= List of Marilyns in the British Isles =

Mountains and hills with prominence no less than 150 m

Marilyn
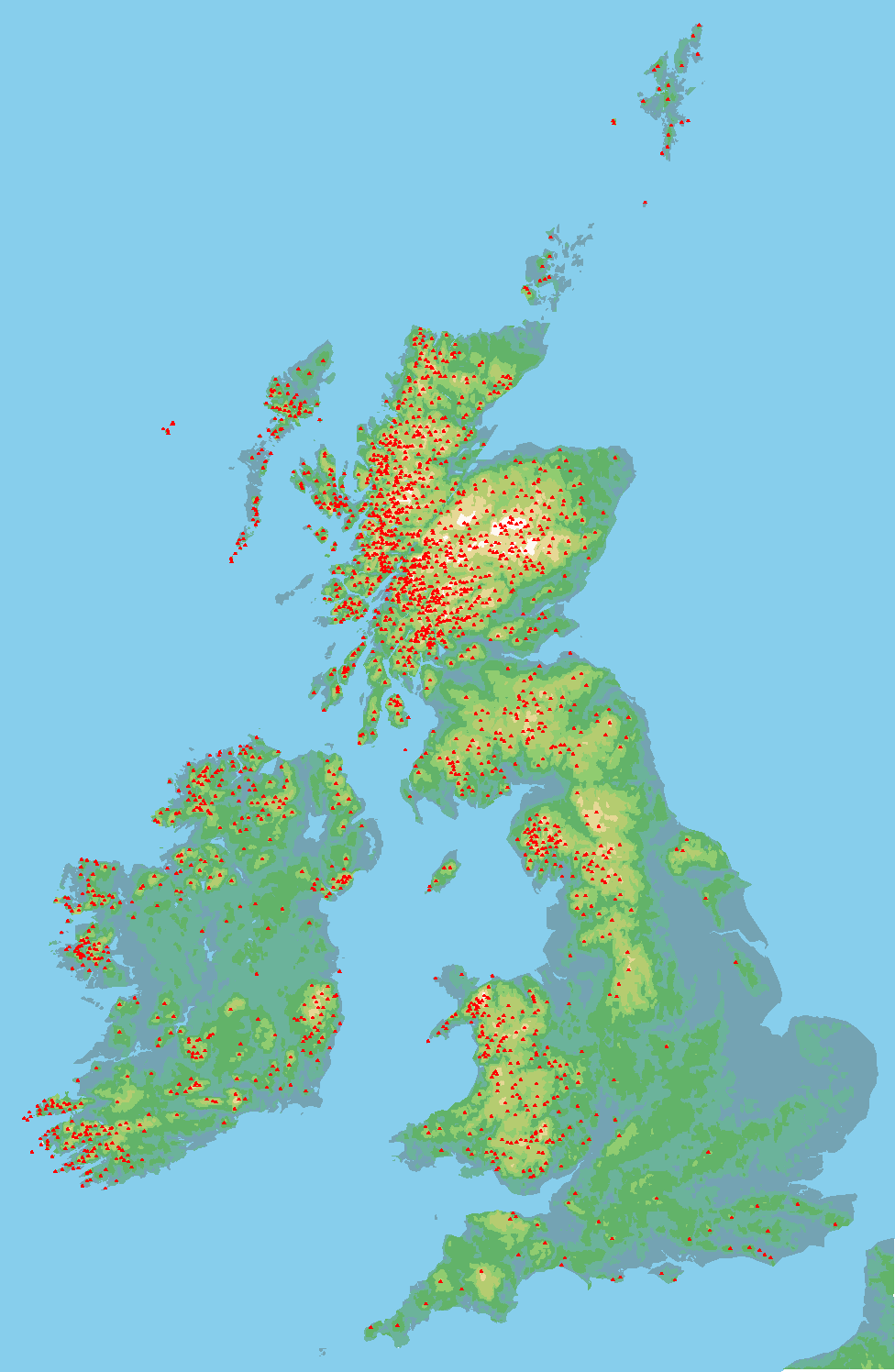
- Marilyns in the British Isles (red dots)

Highest point
- Elevation: no requirement
- Prominence: over 150 m (492 ft)

Geography
- Location: British Isles: 2,010; Scotland: 1,218; Ireland: 454; England: 174; Wales: 159; Isle of Man: 5

A Marilyn is a hill or mountain in the United Kingdom, Ireland or surrounding islands with a prominence of at least 150 metres (492 ft), regardless of its absolute height or other characteristics such as topographic isolation.

Marilyns may include true mountains (with heights above 600 m (2,000 ft)) as well as smaller hills, as long as they meet the prominence criterion.

As of July 2023, there were 2,010 recorded Marilyns.

== Definition ==
The Marilyn classification was created by Alan Dawson in his 1992 book The Relative Hills of Britain. The name was coined as a punning contrast to the Munro classification of Scottish mountains above 3,000 ft (914.4 m), which has no explicit prominence threshold, being homophonous with Monroe. The concept was later extended to Ireland by E. D. "Clem" Clements.

Marilyns were the first of several British Isles classifications based solely on topographic prominence, including the P600s, the HuMPs, and the TuMPs. Determining prominence is more complex than measuring absolute elevation, requiring surveys of each contour line around a peak; therefore lists based on prominence are periodically revised.

Although many of the largest mountains in the islands, such as Ben Nevis, Carrauntoohil, Scafell Pike and Snowdon, are Marilyns, others—including Cairn Gorm and some Munros, as well as hills such as Bowfell, the Langdale Pikes and Carnedd Dafydd—are not, as they lack sufficient relative height compared to nearby higher "parent" peaks.

As of July 2023 there were 2,010 Marilyns in the British Isles: 1,218 in Scotland (including 202 of the 282 Scottish Munros; Munros with Marilyn-prominence are sometimes called Real Munros), 454 in Ireland, 174 in England, 159 in Wales and 5 in the Isle of Man. On 13 October 2014 Rob Woodall and Eddie Dealtry became the first people to climb all 1,557 Marilyns in Great Britain. As of 2022, 11 Marilynists had climbed all Marilyns then listed in Great Britain. As of December 2019, 275 had entered the Marilyn Hall of Fame by climbing over 600 Marilyns.

In June 2025 Dawson published The Revised Relative Hills of Britain: The Marilyns (Pedantic Press, ISBN 978-1-9163662-5-1), listing 1,550 Marilyns in Britain (excluding Ireland and the Isle of Man) and 99 hills that narrowly fail to qualify (submarilyns). As of June 2025 this list is used by the Database of British and Irish Hills to define a Marilyn, with a separate category for The Irish and Manx Marilyns.

=== Examples of Marilyns ===
Marilyns include some of the largest mountains in the British Isles as well as relatively modest hills:

- Large mountains: Ben Nevis (Scotland), Carrauntoohil (Ireland), Scafell Pike (England) and Snowdon (Wales) are Marilyns because they meet the prominence criterion.
- Peaks not qualifying as Marilyns: Cairn Gorm and some Munros, as well as well-known hills such as Bowfell, the Langdale Pikes and Carnedd Dafydd, lack sufficient prominence relative to nearby higher “parent” peaks.
- Modest hills: Crowborough (242 m or 794 ft) in East Sussex and Bishop Wilton Wold (248 m or 814 ft), the highest point of the Yorkshire Wolds, qualify as Marilyns despite their lower absolute heights.
- Sea stacks: Stac Lee (172 m or 564 ft) and Stac an Armin (196 m or 643 ft), in the St Kilda archipelago, are the two tallest sea stacks in the British Isles, 100 miles (160 kilometres) west of the Scottish mainland.

== Coverage ==
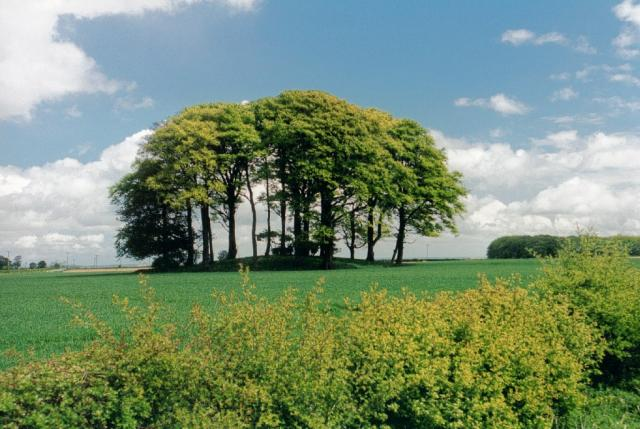
Bishop Wilton Wold (248 m Marilyn)

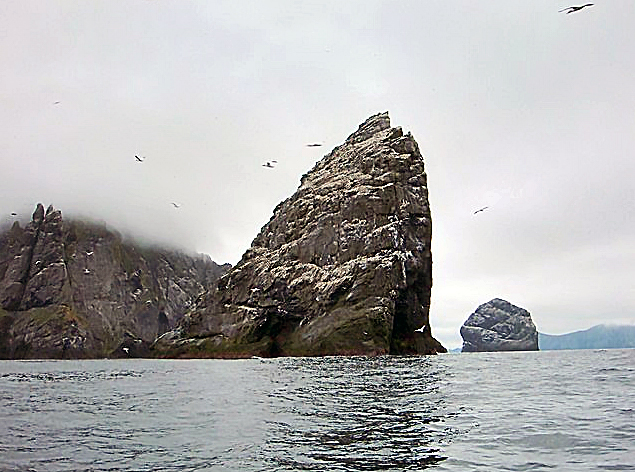
Stac an Armin (196 m Marilyn)

As of April 2020, the list of 2,010 British Isles Marilyns contained:

1. 202 of the 282 Scottish Munros, and none of the 227 Scottish Munro Tops (i.e. no Munro Tops are Marilyns). These 202 hills are sometimes called Real Munros or Marilyn Munros;
2. All 222 Scottish Corbetts, all 219 Scottish Grahams, and 31 of the 118 Scottish New Donalds;
3. 872 of the 2,754 British Isles Simms; (Note: It does not include the two peaks whose prominence rounds up to 150 m)
4. 203 of the 525 England, Wales, and Ireland Hewitts;
5. 43 of the 541 Lake District Birketts (of which 39 are Wainwrights);
6. 163 of the 407 Irish Arderins;
7. All of the 120 P600 ("major") mountains in the British Isles;
8. 14 of the 34 England, Wales, and Ireland Furths.

== By height and prominence ==
This list was downloaded from the Database of British and Irish Hills ("DoBIH") in October 2018, and are peaks the DoBIH marks as Marilyns ("M"). (Note: The Database of British and Irish Hills ("DoBIH") is the most referenced database for the classification of peaks in the British Isles, and the DoBIH is licensed under a "Creative Commons Attribution 3.0 Unported License".) As topological prominence is complex to measure, these tables are subject to revision over time and should not be amended or updated unless the entire DoBIH data is re-downloaded. The tables are structured to show rankings by height and prominence over the entire British Isles, or by region.

=== Updates ===
Since the table was downloaded, the following changes have been made to the list of recognised Marilyns:

- Added: Rhinog Fach, Wales, August 2021 (711.67 m (2,334.9 ft), prominence 151 m (495 ft))
- Removed: Cheriton Hill, Kent (187.7 m (616 ft), prominence 149.7 m (491 ft))
- Removed: Giur-bheinn, Islay (317.4 m (1,041 ft), prominence 148.9 m (489 ft))

=== Table ===
Highest peak per region

Marilyns ranked by height and by prominence (DoBIH, October 2018)

Height Total	Prom. Total	Region	Height Region	Prom. Region	Name	Height (m)	Prom. (m)	Height (ft)	Prom. (ft)	Map Sec.	Topo Map	OS Grid Reference	Classification (§ DoBIH codes)
1	1	Scotland	1	1	Ben Nevis; Highest in Scotland, the UK and the British Isles	1,345	1,345	4,411	4,411	04A	41	NN166712	Ma,M,Sim,CoH,CoU,CoA,SIB
2	9	Scotland	2	7	Ben Macdui	1,309	950	4,295	3,117	08A	36 43	NN988989	Ma,M,Sim,CoH,CoU,CoA
3	250	Scotland	3	177	Braeriach	1,296	461	4,252	1,512	08A	36 43	NN953999	Ma,M,Sim
4	1696	Scotland	4	1039	Cairn Toul	1,291	166	4,236	545	08A	36 43	NN963972	Ma,M,Sim
5	330	Scotland	5	236	Aonach Beag	1,234	404	4,049	1,325	04A	41	NN197715	Ma,M,Sim
6	1755	Scotland	6	1076	Carn Mor Dearg	1,220	162	4,003	531	04A	41	NN177721	Ma,M,Sim
7	11	Scotland	7	8	Ben Lawers	1,214	915	3,983	3,002	02B	51	NN635414	Ma,M,Sim,CoH,CoU,CoA
8	257	Scotland	8	182	Beinn a' Bhuird	1,197	456	3,927	1,496	08B	36	NJ092006	Ma,M,Sim
9	806	Scotland	9	531	Beinn Mheadhoin	1,183	254	3,881	833	08A	36	NJ024016	Ma,M,Sim
10	2	Scotland	10	2	Carn Eige	1,183	1,147	3,881	3,763	11A	25	NH123261	Ma,M,Sim,CoH
11	270	Scotland	11	193	Stob Choire Claurigh	1,177	446	3,862	1,463	04A	41	NN261738	Ma,M,Sim
12	6	Scotland	12	4	Ben More (Crianlarich)	1,174	986	3,852	3,235	01C	51	NN432244	Ma,M,Sim,CoU,CoA
13	1276	Scotland	13	804	Ben Avon	1,171	197	3,842	646	08B	36	NJ131018	Ma,M,Sim
14	591	Scotland	14	403	Stob Binnein	1,165	303	3,822	994	01C	51	NN434227	Ma,M,Sim
15	781	Scotland	15	510	Beinn Bhrotain	1,157	258	3,796	846	08A	43	NN954922	Ma,M,Sim
16	73	Scotland	16	54	Lochnagar	1,156	671	3,793	2,201	07A	44	NO243861	Ma,M,Sim
17	286	Scotland	17	206	Sgurr nan Ceathreamhnan	1,151	434	3,776	1,424	11A	25 33	NH057228	Ma,M,Sim
18	24	Scotland	18	19	Sgurr na Lapaich	1,151	840	3,776	2,756	12B	25	NH161351	Ma,M,Sim
19	22	Scotland	19	17	Bidean nam Bian	1,149	844	3,771	2,769	03B	41	NN143542	Ma,M,Sim,CoH
20	40	Scotland	20	33	Ben Alder	1,148	783	3,766	2,569	04B	42	NN496718	Ma,M,Sim
21	320	Scotland	21	229	Geal-Chàrn	1,132	410	3,714	1,345	04B	42	NN469746	Ma,M,Sim
22	15	Scotland	22	11	Ben Lui	1,130	875	3,707	2,871	01D	50	NN266262	Ma,M,Sim
23	46	Scotland	23	37	Binnein Mor	1,130	759	3,707	2,490	04A	41	NN212663	Ma,M,Sim
24	596	Scotland	24	408	An Riabhachan	1,129	302	3,704	991	12B	25	NH133344	Ma,M,Sim
25	18	Scotland	25	14	Creag Meagaidh	1,128	867	3,701	2,844	09C	34 42	NN418875	Ma,M,Sim
26	14	Scotland	26	10	Ben Cruachan	1,127	880	3,698	2,887	03C	50	NN069304	Ma,M,Sim,CoU,CoA
27	1266	Scotland	27	801	Meall Garbh	1,123	198	3,685	650	02B	51	NN644437	Ma,M,Sim
28	79	Scotland	28	59	Beinn a' Ghlo	1,122	658	3,681	2,159	06B	43	NN971733	Ma,M,Sim
29	38	Scotland	29	31	A' Chraileag	1,120	786	3,675	2,579	11B	33	NH094147	Ma,M,Sim
30	883	Scotland	30	579	Sgor Gaoith	1,118	242	3,668	794	08A	36 43	NN903989	Ma,M,Sim
31	110	Scotland	31	79	Stob Coire Easain	1,115	611	3,658	2,005	04A	41	NN308730	Ma,M,Sim
32	385	Scotland	32	270	Sgurr nan Conbhairean	1,109	382	3,638	1,253	11B	34	NH129138	Ma,M,Sim
33	12	Scotland	33	9	Sgurr Mor	1,108	913	3,635	2,995	14B	20	NH203718	Ma,M,Sim
34	36	Scotland	34	29	Meall a' Bhuiridh	1,108	795	3,635	2,608	03C	41	NN250503	Ma,M,Sim
35	1923	Scotland	35	1179	Mullach Fraoch-choire	1,102	153	3,615	502	11B	33	NH094171	Ma,M,Sim
36	1647	Scotland	36	1010	Creise	1,100	169	3,608	556	03C	41	NN238506	Ma,M,Sim
37	528	Scotland	37	362	Sgurr a' Mhaim	1,099	316	3,606	1,037	04A	41	NN164667	Ma,M,Sim
38	1800	Scotland	38	1101	Sgurr Choinnich Mor	1,094	159	3,589	522	04A	41	NN227714	Ma,M,Sim
39	977	Scotland	39	632	Sgurr nan Clach Geala	1,093	229	3,586	751	14B	20	NH184714	Ma,M,Sim
40	351	Scotland	40	248	Stob Ghabhar	1,090	393	3,576	1,289	03C	50	NN230455	Ma,M,Sim
41	660	Scotland	41	439	Bynack More	1,090	283	3,576	928	08A	36	NJ041063	Ma,M,Sim
42	163	Scotland	42	113	Beinn a' Chlachair	1,087	539	3,566	1,768	04B	42	NN471781	Ma,M,Sim
43	3	Wales	1	1	Snowdon; Highest in Wales	1,085	1,039	3,560	3,409	30B	115	SH609543	Ma,F,Sim,Hew,N,CoH,CoU,CoA
44	34	Scotland	43	27	Beinn Dearg	1,084	805	3,556	2,641	15A	20	NH259811	Ma,M,Sim
45	53	Scotland	44	42	Schiehallion	1,083	716	3,553	2,349	02A	42 51 52	NN713547	Ma,M,Sim
46	855	Scotland	45	562	Beinn a' Chaorainn	1,083	246	3,553	807	08B	36	NJ045013	Ma,M,Sim
47	32	Scotland	46	25	Sgurr a' Choire Ghlais	1,083	818	3,553	2,684	12A	25	NH258430	Ma,M,Sim
48	85	Scotland	47	64	Beinn a' Chreachain	1,081	650	3,545	2,133	02A	50	NN373440	Ma,M,Sim
49	271	Scotland	48	194	Ben Starav	1,078	446	3,537	1,463	03C	50	NN125427	Ma,M,Sim
50	135	Scotland	49	91	Beinn Sheasgarnaich	1,077	579	3,535	1,900	02B	51	NN413383	Ma,M,Sim
51	484	Scotland	50	330	Beinn Dorain	1,076	332	3,530	1,089	02A	50	NN325378	Ma,M,Sim
52	1035	Scotland	51	667	Beinn a' Ghlo - Braigh Coire Chruinn-bhalgain	1,070	222	3,510	730	06B	43	NN945724	Ma,M,Sim
53	1233	Scotland	52	778	Meall Corranaich	1,069	202	3,507	663	02B	51	NN615410	Ma,M,Sim
54	1180	Scotland	53	749	An Socach	1,069	207	3,507	679	12B	25	NH100332	Ma,M,Sim
55	76	Scotland	54	56	Sgurr Fhuaran	1,069	665	3,506	2,182	11A	33	NG978166	Ma,M,Sim
56	1304	Scotland	55	823	Glas Maol	1,068	194	3,504	636	07A	43	NO166765	Ma,M,Sim,CoH,CoU
57	49	Wales	2	2	Carnedd Llewelyn	1,064	750	3,491	2,461	30B	115	SH683643	Ma,F,Sim,Hew,N,CoU
58	47	Scotland	56	38	An Teallach - Bidein a' Ghlas Thuill	1,063	757	3,486	2,484	14A	19	NH068843	Ma,M,Sim
59	8	Scotland	57	6	Liathach - Spidean a' Choire Leith	1,055	957	3,461	3,140	13A	25	NG929579	Ma,M,Sim
60	1444	Scotland	58	904	Toll Creagach	1,054	182	3,458	597	11A	25	NH194282	Ma,M,Sim
61	138	Scotland	59	94	Sgùrr a' Chaorachain	1,053	568	3,455	1,864	12A	25	NH087447	Ma,M,Sim
62	967	Scotland	60	625	Beinn a' Chaorainn	1,052	230	3,451	755	09C	34 41	NN386850	Ma,M,Sim
63	377	Scotland	61	264	Glas Tulaichean	1,051	384	3,448	1,260	06B	43	NO051760	Ma,M,Sim
64	555	Scotland	62	382	Geal Charn	1,049	310	3,442	1,017	04B	42	NN504811	Ma,M,Sim
65	352	Scotland	63	249	Creag Mhor	1,047	393	3,435	1,289	02B	50	NN391361	Ma,M,Sim
66	89	Scotland	64	67	Chno Dearg	1,046	644	3,432	2,113	04B	41	NN377741	Ma,M,Sim
67	64	Scotland	65	50	Ben Wyvis - Glas Leathad Mor	1,046	691	3,432	2,267	15B	20	NH462683	Ma,M,Sim
68	156	Scotland	66	108	Cruach Ardrain	1,046	549	3,431	1,801	01C	51 56	NN409212	Ma,M,Sim
69	848	Scotland	67	556	Beinn Iutharn Mhòr	1,045	247	3,428	810	06B	43	NO045792	Ma,M,Sim
70	572	Scotland	68	393	Stob Coir' an Albannaich	1,044	306	3,425	1,004	03C	50	NN169443	Ma,M,Sim
71	204	Scotland	69	143	Meall nan Tarmachan	1,044	494	3,424	1,622	02B	51	NN585389	Ma,M,Sim
72	241	Scotland	70	172	Carn Mairg	1,042	466	3,419	1,529	02A	42 51	NN684512	Ma,M,Sim
73	25	Scotland	71	20	Sgurr na Ciche	1,040	839	3,412	2,753	10B	33 40	NM902966	Ma,M,Sim
74	208	Scotland	72	146	Meall Ghaordaidh	1,040	492	3,411	1,614	02B	51	NN514397	Ma,M,Sim
75	4	Ireland	1	1	Carrauntoohil; Highest in the Republic of Ireland and the island of Ireland	1,039	1,039	3,407	3,407	50C	78	V803844	Ma,F,Sim,Hew,Dil,A,VL,CoH,CoU
76	1004	Scotland	73	650	Beinn Achaladair	1,039	226	3,407	741	02A	50	NN344432	Ma,M,Sim
77	961	Scotland	74	620	Carn a' Mhaim	1,037	231	3,402	758	08A	36 43	NN994951	Ma,M,Sim
78	552	Scotland	75	379	Sgurr a' Bhealaich Dheirg	1,036	311	3,399	1,020	11A	33	NH035143	Ma,M,Sim
79	45	Scotland	76	36	Gleouraich	1,035	765	3,396	2,510	10A	33	NH039053	Ma,M,Sim
80	1829	Scotland	77	1120	Carn Dearg	1,034	158	3,392	518	04B	42	NN504764	Ma,M,Sim
81	88	Scotland	78	66	Beinn Fhada	1,032	647	3,386	2,123	11A	33	NH018192	Ma,M,Sim
82	1939	Scotland	79	1188	Am Bodach	1,032	153	3,385	501	04A	41	NN176650	Ma,M,Sim
83	463	Scotland	80	318	Ben Oss	1,029	342	3,376	1,122	01D	50	NN287253	Ma,M,Sim
84	1390	Scotland	81	869	Carn Gorm	1,029	187	3,376	614	02A	42 51	NN635500	Ma,M,Sim
85	782	Scotland	82	511	Carn an Righ	1,029	258	3,376	846	06B	43	NO028772	Ma,M,Sim
86	58	Scotland	83	45	Sgurr a' Mhaoraich	1,027	708	3,369	2,323	10A	33	NG983065	Ma,M,Sim
87	1500	Scotland	84	935	Sgurr na Ciste Duibhe	1,027	178	3,369	584	11A	33	NG984149	Ma,M,Sim
88	266	Scotland	85	190	Ben Challum	1,025	450	3,363	1,476	02B	50	NN386322	Ma,M,Sim
89	50	Scotland	86	40	Beinn a' Bheithir - Sgorr Dhearg	1,024	729	3,360	2,392	03B	41	NN056558	Ma,M,Sim
90	1944	Scotland	87	1191	Liathach - Mullach an Rathain	1,024	152	3,359	499	13A	25	NG911576	Ma,M,Sim
91	166	Scotland	88	114	Buachaille Etive Mor - Stob Dearg	1,021	532	3,351	1,745	03B	41	NN222542	Ma,M,Sim
92	37	Scotland	89	30	Ladhar Bheinn	1,020	795	3,346	2,608	10B	33	NG824039	Ma,M,Sim
93	206	Scotland	90	144	Aonach air Chrith	1,020	493	3,345	1,617	10A	33	NH051083	Ma,M,Sim
94	1402	Scotland	91	880	Beinn Bheoil	1,019	186	3,343	610	04B	42	NN517717	Ma,M,Sim
95	125	Scotland	92	86	Mullach Coire Mhic Fhearchair	1,015	591	3,331	1,939	14A	19	NH052735	Ma,M,Sim
96	1665	Scotland	93	1025	Garbh Chioch Mhòr	1,013	168	3,323	551	10B	33 40	NM909961	Ma,M,Sim
97	478	Scotland	94	325	The Saddle	1,011	334	3,318	1,096	10A	33	NG936131	Ma,M,Sim
98	55	Scotland	95	44	Beinn Ime	1,011	712	3,317	2,336	01D	56	NN254084	Ma,M,Sim
99	148	Scotland	96	100	Beinn Udlamain	1,010	555	3,314	1,821	05A	42	NN579739	Ma,M,Sim
100	711	Scotland	97	475	Sgurr Eilde Mor	1,010	271	3,314	889	04A	41	NN230657	Ma,M,Sim
101	1363	Scotland	98	852	Sgurr an Doire Leathain	1,010	189	3,314	620	10A	33	NH015098	Ma,M,Sim
102	95	Scotland	99	69	Beinn Eighe - Ruadh-stac Mor	1,010	632	3,314	2,073	13A	19	NG951611	Ma,M,Sim
103	231	Scotland	100	163	Beinn Dearg	1,009	473	3,309	1,552	06A	43	NN852778	Ma,M,Sim
104	518	Scotland	101	354	An Sgarsoch	1,007	319	3,302	1,047	06A	43	NN933836	Ma,M,Sim
105	331	Scotland	102	237	Creag Toll a' Choin	1,005	403	3,298	1,322	12A	25	NH130453	Ma,Sim,xMT
106	1582	Scotland	103	977	Beinn Fhionnlaidh	1,005	173	3,296	568	11A	25	NH115282	Ma,M,Sim
107	849	Scotland	104	557	Beinn an Dothaidh	1,004	247	3,294	810	02A	50	NN331408	Ma,M,Sim
108	465	Scotland	105	319	Sgurr Mor	1,003	341	3,291	1,119	10B	33 40	NM965980	Ma,M,Sim
109	1684	Scotland	106	1032	Meall Greigh	1,001	167	3,284	548	02B	51	NN674438	Ma,M,Sim
110	869	Scotland	107	570	Beinn a' Bheithir - Sgorr Dhonuill	1,001	244	3,284	801	03B	41	NN040555	Ma,M,Sim
111	1568	Scotland	108	970	Aonach Meadhoin	1,001	174	3,284	571	11A	33	NH048137	Ma,M,Sim
112	91	Wales	3	5	Glyder Fawr	1,001	642	3,284	2,106	30B	115	SH642579	Ma,F,Sim,Hew,N
113	913	Scotland	109	594	Stob Ban	1,000	237	3,280	778	04A	41	NN147654	Ma,M,Sim
114	263	Scotland	110	187	Sgurr Breac	999	451	3,278	1,480	14B	20	NH158711	Ma,M,Sim
115	26	Scotland	111	21	Ben More Assynt	998	835	3,274	2,740	16E	15	NC318201	Ma,M,Sim,CoH
116	962	Scotland	112	621	Glas Bheinn Mhor	997	231	3,271	758	03C	50	NN153429	Ma,M,Sim
117	1445	Scotland	113	905	A' Chailleach	997	182	3,271	597	14B	19	NH136714	Ma,M,Sim
118	785	Scotland	114	514	Spidean Mialach	996	257	3,268	843	10A	33	NH065043	Ma,M,Sim
119	232	Scotland	115	164	An Caisteal	996	473	3,267	1,552	01C	50 56	NN378193	Ma,M,Sim
120	653	Scotland	116	436	Carn an Fhidhleir	994	286	3,261	937	06A	43	NN904841	Ma,M,Sim
121	314	Scotland	117	226	Sgurr na h-Ulaidh	994	415	3,261	1,362	03B	41	NN111517	Ma,M,Sim
122	1005	Scotland	118	651	Sgurr na Ruaidhe	993	226	3,258	741	12A	25	NH289426	Ma,M,Sim
123	1277	Scotland	119	805	Carn nan Gobhar	993	197	3,258	646	12B	25	NH181343	Ma,M,Sim
124	1597	Scotland	120	988	Beinn Eighe - Spidean Coire nan Clach	993	172	3,258	564	13A	25	NG966597	Ma,M,Sim
125	5	Scotland	121	3	Sgurr Alasdair	992	992	3,255	3,255	17B	32	NG450207	Ma,M,Sim,SIB
126	1446	Scotland	122	906	Sgairneach Mhor	991	182	3,251	597	05A	42	NN598731	Ma,M,Sim
127	300	Scotland	123	217	Beinn Eunaich	989	425	3,245	1,394	03C	50	NN135327	Ma,M,Sim
128	1713	Scotland	124	1051	Sgurr Ban	989	165	3,245	541	14A	19	NH055745	Ma,M,Sim
129	807	Ireland	2	178	Cnoc na Peiste	988	254	3,241	833	50C	78	V835841	Ma,F,Sim,Hew,Dil,A,VL
130	23	Scotland	125	18	Gulvain	987	842	3,238	2,762	10D	41	NN002875	Ma,M,Sim
131	276	Scotland	126	199	Lurg Mhor	987	442	3,238	1,450	12A	25	NH064404	Ma,M,Sim
132	118	Scotland	127	82	Beinn Alligin	986	601	3,235	1,972	13A	19 24	NG865612	Ma,M,Sim
133	1391	Scotland	128	870	Sgurr Dearg	986	187	3,235	614	17B	32	NG444215	Ma,M,Sim
134	27	Scotland	129	22	Ben Vorlich	985	834	3,232	2,736	01B	57	NN629189	Ma,M,Sim
135	1969	Scotland	130	1202	An Gearanach	981	151	3,220	497	04A	41	NN187669	Ma,M,Sim
136	99	Scotland	131	71	Slioch	981	626	3,219	2,054	14A	19	NH004690	Ma,M,Sim
137	815	Scotland	132	535	Beinn a' Chochuill	980	252	3,215	827	03C	50	NN109328	Ma,M,Sim
138	367	Scotland	133	259	Ciste Dhubh	979	388	3,212	1,273	11A	33	NH062166	Ma,M,Sim
139	13	England	1	1	Scafell Pike; Highest in England	978	912	3,209	2,992	34B	89 90	NY215072	Ma,F,Sim,Hew,N,W,B,Sy,Fel,CoH,CoU,CoA
140	1261	Scotland	134	798	Beinn Dubhchraig	978	199	3,209	653	01D	50	NN307254	Ma,M,Sim
141	1714	Scotland	135	1052	Cona' Mheall	978	165	3,209	541	15A	20	NH275816	Ma,M,Sim
142	1569	Scotland	136	971	Stob Ban	977	174	3,205	571	04A	41	NN266723	Ma,M,Sim
143	1137	Scotland	137	724	Beinn a' Ghlo - Carn Liath	976	211	3,202	692	06B	43	NN936698	Ma,M,Sim
144	816	Scotland	138	536	Stuc a' Chroin	975	252	3,199	827	01B	57	NN617174	Ma,M,Sim
145	610	Scotland	139	413	Carn a' Gheoidh	975	298	3,199	978	06B	43	NO107767	Ma,M,Sim
146	30	Scotland	140	23	Ben Lomond	974	820	3,196	2,690	01C	56	NN367028	Ma,M,Sim,CoH
147	196	Scotland	141	136	Beinn Sgritheall	974	500	3,196	1,640	10A	33	NG835126	Ma,M,Sim
148	100	Scotland	142	72	Aonach Eagach - Sgorr nam Fiannaidh	968	623	3,175	2,044	03A	41	NN140583	Ma,M,Sim
149	277	Scotland	143	200	A' Mhaighdean	967	442	3,173	1,450	14A	19	NH007749	Ma,M,Sim
150	7	Scotland	144	5	Ben More	966	966	3,169	3,169	17E	47 48	NM525330	Ma,M,Sim,SIB
151	1223	Scotland	145	772	Sgurr nan Gillean	964	203	3,163	666	17B	32	NG471253	Ma,M,Sim
152	524	Scotland	146	358	Carn a' Chlamain	964	317	3,161	1,040	06A	43	NN915758	Ma,M,Sim
153	105	Scotland	147	75	Sgurr Thuilm	963	614	3,159	2,014	10D	40	NM939879	Ma,M,Sim
154	31	Scotland	148	24	Ben Klibreck - Meall nan Con	962	819	3,156	2,687	16D	16	NC585299	Ma,M,Sim
155	52	Scotland	149	41	Sgorr Ruadh	961	723	3,152	2,372	13B	25	NG959505	Ma,M,Sim
156	218	Scotland	150	154	Stuchd an Lochain	960	482	3,150	1,581	02A	51	NN483448	Ma,M,Sim
157	461	Scotland	151	317	Beinn nan Aighenan	960	343	3,150	1,125	03C	50	NN148405	Ma,M,Sim
158	150	Scotland	152	102	Meall Glas	959	554	3,146	1,818	02B	51	NN431321	Ma,M,Sim
159	190	Scotland	153	132	Beinn Fhionnlaidh	959	510	3,146	1,673	03B	50	NN095497	Ma,M,Sim
160	235	Scotland	154	166	Buachaille Etive Beag - Stob Dubh	958	469	3,143	1,539	03B	41	NN179535	Ma,M,Sim
161	938	Scotland	155	607	Sgúrr nan Coireachan	956	234	3,136	768	10D	40	NM902880	Ma,M,Sim
162	600	Scotland	156	410	Sgor Gaibhre	955	300	3,133	984	04B	42	NN444674	Ma,M,Sim
163	534	Scotland	157	366	Beinn Mhanach	953	315	3,127	1,033	02A	50	NN373411	Ma,M,Sim
164	1051	Scotland	158	675	Sgúrr nan Coireachan	953	220	3,127	722	10B	33 40	NM933958	Ma,M,Sim
165	412	Scotland	159	286	Am Faochagach	953	367	3,127	1,204	15A	20	NH303793	Ma,M,Sim
166	10	Ireland	3	2	Mount Brandon	952	927	3,122	3,041	49A	70	Q460116	Ma,F,Sim,Hew,Dil,A,VL
167	242	Scotland	160	173	Meall Chuaich	951	466	3,120	1,529	05B	42	NN716878	Ma,M,Sim
168	56	England	2	2	Helvellyn	950	712	3,117	2,336	34C	90	NY342151	Ma,F,Sim,Hew,N,W,B,Sy,Fel,CoH
169	124	Scotland	161	85	Beinn Bhuidhe	949	592	3,112	1,942	01D	50 56	NN203187	Ma,M,Sim
170	921	Wales	4	56	Y Garn	947	236	3,107	774	30B	115	SH630595	Ma,F,Sim,Hew,N
171	850	Scotland	162	558	Sgurr na Sgine	946	247	3,104	810	10A	33	NG946113	Ma,M,Sim
172	199	Scotland	163	138	Meall Buidhe	946	496	3,104	1,627	10B	33 40	NM848989	Ma,M,Sim
173	126	Scotland	164	87	Carn Dearg	946	591	3,103	1,939	09B	35	NH635023	Ma,M,Sim
174	1401	Scotland	165	879	Càrn Bhac	945	187	3,101	613	06B	43	NO051832	Ma,M,Sim
175	686	Scotland	166	456	Stob a' Choire Odhair	945	277	3,100	909	03C	50	NN257459	Ma,M,Sim
176	1160	Scotland	167	741	Bidein a' Choire Sheasgaich	945	209	3,100	686	12A	25	NH049412	Ma,M,Sim
177	1380	Scotland	168	864	An Socach	944	188	3,097	617	06B	43	NO079800	Ma,M,Sim
178	96	Scotland	169	70	Ben Vorlich	943	632	3,094	2,073	01D	50 56	NN295124	Ma,M,Sim,CoH
179	1278	Scotland	170	806	Binnein Beag	943	197	3,094	646	04A	41	NN221677	Ma,M,Sim
180	1066	Scotland	171	685	Carn Dearg	941	218	3,087	715	04B	42	NN417661	Ma,M,Sim
181	500	Scotland	172	342	Càrn na Caim	941	327	3,087	1,073	05B	42	NN677821	Ma,M,Sim
182	547	Scotland	173	375	Mount Keen	939	312	3,081	1,024	07B	44	NO409869	Ma,M,Sim
183	796	Scotland	174	523	Luinne Bheinn	939	255	3,081	837	10B	33	NG869007	Ma,M,Sim
184	77	Scotland	175	57	Beinn Sgulaird	937	662	3,074	2,172	03B	50	NN053460	Ma,M,Sim
185	101	Scotland	176	73	Sron a' Choire Ghairbh	937	622	3,074	2,041	10C	34	NN222945	Ma,M,Sim
186	1185	Scotland	177	752	Beinn Tarsuinn	937	206	3,074	676	14A	19	NH039727	Ma,M,Sim
187	326	Scotland	178	232	Beinn na Lap	935	406	3,068	1,332	04B	41	NN376695	Ma,M,Sim
188	184	Scotland	179	128	Maol Chean-dearg	933	514	3,061	1,686	13B	25	NG924499	Ma,M,Sim
189	80	Scotland	180	60	Fionn Bheinn	933	658	3,061	2,159	14B	20	NH147621	Ma,M,Sim
190	542	Scotland	181	371	Beinn Chabhair	932	313	3,058	1,027	01C	50 56	NN367179	Ma,M,Sim
191	529	Scotland	182	363	Meall Buidhe	932	316	3,058	1,037	02A	51	NN498499	Ma,M,Sim
192	57	England	3	3	Skiddaw	931	709	3,054	2,326	34A	89 90	NY260290	Ma,F,Sim,Hew,N,W,B,Sy,Fel
193	86	Scotland	183	65	Ben Chonzie	931	648	3,054	2,126	01A	51 52	NN773308	Ma,M,Sim
194	19	Scotland	184	15	Bla Bheinn	929	862	3,048	2,828	17B	32	NG529217	Ma,M,Sim
195	1570	Scotland	185	972	Meall nan Eun	928	174	3,045	571	03C	50	NN192449	Ma,M,Sim
196	122	Scotland	186	84	Moruisg	928	594	3,045	1,949	12A	25	NH101499	Ma,M,Sim
197	635	Scotland	187	426	Beinn Narnain	927	290	3,041	951	01D	56	NN271066	Ma,M,Sim
198	1697	Scotland	188	1040	Eididh nan Clach Geala	927	166	3,041	545	15A	20	NH257842	Ma,M,Sim
199	43	Scotland	189	35	Ben Hope	927	772	3,041	2,533	16B	9	NC477501	Ma,M,Sim
200	712	Scotland	190	476	Beinn Liath Mhor	926	271	3,038	889	13B	25	NG964519	Ma,M,Sim
201	823	Scotland	191	541	Seana Bhraigh	926	251	3,038	823	15A	20	NH281878	Ma,M,Sim
202	1989	Scotland	192	1213	Meall a' Choire Leith	926	151	3,037	494	02B	51	NN612438	Ma,M,Sim
203	21	Ireland	4	3	Lugnaquilla	925	849	3,035	2,785	55A	56	T032917	Ma,F,Sim,Hew,Dil,A,VL,CoH,CoU
204	1525	Scotland	193	948	Buachaille Etive Beag - Stob Coire Raineach	925	177	3,035	581	03B	41	NN191548	Ma,M,Sim
205	1120	Wales	5	74	Elidir Fawr	924	212	3,031	696	30B	115	SH611612	Ma,F,Sim,Hew,N
206	1881	Scotland	194	1150	Beinn Alligin - Tom na Gruagaich	922	155	3,025	509	13A	19 24	NG859601	Ma,M,Sim
207	553	Scotland	195	380	Sgiath Chuil	920	311	3,018	1,020	02B	51	NN462317	Ma,M,Sim
208	151	Scotland	196	103	Gairich	919	552	3,015	1,811	10B	33	NN025995	Ma,M,Sim
209	1685	Scotland	197	1033	Ruadh Stac Mor	919	167	3,014	548	14A	19	NH018756	Ma,M,Sim,xC
210	1364	Scotland	198	853	Creag nan Damh	918	189	3,012	620	10A	33	NG983112	Ma,M,Sim
211	325	Scotland	199	231	A' Ghlas-bheinn	918	407	3,012	1,335	11A	25 33	NH008231	Ma,M,Sim
212	29	Ireland	5	5	Galtymore	918	821	3,011	2,694	53A	74	R878237	Ma,F,Sim,Hew,Dil,A,VL,CoH,CoU
213	1343	Wales	6	94	Tryfan	918	191	3,010	627	30B	115	SH664593	Ma,F,Sim,Hew,N
214	1501	Scotland	200	936	Geal-charn	917	178	3,009	584	05A	42	NN596782	Ma,M,Sim
215	579	Scotland	201	397	Meall na Teanga	917	306	3,008	1,002	10C	34	NN220924	Ma,M,Sim
216	304	Scotland	202	218	Ben Vane	916	424	3,004	1,391	01D	56	NN277098	Ma,M,Sim
217	598	Scotland	203	409	Beinn Teallach	915	301	3,001	988	09C	34 41	NN361859	Ma,M,Sim,xC
218	725	Scotland	204	484	Beinn a' Chlaidheimh	914	268	2,999	879	14A	19	NH061775	Ma,C,Sim,xMT
219	236	Scotland	205	167	Beinn Dearg	914	469	2,998	1,539	13A	19 24	NG895608	Ma,C,Sim
220	1410	Scotland	206	886	Sgurr nan Ceannaichean	913	185	2,997	607	12A	25	NH087480	Ma,C,Sim,xMT
221	362	Scotland	207	255	Sgurr a' Choire-bheithe	913	390	2,996	1,280	10B	33	NG895015	Ma,C,Sim
222	1614	Scotland	208	995	Beinn Bhreac	912	171	2,994	561	06A	43	NN868820	Ma,C,Sim
223	1882	Scotland	209	1151	Leathad an Taobhain	912	155	2,991	509	06A	43	NN821858	Ma,C,Sim
224	228	Scotland	210	161	The Fara	911	475	2,990	1,558	04B	42	NN598842	Ma,C,Sim
225	66	Scotland	211	52	Foinaven	911	688	2,989	2,257	16B	9	NC315506	Ma,C,Sim
226	706	Scotland	212	471	Beinn nan Oighreag	910	272	2,984	892	02B	51	NN541412	Ma,C,Sim
227	281	Scotland	213	204	Streap	909	438	2,982	1,437	10D	40	NM946863	Ma,C,Sim
228	776	Scotland	214	507	Meall Buidhe	908	259	2,980	850	02A	51	NN426449	Ma,C,Sim
229	1267	Scotland	215	802	Beinn Maol Chaluim	907	198	2,976	650	03B	41	NN134525	Ma,C,Sim
230	884	Scotland	216	580	Fuar Tholl	907	242	2,976	794	13B	25	NG975489	Ma,C,Sim
231	200	Scotland	217	139	Leum Uilleim	906	496	2,974	1,627	04A	41	NN330641	Ma,C,Sim
232	141	Scotland	218	96	Beinn Dearg Mor	906	564	2,973	1,850	14A	19	NH032799	Ma,C,Sim
233	75	Wales	7	4	Aran Fawddwy	905	670	2,969	2,198	30E	124 125	SH862223	Ma,Sim,Hew,N,CoH
234	431	Scotland	219	297	Ben Tee	904	356	2,966	1,168	10C	34	NN240972	Ma,C,Sim
235	454	Scotland	220	314	Ben Vuirich	903	345	2,963	1,132	06B	43	NN997700	Ma,C,Sim
236	181	Scotland	221	125	Beinn Damh	903	518	2,963	1,699	13B	24	NG892502	Ma,C,Sim
237	93	Scotland	222	68	Beinn an Lochain	902	640	2,958	2,100	19C	56	NN218078	Ma,C,Sim,xMT
238	256	Scotland	223	181	Beinn Odhar	901	457	2,956	1,499	02B	50	NN337338	Ma,C,Sim
239	1435	Scotland	224	897	Sgurr an Fhuarain	901	183	2,956	600	10B	33 40	NM987979	Ma,C,Sim
240	1730	Scotland	225	1062	Beinn Mheadhonach	901	165	2,955	540	06A	43	NN880759	Ma,C,Sim
241	548	Scotland	226	376	Culardoch	900	312	2,953	1,024	08B	36 43	NO193988	Ma,C,Sim
242	301	England	4	11	Great Gable	899	425	2,949	1,394	34B	89 90	NY211103	Ma,Sim,Hew,N,W,B,Sy,Fel
243	229	Scotland	227	162	Aonach Buidhe	899	474	2,949	1,555	12B	25	NH057324	Ma,C,Sim
244	108	Scotland	228	78	Sgurr nan Eugallt	898	612	2,946	2,008	10B	33	NG927048	Ma,C,Sim
245	1906	Wales	8	148	Y Lliwedd	898	154	2,946	505	30B	115	SH622533	Ma,Sim,Hew,N
246	1648	Scotland	229	1011	Beinn a' Bhuiridh	897	169	2,943	554	03C	50	NN094283	Ma,C,Sim
247	870	Scotland	230	571	Ben Tirran	896	244	2,940	801	07B	44	NO373746	Ma,C,Sim
248	1138	Scotland	231	725	Gairbeinn	896	211	2,940	692	09B	34	NN460985	Ma,C,Sim
249	1457	Scotland	232	910	Ruadh-stac Beag	896	181	2,940	594	13A	19	NG972613	Ma,C,Sim
250	20	Scotland	233	16	Beinn Bhan	896	851	2,940	2,792	13B	24	NG803450	Ma,C,Sim
251	1686	Scotland	234	1034	Creag Mhor	895	167	2,936	548	08B	36	NJ057047	Ma,C,Sim
252	83	England	5	4	Cross Fell	893	651	2,930	2,136	35A	91	NY687343	Ma,Sim,Hew,N
253	113	Wales	9	7	Cadair Idris	893	608	2,929	1,995	30F	124	SH711130	Ma,Sim,Hew,N
254	448	England	6	25	Pillar	892	348	2,927	1,142	34B	89 90	NY171121	Ma,Sim,Hew,N,W,B,Sy,Fel
255	169	Scotland	235	117	Beinn a' Chuallaich	892	527	2,927	1,729	05A	42	NN684617	Ma,C,Sim
256	496	Scotland	236	338	An Ruadh-stac	892	329	2,927	1,079	13B	25	NG921480	Ma,C,Sim
257	939	Scotland	237	608	Beinn Enaiglair	890	234	2,920	768	15A	20	NH225805	Ma,C,Sim
258	258	Scotland	238	183	Creagan na Beinne	888	455	2,913	1,493	01A	51 52	NN744368	Ma,C,Sim
259	914	Scotland	239	595	Aonach Shasuinn	888	237	2,913	778	11B	34	NH173180	Ma,C,Sim
260	17	Scotland	240	13	Sgurr Dhomhnuill	888	873	2,913	2,864	18B	40	NM889678	Ma,C,Sim
261	824	Scotland	241	542	Ben Aden	887	251	2,910	823	10B	33 40	NM899986	Ma,C,Sim
262	311	Scotland	242	223	Meall a' Ghiubhais	887	418	2,910	1,371	13A	19	NG976634	Ma,C,Sim
263	239	Scotland	243	170	Beinn a' Chaisteil	886	467	2,907	1,532	02B	50	NN347364	Ma,C,Sim
264	72	Wales	10	3	Pen y Fan	886	672	2,907	2,205	32A	160	SO012215	Ma,Sim,Hew,N,CoH,CoU,CoA
265	1782	Scotland	244	1092	Buidhe Bheinn	886	160	2,905	525	10A	33	NG963090	Ma,C,Sim
266	68	Scotland	245	53	Garbh Bheinn	885	687	2,904	2,254	18B	40	NM904622	Ma,C,Sim
267	790	Scotland	246	517	The Cobbler	884	256	2,900	840	01D	56	NN259058	Ma,C,Sim
268	1801	Scotland	247	1102	Cam Chreag	884	159	2,900	522	02B	50	NN375346	Ma,C,Sim
269	177	Scotland	248	123	Stob Dubh	883	521	2,897	1,709	03C	50	NN166488	Ma,C,Sim
270	171	Scotland	249	118	Beinn Odhar Bheag	882	524	2,894	1,719	18A	40	NM846778	Ma,C,Sim
271	42	Scotland	250	34	Rois-Bheinn	882	774	2,894	2,539	18A	40	NM756778	Ma,C,Sim
272	272	Scotland	251	195	Beinn Chuirn	880	446	2,887	1,463	01D	50	NN280292	Ma,C,Sim
273	183	Scotland	252	127	Sgurr Mhurlagain	880	515	2,887	1,690	10B	33	NN012944	Ma,C,Sim
274	699	Scotland	253	465	Creag Uchdag	879	273	2,884	896	01A	51 52	NN708323	Ma,C,Sim
275	168	Scotland	254	116	Ben Ledi	879	528	2,884	1,732	01C	57	NN562097	Ma,C,Sim
276	153	Scotland	255	105	Fraochaidh	879	551	2,884	1,808	03B	41	NN029517	Ma,C,Sim
277	132	Scotland	256	90	Sgurr a' Mhuilinn	879	580	2,884	1,903	12A	25	NH264557	Ma,C,Sim
278	315	Scotland	257	227	Sguman Coinntich	879	415	2,884	1,362	12B	25	NG977303	Ma,C,Sim
279	1598	Scotland	258	989	Càrn an Fhreiceadain	878	172	2,881	564	09B	35	NH725071	Ma,C,Sim
280	1112	Scotland	259	712	A' Chaoirnich	875	213	2,871	699	06A	42	NN735807	Ma,C,Sim
281	275	Scotland	260	198	Baosbheinn	875	443	2,871	1,453	13A	19 24	NG870654	Ma,C,Sim
282	1583	Scotland	261	978	Sgurr na Ba Glaise	874	173	2,867	568	18A	40	NM770777	Ma,C,Sim
283	16	Scotland	262	12	Goatfell	874	874	2,867	2,867	20C	62 69	NR991415	Ma,C,Sim,CoH,CoU,SIB
284	606	England	7	35	Fairfield	873	299	2,864	981	34C	90	NY358117	Ma,Sim,Hew,N,W,B,Sy,Fel
285	115	Scotland	263	81	Ben Hee	873	607	2,864	1,991	16B	16	NC426339	Ma,C,Sim
286	120	Wales	11	8	Moel Siabod	872	600	2,862	1,968	30B	115	SH705546	Ma,Sim,Hew,N
287	371	Scotland	264	261	Morven	872	387	2,861	1,270	21A	37	NJ376039	Ma,C,Sim
288	1186	Scotland	265	753	Sgorr nan Lochan Uaine	871	206	2,858	676	13B	25	NG969531	Ma,C,Sim
289	223	Scotland	266	158	Stob a' Choin	869	480	2,851	1,575	01C	56	NN417159	Ma,C,Sim
290	251	England	8	9	Blencathra - Hallsfell Top	868	461	2,848	1,512	34A	90	NY323277	Ma,Sim,Hew,N,W,B,Sy,Fel
291	1344	Scotland	267	847	Beinn Pharlagain	868	191	2,848	627	04B	42	NN448642	Ma,C,Sim
292	968	Scotland	268	626	Faochaig	868	230	2,848	755	12B	25	NH021317	Ma,C,Sim
293	485	Scotland	269	331	Garbh Bheinn	867	332	2,844	1,089	03A	41	NN169600	Ma,C,Sim
294	152	Scotland	270	104	Bidein a' Chabair	867	552	2,844	1,811	10D	33 40	NM889930	Ma,C,Sim
295	1392	Scotland	271	871	Conachcraig	865	187	2,838	614	07A	44	NO279865	Ma,C,Sim
296	1237	Scotland	272	780	Carn a' Choire Ghairbh	865	201	2,838	659	11B	34	NH136188	Ma,C,Sim
297	1698	Scotland	273	1041	Beinn Mhic Chasgaig	864	166	2,835	545	03C	41	NN221502	Ma,C,Sim
298	1139	Scotland	274	726	Creag an Dail Bheag	863	211	2,831	692	08B	36 43	NO157981	Ma,Sim,C
299	1006	Scotland	275	652	Beinn Tharsuinn	863	226	2,831	741	12A	25	NH055433	Ma,C,Sim
300	727	Scotland	276	486	Sgùrr na Feartaig	863	267	2,831	876	12A	25	NH055453	Ma,C,Sim
301	1699	Scotland	277	1042	Cam Chreag	862	166	2,828	545	02A	51	NN536491	Ma,C,Sim
302	1883	Scotland	278	1152	Meall na h-Aisre	862	155	2,828	509	09B	35	NH515000	Ma,C,Sim
303	895	Scotland	279	583	Beinn a' Bhathaich Ard	862	241	2,828	791	12A	26	NH360434	Ma,C,Sim
304	1884	Scotland	280	1153	Morrone	859	155	2,818	509	06B	43	NO132886	Ma,C,Sim
305	259	Scotland	281	184	Beinn Lair	859	455	2,818	1,493	14A	19	NG981732	Ma,C,Sim
306	296	Scotland	282	215	Caisteal Abhail	859	427	2,818	1,401	20C	62 69	NR969443	Ma,C,Sim
307	1436	Scotland	283	898	Beinn Luibhean	858	183	2,815	600	01D	56	NN242079	Ma,C,Sim
308	339	Scotland	284	242	Fraoch Bheinn	858	400	2,815	1,312	10B	33 40	NM986940	Ma,C,Sim
309	243	Scotland	285	174	Beinn a' Chrulaiste	857	464	2,812	1,522	03A	41	NN246566	Ma,C,Sim
310	573	Scotland	286	394	Cruach Innse	857	306	2,812	1,004	04A	41	NN279763	Ma,C,Sim
311	630	Scotland	287	423	Càrn Dearg Mòr	857	292	2,812	958	06A	35 43	NN823911	Ma,C,Sim
312	455	Scotland	288	315	Beinn a' Chaisgein Mor	856	345	2,808	1,132	14A	19	NG982785	Ma,C,Sim
313	969	Scotland	289	627	Stob an Aonaich Mhòir	855	230	2,805	755	05A	42	NN537694	Ma,C,Sim
314	564	Scotland	290	385	Beinn Bhuidhe	855	308	2,805	1,010	10B	33 40	NM821967	Ma,C,Sim
315	287	Scotland	291	207	Beinn an Eoin	855	434	2,805	1,424	13A	19	NG905646	Ma,C,Sim
316	225	Wales	12	12	Arenig Fawr	854	479	2,802	1,572	30D	124 125	SH827369	Ma,Sim,Hew,N
317	48	Scotland	292	39	Creach Bheinn	853	755	2,799	2,477	18C	49	NM870576	Ma,C,Sim
318	179	England	9	7	Grasmoor	852	519	2,795	1,703	34B	89 90	NY174203	Ma,Sim,Hew,N,W,B,Sy,Fel
319	297	Scotland	293	216	Meall an t-Seallaidh	852	427	2,795	1,401	01C	51	NN542234	Ma,C,Sim
320	92	Ireland	6	16	Baurtregaum	851	642	2,792	2,106	49B	71	Q749076	Ma,Sim,Hew,Dil,A,VL
321	28	Ireland	7	4	Slieve Donard; Highest in Northern Ireland	850	825	2,789	2,707	43B	29	J358276	Ma,Sim,Hew,Dil,A,VL,CoH,CoU
322	403	Ireland	8	79	Mullaghcleevaun	849	373	2,785	1,224	55B	56	O067070	Ma,Sim,Hew,Dil,A,VL
323	1411	Scotland	294	887	Beinn nan Imirean	849	185	2,785	607	02B	51	NN419309	Ma,C,Sim
324	479	Scotland	295	326	Bac an Eich	849	334	2,785	1,096	12A	25	NH222489	Ma,C,Sim
325	84	Scotland	296	63	Cul Mor	849	651	2,785	2,136	16F	15	NC162119	Ma,C,Sim
326	106	Scotland	297	76	Sgurr Ghiubhsachain	849	614	2,785	2,014	18B	40	NM875751	Ma,C,Sim
327	65	Scotland	298	51	Canisp	847	689	2,779	2,260	16F	15	NC202187	Ma,C,Sim
328	145	Scotland	299	98	Ben Donich	847	558	2,779	1,831	19C	56	NN218043	Ma,C,Sim
329	194	Scotland	300	134	Beinn Resipol	845	502	2,772	1,647	18B	40	NM766654	Ma,C,Sim
330	60	Scotland	301	46	Merrick	843	705	2,766	2,313	27B	77	NX427855	Ma,C,Sim,D,CoH,CoU,CoA
331	332	Scotland	302	238	Ben Vrackie	842	403	2,762	1,322	06B	43	NN950632	Ma,C,Sim
332	1208	Scotland	303	763	Carn Ban	842	204	2,762	669	15A	20	NH338875	Ma,C,Sim
333	1285	Scotland	304	812	Beinn Mholach	842	196	2,761	643	05A	42	NN587654	Ma,C,Sim
334	1802	England	10	149	St Sunday Crag	841	159	2,759	522	34C	90	NY369133	Ma,Sim,Hew,N,W,B,Sy,Fel
335	349	Scotland	305	246	Sgurr an Airgid	841	394	2,759	1,293	11A	25 33	NG940227	Ma,C,Sim
336	187	Scotland	306	130	Ben Rinnes	841	513	2,759	1,683	21A	28	NJ254354	Ma,C,Sim
337	1502	Ireland	9	339	Brandon Peak	840	178	2,756	584	49A	70	Q472094	Ma,Sim,Hew,Dil,A,VL
338	226	Scotland	307	159	Beinn Trilleachan	840	478	2,756	1,568	03B	50	NN086439	Ma,C,Sim
339	174	Scotland	308	121	Beinn Udlaidh	840	522	2,756	1,713	03C	50	NN280331	Ma,C,Sim
340	82	Scotland	309	62	Broad Law	840	653	2,756	2,142	28B	72	NT146235	Ma,C,Sim,D,CoH,CoU,CoA
341	1630	Scotland	310	1004	Sgurr Gaorsaic	839	170	2,753	558	11A	25 33	NH035218	Ma,C,Sim
342	252	Scotland	311	178	Carn Chuinneag	839	461	2,753	1,512	15B	20	NH483833	Ma,C,Sim
343	133	Ireland	10	29	Mangerton	838	580	2,750	1,903	52A	78	V980807	Ma,Sim,Hew,Dil,A,VL
344	261	Scotland	312	185	Meall na h-Eilde	838	453	2,749	1,486	10C	34	NN185946	Ma,C,Sim
345	1885	Scotland	313	1154	Meallan nan Uan	838	155	2,749	509	12A	25	NH263544	Ma,C,Sim
346	1187	Scotland	314	754	Sron a' Choire Chnapanich	837	206	2,746	676	02A	51	NN456453	Ma,C,Sim
347	1393	Scotland	315	872	Sgurr Cos na Breachd-laoidh	835	187	2,740	614	10B	33 40	NM947946	Ma,C,Sim
348	1503	Scotland	316	937	Creag nan Gabhar	834	178	2,736	584	07A	43	NO154841	Ma,C,Sim
349	825	Scotland	317	543	Carn Dearg	834	251	2,736	823	09C	34 41	NN345887	Ma,C,Sim
350	123	Ireland	11	26	Purple Mountain	832	593	2,730	1,946	50C	78	V886851	Ma,Sim,Hew,Dil,A,VL
351	453	Wales	13	25	Cadair Berwyn	832	346	2,730	1,135	30E	125	SJ071323	Ma,Sim,Hew,N,CoH,CoA
352	1238	Scotland	318	781	Beinn Dearg	830	201	2,723	659	02A	51	NN608497	Ma,C,Sim
353	618	Scotland	319	417	Brown Cow Hill	829	295	2,720	968	08B	36	NJ221044	Ma,C,Sim
354	107	Scotland	320	77	Carn Mor	829	613	2,720	2,011	10D	33 40	NM903909	Ma,C,Sim
355	404	England	11	20	High Street (Lake District)	828	373	2,717	1,224	34C	90	NY440110	Ma,Sim,Hew,N,W,B,Sy,Fel
356	951	Scotland	321	615	An Dùn	827	232	2,715	761	05B	42	NN716801	Ma,Sim,C
357	209	Ireland	12	43	Beenoskee	826	492	2,710	1,614	49B	70	Q580088	Ma,Sim,Hew,Dil,A,VL
358	931	Scotland	322	603	Beinn Tarsuinn	826	235	2,710	771	20C	62 69	NR960412	Ma,C,Sim
359	996	Scotland	323	644	Geal-charn Mor	824	227	2,703	745	09B	35	NH836123	Ma,C,Sim
360	1093	Scotland	324	702	Benvane	821	215	2,694	705	01C	57	NN535137	Ma,C,Sim
361	1584	Scotland	325	979	Geal Charn	821	173	2,694	568	08B	36	NJ090126	Ma,C,Sim
362	402	Scotland	326	280	White Coomb	821	374	2,694	1,227	28B	79	NT163150	Ma,C,Sim,D,CoH
363	1015	Scotland	327	657	Beinn Dearg Bheag	820	225	2,690	738	14A	19	NH019811	Ma,C,Sim
364	1472	Scotland	328	921	Beinn Chaorach	818	180	2,684	591	02B	50	NN358328	Ma,C,Sim
365	1036	Scotland	329	668	Carn na Drochaide	818	222	2,684	728	08B	36 43	NO127938	Ma,C,Sim
366	574	Scotland	330	395	Sgorr na Diollaid	818	306	2,684	1,004	12B	25	NH281362	Ma,C,Sim
367	1209	Ireland	13	273	Tonelagee	817	204	2,680	669	55B	56	O085015	Ma,Sim,Hew,Dil,A,VL
368	192	Scotland	331	133	Stob Coire Creagach	817	504	2,680	1,654	01D	50 56	NN230109	Ma,C,Sim
369	1239	Scotland	332	782	Carn Dearg	817	201	2,680	659	09B	34	NN349966	Ma,C,Sim
370	1504	Scotland	333	938	Carn a' Chuilinn	817	178	2,680	584	09B	34	NH416034	Ma,C,Sim
371	147	England	12	5	The Cheviot	815	556	2,674	1,824	33	74 75	NT909205	Ma,Sim,Hew,N,CoH,CoU,CoA
372	569	Scotland	334	390	Breabag	815	307	2,674	1,007	16E	15	NC286157	Ma,C,Sim
373	41	Ireland	14	6	Mweelrea	814	778	2,671	2,552	47A	37	L789668	Ma,Sim,Hew,Dil,A,VL,CoH,CoU
374	714	Scotland	335	478	An Sithean	814	270	2,671	886	12A	25	NH171453	Ma,C,Sim
375	797	Scotland	336	524	An Stac	814	255	2,671	837	18A	40	NM762792	Ma,C,Sim
376	212	Scotland	337	149	Corserine	814	488	2,671	1,601	27B	77	NX497870	Ma,C,Sim,D
377	1830	Scotland	338	1121	Beinn Each	813	158	2,667	518	01B	57	NN601158	Ma,C,Sim
378	940	Scotland	339	609	Sgor Mor	813	234	2,667	768	08A	43	NO007914	Ma,C,Sim
379	33	Scotland	340	26	Askival	812	812	2,664	2,664	17D	39	NM393952	Ma,C,Sim,SIB
380	1631	Scotland	341	1005	Carn na Saobhaidhe	811	170	2,661	558	09B	35	NH598144	Ma,C,Sim
381	102	Wales	14	6	Waun Fach	811	622	2,661	2,041	32A	161	SO215299	Ma,Sim,Hew,N
382	864	Scotland	342	566	Creach Bheinn	810	245	2,657	804	03B	50	NN023422	Ma,C,Sim
383	283	Scotland	343	205	Meall a' Bhuachaille	810	436	2,657	1,430	08A	36	NH990115	Ma,C,Sim
384	922	Scotland	344	599	Meall na Fearna	809	236	2,654	774	01B	57	NN650186	Ma,C,Sim
385	1087	Scotland	345	697	Sgùrr Innse	809	216	2,654	709	04A	41	NN290748	Ma,C,Sim
386	155	Scotland	346	107	Quinag - Sail Gharbh	809	550	2,654	1,804	16E	15	NC209292	Ma,C,Sim
387	1113	Scotland	347	713	Creag Mac Ranaich	809	213	2,653	699	01C	51	NN545255	Ma,C,Sim
388	1458	Scotland	348	911	Garbh-bheinn	808	181	2,651	594	17B	32	NG531232	Ma,C,Sim
389	1249	Scotland	349	791	Hart Fell	808	200	2,651	656	28B	78	NT113135	Ma,C,Sim,D
390	423	England	13	22	High Stile	807	362	2,648	1,188	34B	89 90	NY170148	Ma,Sim,Hew,N,B,Sy,Fel
391	1262	Scotland	350	799	Monamenach	807	199	2,648	653	07A	43	NO176706	Ma,C,Sim
392	264	Scotland	351	188	Creag Rainich	807	451	2,648	1,480	14A	19	NH096751	Ma,C,Sim
393	44	Ireland	15	7	Nephin	806	768	2,644	2,520	46B	23 31	G103079	Ma,Sim,Hew,Dil,A,VL
394	772	Scotland	352	506	Beinn nam Fuaran	806	260	2,644	853	02B	50	NN361381	Ma,C,Sim
395	1101	Scotland	353	708	Meall nan Subh	806	214	2,644	702	02B	51	NN460397	Ma,C,Sim
396	1224	Scotland	354	773	Ben Gulabin	806	203	2,644	666	06B	43	NO100722	Ma,C,Sim
397	273	Scotland	355	196	Beinn Iaruinn	805	446	2,641	1,463	09C	34	NN296900	Ma,C,Sim
398	1240	Scotland	356	783	Beinn na h-Eaglaise	805	201	2,641	659	10A	33	NG854120	Ma,C,Sim
399	1866	Scotland	357	1138	Geal Charn	804	156	2,638	512	10C	34	NN156942	Ma,C,Sim
400	444	Scotland	358	307	Carn Mor	804	349	2,638	1,145	21A	37	NJ265183	Ma,C,Sim
401	1831	Ireland	16	416	Ben Lugmore	803	158	2,635	518	47A	37	L811673	Ma,Sim,Hew,Dil,A,VL
402	1700	Scotland	359	1043	The Sow of Atholl	803	166	2,635	545	05A	42	NN625741	Ma,C,Sim
403	302	Wales	15	16	Fan Brycheiniog	803	425	2,633	1,394	32A	160	SN824220	Ma,Sim,Hew,N
404	316	England	14	12	The Old Man of Coniston	802	415	2,633	1,362	34D	96 97	SD272978	Ma,Sim,Hew,N,W,B,Sy,Fel,CoH
405	1459	England	15	113	Kirk Fell	802	181	2,631	594	34B	89 90	NY194104	Ma,Sim,Hew,N,W,B,Sy,Fel
406	1783	Ireland	17	403	Greenane	802	160	2,631	525	53A	74	R925239	Ma,Sim,Hew,Dil,A,VL
407	1094	Scotland	360	703	Beinn Bhreac-liath	802	215	2,631	705	03C	50	NN302339	Ma,C,Sim
408	445	Scotland	361	308	Meallan Liath Coire Mhic Dhughaill	801	349	2,628	1,145	16B	15	NC357391	Ma,C,Sim
409	143	Scotland	362	97	Cranstackie	801	560	2,628	1,837	16B	9	NC350556	Ma,C,Sim
410	1553	Scotland	363	962	Cir Mhor	799	175	2,621	574	20C	62 69	NR972431	Ma,C,Sim
411	35	Scotland	364	28	An Cliseam	799	799	2,621	2,621	24B	13 14	NB154073	Ma,C,Sim,CoU,CoA,SIB
412	1471	Wales	16	104	Pen Llithrig y Wrach	799	180	2,620	592	30B	115	SH716622	Ma,Sim,Hew,N
413	963	Scotland	365	622	Am Bathach	798	231	2,618	758	11A	33	NH073143	Ma,C,Sim
414	288	Scotland	366	208	Beinn Dronaig	797	434	2,615	1,424	12A	25	NH037381	Ma,C,Sim
415	130	Scotland	367	89	Cairnsmore of Carsphairn	797	582	2,615	1,909	27C	77	NX594979	Ma,C,Sim,D
416	306	Scotland	368	220	Beinn Mhic-Mhonaidh	796	420	2,612	1,378	03C	50	NN208350	Ma,C,Sim
417	253	Scotland	369	179	Mam na Gualainn	796	461	2,612	1,512	04A	41	NN115625	Ma,C,Sim
418	584	Scotland	370	400	Sgurr Coire Choinnichean	796	304	2,612	997	10B	33	NG790010	Ma,C,Sim
419	197	Scotland	371	137	Sgurr an Utha	796	499	2,612	1,637	10D	40	NM885839	Ma,C,Sim
420	202	Scotland	372	141	Beinn Bhan	796	495	2,612	1,624	10D	34 41	NN140857	Ma,C,Sim
421	51	Ireland	18	8	Mount Leinster	794	726	2,606	2,382	54B	68	S826525	Ma,Sim,Hew,Dil,A,VL,CoH,CoU
422	71	Ireland	19	13	Knockmealdown	792	678	2,600	2,224	54A	74	S057084	Ma,Sim,Hew,Dil,A,VL,CoH,CoU
423	98	Ireland	20	19	Fauscoum	792	628	2,598	2,060	54A	75	S316105	Ma,Sim,Hew,Dil,A,VL
424	368	Scotland	373	260	Glas Bheinn	792	388	2,598	1,273	04A	41	NN258641	Ma,C,Sim
425	1867	Scotland	374	1139	Carn Ealasaid	792	156	2,598	512	08B	36	NJ227117	Ma,C,Sim
426	1148	Scotland	375	733	Sgùrr a' Chaorachain	792	210	2,598	689	13B	24	NG796417	Ma,C,Sim
427	227	Scotland	376	160	Beinn Airigh Charr	792	477	2,598	1,565	14A	19	NG930761	Ma,C,Sim
428	203	Scotland	377	142	Beinn Leoid	792	495	2,598	1,624	16E	15	NC320294	Ma,C,Sim
429	1365	England	16	103	Grisedale Pike	791	189	2,595	620	34B	89 90	NY198225	Ma,Sim,Hew,N,W,B,Sy,Fel
430	1121	England	17	81	Mickle Fell	790	212	2,592	696	35A	91 92	NY806245	Ma,Sim,Hew,N,CoH,CoU,CoA
431	1140	Scotland	378	727	Auchnafree Hill	789	211	2,589	692	01A	52	NN808308	Ma,C,Sim
432	434	Scotland	379	300	Druim nan Cnamh	789	354	2,589	1,161	10A	34	NH130076	Ma,C,Sim
433	159	Scotland	380	111	Meall Dubh	789	544	2,589	1,785	10C	34	NH245078	Ma,C,Sim
434	307	Scotland	381	221	Meall Tairneachan	787	420	2,582	1,378	02A	52	NN807543	Ma,C,Sim
435	668	Scotland	382	445	Beinn a' Chaisteil	787	280	2,582	919	15B	20	NH369801	Ma,C,Sim
436	355	Scotland	383	251	Arkle (Sutherland)	787	392	2,582	1,286	16B	9	NC302461	Ma,C,Sim
437	333	Scotland	384	239	The Brack	787	403	2,582	1,322	19C	56	NN245030	Ma,C,Sim
438	1993	Scotland	385	1217	Kirriereoch Hill	787	150	2,581	493	27B	77	NX420869	Ma,Sim,D,xC
439	386	Scotland	386	271	Càrn na Nathrach	786	382	2,579	1,253	18B	40	NM886698	Ma,C,Sim
440	525	Scotland	387	359	Beinn na Caillich	785	317	2,575	1,040	10B	33	NG795066	Ma,C,Sim
441	39	Scotland	388	32	Beinn an Oir	785	785	2,575	2,575	20A	60 61	NR498749	Ma,C,Sim,SIB
442	205	Ireland	21	42	Stumpa Duloigh	784	494	2,572	1,621	50B	78	V786793	Ma,Sim,Hew,Dil,A,VL
443	1381	Ireland	22	311	Temple Hill	783	188	2,569	617	53A	74	R833218	Ma,Sim,Hew,Dil,A,VL
444	614	Scotland	389	414	Beinn Mhic Cedidh	783	296	2,569	971	18A	40	NM828788	Ma,C,Sim
445	128	Wales	17	9	Moel Hebog	783	585	2,569	1,919	30B	115	SH564469	Ma,Sim,Hew,N
446	1409	Scotland	390	885	Farragon Hill	782	186	2,567	609	02A	52	NN840553	Ma,C,Sim
447	1095	Scotland	391	704	Sgurr Dubh	782	215	2,566	705	13B	25	NG979557	Ma,C,Sim
448	502	Scotland	392	344	Ainshval	781	326	2,562	1,070	17D	39	NM378943	Ma,C,Sim
449	679	Scotland	393	452	Corryhabbie Hill	781	278	2,562	912	21A	37	NJ280288	Ma,C,Sim
450	526	Scotland	394	360	Sgurr Mhic Bharraich	779	317	2,556	1,040	10A	33	NG917173	Ma,C,Sim
451	146	Scotland	395	99	Beinn Bheula	779	557	2,556	1,827	19C	56	NS154983	Ma,C,Sim
452	1096	Wales	18	72	Glasgwm	779	215	2,556	705	30E	124 125	SH836194	Ma,Sim,Hew,N
453	1540	Scotland	396	956	Meall nam Maigheach	779	176	2,555	577	02B	51	NN586435	Ma,C,Sim
454	649	Scotland	397	434	Mount Battock	778	286	2,552	938	07B	44	NO549844	Ma,C,Sim,CoH
455	489	Scotland	398	333	Meall na Leitreach	777	331	2,550	1,086	05A	42	NN640702	Ma,C,Sim
456	749	Scotland	399	497	Meall Horn	777	264	2,549	866	16B	9	NC352449	Ma,C,Sim
457	773	England	18	47	Red Screes	776	260	2,546	853	34C	90	NY396087	Ma,Sim,Hew,N,W,B,Sy,Fel
458	1832	Scotland	400	1122	Quinag - Sail Gorm	776	158	2,546	518	16E	15	NC198304	Ma,C,Sim
459	1803	Scotland	401	1103	Glas Bheinn	776	159	2,546	522	16E	15	NC254265	Ma,C,Sim
460	214	Scotland	402	151	Glamaig - Sgurr Mhairi	775	486	2,543	1,594	17B	32	NG513300	Ma,C,Sim
461	1394	Scotland	403	873	Sgorr Craobh a' Chaorainn	775	187	2,543	614	18B	40	NM895757	Ma,C,Sim
462	1322	Scotland	404	836	Shalloch on Minnoch	774	194	2,540	635	27B	77	NX407905	Ma,C,Sim,D
463	997	Scotland	405	645	Beinn nan Caorach	774	227	2,539	745	10A	33	NG871121	Ma,C,Sim
464	237	Scotland	406	168	Meall a' Phubuill	774	468	2,539	1,535	10D	41	NN029854	Ma,C,Sim
465	185	Ireland	23	38	Mullaghanattin	773	514	2,536	1,686	50B	78	V738772	Ma,Sim,Hew,Dil,A,VL
466	1141	Scotland	407	728	Beinn Spionnaidh	773	211	2,536	692	16B	9	NC361572	Ma,C,Sim
467	59	Ireland	24	9	Barrclashcame	772	706	2,533	2,316	47A	37	L849695	Ma,Sim,Hew,Dil,A,VL
468	230	Ireland	25	47	Coomacarrea	772	474	2,533	1,555	50A	78 83	V611825	Ma,Sim,Hew,Dil,A,VL
469	851	Scotland	408	559	Meall Lighiche	772	247	2,533	810	03B	41	NN094528	Ma,C,Sim
470	420	Scotland	409	291	Beinn Stacach	771	363	2,530	1,191	01C	57	NN474163	Ma,C,Sim
471	136	Scotland	410	92	Stob Coire a' Chearcaill	771	575	2,530	1,886	18B	41	NN016726	Ma,C,Sim
472	777	Scotland	411	508	Druim Tarsuinn	770	259	2,526	850	18B	40	NM874727	Ma,C,Sim
473	375	Wales	19	21	Moelwyn Mawr	770	385	2,526	1,263	30B	124	SH658448	Ma,Sim,Hew,N
474	1632	Wales	20	121	Waun Rydd	769	170	2,524	558	32A	160	SO062206	Ma,Sim,Hew,N
475	952	Scotland	412	616	Meallach Mhor	769	232	2,523	761	06A	35	NN776908	Ma,C,Sim
476	157	Scotland	413	109	Cul Beag	769	546	2,523	1,791	16F	15	NC140088	Ma,C,Sim
477	456	Scotland	414	316	Beinn a' Chòin	769	345	2,522	1,132	01C	50 56	NN354130	Ma,C,Sim
478	1286	Scotland	415	813	Carn Dearg	768	196	2,520	643	09B	34	NN357948	Ma,C,Sim
479	1420	Ireland	26	318	Slieve Commedagh	767	184	2,516	604	43B	29	J346286	Ma,Sim,Hew,Dil,A,VL
480	508	Scotland	416	349	Sail Mhòr	767	322	2,516	1,056	14A	19	NH032887	Ma,C,Sim
481	667	Scotland	417	444	Beinn Liath Mhor a' Ghiubhais Li	766	281	2,513	922	14B	20	NH280713	Ma,C,Sim
482	78	Scotland	418	58	Dun da Ghaoithe	766	659	2,513	2,162	17E	49	NM672362	Ma,C,Sim
483	1007	Scotland	419	653	Fuar Bheinn	766	226	2,513	741	18C	49	NM853563	Ma,C,Sim
484	689	Scotland	420	458	Bràigh nan Uamhachan	765	276	2,510	906	10D	40	NM975866	Ma,C,Sim
485	112	Scotland	421	80	Ben Loyal - An Caisteal	764	609	2,507	1,998	16B	10	NC578488	Ma,C,Sim
486	94	Ireland	27	17	Croagh Patrick	764	638	2,507	2,093	47A	30	L905802	Ma,Sim,Hew,Dil,A,VL
487	387	Scotland	422	272	Meall an Fhudair	764	382	2,507	1,253	01D	50 56	NN270192	Ma,C,Sim
488	1335	Scotland	423	844	Quinag - Spidean Coinich	764	192	2,507	630	16E	15	NC206277	Ma,C,Sim
489	690	Scotland	424	459	Cnoc Coinnich	764	276	2,505	906	19C	56	NN233007	Ma,C,Sim,xG
490	1615	England	19	127	Stony Cove Pike	763	171	2,503	561	34C	90	NY417100	Ma,Sim,Hew,N,W,B,Sy,Fel
491	838	Scotland	425	551	Little Wyvis	763	249	2,503	817	15B	20	NH429644	Ma,C,Sim
492	721	Scotland	426	481	Beinn na h-Uamha	762	269	2,501	883	18B	40	NM917664	Ma,C,Sim
493	661	England	20	39	High Raise	762	283	2,500	928	34B	89 90	NY280095	Ma,Sim,Hew,N,W,B,Sy,Fel
494	291	Scotland	427	211	Beinn Talaidh	762	430	2,499	1,411	17E	49	NM625347	Ma,G,Sim,xC
495	1194	Scotland	428	757	Sgurr a' Chaorainn	761	205	2,495	673	18B	40	NM894662	Ma,G,Sim
496	1022	Scotland	429	659	Shee of Ardtalnaig	759	224	2,490	735	01A	51 52	NN729351	Ma,G,Sim
497	783	Scotland	430	512	Beinn a' Chapuill	759	258	2,490	846	10A	33	NG835148	Ma,G,Sim
498	1161	Scotland	431	742	Carn an Tionail	759	209	2,489	686	16B	16	NC392390	Ma,G,Sim
499	750	Ireland	28	165	Kippure	757	264	2,484	866	55B	56	O115154	Ma,Sim,Hew,Dil,A,VL,CoH,CoU
500	592	Scotland	432	404	Beinn Shiantaidh	757	303	2,484	994	20A	61	NR513747	Ma,G,Sim
501	360	Scotland	433	254	Creag Dhubh	756	391	2,480	1,283	09B	35	NN677972	Ma,G,Sim
502	142	Wales	21	10	Y Llethr	756	561	2,480	1,841	30D	124	SH661257	Ma,Sim,Hew,N
503	638	Ireland	29	136	Knockanaffrin	755	289	2,477	948	54A	75	S285152	Ma,Sim,Hew,Dil,A,VL
504	1149	Scotland	434	734	Cook's Cairn	755	210	2,477	689	21A	37	NJ302278	Ma,G,Sim,xC
505	978	Scotland	435	633	The Stob	754	229	2,472	751	01C	51	NN491231	Ma,G,Sim
506	344	England	21	16	Dale Head	753	397	2,470	1,302	34B	89 90	NY222153	Ma,Sim,Hew,N,W,B,Sy,Fel
507	1701	Ireland	30	391	Beann	752	166	2,467	545	50B	78	V725764	Ma,Sim,Hew,Dil,A,VL
508	170	Wales	22	11	Pumlumon Fawr	752	526	2,467	1,726	31A	135	SN789869	Ma,Sim,Hew,N,CoH,CoU
509	69	Ireland	31	11	Errigal	751	685	2,464	2,247	45B	01	B928207	Ma,Sim,Hew,Dil,A,VL,CoH,CoU
510	1188	Wales	23	79	Moel Llyfnant	751	206	2,464	676	30D	124 125	SH808351	Ma,Sim,Hew,N
511	1210	Scotland	436	764	Meallan a' Chuail	750	204	2,461	669	16E	15	NC344292	Ma,G,Sim
512	687	Scotland	437	457	Sgurr Choinnich	749	277	2,457	909	10C	34	NN127949	Ma,G,Sim
513	575	Scotland	438	396	Groban	749	306	2,457	1,004	14B	19	NH099708	Ma,G,Sim
514	1305	Scotland	439	824	Mona Gowan	749	194	2,457	636	21A	37	NJ335058	Ma,G,Sim
515	441	Scotland	440	305	Culter Fell	748	350	2,454	1,148	28B	72	NT052290	Ma,G,Sim,D,CoH,CoU
516	359	Scotland	441	253	Binnein Shuas	747	391	2,451	1,284	04B	34 42	NN462826	Ma,G,Sim
517	932	Wales	24	59	Yr Aran	747	235	2,451	771	30B	115	SH604515	Ma,Sim,Hew,N
518	1352	England	22	102	Burnhope Seat	747	190	2,451	623	35A	91	NY784375	Ma,Sim,Hew,N
519	764	Scotland	442	503	Meall Mor	747	262	2,451	860	01C	50 56	NN383151	Ma,G,Sim
520	446	Ireland	32	88	Slieve Binnian	746	349	2,447	1,145	43B	29	J320233	Ma,Sim,Hew,Dil,A,VL
521	607	Ireland	33	125	Broaghnabinnia	745	299	2,444	981	50B	78	V801814	Ma,Sim,Hew,Dil,A,VL
522	933	Scotland	443	604	Meall a' Mhuic	745	235	2,444	771	02A	42 51	NN579508	Ma,G,Sim
523	741	Scotland	444	491	Meall nan Gabhar	744	265	2,441	869	01D	50	NN235240	Ma,G,Sim
524	340	Scotland	445	243	Mount Blair	744	400	2,441	1,312	07A	43	NO167629	Ma,G,Sim
525	182	Scotland	446	126	Druim Fada	744	516	2,441	1,693	10D	41	NN086824	Ma,G,Sim
526	874	Scotland	447	573	Dun Rig	744	243	2,441	797	28B	73	NT253315	Ma,G,Sim,D
527	549	Scotland	448	377	Geallaig Hill	743	312	2,438	1,024	08B	37 44	NO297981	Ma,G,Sim
528	1382	Scotland	449	865	Creag Liath	743	188	2,438	617	09B	35	NH663007	Ma,G,Sim
529	798	Scotland	450	525	Beinn nan Eun	743	255	2,438	837	15B	20	NH448759	Ma,G,Sim
530	81	Scotland	451	61	Ben Mor Coigach	743	655	2,438	2,149	16F	15	NC093042	Ma,G,Sim
531	1868	Scotland	452	1140	Pap of Glencoe	742	156	2,434	512	03A	41	NN125594	Ma,G,Sim
532	865	Scotland	453	567	Cnap Cruinn	742	245	2,434	804	04A	41	NN302774	Ma,G,Sim
533	856	Scotland	454	563	Sgurr Dearg	741	246	2,431	807	17E	49	NM665339	Ma,G,Sim
534	61	Scotland	455	47	Beinn Mhor	741	696	2,431	2,283	19C	56	NS107908	Ma,G,Sim
535	1907	Scotland	456	1169	Badandun Hill	740	154	2,428	505	07A	44	NO207678	Ma,G,Sim
536	585	Ireland	34	116	Slieve Bearnagh	739	304	2,425	997	43B	29	J313280	Ma,Sim,Hew,Dil,A,VL
537	442	Scotland	457	306	Stob na Cruaiche	739	350	2,425	1,148	03A	41	NN363571	Ma,G,Sim
538	54	Scotland	458	43	Sgurr na Coinnich	739	714	2,425	2,343	17C	33	NG762222	Ma,G,Sim
539	139	Scotland	459	95	Beinn Mheadhoin	739	568	2,425	1,864	18C	49	NM799514	Ma,G,Sim
540	759	Scotland	460	501	Meall Mor	738	263	2,421	863	15B	20	NH515745	Ma,G,Sim
541	1769	England	23	147	Robinson	737	161	2,418	528	34B	89 90	NY201168	Ma,Sim,Hew,N,W,B,Sy,Fel
542	1967	England	24	171	Seat Sandal	737	152	2,417	498	34C	90	NY344115	Ma,Sim,Hew,N,W,B,Sy,Fel
543	323	England	25	15	Whernside	736	408	2,415	1,339	35B	98	SD738814	Ma,Sim,Hew,N,CoH,CoU,CoA
544	580	Scotland	461	398	Beinn na h-Eaglaise	736	305	2,415	1,001	13B	25	NG908523	Ma,G,Sim
545	318	Scotland	462	228	Marsco	736	413	2,415	1,355	17B	32	NG507251	Ma,G,Sim
546	1250	Scotland	463	792	Beinn Bheag	736	200	2,415	656	18B	40	NM914635	Ma,G,Sim
547	161	Ireland	35	33	Blackstairs Mountain	735	540	2,411	1,772	54B	68	S810447	Ma,Sim,Hew,Dil,A,VL
548	219	Scotland	464	155	Druim na Sgriodain	735	482	2,410	1,581	18B	40	NM978656	Ma,G,Sim
549	63	Scotland	465	49	Doune Hill	734	695	2,408	2,280	01E	56	NS290970	Ma,G,Sim
550	343	Wales	25	18	Craig Cwm Silyn	734	398	2,408	1,306	30B	115	SH525502	Ma,Sim,Hew,N
551	562	Wales	26	32	Rhobell Fawr	734	309	2,408	1,014	30D	124	SH786256	Ma,Sim,Hew,N
552	619	Wales	27	35	Fan Fawr	734	295	2,408	968	32A	160	SN969193	Ma,Sim,Hew,N
553	426	Scotland	466	294	Beinn a' Chaolais	733	359	2,405	1,178	20A	60 61	NR488734	Ma,G,Sim
554	631	Scotland	467	424	Glas Bheinn	732	292	2,402	958	10C	34	NN171918	Ma,G,Sim
555	481	Scotland	468	327	Sgurr a' Gharaidh	732	333	2,402	1,093	13B	24	NG884443	Ma,G,Sim
556	1649	Scotland	469	1012	Sabhal Beag	732	169	2,402	554	16B	9	NC373429	Ma,G,Sim
557	62	Scotland	470	48	Beinn na Caillich	732	696	2,402	2,283	17C	32	NG601232	Ma,G,Sim
558	1908	Scotland	471	1170	Beinn na Caillich	732	154	2,402	505	17C	33	NG770229	Ma,G,Sim
559	840	Scotland	472	553	Stob an Eas	732	248	2,402	814	19C	56	NN185074	Ma,G,Sim
560	305	Scotland	473	219	Green Lowther	732	424	2,402	1,391	27C	71 78	NS900120	Ma,G,Sim,D
561	201	Scotland	474	140	Suilven	731	496	2,398	1,627	16F	15	NC153183	Ma,G,Sim
562	530	Scotland	475	364	Beinn Dearg Mhor	731	316	2,398	1,037	17B	32	NG520284	Ma,G,Sim
563	645	Scotland	476	430	Beinn na Gainimh	729	287	2,393	942	01A	52	NN837344	Ma,G,Sim
564	158	Scotland	477	110	Ben Venue	729	545	2,392	1,788	01C	57	NN474063	Ma,G,Sim
565	1554	Scotland	478	963	Meall Doire Faid	729	175	2,392	574	15A	20	NH220792	Ma,G,Sim
566	220	Scotland	479	156	Uisgneabhal Mor	729	482	2,392	1,581	24B	13 14	NB120085	Ma,G,Sim
567	1052	Scotland	480	676	Carnan Cruithneachd	728	220	2,388	722	11A	25 33	NG994258	Ma,G,Sim
568	1345	Scotland	481	848	Mullach Coire nan Geur-oirean	727	191	2,385	627	10D	41	NN049892	Ma,G,Sim
569	1770	Scotland	482	1084	Mam Hael	726	161	2,382	528	03B	50	NN008408	Ma,G,Sim
570	778	Wales	28	46	Moel Eilio	726	259	2,382	850	30B	115	SH555577	Ma,Sim,Hew,N
571	410	Scotland	483	285	Beinn a' Chearcaill	725	368	2,379	1,207	13A	19	NG930637	Ma,G,Sim
572	70	Ireland	36	12	Binn Bhan	725	682	2,379	2,238	47B	37	L785539	Ma,Sim,Hew,Dil,A,VL,CoH,CoU
573	1225	Ireland	37	277	Djouce	725	203	2,379	666	55B	56	O178103	Ma,Sim,Hew,Dil,A,VL
574	669	Wales	29	38	Fan Gyhirych	725	280	2,379	919	32A	160	SN880191	Ma,Sim,Hew,N
575	298	England	26	10	Ingleborough	724	427	2,375	1,401	35B	98	SD741745	Ma,Sim,Hew,N
576	449	Scotland	484	310	Meall nan Damh	723	347	2,372	1,138	18B	40	NM919744	Ma,G,Sim
577	998	Scotland	485	646	Meall Mheinnidh	722	227	2,369	745	14A	19	NG954748	Ma,G,Sim
578	492	Scotland	486	336	Creagan a' Chaise	722	330	2,369	1,083	21A	36	NJ104241	Ma,G,Sim
579	376	Scotland	487	263	Beinn Bharrain - Mullach Buidhe	721	385	2,367	1,263	20C	62 69	NR901427	Ma,G,Sim
580	87	Ireland	38	14	Slieve Carr	721	648	2,365	2,126	46B	23	F914144	Ma,Sim,Hew,Dil,A,VL
581	90	Ireland	39	15	Slievenamon	721	643	2,365	2,110	54B	67	S297307	Ma,Sim,Hew,Dil,A,VL
582	1097	Scotland	488	705	Stob Mhic Bheathain	721	215	2,365	705	18B	40	NM914713	Ma,G,Sim
583	799	Scotland	489	526	The Buck	721	255	2,365	837	21A	37	NJ412233	Ma,G,Sim
584	121	Scotland	490	83	Ben Cleuch	721	595	2,365	1,952	26A	58	NN902006	Ma,G,Sim,D,CoH,CoU
585	167	Scotland	491	115	Ben Stack	720	531	2,362	1,742	16E	9	NC269422	Ma,G,Sim
586	421	Wales	30	24	Rhinog Fawr	720	363	2,362	1,191	30D	124	SH656290	Ma,Sim,Hew,N
587	700	Scotland	492	466	Meall Buidhe	719	273	2,359	896	01A	51	NN576275	Ma,G,Sim
588	74	Scotland	493	55	The Storr	719	671	2,359	2,201	17A	23	NG495540	Ma,G,Sim
589	1030	Scotland	494	664	An Stac	718	223	2,356	732	10D	40	NM866889	Ma,G,Sim
590	186	Scotland	495	129	Ben Buie	717	514	2,352	1,686	17E	49	NM604270	Ma,G,Sim
591	262	Scotland	496	186	Lamachan Hill	717	453	2,352	1,486	27B	77	NX435769	Ma,G,Sim,D
592	613	England	27	36	Great Shunner Fell	716	297	2,349	974	35A	98	SD848972	Ma,Sim,Hew,N
593	817	Scotland	497	537	Beinn Mheadhonach	715	252	2,346	827	03B	50	NN019368	Ma,G,Sim
594	1804	Scotland	498	1104	Cnap Chaochan Aitinn	715	159	2,346	522	08B	36	NJ145099	Ma,G,Sim
595	162	Ireland	40	34	Corranabinnia	714	540	2,343	1,772	46B	30	F903031	Ma,Sim,Hew,Dil,A,VL
596	390	Scotland	499	274	Beinn Chaorach	713	381	2,339	1,250	01E	56	NS287923	Ma,G,Sim
597	413	Scotland	500	287	Creag Mhor	713	367	2,339	1,204	16D	16	NC698240	Ma,G,Sim
598	1287	Scotland	501	814	Creag Ruadh	712	196	2,336	643	01A	51	NN673292	Ma,G,Sim
599	586	Ireland	41	117	Binn Chorr	711	304	2,333	997	47B	37	L811522	Ma,Sim,Hew,Dil,A,VL
600	372	Scotland	502	262	Beinn nan Ramh	711	386	2,333	1,266	14B	19	NH139661	Ma,G,Sim
601	278	Scotland	503	201	Tinto	711	442	2,333	1,450	27A	72	NS953343	Ma,G,Sim,D
602	175	Scotland	504	122	Cairnsmore of Fleet	711	522	2,333	1,713	27B	83	NX501670	Ma,G,Sim,D
603	217	Scotland	505	153	Druim Fada	711	484	2,332	1,588	10A	33	NG894083	Ma,G,Sim
604	885	England	28	59	Knott	710	242	2,329	794	34A	89 90	NY296329	Ma,Sim,Hew,N,W,B,Sy,Fel
605	503	Scotland	506	345	Meith Bheinn	710	325	2,329	1,066	10D	40	NM821872	Ma,G,Sim
606	1541	Scotland	507	957	Beinn Tharsuinn	710	176	2,329	577	15B	20	NH412829	Ma,G,Sim
607	1486	Scotland	508	925	Carn a' Ghille Chearr	710	179	2,329	587	21A	36	NJ139298	Ma,G,Sim,CoH
608	428	Scotland	509	295	Beinn a' Mhanaich	709	358	2,326	1,175	01E	56	NS269946	Ma,G,Sim
609	900	Scotland	510	588	Beinn nan Lus	709	240	2,326	787	03C	50	NN130375	Ma,G,Sim
610	1946	Scotland	511	1193	Beinn Dearg Mhor	709	152	2,326	499	17C	32	NG587228	Ma,G,Sim
611	1211	Wales	31	85	Trum y Ddysgl	709	204	2,326	669	30B	115	SH544516	Ma,Sim,Hew,N
612	438	Scotland	512	303	Creag na h-Eararuidh	708	353	2,324	1,158	01B	57	NN685190	Ma,G,Sim
613	457	England	29	26	Wild Boar Fell	708	344	2,323	1,129	35A	98	SD758987	Ma,Sim,Hew,N
614	111	Ireland	42	21	Knockboy	706	610	2,316	2,001	52A	85	W004620	Ma,Sim,Hew,Dil,A,VL,CoH,CoU
615	722	Scotland	513	482	Carn a' Chaochain	706	269	2,316	883	11B	34	NH235177	Ma,G,Sim
616	137	Scotland	514	93	Morven	706	574	2,316	1,883	16C	17	ND004285	Ma,G,Sim,CoH
617	1526	England	30	117	Pike of Blisco	705	177	2,313	581	34B	89 90	NY271042	Ma,Sim,Hew,N,W,B,Sy,Fel
618	1460	Scotland	515	912	Hunt Hill	705	181	2,313	594	07B	44	NO380805	Ma,G,Sim
619	915	Scotland	516	596	An Cruachan	705	237	2,313	778	12B	25	NH093358	Ma,G,Sim
620	1366	Scotland	517	854	Meall a' Chaorainn	705	189	2,313	620	14B	19	NH135604	Ma,G,Sim
621	875	Scotland	518	574	Ben Armine	705	243	2,313	797	16D	16	NC694273	Ma,G,Sim
622	1784	Scotland	519	1093	Sgurr an Fhidhleir	705	160	2,313	525	16F	15	NC094054	Ma,G,Sim
623	527	Scotland	520	361	Corra-bheinn	705	317	2,313	1,040	17E	48	NM573321	Ma,G,Sim
624	642	England	31	38	Great Whernside	704	288	2,310	945	35B	98	SE002739	Ma,Sim,Hew,N
625	1805	Scotland	521	1105	Beinn Eich	703	159	2,306	522	01E	56	NS302946	Ma,G,Sim
626	1909	Wales	32	149	Black Mountain	703	154	2,306	505	32A	161	SO255350	Ma,Sim,Hew,N,CoH,CoU,CoA
627	400	Scotland	522	278	Beinn Lochain	703	375	2,306	1,232	19C	56	NN160006	Ma,G,Sim
628	1288	Ireland	43	292	Slievelamagan	702	196	2,304	643	43B	29	J328260	Ma,Sim,Hew,Dil,A,VL
629	1181	England	32	86	Buckden Pike	702	207	2,303	679	35B	98	SD960787	Ma,Sim,Hew,N
630	97	Ireland	44	18	Binn idir an Da Log	702	629	2,303	2,064	47C	37	L888528	Ma,Sim,Hew,Dil,A,VL
631	751	Scotland	523	498	Duchray Hill	702	264	2,303	866	07A	43	NO161672	Ma,G,Sim
632	857	Scotland	524	564	Belig	702	246	2,303	807	17B	32	NG543240	Ma,G,Sim
633	1367	Scotland	525	855	Trollabhal	702	189	2,303	620	17D	39	NM377952	Ma,G,Sim
634	1571	Scotland	526	973	Beinn Fhada	702	174	2,303	571	17E	47 48	NM540349	Ma,G,Sim
635	1421	Ireland	45	319	Slieve Meelbeg	702	184	2,303	604	43B	29	J300279	Ma,Sim,Hew,Dil,A,VL
636	786	Scotland	527	515	Meall Garbh	701	257	2,300	843	03C	50	NN167367	Ma,G,Sim
637	519	Scotland	528	355	Carn a' Choin Deirg	701	319	2,300	1,047	15A	20	NH397923	Ma,G,Sim
638	1846	Scotland	529	1129	Sgurr nan Cnamh	701	157	2,300	515	18B	40	NM886643	Ma,G,Sim
639	923	Scotland	530	600	Blackcraig Hill	701	236	2,300	774	27C	71 77	NS647064	Ma,G,Sim,D,CoU
640	109	Ireland	46	20	Ben Gorm	700	612	2,297	2,008	47A	37	L861652	Ma,Sim,Hew,Dil,A,VL
641	728	Scotland	531	487	Slat Bheinn	700	267	2,297	876	10B	33	NG910027	Ma,G,Sim
642	941	Scotland	532	610	Meall Fuar-mhonaidh	699	234	2,293	768	11B	26	NH457222	Ma,G,Sim
643	129	Ireland	47	27	Birreencorragh	698	583	2,290	1,913	46B	23 31	G024050	Ma,Sim,Hew,Dil,A,VL
644	154	Scotland	533	106	Creach-Beinn	698	551	2,290	1,808	17E	49	NM642276	Ma,G,Sim
645	1122	Scotland	534	717	Windy Standard	698	212	2,290	696	27C	77	NS620014	Ma,G,Sim,D
646	876	Wales	33	51	Allt-Fawr	698	243	2,290	797	30B	115	SH681474	Ma,Sim,Hew,N
647	244	Wales	34	13	Mynydd Mawr	698	463	2,290	1,519	30B	115	SH539546	Ma,Sim,Hew,N
648	1234	Scotland	535	779	Carn Loch nan Amhaichean	697	202	2,287	663	15B	20	NH411757	Ma,G,Sim
649	422	Scotland	536	292	Queensberry	697	363	2,287	1,191	27C	78	NX989997	Ma,G,Sim,D
650	1235	Ireland	48	280	Bencollaghduff	696	202	2,283	663	47B	37	L797529	Ma,Sim,Hew,Dil,A,VL
651	1806	Scotland	537	1106	Beinn na Muice	695	159	2,280	522	12A	25	NH218402	Ma,G,Sim
652	576	England	33	34	Pen-y-ghent	694	306	2,277	1,004	35B	98	SD838733	Ma,Sim,Hew,N
653	116	Ireland	49	23	Keeper Hill	694	607	2,277	1,991	53B	59	R823667	Ma,Sim,Hew,Dil,A,VL
654	336	Ireland	50	62	The Paps East	694	402	2,277	1,319	48C	79	W133855	Ma,Sim,Hew,Dil,A,VL
655	1323	England	34	95	Seatallan	692	193	2,270	633	34B	89	NY140084	Ma,Sim,Hew,N,W,B,Sy,Fel
656	381	Scotland	538	268	Beinn a' Mhuinidh	692	383	2,270	1,257	14A	19	NH032660	Ma,G,Sim
657	1395	Scotland	539	874	Mullwharchar	692	187	2,270	614	27B	77	NX454866	Ma,G,Sim,D
658	429	Scotland	540	296	Ettrick Pen	692	358	2,270	1,175	28B	79	NT199076	Ma,G,Sim,D
659	439	Scotland	541	304	Beinn Tharsuinn	692	353	2,270	1,158	15B	21	NH606792	Ma,G,Sim
660	942	Ireland	51	204	Binn Bhraoin	691	234	2,267	768	47B	37	L783515	Ma,Sim,Hew,Dil,A,VL
661	1596	Scotland	542	987	Meall Dearg	690	172	2,265	565	01A	52	NN886414	Ma,G,Sim
662	140	Ireland	52	31	Knocknadobar	690	565	2,264	1,854	50A	83	V506845	Ma,Sim,Hew,Dil,A,VL
663	1970	Scotland	543	1203	Beinn Molurgainn	690	151	2,264	495	03B	50	NN019400	Ma,G,Sim
664	1212	Scotland	544	765	Ballencleuch Law	689	204	2,260	669	27C	78	NS935049	Ma,G,Sim,D
665	623	Wales	35	36	Arenig Fach	689	294	2,260	965	30D	124 125	SH820415	Ma,Sim,Hew,N
666	1945	Scotland	545	1192	Beinn Direach	689	152	2,260	499	16B	16	NC406380	Ma,G,Sim
667	67	Ireland	53	10	Croaghaun	688	688	2,257	2,257	46C	22 30	F559060	Ma,Sim,Hew,Dil,A,VL
668	877	Scotland	546	575	Stob Breac	688	243	2,257	797	01C	57	NN447166	Ma,G,Sim
669	1150	Scotland	547	735	Gathersnow Hill	688	210	2,257	689	28B	72	NT058256	Ma,G,Sim,D
670	1043	England	35	74	Great Coum	687	221	2,254	725	35B	98	SD700835	Ma,Sim,Hew,N
671	341	Ireland	54	64	Hungry Hill	685	400	2,247	1,312	51A	84	V760497	Ma,Sim,Hew,Dil,A,VL
672	1666	Ireland	55	383	Knockmoyle	684	168	2,244	551	50B	78 83	V665749	Ma,Sim,Hew,Dil,A,VL
673	1053	Scotland	548	677	Beinn Damhain	684	220	2,244	722	01D	50 56	NN282172	Ma,G,Sim
674	1650	Scotland	549	1013	Cruach an t-Sidhein	684	169	2,244	554	01E	56	NS275964	Ma,G,Sim
675	1651	Scotland	550	1014	Leana Mhor	684	169	2,244	554	09C	34 41	NN284878	Ma,G,Sim
676	114	Ireland	56	22	Maumtrasna	682	608	2,238	1,995	47C	38	L961637	Ma,Sim,Hew,Dil,A,VL
677	1585	Scotland	551	980	Beinn a' Chaisgein Beag	682	173	2,238	568	14A	19	NG966821	Ma,G,Sim
678	418	Ireland	57	82	Caherbarnagh	681	364	2,234	1,194	48C	79	W191871	Ma,Sim,Hew,Dil,A,VL
679	608	Scotland	552	412	Meall Onfhaidh	681	299	2,234	981	10D	41	NN010840	Ma,G,Sim
680	701	Scotland	553	467	Meall na Faochaig	681	273	2,234	896	12A	25	NH257525	Ma,G,Sim
681	172	Scotland	554	119	Beinn Bhreac	681	524	2,233	1,719	01E	56	NN321000	Ma,G,Sim
682	1422	Scotland	555	893	Meall a' Chrathaich	679	184	2,228	604	11B	26	NH360220	Ma,G,Sim
683	1527	Scotland	556	949	Carn na Breabaig	679	177	2,228	581	12B	25	NH066301	Ma,G,Sim
684	127	Scotland	557	88	Tiorga Mor	679	588	2,228	1,929	24B	13 14	NB055115	Ma,G,Sim
685	523	Wales	36	29	Maesglase	679	318	2,226	1,044	30F	124 125	SH817150	Ma,Sim,Hew,N
686	742	England	36	45	Baugh Fell - Tarn Rigg Hill	678	265	2,224	869	35A	98	SD740916	Ma,Sim,Hew,N
687	134	Ireland	58	30	Sawel	678	580	2,224	1,903	44B	13	H617973	Ma,Sim,Hew,Dil,A,VL,CoH,CoU
688	342	Ireland	59	65	Slieve Snaght	678	400	2,224	1,312	45B	01	B923148	Ma,Sim,Hew,Dil,A,VL
689	554	Scotland	558	381	Hill of Wirren	678	311	2,224	1,020	07B	44	NO522739	Ma,G,Sim
690	1542	Scotland	559	958	Carn Mhic an Toisich	678	176	2,224	577	11B	34	NH310185	Ma,G,Sim
691	356	Scotland	560	252	Carn Breac	678	392	2,224	1,286	13B	25	NH045530	Ma,G,Sim
692	1807	Scotland	561	1107	Capel Fell	678	159	2,224	522	28B	79	NT163069	Ma,G,Sim,D
693	765	Wales	37	44	Creigiau Gleision	678	262	2,224	860	30B	115	SH728615	Ma,Sim,Hew,N
694	1306	Scotland	562	825	Andrewhinney Hill	677	194	2,222	636	28B	79	NT197138	Ma,G,Sim,D
695	1307	Scotland	563	826	Carn Gorm	677	194	2,222	636	12B	26	NH328355	Ma,G,Sim
696	382	England	37	19	The Calf	676	383	2,218	1,257	35A	98	SD667970	Ma,Sim,Hew,N
697	587	Scotland	564	401	Meall Mor	676	304	2,218	997	03B	41	NN106559	Ma,G,Sim
698	670	Scotland	565	446	Beinn Suidhe	676	280	2,218	919	03C	50	NN211400	Ma,G,Sim
699	1833	Scotland	566	1123	Leana Mhor	676	158	2,218	518	09C	34 41	NN316879	Ma,G,Sim
700	636	Ireland	60	135	An Bheann Mhor	675	290	2,214	951	50B	83 84	V593683	Ma,Sim,Hew,Dil,A,VL
701	176	Ireland	61	36	Croaghgorm	674	522	2,211	1,713	45C	11	G948895	Ma,Sim,Hew,Dil,A,VL
702	1543	Wales	38	113	Moel Cynghorion	674	176	2,211	577	30B	115	SH586563	Ma,Sim,Hew,N
703	1067	Scotland	567	686	Creag Each	674	218	2,210	715	01A	51	NN652263	Ma,G,Sim
704	743	Scotland	568	492	Carn na Coinnich	673	265	2,209	869	12A	26	NH324510	Ma,G,Sim
705	1297	England	38	92	Rogan's Seat	672	195	2,205	640	35A	91 92	NY919030	Ma,Sim,Hew,N
706	808	England	39	50	Great Knoutberry Hill	672	254	2,205	833	35B	98	SD788871	Ma,Sim,Hew,N
707	1324	Ireland	62	297	Lavagh More	671	193	2,201	633	45C	11	G935910	Ma,Sim,Hew,Dil,A,VL
708	131	Ireland	63	28	Slievemore	671	582	2,201	1,909	46C	22 30	F650086	Ma,Sim,Hew,Dil,A,VL
709	615	Scotland	569	415	Cat Law	671	296	2,201	971	07A	44	NO318610	Ma,G,Sim
710	1251	Scotland	570	793	An Ruadh-mheallan	671	200	2,201	656	13A	19 24	NG836614	Ma,G,Sim
711	1702	Wales	39	127	Esgeiriau Gwynion	671	166	2,201	545	30E	124 125	SH889236	Ma,Sim,Hew,N
712	1869	Ireland	64	421	Slieve Muck	670	156	2,199	512	43B	29	J281249	Ma,Sim,Hew,Dil,A,VL
713	702	Ireland	65	153	Slievanea NE Top	670	273	2,198	896	49B	70	Q515063	Ma,Sim,Hew,Dil,A,VL
714	1473	Scotland	571	922	Hartaval	669	180	2,195	591	17A	23	NG480551	Ma,G,Sim
715	531	Wales	40	30	Carnedd y Filiast	669	316	2,195	1,037	30D	124 125	SH871445	Ma,Sim,Hew,N
716	953	England	40	68	Dodd Fell Hill	668	232	2,192	761	35B	98	SD841845	Ma,Sim,Hew,N
717	878	England	41	58	Fountains Fell	668	243	2,192	797	35B	98	SD864715	Ma,Sim,Hew,N
718	1947	Ireland	66	427	Knocknafallia	668	152	2,192	499	54A	74	S090075	Ma,Sim,Hew,A,VL
719	1808	Scotland	572	1108	Creag Bhalg	668	159	2,192	522	08B	43	NO091912	Ma,G,Sim
720	1289	Scotland	573	815	Beinn Bheag	668	196	2,192	643	14B	19	NH085714	Ma,G,Sim
721	221	Ireland	67	45	Muckish	667	481	2,189	1,578	45B	02	C004287	Ma,Sim,Hew,Dil,A,VL
722	663	Scotland	574	440	Binnein Shios	667	282	2,189	925	04B	34 42	NN492857	Ma,G,Sim
723	513	Ireland	68	103	Binn Bhriocain	667	320	2,188	1,050	47C	37	L855551	Ma,Sim,Hew,Dil,A,VL
724	1599	Scotland	575	990	Meall nan Eun	667	172	2,188	564	10B	33	NG903052	Ma,G,Sim
725	1834	Scotland	576	1124	Beinn Bhreac	667	158	2,188	518	15A	20	NH225886	Ma,G,Sim
726	1487	Wales	41	108	Foel Cedig	667	180	2,188	587	30E	125	SH988279	Ma,Sim,Hew,N
727	245	Wales	42	14	Tarren y Gesail	667	463	2,188	1,519	30F	124	SH710058	Ma,Sim,Hew,N
728	117	Ireland	69	24	Cuilcagh	666	605	2,185	1,985	45D	26	H123280	Ma,Sim,Hew,Dil,A,VL,CoH,CoU
729	512	Scotland	577	352	Beinn Gaire	666	321	2,185	1,053	18A	40	NM781748	Ma,G,Sim
730	504	Scotland	578	346	Uamh Bheag	666	325	2,184	1,066	26B	57	NN691118	Ma,G,Sim,D
731	787	Scotland	579	516	Meall Tairbh	665	257	2,182	843	03C	50	NN250375	Ma,G,Sim
732	1068	Scotland	580	687	Beinn Mheadhoin	665	218	2,182	715	12A	25	NH258477	Ma,G,Sim
733	1785	England	42	148	Tarn Crag (Sleddale)	664	160	2,178	525	34C	90	NY488078	Ma,Sim,Hew,N,W,B,Sy,Fel
734	1308	Ireland	70	294	Binn Gabhar	664	194	2,178	636	47B	37	L783506	Ma,Sim,Hew,Dil,A,VL
735	1162	Ireland	71	259	Croaghanmoira	664	209	2,178	686	55A	62	T099865	Ma,Sim,Hew,Dil,A,VL
736	195	Scotland	581	135	Beinn Ruadh	664	501	2,178	1,644	19C	56	NS155884	Ma,G,Sim
737	643	Scotland	582	429	Sgorr a' Choise	663	288	2,175	945	03B	41	NN084551	Ma,G,Sim
738	532	Scotland	583	365	Aodann Chleireig	663	316	2,175	1,037	10D	40	NM994825	Ma,G,Sim
739	999	Scotland	584	647	Croit Bheinn	663	227	2,175	745	18A	40	NM810773	Ma,G,Sim
740	1572	Wales	43	116	Fan Nedd	663	174	2,175	571	32A	160	SN913184	Ma,Sim,Hew,N
741	1847	England	43	158	Nine Standards Rigg	662	157	2,172	515	35A	91 92	NY825060	Ma,Sim,Hew,N
742	310	Scotland	585	222	Oireabhal	662	419	2,172	1,375	24B	13 14	NB083099	Ma,G,Sim
743	324	Ireland	72	60	Binn Mhor	661	408	2,169	1,339	47C	44	L918493	Ma,Sim,Hew,Dil,A,VL
744	734	Wales	44	41	Manod Mawr	661	266	2,169	873	30D	124	SH724446	Ma,Sim,Hew,N
745	392	Wales	45	23	Great Rhos	660	379	2,165	1,243	31B	148	SO182638	Ma,Sim,Hew,N,CoH
746	254	Scotland	586	180	Windlestraw Law	659	461	2,163	1,512	28A	73	NT371430	Ma,G,Sim,D
747	826	Scotland	587	544	Carn Glas-choire	659	251	2,162	823	09A	35 36	NH891291	Ma,G,Sim,CoH
748	493	Ireland	73	99	Knockowen	658	330	2,159	1,083	51A	84	V808553	Ma,Sim,Hew,Dil,A,VL
749	628	Scotland	588	421	Creag Mhor	658	293	2,159	961	01C	57	NN510185	Ma,G,Sim
750	1703	Scotland	589	1044	Meall nan Eagan	658	166	2,159	545	04B	42	NN596874	Ma,G,Sim
751	1279	Scotland	590	807	Creag Ruadh	658	197	2,159	646	05B	42	NN685882	Ma,G,Sim
752	486	Scotland	591	332	Creag Dhubh	658	332	2,159	1,089	09C	34 41	NN322824	Ma,G,Sim
753	766	England	44	46	Place Fell	657	262	2,156	860	34C	90	NY405169	Ma,Sim,Hew,N,W,B,Sy,Fel
754	292	Scotland	592	212	Mid Hill	657	430	2,156	1,411	01E	56	NS321962	Ma,G,Sim
755	832	Scotland	593	548	Millfore	657	250	2,156	820	27B	77	NX478754	Ma,G,Sim,D
756	369	Ireland	74	70	Crohane	656	388	2,152	1,273	52A	79	W049829	Ma,Sim,Hew,Dil,A,VL
757	1437	Scotland	594	899	Meall Odhar	656	183	2,152	600	01D	50	NN297298	Ma,G,Sim
758	1114	Scotland	595	714	Meall Blair	656	213	2,152	699	10C	33	NN077950	Ma,G,Sim
759	691	England	45	40	Harter Fell (Eskdale)	654	276	2,146	906	34D	96	SD218997	Ma,Sim,Hew,N,W,B,Sy,Fel
760	1488	Ireland	75	337	Muckanaght	654	179	2,146	587	47B	37	L767540	Ma,Sim,Hew,Dil,A,VL
761	476	Ireland	76	96	Keadeen Mountain	653	335	2,142	1,099	55A	62	S953897	Ma,Sim,Hew,Dil,A,VL
762	1461	Scotland	596	913	Fiarach	652	181	2,140	594	01D	50	NN344261	Ma,G,Sim
763	533	Ireland	77	108	Knockshanahullion	652	316	2,139	1,037	54A	74	R999104	Ma,Sim,Hew,Dil,A,VL
764	1325	Scotland	597	837	Beinn na Cille	652	193	2,139	633	18C	49	NM853542	Ma,G,Sim
765	520	Ireland	78	107	Dooish	652	319	2,137	1,047	45B	06	B982210	Ma,Sim,Hew,Dil,A,VL
766	396	Scotland	598	275	Beinn Donachain	651	376	2,137	1,234	03C	50	NN198316	Ma,G,Sim
767	1870	Scotland	599	1141	Glas-bheinn Mhor	651	156	2,136	512	11B	26	NH436231	Ma,G,Sim
768	664	Scotland	600	441	Blackhope Scar	651	282	2,136	925	28A	73	NT315483	Ma,G,Sim,D,CoH,CoU,CoA
769	1667	Scotland	601	1026	Sgorr Mhic Eacharna	650	168	2,133	551	18B	40	NM928630	Ma,G,Sim
770	752	Ireland	79	166	Mullaghanish	649	264	2,129	866	48C	79	W214817	Ma,Sim,Hew,Dil,A,VL
771	144	Ireland	80	32	Truskmore	647	560	2,123	1,837	45D	16	G759473	Ma,Sim,Hew,Dil,A,VL,CoH,CoU
772	943	Scotland	602	611	Carn Salachaidh	647	234	2,123	768	15B	20	NH518874	Ma,G,Sim
773	1309	Scotland	603	827	Beinn na Cloiche	646	194	2,119	636	04A	41	NN284648	Ma,G,Sim
774	1905	Scotland	604	1168	Biod an Fhithich	646	154	2,119	506	10A	33	NG950147	Ma,G,Sim
775	671	Ireland	81	146	Devilsmother	645	280	2,116	919	47C	37	L915624	Ma,Sim,Hew,Dil,A,VL
776	1971	Scotland	605	1204	Craignaw	645	151	2,116	495	27B	77	NX459833	Ma,G,Sim,D
777	788	Wales	46	47	Drygarn Fawr	645	257	2,116	843	31C	147	SN862584	Ma,Sim,Hew,N
778	593	Scotland	606	405	Sgiath a' Chaise	644	303	2,114	994	01B	57	NN583169	Ma,G,Sim
779	1171	Ireland	82	263	Coomnadiha	644	208	2,113	682	51A	85	V847600	Ma,Sim,Hew,Dil,A,VL
780	346	Scotland	607	245	Creag Tharsuinn	643	395	2,110	1,296	19C	56	NS087913	Ma,G,Sim
781	282	Ireland	83	54	Musheramore	643	437	2,109	1,434	48C	79	W328849	Ma,Sim,Hew,Dil,A,VL
782	982	Scotland	608	637	Beinn Clachach	642	228	2,107	749	10A	33	NG885109	Ma,G,Sim
783	1544	Ireland	84	350	Cush	641	176	2,104	577	53A	74	R894262	Ma,Sim,Hew,Dil,A,VL
784	1505	Ireland	85	340	Cnoc na Banoige	641	178	2,103	584	49B	70	Q548048	Ma,Sim,Hew,Dil,A,VL
785	393	Ireland	86	75	Knocklomena	641	379	2,103	1,243	50B	78	V797765	Ma,Sim,Hew,Dil,A,VL
786	954	Ireland	87	207	Scarr	641	232	2,103	761	55B	56	O132018	Ma,Sim,Hew,Dil,A,VL
787	744	Scotland	609	493	Blath Bhalg	641	265	2,103	869	06B	43	NO019611	Ma,G,Sim
788	501	Scotland	610	343	Mor Bheinn	640	327	2,101	1,073	01B	51 52 57	NN716211	Ma,G,Sim
789	1172	England	46	85	Yarlside	639	208	2,096	682	35A	98	SD685985	Ma,Sim,Hew,N
790	494	Ireland	88	100	Cnoc na gCapall	639	330	2,096	1,083	50B	78	V834767	Ma,Sim,Hew,Dil,A,VL
791	753	Ireland	89	167	Eagle Mountain	638	264	2,093	866	43B	29	J244229	Ma,Sim,Hew,Dil,A,VL
792	1983	Scotland	611	1209	Creag Gharbh	637	151	2,091	495	01A	51	NN632327	Ma,G,Sim
793	1474	Ireland	90	332	Knocknamanagh	637	180	2,090	591	52A	85	V990661	Ma,Sim,Hew,Dil,A,VL
794	1310	Scotland	612	828	Croft Head	637	194	2,090	636	28B	79	NT153056	Ma,G,Sim,D
795	1151	Scotland	613	736	Beinn Bhalgairean	637	210	2,089	689	01D	50	NN202241	Ma,G,Sim
796	198	England	47	8	Kinder Scout	636	497	2,088	1,629	36	110	SK084875	Ma,Sim,Hew,N,CoH,CoU,CoA
797	1044	Scotland	614	671	Beinn na Sroine	636	221	2,087	725	03C	50	NN233289	Ma,G,Sim
798	1972	Scotland	615	1205	Glas Bheinn	636	151	2,087	495	18B	40	NM939757	Ma,G,Sim
799	1236	Ireland	91	281	Mullaghclogha	635	202	2,083	663	44B	13	H557957	Ma,Sim,Hew,Dil,A,VL
800	338	Scotland	616	241	Beinn Ghobhlach	635	401	2,083	1,316	14A	19	NH055943	Ma,G,Sim
801	1226	Wales	47	87	Tarrenhendre	634	203	2,080	666	30F	135	SH682041	Ma,Sim,Hew,N
802	498	Scotland	617	340	Glas-charn	633	328	2,077	1,076	10D	40	NM846837	Ma,G,Sim
803	1886	Ireland	92	422	An Chailleach	632	155	2,073	509	47B	37	L755537	Ma,Sim,Hew,Dil,A,VL
804	1528	Scotland	618	950	Cruinn a' Bheinn	632	177	2,073	581	01C	56	NN365051	Ma,G,Sim
805	703	Scotland	619	468	Tullich Hill	632	273	2,073	896	01E	56	NN293006	Ma,G,Sim
806	1848	Scotland	620	1130	Meall a' Chaorainn	632	157	2,073	515	15A	20	NH360827	Ma,G,Sim
807	535	Wales	48	31	Y Garn	629	315	2,064	1,033	30D	124	SH702230	Ma,Sim,Hew,N
808	313	Scotland	621	225	Beinn Dhorain	628	416	2,060	1,365	16D	17	NC925156	Ma,G,Sim
809	597	Ireland	93	120	Mullaghaneany	627	302	2,057	991	44B	13	H685986	Ma,Sim,Hew,Dil,A,VL,CoU
810	419	Ireland	94	83	Nephin Beg	627	364	2,057	1,194	46B	23	F931102	Ma,Sim,Hew,Dil,A,VL
811	995	Scotland	622	643	Beinn na Feusaige	627	228	2,056	748	13B	25	NH090542	Ma,G,Sim
812	405	Scotland	623	281	Beinn a' Chlachain	626	373	2,054	1,224	13B	24	NG724490	Ma,G,Sim
813	490	Scotland	624	334	Scaraben	626	331	2,054	1,086	16C	17	ND066268	Ma,G,Sim
814	509	Scotland	625	350	Meall nan Caorach	624	322	2,046	1,056	01A	52	NN928338	Ma,G,Sim
815	1098	Ireland	95	240	An Scraig	623	215	2,044	705	49A	70	Q460057	Ma,Sim,Hew,Dil,A,VL
816	1475	Wales	49	105	Moel Ysgyfarnogod	623	180	2,044	591	30D	124	SH658345	Ma,Sim,Hew,N
817	563	Scotland	626	384	Creag Ruadh	622	309	2,041	1,014	09C	35	NN558913	Ma,G,Sim
818	1668	England	48	133	Cold Fell	621	168	2,037	551	35A	86	NY605556	Ma,Sim,Hew,N
819	164	England	49	6	High Willhays	621	537	2,037	1,762	40	191	SX580892	Ma,Sim,Hew,N,CoH,CoU,CoA
820	1016	Ireland	96	220	Maulin	621	225	2,037	738	51A	84	V712505	Ma,Sim,Hew,Dil,A,VL
821	103	Isle of Man	1	1	Snaefell; Highest in the Isle of Man	621	621	2,037	2,037	29	95	SC397880	Ma,Sim,CoH,CoU,CoA
822	1123	Scotland	627	718	Creag Ghuanach	621	212	2,037	696	04A	41	NN299690	Ma,G,Sim
823	1887	Scotland	628	1155	Tom Meadhoin	621	155	2,037	509	04A	41	NN087621	Ma,G,Sim
824	104	Scotland	629	74	Beinn Mhor	620	620	2,034	2,034	24C	22	NF808310	Ma,G,Sim,SIB
825	433	Scotland	630	299	Beinn an Eoin	619	355	2,031	1,165	16F	15	NC104064	Ma,G,Sim
826	809	Scotland	631	532	Pressendye	619	254	2,031	833	21B	37	NJ490089	Ma,G,Sim
827	791	Scotland	632	518	Cauldcleuch Head	619	256	2,031	840	28B	79	NT456006	Ma,G,Sim,D
828	1476	Wales	50	106	Cefn yr Ystrad	619	180	2,031	591	32A	160	SO087136	Ma,Sim,Hew,N
829	427	Ireland	97	84	Leenaun Hill	618	359	2,028	1,178	47C	37	L874593	Ma,Sim,Hew,Dil,A,VL
830	1311	Scotland	633	829	Cruach Choireadail	618	194	2,028	636	17E	48	NM594304	Ma,G,Sim
831	601	Scotland	634	411	Beinn Bheag	618	300	2,028	984	19C	56	NS125931	Ma,G,Sim
832	1910	Scotland	635	1171	Meall Reamhar	618	154	2,027	505	01A	52	NN922332	Ma,G,Sim
833	1586	Scotland	636	981	Carn na h-Easgainn	617	173	2,024	568	09B	27	NH743320	Ma,G,Sim
834	265	Scotland	637	189	Beinn na Gucaig	616	451	2,021	1,480	04A	41	NN062653	Ma,G,Sim
835	119	Ireland	98	25	Slieve Snaght	615	600	2,018	1,969	45A	03	C424390	Ma,Sim,Hew,Dil,A,VL
836	482	Scotland	638	328	Carn nan Tri-tighearnan	615	333	2,018	1,093	09A	27	NH823390	Ma,G,Sim
837	866	Scotland	639	568	Beinn a' Mheadhoin	613	245	2,011	804	11A	25	NH218255	Ma,G,Sim
838	1715	Scotland	640	1053	Meall an Fheur Loch	613	165	2,011	541	16E	16	NC361310	Ma,G,Sim
839	1871	Scotland	641	1142	Creag a' Mhadaidh	612	156	2,008	512	05A	42	NN634650	Ma,G,Sim
840	279	Scotland	642	202	Stac Pollaidh	612	441	2,008	1,447	16F	15	NC107106	Ma,G,Sim
841	215	Scotland	643	152	Cruach nan Capull	612	486	2,008	1,594	19C	63	NS095795	Ma,G,Sim
842	665	Scotland	644	442	Cruach nam Mult	611	282	2,005	925	19C	56	NN168056	Ma,G,Sim
843	1669	Scotland	645	1027	Creag Dhubh Mhor	611	168	2,005	551	12A	25	NG982404	Ma,G,Sim
844	698	Wales	51	40	Foel Goch	611	274	2,005	899	30D	125	SH953422	Ma,Sim,Hew,N
845	1312	Wales	52	93	Pen y Garn	611	194	2,005	636	31C	135 147	SN798771	Ma,Sim,Hew,N
846	1835	England	50	154	Birks Fell	610	158	2,001	518	35B	98	SD918763	Ma,Sim,Hew,N
847	1361	Wales	53	97	Tal y Fan	610	190	2,001	622	30B	115	SH729726	Ma,Sim,Hew,N
848	543	England	51	31	Calf Top	610	313	2,000	1,027	35B	98	SD664856	Ma,Sim,Hew,N
849	1940	Scotland	646	1189	Corwharn	609	153	1,998	500	07A	44	NO288651	Ma,Sim,HF,xG
850	1248	Scotland	647	790	Ladylea Hill	609	201	1,998	659	21A	37	NJ343168	Ma,Sim,HF,xG
851	536	England	52	29	Illgill Head	609	314	1,998	1,030	34B	89	NY168049	Ma,Sim,Dew,W,B,Sy,Fel
852	1031	Ireland	99	227	Corcog	609	223	1,998	732	47C	45	L952491	Ma,Sim,Dil,A,VL,MDew
853	497	Scotland	648	339	Ben Aslak	609	329	1,998	1,079	17C	33	NG750191	Ma,Sim,HF,xG
854	650	Wales	54	37	Mynydd Troed	609	286	1,998	938	32A	161	SO165292	Ma,Sim,Dew
855	924	Scotland	649	601	Burach	607	236	1,991	774	10C	34	NH383141	Ma,Sim,HF
856	616	Scotland	650	416	Cruach Neuran	607	296	1,991	971	19C	56	NS083820	Ma,Sim,HF
857	1189	Scotland	651	755	Cruach nam Miseag	607	206	1,991	676	19C	56	NS182981	Ma,Sim,HF
858	178	Ireland	100	37	Croghan Kinsella	606	520	1,988	1,706	55A	62	T130728	Ma,Sim,A,VL,MDew
859	565	Scotland	652	386	Hecla	606	308	1,988	1,010	24C	22	NF825344	Ma,Sim,HF
860	1252	Scotland	653	794	Well Hill	606	200	1,988	656	27C	71 78	NS913064	Ma,Sim,DDew
861	901	Ireland	101	196	Carran	604	240	1,982	787	52A	85	W052678	Ma,Sim,A,VL,MDew
862	633	Ireland	102	134	Lackabane	603	291	1,978	955	51A	84	V751536	Ma,Sim,A,VL,MDew
863	800	Scotland	654	527	Beinn a' Chuirn	603	255	1,978	837	10A	33	NG870220	Ma,Sim,HF
864	1280	England	53	89	Peel Fell	603	197	1,977	646	33	80	NY625997	Ma,Sim,Dew
865	414	Ireland	103	81	Aghla Beg South Top	602	366	1,976	1,201	45B	02	B965246	Ma,Sim,A,VL,MDew
866	294	Scotland	655	214	Sgorach Mor	602	429	1,976	1,407	19C	56	NS096849	Ma,Sim,HF
867	1099	Scotland	656	706	Leagag	601	215	1,972	705	02A	42 51	NN518539	Ma,Sim,HF
868	925	Scotland	657	602	The Coyles of Muick	601	236	1,972	774	07A	44	NO328910	Ma,Sim,HF
869	506	Scotland	658	347	Sithean Mor	601	323	1,972	1,060	10D	40	NM729866	Ma,Sim,HF
870	424	England	54	23	Black Combe	600	362	1,969	1,188	34D	96	SD135854	Ma,Sim,Dew,WO,B,Sy,Fel
871	1973	Ireland	104	438	Silver Hill	600	151	1,969	495	45C	11	G906913	Ma,Sim,A,VL,MDew
872	357	Wales	55	19	Craig y Llyn	600	392	1,969	1,286	32C	170	SN906031	Ma,Sim,Dew,CoH,CoU,CoA
873	1888	Ireland	105	423	Sorrel Hill	600 (Note: Sorrel Hill height is 599.5 m, and thus below the 600.0 m threshold for a Simm)	155	1,967	509	55B	56	O042118	Ma,A,MDew
874	1743	Scotland	659	1068	Greatmoor Hill	599	163	1,965	535	28B	79	NT489006	Ma,5,DDew
875	1529	Scotland	660	951	Meallan Odhar Doire nan Gillean	599	177	1,964	581	12B	25	NH156377	Ma,5,HF
876	165	Ireland	106	35	Garraun	598	536	1,962	1,759	47A	37	L767610	Ma,A,MDew
877	879	Scotland	661	576	Colt Hill	598	243	1,962	797	27C	77	NX698990	Ma,5,DDew
878	1102	Ireland	107	241	Annacoona Top	597	214	1,959	702	45D	16	G728463	Ma,A,MDew
879	1124	Scotland	662	719	Beinn Uird	597	212	1,959	696	01C	56	NS399985	Ma,5,HF
880	745	Scotland	663	494	Beinn Uamha	597	265	1,958	869	01C	56	NN386069	Ma,5,HF
881	233	Ireland	108	48	Slieve League	596	470	1,957	1,542	45C	10	G543783	Ma,A,MDew
882	319	Wales	56	17	Sugar Loaf	596	411	1,955	1,348	32A	161	SO272187	Ma,5,Dew
883	769	Scotland	664	504	Wisp Hill	595	261	1,952	856	28B	79	NY386993	Ma,5,DDew
884	1836	Scotland	665	1125	Ward Law	594	158	1,949	518	28B	79	NT262159	Ma,5,DDew
885	1670	Wales	57	124	Llan Ddu Fawr	594	168	1,949	551	31C	135 147	SN790704	Ma,5,Dew
886	363	Ireland	109	69	Aghla Mountain	593	390	1,946	1,280	45C	11	G896988	Ma,A,MDew
887	514	Scotland	666	353	Cairn Table	593	320	1,946	1,050	27C	71	NS724242	Ma,5,DDew
888	818	Scotland	667	538	Beinn Mhealaich	592	252	1,942	827	16D	17	NC960149	Ma,5,HF
889	902	Scotland	668	589	Beinn Dubh an Iaruinn	591	240	1,939	787	12B	25	NH182392	Ma,5,HF
890	1403	Scotland	669	881	Beinn a' Ghraig	591	186	1,939	610	17E	47 48	NM541372	Ma,5,HF
891	1088	Scotland	670	698	Cruban Beag	590	216	1,936	709	04B	35	NN668924	Ma,5,HF
892	289	Scotland	671	209	Ben Griam Mor	590	433	1,936	1,421	16C	17	NC806389	Ma,5,HF
893	191	Ireland	110	40	Slieve Foye	589	507	1,932	1,663	56A	29 36	J168120	Ma,A,MDew,CoH,CoU
894	1326	Scotland	672	838	Beinn Mheadhonach	589	193	1,932	633	03B	50	NN064434	Ma,5,HF
895	383	Scotland	673	269	Cruach Mhor	589	383	1,932	1,257	19A	50 56	NN057147	Ma,5,HF
896	1633	Scotland	674	1006	The Wiss	589	170	1,932	558	28B	73	NT264206	Ma,5,DDew
897	1756	Wales	58	135	Moelfre	589	162	1,932	531	30D	124	SH626245	Ma,5,Dew
898	303	Ireland	111	57	Buckoogh	588	425	1,929	1,394	46B	31	F995017	Ma,A,MDew
899	415	Scotland	675	288	Cnoc Damh	588	366	1,929	1,201	15A	20	NH270962	Ma,5,HF
900	1844	Scotland	676	1128	Green Hill	588	158	1,929	518	27C	71 78	NS862125	Ma,5,DDew
901	1924	Scotland	677	1180	Binnean nan Gobhar	586	153	1,923	502	01C	56	NS418967	Ma,5,HF
902	602	Wales	59	34	Pegwn Mawr	586	300	1,923	984	31B	136	SO023812	Ma,5,Dew
903	833	Ireland	112	184	Slieve Anierin	585	250	1,919	820	45D	26	H018159	Ma,A,MDew
904	1447	Scotland	678	907	Druim a' Chuirn	584	182	1,916	597	10D	40	NM827887	Ma,5,HF
905	1716	England	55	139	Black Hill	582	165	1,909	541	36	110	SE076045	Ma,5,Dew,CoH,CoU,CoA
906	767	Ireland	113	172	Benbrack	582	262	1,909	860	47B	37	L765558	Ma,A,MDew
907	1017	Ireland	114	221	Bengorm	582	225	1,909	738	46B	31	F928013	Ma,A,MDew
908	544	Scotland	679	372	Beinn nam Beathrach	582	313	1,909	1,027	18C	49	NM752572	Ma,5,HF
909	620	Scotland	680	418	Sgurr Marcasaidh	580	295	1,903	968	12A	26	NH354592	Ma,5,HF
910	880	Scotland	681	577	Beinn nam Ban	580	243	1,903	797	14A	19	NH108908	Ma,5,HF
911	477	Scotland	682	324	Ben Griam Beg	580	335	1,903	1,099	16C	10	NC831411	Ma,5,HF
912	1018	Scotland	683	658	Stulabhal	579	225	1,900	738	24B	13 14	NB133122	Ma,5,HF
913	550	Scotland	684	378	Scald Law	579	312	1,900	1,024	28A	65 66	NT191610	Ma,5,DDew
914	466	Scotland	685	320	Meall an Fhuarain	578	341	1,896	1,119	15A	15	NC280023	Ma,5,HF
915	189	Scotland	686	131	Earl's Seat	578	511	1,896	1,677	26A	57 64	NS569838	Ma,5,DDew,CoU
916	964	Wales	60	63	Coety Mountain	578	231	1,896	758	32C	161	SO231079	Ma,5,Dew,CoU
917	388	Wales	61	22	Moel y Gamelin	577	382	1,893	1,253	30C	116	SJ176465	Ma,5,Dew
918	260	Ireland	115	52	Slieve Gullion	576	454	1,890	1,490	43A	29 36	J024203	Ma,A,MDew,CoH
919	1396	Scotland	687	875	Druim Leathad nam Fias	576	187	1,890	614	18B	40	NM955702	Ma,5,HF
920	246	Ireland	116	49	Bunnacunneen	575	463	1,886	1,519	47C	38	L938577	Ma,A,MDew
921	1173	Scotland	688	746	Corra Bheinn	575	208	1,886	682	20A	61	NR526755	Ma,5,HF
922	1103	Scotland	689	709	Beinn Bhreac	575	214	1,886	702	20C	62 69	NR943455	Ma,5,HF
923	1268	Scotland	690	803	Beinn nan Cabar	574	198	1,883	650	10D	40	NM765865	Ma,5,HF
924	180	Scotland	691	124	Mealaisbhal	574	519	1,883	1,703	24A	13	NB022270	Ma,5,HF
925	1731	England	56	142	Blake Fell	573	164	1,880	538	34B	89	NY110196	Ma,5,Dew,W,B,Sy,Fel
926	1045	England	57	75	Whitfell	573	221	1,880	725	34D	96	SD158929	Ma,5,Dew,WO,B,Sy,Fel
927	646	Scotland	692	431	Beinn an t-Sidhein	572	287	1,877	942	01C	57	NN546178	Ma,5,HF
928	1397	Scotland	693	876	Dun Coillich	572	187	1,877	614	02A	42 51 52	NN762536	Ma,5,HF
929	378	Scotland	694	265	Beinn na Cro	572	384	1,877	1,260	17C	32	NG569241	Ma,5,HF
930	149	Scotland	695	101	Beinn Mhor	572	555	1,877	1,821	24A	13 14	NB254095	Ma,5,HF
931	746	Ireland	117	164	Croaghnageer	571	265	1,873	869	45C	11	H011886	Ma,A,MDew
932	1704	Scotland	696	1045	Creag na Doire Duibhe	571	166	1,873	545	04B	35	NN615905	Ma,5,HF
933	327	Scotland	697	233	Orval	571	406	1,873	1,332	17D	39	NM333991	Ma,5,HF
934	858	Scotland	698	565	Meikle Conval	571	246	1,873	807	21A	28	NJ291371	Ma,5,HF
935	450	Scotland	699	311	Broughton Heights	571	347	1,873	1,138	28A	72	NT122411	Ma,5,DDew
936	1555	Scotland	700	964	Meall nan Damh	570	175	1,870	574	20C	62 69	NR910469	Ma,5,HF
937	1313	Scotland	701	830	Carn Daimh	570	194	1,870	636	21A	36	NJ181249	Ma,5,HF
938	916	Scotland	702	597	Meikle Bin	570	237	1,870	778	26A	57 64	NS667821	Ma,5,DDew
939	1849	Scotland	703	1131	Beinn a' Chuirn	569	157	1,867	515	03C	50	NN217373	Ma,5,HF
940	1383	Scotland	704	866	Glas Bheinn Mhor	569	188	1,867	617	17B	32	NG553257	Ma,5,HF
941	213	Scotland	705	150	Criffel	569	487	1,867	1,598	27C	84	NX957618	Ma,5,DDew
942	1587	Scotland	706	982	Hods Hill	569	173	1,867	568	27C	78	NT000099	Ma,5,DDew
943	792	Scotland	707	519	Roan Fell	568	256	1,864	840	28B	79	NY451931	Ma,5,DDew
944	726	Scotland	708	485	Beinn a' Mhonicag	567	268	1,860	879	09C	34 41	NN287854	Ma,5,HF
945	1600	Scotland	709	991	Beinn Reidh	567	172	1,860	564	16F	15	NC211212	Ma,5,HF
946	1652	Scotland	710	1015	East Cairn Hill	567	169	1,860	554	28A	65 72	NT128593	Ma,5,DDew,CoU
947	1115	Scotland	711	715	Minch Moor	567	213	1,860	699	28B	73	NT358330	Ma,5,DDew
948	639	Ireland	118	137	Moanlaur	566	289	1,857	948	49B	71	Q689044	Ma,A,MDew
949	1032	Scotland	712	665	Meall Gainmheich	566	223	1,857	732	01C	57	NN509095	Ma,5,HF
950	1771	Scotland	713	1085	Doire Ban	566	161	1,857	528	04A	41	NN090643	Ma,5,HF
951	624	Ireland	119	130	Gaugin Mountain	565	294	1,854	965	45C	06 11	G983949	Ma,A,MDew
952	1477	Scotland	714	923	Ben Newe	565	180	1,854	591	21A	37	NJ381143	Ma,5,HF
953	1506	Scotland	715	939	Craigenreoch	565	178	1,854	584	27B	76	NX335910	Ma,5,DDew
954	1732	Wales	62	131	Cyrn-y-Brain	565	164	1,852	538	30C	117	SJ208488	Ma,5,Dew
955	1008	Scotland	716	654	Pikethaw Hill	564	226	1,850	741	28B	79	NY369977	Ma,5,DDew
956	347	England	58	17	Ward's Stone	563	395	1,847	1,296	36	102	SD591587	Ma,5,Dew
957	1163	Scotland	717	743	Creag nam Mial	563	209	1,847	686	06B	52 53	NO053541	Ma,5,HF
958	852	Scotland	718	560	Tap o' Noth	563	247	1,847	810	21A	37	NJ484293	Ma,5,HF
959	577	Ireland	120	113	Carnanelly	562	306	1,844	1,004	44B	13	H674921	Ma,A,MDew
960	160	Scotland	719	112	Stob Odhar	562	544	1,844	1,785	19B	62	NR818742	Ma,5,HF
961	678	Scotland	720	451	Gkas Bheinn	562	279	1,844	915	20A	61	NR500699	Ma,5,HF
962	1687	Scotland	721	1035	Beinn na Seamraig	561	167	1,841	548	17C	33	NG728177	Ma,5,HF
963	1384	Scotland	722	867	Coirc Bheinn	561	188	1,841	617	17E	48	NM487326	Ma,5,HF
964	295	Wales	63	15	Yr Eifl	561	429	1,840	1,407	30A	123	SH364447	Ma,5,Dew
965	1142	Scotland	723	729	Meall Alvie	560	211	1,837	692	08B	44	NO203919	Ma,5,HF
966	1772	Wales	64	137	Banc Llechwedd-mawr	560	161	1,837	528	31A	135	SN775898	Ma,5,Dew
967	926	England	59	65	Shining Tor	559	236	1,834	774	36	118	SJ994737	Ma,5,Dew,CoU,CoA
968	1948	Ireland	121	428	Slievemoughanmore	559	152	1,834	499	43B	29	J249240	Ma,A,MDew
969	827	Scotland	724	545	An Cabar	559	251	1,834	823	14B	20	NH257641	Ma,5,HF
970	1398	Scotland	725	877	Beinn Eilideach	559	187	1,834	614	15A	20	NH170926	Ma,5,HF
971	1213	Scotland	726	766	Meall a' Bhainne	559	204	1,834	669	18B	40	NM901785	Ma,5,HF
972	406	Scotland	727	282	Sgaoth Aird	559	373	1,834	1,224	24B	13 14	NB165039	Ma,5,HF
973	1227	Scotland	728	774	Cnoc nan Cuilean	558	203	1,831	666	16B	10	NC597461	Ma,5,HF
974	348	England	60	18	Pendle Hill	557	395	1,827	1,296	36	103	SD804414	Ma,5,Dew
975	1688	England	61	136	Aye Gill Pike	556	167	1,824	548	35B	98	SD720886	Ma,5,Dew
976	1949	Scotland	729	1194	Beinn Mheadhoin	556	152	1,824	499	09B	26 35	NH604214	Ma,5,HF
977	1994	Ireland	122	443	Mackoght	555	150	1,821	492	45B	01	B940214	Ma,A,MDew
978	839	Scotland	730	552	Beinn Duirinnis	555	249	1,821	817	03B	50	NN021347	Ma,5,HF
979	810	Scotland	731	533	Beinn a' Bhacaidh	555	254	1,821	833	09B	34	NH431119	Ma,5,HF
980	1253	Scotland	732	795	Creag Scalabsdale	555	200	1,821	656	16C	17	NC970240	Ma,5,HF
981	680	Wales	65	39	Moel Famau	555	278	1,820	912	30C	116	SJ161626	Ma,5,Dew,CoH,CoU
982	688	Ireland	123	151	Peakeen Mountain	555	277	1,820	909	52A	78	V903764	Ma,A,MDew
983	1478	England	62	114	Hoove	555	180	1,820	591	35A	92	NZ001069	Ma,5,Dew
984	1773	Scotland	733	1086	Cairnkinna Hill	554	161	1,818	528	27C	78	NS791018	Ma,5,DDew
985	1904	Scotland	734	1167	Crock	554	154	1,817	506	07A	44	NO226632	Ma,5,HF
986	1872	Scotland	735	1143	Creag Dhubh Mhor	553	156	1,814	512	16B	16	NC458336	Ma,5,HF
987	1717	Scotland	736	1054	Little Conval	553	165	1,814	541	21A	28	NJ294392	Ma,5,HF
988	1269	Wales	66	91	Moel-ddu	553	198	1,814	650	30B	124	SH579442	Ma,5,Dew
989	917	England	63	63	Lord's Seat	552	237	1,811	778	34A	89 90	NY204265	Ma,5,Dew,W,B,Sy,Fel
990	1190	Ireland	124	268	Dromavally Mountain	552	206	1,811	676	49B	71	Q605066	Ma,A,MDew
991	1076	Scotland	737	692	Ben Dearg	552	217	1,811	712	17A	23	NG478504	Ma,5,HF
992	1588	Scotland	738	983	Meall Mor	551	173	1,808	568	07A	43	NO173602	Ma,5,HF
993	173	Scotland	739	120	Sidhean na Raplaich	551	523	1,808	1,716	18C	49	NM636516	Ma,5,HF
994	1489	Scotland	740	926	Turner Cleuch Law	551	179	1,808	587	28B	73	NT287204	Ma,5,DDew
995	1850	Wales	67	139	Tor y Foel	551	157	1,808	515	32A	161	SO114194	Ma,5,Dew
996	927	Ireland	125	202	Mullaghmore	550	236	1,804	774	44B	08	C738008	Ma,A,MDew
997	188	Ireland	126	39	Trostan	550	512	1,804	1,680	43C	09	D179235	Ma,A,MDew,CoH
998	801	Scotland	741	528	Beinn Ghlas (Inveraray)	550	255	1,804	837	01D	50 56	NN131180	Ma,5,HF
999	1298	Wales	68	92	Drosgol	550	195	1,804	640	31A	135	SN759878	Ma,5,Dew
1000	1545	Wales	69	114	Mynydd Carn-y-cefn	550	176	1,804	577	32C	161	SO187084	Ma,5,Dew
1001	1911	England	64	165	Hard Knott	549	154	1,801	505	34B	89 90	NY231023	Ma,5,Dew,W,B,Sy,Fel
1002	955	Ireland	127	208	Eagles Hill	549	232	1,801	761	50B	83 84	V583631	Ma,A,MDew
1003	1438	Scotland	742	900	An Grianan	549	183	1,801	600	03B	50	NN075478	Ma,5,HF
1004	1546	Scotland	743	959	Beinn Churalain	549	176	1,801	577	03B	49	NM990461	Ma,5,HF
1005	956	Scotland	744	617	Carn na Loine	549	232	1,801	761	09A	27	NJ070360	Ma,5,HF
1006	819	Scotland	745	539	Meall Liath Choire	549	252	1,801	827	15A	20	NH226961	Ma,5,HF
1007	1733	Scotland	746	1063	Trahenna Hill	549	164	1,801	538	28A	72	NT135374	Ma,5,DDew
1008	1912	Scotland	747	1172	Scaw'd Fell	549	154	1,801	505	28B	78	NT149028	Ma,5,DDew
1009	1314	Scotland	748	831	Beinn Mhialairigh	548	194	1,798	636	10A	33	NG800128	Ma,5,HF
1010	234	Scotland	749	165	Carn a' Ghobhair	548	470	1,798	1,542	10D	33 40	NM716964	Ma,5,HF
1011	907	Ireland	128	198	Knocknacusha	547	239	1,795	784	50B	78 83	V675782	Ma,A,MDew
1012	1152	Scotland	750	737	Leathad Mor	547	210	1,795	689	03A	41	NN378510	Ma,5,HF
1013	1490	Wales	70	109	Beacon Hill	547	179	1,795	587	31B	136 148	SO176767	Ma,5,Dew
1014	468	Ireland	129	92	Shehy More	546	340	1,790	1,115	52B	85	W151600	Ma,A,MDew
1015	1705	Scotland	751	1046	Carn Garbh	545	166	1,788	545	16D	17	NC892137	Ma,5,HF
1016	1809	England	65	150	White Hill	544	159	1,785	522	36	103	SD673587	Ma,5,Dew
1017	224	Ireland	130	46	Knockalongy	544	480	1,785	1,575	45E	25	G504275	Ma,A,MDew
1018	1925	Scotland	752	1181	Meall Sguman	544	153	1,785	502	11A	25 33	NH022267	Ma,5,HF
1019	1744	Scotland	753	1069	Cnoc a' Bhaid-rallaich	544	163	1,785	535	14A	19	NH066930	Ma,5,HF
1020	713	Scotland	754	477	Beinn an Eoin	544	271	1,785	889	16E	16	NC389082	Ma,5,HF
1021	729	Ireland	131	158	Mauherslieve	543	267	1,781	876	53B	59	R873619	Ma,A,MDew
1022	1448	Ireland	132	328	The Playbank	543	182	1,781	597	45D	26	H032256	Ma,A,MDew
1023	672	Scotland	755	447	Meall na Suiramach	543	280	1,781	919	17A	23	NG446695	Ma,5,HF
1024	1889	Scotland	756	1156	Deuchar Law	543	155	1,781	509	28B	73	NT284297	Ma,5,DDew
1025	394	Ireland	133	76	Mullaghcarn	542	378	1,778	1,240	44B	13	H510809	Ma,A,MDew
1026	1745	Wales	71	134	Gwaunceste Hill	542	163	1,778	535	31B	148	SO158555	Ma,5,Dew
1027	193	Ireland	134	41	Corraun Hill East Top	541	504	1,775	1,654	46B	30	L777961	Ma,A,MDew
1028	407	England	66	21	Brown Clee Hill	540	373	1,772	1,224	38A	137 138	SO593867	Ma,5,Dew,CoH,CoU,CoA
1029	1019	Wales	72	66	Rhialgwm	540	225	1,772	738	30E	125	SJ055211	Ma,5,Dew
1030	617	Ireland	135	129	Moylenanav	539	296	1,768	971	45B	01	B955133	Ma,A,MDew
1031	1214	Scotland	757	767	Creag Dhubh	539	204	1,768	669	11B	25	NH225216	Ma,5,HF
1032	1671	Wales	73	125	Mynydd Nodol	539	168	1,768	551	30D	124 125	SH865393	Ma,5,Dew
1033	1270	England	67	88	Great Mell Fell	537	198	1,762	650	34C	90	NY396253	Ma,5,Dew,W,B,Sy,Fel
1034	957	Scotland	758	618	Creag Loch nan Dearcag	537	232	1,762	761	12A	26	NH333567	Ma,5,HF
1035	1353	Scotland	759	850	Penvalla	537	190	1,762	623	28A	72	NT150395	Ma,5,DDew
1036	1746	Scotland	760	1070	Ellson Fell	537	163	1,762	535	28B	79	NY410985	Ma,5,DDew
1037	430	England	68	24	Stiperstones	537	357	1,761	1,172	38A	137	SO367986	Ma,5,Dew
1038	1033	Ireland	136	228	Ballycurragh Hill	536	223	1,759	732	55A	62	T056823	Ma,A,MDew
1039	1689	Ireland	137	389	Two Rock Mountain	536	167	1,759	548	55B	50	O172223	Ma,A,MDew
1040	458	Wales	74	26	Foel Cwmcerwyn	536	344	1,759	1,129	31C	145	SN094311	Ma,5,Dew,CoH,CoU
1041	609	Ireland	138	126	Nowen Hill	535	299	1,756	981	52B	85	W140529	Ma,A,MDew
1042	611	Ireland	139	127	Torc Mountain	535	298	1,755	978	52A	78	V955839	Ma,A,MDew
1043	1153	Scotland	761	738	Ben Hiel	535	210	1,755	689	16B	10	NC595500	Ma,5,HF
1044	853	Scotland	762	561	Wether Hill	535	247	1,755	810	27C	77	NX696942	Ma,5,DDew
1045	730	Scotland	763	488	Meikle Says Law	535	267	1,755	876	28A	67	NT581617	Ma,5,DDew,CoH,CoU
1046	284	Ireland	140	55	Slieve Croob	534	436	1,752	1,430	43B	20	J318453	Ma,A,MDew
1047	1462	Scotland	764	914	Kerloch	534	181	1,752	594	07B	45	NO696878	Ma,5,HF
1048	334	Scotland	765	240	Ben Shieldaig	534	403	1,752	1,322	13B	24	NG833524	Ma,5,HF
1049	949	England	69	67	Titterstone Clee Hill	533	233	1,749	764	38A	137 138	SO591779	Ma,5,Dew
1050	970	Scotland	766	628	Ben Clach	533	230	1,749	755	26B	57	NN759152	Ma,5,DDew
1051	1195	Scotland	767	758	Coiliochbhar Hill	533	205	1,749	673	21B	37	NJ503163	Ma,5,HF
1052	760	Wales	75	42	Mwdwl-eithin	532	263	1,745	863	30C	116	SH917540	Ma,5,Dew
1053	216	Ireland	141	44	Moylussa	532	486	1,744	1,594	48A	58	R648759	Ma,A,MDew,CoH,CoU
1054	1281	Scotland	768	808	Craiglee	531	197	1,742	646	27B	77	NX461801	Ma,5,DDew
1055	537	Scotland	769	367	Bennachie - Oxen Craig	529	314	1,736	1,030	21B	38	NJ662226	Ma,5,HF
1056	384	Ireland	142	73	Seefin Mountain W Top	528	383	1,732	1,257	53A	73	R644180	Ma,A,MDew
1057	487	Ireland	143	97	Slieve Gallion	528	332	1,732	1,089	44B	13	H798878	Ma,A,MDew
1058	761	Scotland	770	502	Bidean Bad na h-Iolaire	528	263	1,732	863	04A	41	NN114708	Ma,5,HF
1059	247	Scotland	771	175	Ben Hiant	528	463	1,732	1,519	18A	47	NM537632	Ma,5,HF
1060	364	Scotland	772	256	Todun	528	390	1,732	1,280	24B	14	NB210029	Ma,5,HF
1061	308	Ireland	144	58	Arderin	527	420	1,729	1,378	56B	54	S232989	Ma,A,MDew,CoH,CoU
1062	366	Scotland	773	258	Beinn Stumanadh	527	389	1,729	1,276	16C	10	NC640499	Ma,5,HF
1063	983	Scotland	774	638	Beinn Choradail	527	228	1,729	748	24C	22	NF819328	Ma,5,HF
1064	1174	Ireland	145	264	Doughruagh	526	208	1,726	682	47A	37	L750594	Ma,A,MDew
1065	1786	Scotland	775	1094	Beinn Bhreac	526	160	1,726	525	19A	50 55	NN027102	Ma,5,HF
1066	299	Ireland	146	56	Arroo Mountain	523	426	1,716	1,398	45D	16	G832520	Ma,A,MDew
1067	715	Ireland	147	154	Croaghconnellagh	523	270	1,716	886	45C	11	H023863	Ma,A,MDew
1068	903	Scotland	776	590	Cnoc Ceislein	523	240	1,716	787	15B	21	NH589706	Ma,5,HF
1069	1254	Scotland	777	796	Craiglee	523	200	1,716	656	27B	77	NX470962	Ma,5,DDew
1070	918	Wales	76	55	Gyrn Moelfre	523	237	1,716	778	30E	125	SJ184293	Ma,5,Dew
1071	984	Wales	77	64	Carnedd Wen	523	228	1,716	748	31A	125	SH924099	Ma,5,Dew
1072	373	Wales	78	20	Gyrn Ddu	522	386	1,713	1,266	30A	115 123	SH401467	Ma,5,Dew
1073	1282	Scotland	778	809	Black Craig	522	197	1,713	646	19C	63	NS115760	Ma,5,HF
1074	329	Scotland	779	235	West Lomond	522	405	1,713	1,329	26A	58	NO197066	Ma,5,DDew,CoH,CoU,CoA
1075	211	Scotland	780	148	Hill of Stake	522	489	1,713	1,604	27A	63	NS273630	Ma,5,DDew,CoH,CoU
1076	716	Scotland	781	479	Nutberry Hill	522	270	1,713	886	27A	71	NS743338	Ma,5,DDew
1077	1009	England	70	70	Fair Snape Fell	521	226	1,709	741	36	102	SD597472	Ma,5,Dew
1078	1706	Ireland	148	392	Carnaween	521	166	1,709	545	45C	11	G876891	Ma,A,MDew
1079	1507	Scotland	782	940	Meall Glac Tigh-fail	521	178	1,709	584	14A	20	NH161827	Ma,5,HF
1080	425	Scotland	783	293	Farrmheall	521	362	1,709	1,188	16A	9	NC308587	Ma,5,HF
1081	499	Scotland	784	341	An Lean-charn	521	328	1,709	1,076	16B	9	NC419525	Ma,5,HF
1082	397	Scotland	785	276	Beinn na Sreine	521	376	1,709	1,234	17E	48	NM456304	Ma,5,HF
1083	621	England	71	37	Sighty Crag	520	295	1,706	968	33	80	NY601809	Ma,5,Dew
1084	435	Scotland	786	301	Ben Horn	520	354	1,706	1,161	16D	17	NC807063	Ma,5,HF
1085	317	England	72	13	Dunkery Beacon	519	414	1,703	1,358	41	181	SS891415	Ma,5,Dew,CoH,CoU,CoA
1086	1175	Scotland	787	747	Creag a' Chliabhain	519	208	1,703	682	09B	26 35	NH575205	Ma,5,HF
1087	408	Scotland	788	283	Coraddie	519	371	1,703	1,217	19C	63	NS050778	Ma,5,HF
1088	480	England	73	28	Boulsworth Hill - Lad Law	518	334	1,699	1,096	36	103	SD929356	Ma,5,Dew
1089	747	Scotland	789	495	Lord Arthur's Hill	518	265	1,699	869	21B	37	NJ513198	Ma,5,HF
1090	1573	Ireland	149	359	Crocknafarragh	517	174	1,696	571	45B	01	B877167	Ma,A,MDew
1091	389	Scotland	790	273	Druim na Cluain-airighe	517	382	1,696	1,253	10B	33	NG751034	Ma,5,HF
1092	1449	Scotland	791	908	Meall Coire an Lochain	517	182	1,696	597	15A	15	NC211065	Ma,5,HF
1093	1327	England	74	96	Long Mynd - Pole Bank	517	193	1,695	633	38A	137	SO415944	Ma,5,Dew
1094	255	Ireland	150	51	Sliabh an Iolair	516	458	1,693	1,503	49A	70	V334989	Ma,A,MDew
1095	1479	Scotland	792	924	Hare Cairn	516	180	1,693	591	07A	44	NO242623	Ma,5,HF
1096	979	Scotland	793	634	An Staonach	516	229	1,693	751	13B	24	NG829480	Ma,5,HF
1097	784	Scotland	794	513	Black Mount	516	258	1,693	846	28A	72	NT079459	Ma,5,DDew
1098	269	Ireland	151	53	Brandon Hill	515	448	1,690	1,470	54B	68	S697402	Ma,A,MDew,CoH,CoU
1099	556	Scotland	795	383	An Sleaghach	515	310	1,690	1,017	18C	49	NM764434	Ma,5,HF
1100	240	Scotland	796	171	Beinn Chapull	515	467	1,690	1,532	19A	55	NM937196	Ma,5,HF
1101	820	Scotland	797	540	Tathabhal	515	252	1,690	827	24A	13	NB042263	Ma,5,HF
1102	1774	Wales	79	138	Mynydd Llangorse	515	161	1,690	528	32A	161	SO159266	Ma,5,Dew
1103	358	Ireland	152	67	Knocklayd	514	392	1,686	1,286	43C	05	D115363	Ma,A,MDew
1104	1950	Scotland	798	1195	Meall Luidh Mor	514	152	1,686	499	04B	42	NN416797	Ma,5,HF
1105	673	Scotland	799	448	A' Chruach	514	280	1,686	919	20C	68 69	NR969335	Ma,5,HF
1106	1046	Scotland	800	672	Cracabhal	514	221	1,686	725	24A	13	NB029252	Ma,5,HF
1107	1222	Wales	80	86	Corndon Hill	514	203	1,685	666	31B	137	SO306969	Ma,5,Dew
1108	1757	Scotland	801	1077	Sron Smeur	513	162	1,683	531	04B	42	NN451601	Ma,5,HF
1109	774	England	75	48	Mellbreak	512	260	1,680	853	34B	89	NY148186	Ma,5,Dew,W,B,Sy,Fel
1110	1368	Scotland	802	856	Drumcroy Hill	512	189	1,680	620	05A	42	NN741629	Ma,5,HF
1111	432	Scotland	803	298	Ben Laga	512	356	1,680	1,168	18A	40	NM645621	Ma,5,HF
1112	748	Scotland	804	496	Beinn Ghlas (Oban)	512	265	1,680	869	19A	49	NM957259	Ma,5,HF
1113	1890	Scotland	805	1157	Larriston Fells	512	155	1,680	509	28B	80	NY569920	Ma,5,DDew
1114	398	Ireland	153	78	Sliabh Tuaidh	511	376	1,677	1,234	45C	10	G628899	Ma,A,MDew
1115	1069	Scotland	806	688	Deuchary Hill	511	218	1,677	715	06B	52 53	NO037485	Ma,5,HF
1116	1125	Scotland	807	720	Smean	511	212	1,677	696	16C	17	ND032276	Ma,5,HF
1117	1263	Scotland	808	800	Maovally	511	199	1,677	653	16E	16	NC378212	Ma,5,HF
1118	651	Scotland	809	435	Stronend	511	286	1,677	938	26A	57	NS629894	Ma,5,DDew
1119	1747	Scotland	810	1071	Kirkland Hill	511	163	1,677	535	27C	71	NS731162	Ma,5,DDew
1120	1943	Wales	81	155	Foel Fenlli	511	152	1,676	500	30C	116	SJ164600	Ma,5,Dew
1121	1023	Scotland	811	660	Creag Bhan	510	224	1,673	735	10D	40	NM782846	Ma,5,HF
1122	909	Scotland	812	593	Ben Dreavie	510	238	1,673	781	16E	15	NC260398	Ma,5,HF
1123	1024	Scotland	813	661	Dungavel Hill	510	224	1,673	735	27A	71 72	NS942305	Ma,5,DDew
1124	1404	Ireland	154	315	Knockanaguish	509	186	1,670	610	52A	78	V919768	Ma,A,MDew
1125	557	Ireland	155	110	Clermont Carn	508	310	1,667	1,017	56A	29 36	J099157	Ma,A,MDew
1126	1601	Ireland	156	366	Slieveanorra	508	172	1,667	564	43C	05	D134266	Ma,A,MDew
1127	1328	Scotland	814	839	Beinn Dubh	508	193	1,667	633	01C	56	NN404045	Ma,5,HF
1128	491	Scotland	815	335	Beinn Leamhain	508	331	1,667	1,086	18B	40	NM957622	Ma,5,HF
1129	779	Scotland	816	509	Cruach an Lochain	508	259	1,667	850	19C	56	NS049938	Ma,5,HF
1130	1718	Scotland	817	1055	Scrinadle	508	165	1,667	541	20A	61	NR505778	Ma,5,HF
1131	558	England	76	32	Cracoe Fell	508	310	1,666	1,017	35B	103	SD993588	Ma,5,Dew
1132	1926	Ireland	157	424	Knocknagorraveela	507	153	1,663	502	51A	85	V871624	Ma,A,MDew
1133	1913	Wales	82	150	Disgwylfa Fawr	507	154	1,663	505	31A	135	SN737847	Ma,5,Dew
1134	1423	Ireland	158	320	Coomagearlahy	506	184	1,660	604	52A	79	W095772	Ma,A,MDew
1135	594	Scotland	818	406	Meall Dheirgidh	506	303	1,660	994	15A	20	NH473943	Ma,5,HF
1136	207	Scotland	819	145	Beinn Dhubh	506	493	1,660	1,617	24B	14 18	NB089006	Ma,5,HF
1137	1010	England	77	71	Little Mell Fell	505	226	1,657	741	34C	90	NY423240	Ma,5,Dew,W,B,Sy,Fel
1138	834	Scotland	820	549	Beinn na Croise	503	250	1,650	820	17E	48	NM559251	Ma,5,HF
1139	335	Ireland	159	61	Raghtin More	502	403	1,647	1,322	45A	02 03	C338455	Ma,A,MDew
1140	1837	England	78	155	Shillhope Law	501	158	1,644	518	33	80	NT873096	Ma,5,Dew
1141	515	Ireland	160	104	Common Mountain	501	320	1,644	1,050	45C	10	G709859	Ma,A,MDew
1142	1025	Ireland	161	224	Great Sugar Loaf	501	224	1,644	735	55B	56	O237130	Ma,A,MDew
1143	1463	Scotland	821	915	Glas Bheinn	501	181	1,644	594	03A	50	NN326473	Ma,5,HF
1144	647	Scotland	822	432	Carn a' Bhodaich	501	287	1,644	942	12B	26	NH569375	Ma,5,HF
1145	1424	Scotland	823	894	Black Hill	501	184	1,644	604	28A	65 66	NT188631	Ma,5,DDew
1146	1425	England	79	109	Kisdon	499	184	1,636	604	35A	98	SD899998	Ma,4
1147	1196	Wales	83	82	Garreg Lwyd	498	205	1,634	673	31B	136 147	SN942733	Ma,4
1148	1664	Scotland	824	1024	Creigh Hill	498	168	1,634	552	07A	53	NO270593	Ma,4
1149	1369	Scotland	825	857	Law Kneis	498	189	1,634	620	28B	79	NT292130	Ma,4
1150	443	Ireland	162	87	Foilclogh	497	350	1,631	1,148	50A	83	V508745	Ma,4
1151	1491	Scotland	826	927	Griomabhal	497	179	1,631	587	24A	13	NB011220	Ma,4
1152	985	Scotland	827	639	Innerdouny Hill	497	228	1,631	748	26A	58	NO032073	Ma,4,CoH
1153	1011	Scotland	828	655	Sgurr na Stri	495	226	1,624	741	17B	32	NG500192	Ma,4
1154	1164	Ireland	163	260	Mullaghmesha	494	209	1,622	686	52B	85 89	W090513	Ma,4
1155	1399	England	80	107	Grayrigg Forest	494	187	1,621	614	34C	97	SD598998	Ma,4
1156	603	Ireland	164	122	Bulbin	494	300	1,621	984	45A	02 03	C357423	Ma,4
1157	1191	Scotland	829	756	Benaquhallie	494	206	1,621	676	21B	37	NJ606087	Ma,4
1158	1165	Ireland	165	261	Cruach na Rad	493	209	1,617	686	45C	10	G676786	Ma,4
1159	1653	Ireland	166	381	Seefin	493	169	1,617	554	50A	78	V687899	Ma,4
1160	1873	Scotland	830	1144	Ruadh Stac	493	156	1,617	512	17B	32	NG514232	Ma,4
1161	622	Scotland	831	419	Cairnsmore	493	295	1,617	968	27B	77	NX583757	Ma,4
1162	934	Scotland	832	605	Allermuir Hill	493	235	1,617	771	28A	66	NT227661	Ma,4
1163	1903	Scotland	833	1166	Meall an Tarsaid	492	155	1,615	508	09B	34	NH491130	Ma,4
1164	1787	Scotland	834	1095	Meall Mor	492	160	1,614	525	03C	50	NN303471	Ma,4
1165	1556	Scotland	835	965	Meall Mor	492	175	1,614	574	09A	27	NH737355	Ma,4
1166	570	Scotland	836	391	Liuthaid	492	307	1,614	1,007	24B	13 14	NB175136	Ma,4
1167	1775	Scotland	837	1087	Lamington Hill	492	161	1,614	528	28B	72	NT001304	Ma,4
1168	1902	Scotland	838	1165	The Bochel	491	155	1,612	508	21A	36	NJ232232	Ma,4
1169	470	Scotland	839	322	Carn Duchara	491	338	1,611	1,109	19A	55	NM892102	Ma,4
1170	210	Scotland	840	147	Beinn Bheigier	491	491	1,611	1,611	20B	60	NR429564	Ma,4,SIB
1171	1104	Scotland	841	710	Meall nan Each	490	214	1,608	702	18A	40	NM632643	Ma,4
1172	1089	Ireland	167	239	Silvermine Mountains West Top	489	216	1,604	709	53B	59	R820697	Ma,4
1173	248	Scotland	842	176	Healabhal Bheag	489	462	1,604	1,516	17A	23	NG224420	Ma,4
1174	707	Scotland	843	472	Huiseabhal Mor	489	272	1,604	892	24B	13	NB022116	Ma,4
1175	353	Ireland	168	66	Knockoura	488	393	1,601	1,289	51A	84	V621462	Ma,4
1176	1927	Isle of Man	2	4	Slieau Freoaghane	488	153	1,601	502	29	95	SC340883	Ma,4
1177	1602	Scotland	844	992	Common Hill	488	172	1,601	564	27A	71	NS791307	Ma,4
1178	1634	Wales	84	122	Bryn Amlwg	488	170	1,601	558	31A	136	SN921973	Ma,4
1179	1810	Scotland	845	1109	Creag Bheag	487	159	1,598	522	09B	35	NH745017	Ma,4
1180	1758	Wales	85	136	Pen y Garn-goch	487	162	1,598	531	31C	147	SN884502	Ma,4
1181	1197	Scotland	846	759	Creag Ghiubhais	486	205	1,594	673	07A	37 44	NO312954	Ma,4
1182	459	Wales	86	27	Ysgyryd Fawr	486	344	1,594	1,129	32A	161	SO331182	Ma,4
1183	1508	Scotland	847	941	Steele's Knowe	486	178	1,593	584	26A	58	NN969079	Ma,4
1184	1492	Ireland	169	338	Slievemartin	485	179	1,591	587	43B	29 36	J201176	Ma,4
1185	1000	Scotland	848	648	Carn nan Iomairean	485	227	1,591	745	12A	25	NG914352	Ma,4
1186	447	Scotland	849	309	Creag Riabhach	485	349	1,591	1,145	16A	9	NC278638	Ma,4
1187	238	Scotland	850	169	Dubh Bheinn	485	468	1,591	1,535	20A	61	NR581889	Ma,4
1188	1672	Scotland	851	1028	Carleatheran	485	168	1,591	551	26A	57	NS687918	Ma,4
1189	1986	Wales	87	157	Garreg-hir	485	151	1,591	494	31A	136	SN998979	Ma,4
1190	1995	Ireland	170	444	Crohaun	484	150	1,588	492	54A	75 82	S275005	Ma,4
1191	612	Ireland	171	128	Scalp Mountain	484	298	1,588	978	45A	07	C406271	Ma,4
1192	1654	Scotland	852	1016	Maiden Pap	484	169	1,588	554	16C	11 17	ND048293	Ma,4
1193	285	Isle of Man	3	2	South Barrule	483	436	1,585	1,430	29	95	SC257759	Ma,4
1194	1530	Wales	88	111	Bryn y Fan	482	177	1,581	581	31A	136	SN931884	Ma,4
1195	1748	England	81	143	Dufton Pike	481	163	1,578	535	35A	91	NY699266	Ma,4
1196	222	Scotland	853	157	Ward Hill	481	481	1,578	1,578	23	6 7	HY228022	Ma,4,CoH,CoU,CoA,SIB
1197	859	Wales	89	50	Hirfynydd	481	246	1,578	807	32B	160	SN839076	Ma,4
1198	460	Ireland	172	89	Devilsbit Mountain	480	344	1,575	1,129	53B	59	S057744	Ma,4
1199	1412	Ireland	173	317	Mullaghash	480	185	1,575	607	44B	07	C640019	Ma,4
1200	1811	Scotland	854	1110	Carn na Dubh Choille	480	159	1,575	522	14B	20	NH387673	Ma,4
1201	1990	Scotland	855	1214	Sail Chalmadale	480	151	1,574	494	20C	62 69	NR914401	Ma,4
1202	704	Scotland	856	469	Beinn Chlaonleud	479	273	1,572	896	18C	49	NM748542	Ma,4
1203	1126	Scotland	857	721	Wether Law	479	212	1,572	696	28A	72	NT194483	Ma,4
1204	391	Ireland	174	74	Divis	478	380	1,568	1,247	43C	15	J280754	Ma,4,CoU
1205	1264	Wales	90	89	Mynydd Epynt	478	199	1,568	653	32A	147	SN961464	Ma,4
1206	1788	Ireland	175	404	Cummeen	477	160	1,565	525	49B	71	Q630076	Ma,4
1207	1493	Scotland	858	928	A' Bheinn Bhan	477	179	1,565	587	18B	40	NM945665	Ma,4
1208	965	Scotland	859	623	Craignell	477	231	1,565	758	27B	77	NX509750	Ma,4
1209	886	Wales	91	53	Gwastedyn Hill	477	242	1,565	794	31B	136 147	SN986661	Ma,4
1210	871	England	82	56	Hail Storm Hill	477	244	1,564	801	36	109	SD834193	Ma,4
1211	1037	Ireland	176	229	Cruach Mhin an Neanta	476	222	1,562	728	45C	11	G941947	Ma,4
1212	1105	Ireland	177	242	Douce Mountain	476	214	1,562	702	52B	85	W123614	Ma,4
1213	1851	Scotland	860	1132	Beinn Sgeireach	476	157	1,562	515	16E	16	NC453118	Ma,4
1214	1719	Scotland	861	1056	Craiglich	476	165	1,562	541	21B	37	NJ533054	Ma,4
1215	644	Ireland	178	139	Agnew's Hill	474	288	1,555	945	43C	09	D327015	Ma,4
1216	1215	Scotland	862	768	Beinn Donn	473	204	1,552	669	03B	49	NM961477	Ma,4
1217	1100	Scotland	863	707	Meall an Fhuarain	472	215	1,549	705	16B	16	NC513305	Ma,4
1218	1228	Scotland	864	775	Creag Dhubh Bheag	472	203	1,549	666	16B	16	NC474307	Ma,4
1219	1176	Scotland	865	748	Glas Bheinn	472	208	1,549	682	20B	60	NR429592	Ma,4
1220	813	Wales	92	48	Mynydd Twyn-glas	472	253	1,549	830	32C	171	ST259978	Ma,4
1221	1271	Ireland	179	287	Doughill Mountain	471	198	1,545	650	52B	85	W112632	Ma,4
1222	1336	Scotland	866	845	Beinn Mhor	471	192	1,545	630	09A	36	NH993281	Ma,4
1223	1426	Scotland	867	895	Healabhal Mhor	471	184	1,545	604	17A	23	NG219445	Ma,4
1224	640	Scotland	868	428	Ben Aigan	471	289	1,545	948	21A	28	NJ309481	Ma,4
1225	1077	Scotland	869	693	Hill of Fare	471	217	1,545	712	21B	38	NJ671029	Ma,4
1226	1759	Scotland	870	1078	Cacra Hill	471	162	1,545	531	28B	79	NT317173	Ma,4
1227	1450	Ireland	180	329	Na Leargacha	471	182	1,544	597	45B	02	B984261	Ma,4
1228	841	England	83	51	Lingmoor Fell	470	248	1,542	814	34B	90	NY302046	Ma,4,W,B,Sy,Fel
1229	1531	Scotland	871	952	Creachan Dubh	470	177	1,542	581	19C	55	NS015910	Ma,4
1230	510	Scotland	872	351	Gormol	470	322	1,542	1,056	24A	13 14	NB301069	Ma,4
1231	842	Scotland	873	554	Fell of Fleet	470	248	1,542	814	27B	77	NX566706	Ma,4
1232	436	Ireland	181	85	Loughsalt Mountain	469	354	1,539	1,161	45B	02	C133264	Ma,4
1233	1874	Wales	93	144	Craig Goch	468	156	1,536	512	30F	124 125	SH804099	Ma,4
1234	1749	Scotland	874	1072	Beinn Bhreac	468	163	1,535	535	20A	61	NR597908	Ma,4
1235	1875	Scotland	875	1145	Spartleton	468	156	1,535	512	28A	67	NT653655	Ma,4
1236	1439	Ireland	182	326	Cooneen Hill	467	183	1,532	600	53B	59	R902680	Ma,4
1237	1914	Scotland	876	1173	An Grianan	467	154	1,532	505	16A	9	NC264627	Ma,4
1238	1255	Scotland	877	797	Meall an t-Slamain	467	200	1,532	656	18B	41	NN071739	Ma,4
1239	666	Scotland	878	443	Hill of Foudland	467	282	1,532	925	21B	29	NJ603332	Ma,4
1240	1464	Wales	94	103	Moel Gyw	467	181	1,532	594	30C	116	SJ171575	Ma,4
1241	674	Scotland	879	449	Cruach Lusach	467	280	1,531	919	19B	55	NR786832	Ma,4
1242	1981	Scotland	880	1207	Meall Chomraidh	466	151	1,530	495	02A	42 51	NN483556	Ma,4
1243	309	Ireland	183	59	Minaun	466	420	1,529	1,378	46C	30	F661019	Ma,4
1244	1090	Scotland	881	699	Beinn Sgluich	466	216	1,529	709	03B	49	NM966512	Ma,4
1245	971	Scotland	882	629	Bidein Clann Raonaild	466	230	1,529	755	13B	25	NH053591	Ma,4
1246	1440	Scotland	883	901	Bioda Buidhe	466	183	1,529	600	17A	23	NG439664	Ma,4
1247	1673	Scotland	884	1029	Middlefield Law	466	168	1,529	551	27A	71	NS681307	Ma,4
1248	1852	Wales	95	140	Carn Gafallt	466	157	1,529	515	31C	147	SN940646	Ma,4
1249	1616	Ireland	184	373	Benbradagh	465	171	1,526	561	44B	08	C722113	Ma,4
1250	1400	Scotland	885	878	Meall na h-Eilrig	465	187	1,526	614	12B	26	NH537326	Ma,4
1251	1509	Scotland	886	942	Feinne-bheinn Mhor	465	178	1,526	584	16B	9	NC434462	Ma,4
1252	904	Scotland	887	591	Beinn na h-Uamha (Morvern)	465	240	1,526	787	18C	49	NM682534	Ma,4
1253	881	Scotland	888	578	Beinn Lagan	465	243	1,526	797	19C	56	NS119996	Ma,4
1254	551	Ireland	185	109	Slievereagh	465	312	1,524	1,024	53A	73	R725252	Ma,4
1255	887	Scotland	889	581	Tom Bailgeann	464	242	1,522	794	09B	26 35	NH588294	Ma,4
1256	1812	Scotland	890	1111	Breac-Bheinn	464	159	1,522	522	15A	20	NH498950	Ma,4
1257	1038	Wales	96	67	Esgair Ddu	464	222	1,522	728	31A	124 125	SH873106	Ma,4
1258	374	Ireland	186	72	Crockauns	463	386	1,519	1,266	45D	16	G759409	Ma,4
1259	1789	Scotland	891	1096	Benbeoch	463	160	1,519	525	27C	70 77	NS495082	Ma,4
1260	735	Ireland	187	160	Dough Mountain	462	266	1,516	873	45D	16 17	G941423	Ma,4
1261	249	Ireland	188	50	Knockmore (Clare Island)	462	462	1,516	1,516	47A	30	L669861	Ma,4
1262	1198	Wales	97	83	Crugiau Merched	462	205	1,516	673	31C	146 147	SN722455	Ma,4
1263	692	Scotland	892	460	Beinn a' Bhraghad	461	276	1,512	906	17B	32	NG409254	Ma,4
1264	1494	Scotland	893	929	Bishop Hill	461	179	1,512	587	26A	58	NO185043	Ma,4
1265	802	Ireland	189	176	Cullaun	460	255	1,509	837	53B	66	R824574	Ma,4
1266	538	Scotland	894	368	Drummond Hill	460	314	1,509	1,030	02B	51 52	NN749454	Ma,4
1267	1127	Scotland	895	722	Fashven	460	212	1,509	696	16A	9	NC313675	Ma,4
1268	328	Scotland	896	234	Roineabhal	460	406	1,509	1,332	24B	18	NG042860	Ma,4
1269	1891	Wales	98	146	Cefn Cenarth	460	155	1,509	509	31B	136 147	SN969762	Ma,4
1270	708	England	84	41	Caer Caradoc Hill	460	272	1,508	892	38A	137 138	SO477953	Ma,4
1271	1465	Scotland	897	916	Beinn Dubh Airigh	459	181	1,506	594	19A	55	NM958035	Ma,4
1272	1116	Ireland	190	247	Gortagarry	458	213	1,503	699	53B	59	S031732	Ma,4
1273	361	Ireland	191	68	Carrane Hill	458	391	1,503	1,283	45D	25 26	G844206	Ma,4
1274	1154	Scotland	898	739	Cruach nan Caorach	458	210	1,503	689	19C	55	NR991804	Ma,4
1275	1466	Scotland	899	917	Tighvein	458	181	1,503	594	20C	69	NR997274	Ma,4
1276	1128	Ireland	192	249	Tooreen Hill	457	212	1,499	696	53B	66	R910560	Ma,4
1277	337	Ireland	193	63	Tountinna	457	402	1,499	1,319	48A	59	R736772	Ma,4
1278	1928	Scotland	900	1182	Carn Fiaclach	457	153	1,499	502	11B	25	NH278272	Ma,4
1279	1143	Scotland	901	730	Carn nam Bad	457	211	1,499	692	12B	26	NH401339	Ma,4
1280	588	Scotland	902	402	Cairnharrow	457	304	1,499	997	27B	83	NX533561	Ma,4
1281	1984	Scotland	903	1210	Creag na Criche	457	151	1,499	495	01A	52 53	NN985350	Ma,4
1282	1070	England	85	76	Winter Hill	456	218	1,496	715	36	109	SD659149	Ma,4,CoU
1283	1655	Scotland	904	1017	Knock of Braemoray	456	169	1,496	554	09A	27	NJ011417	Ma,4
1284	581	Scotland	905	399	Beinn na Duatharach	456	305	1,496	1,001	17E	49	NM604363	Ma,4
1285	1039	Scotland	906	669	Lendrick Hill	456	222	1,496	728	26A	58	NO019037	Ma,4
1286	354	Scotland	907	250	Craigowl Hill	455	393	1,493	1,289	26A	54	NO376399	Ma,4
1287	1892	England	86	163	Freeholds Top	454	155	1,490	509	36	103	SD906218	Ma,4
1288	322	England	87	14	Urra Moor - Round Hill	454	409	1,490	1,342	37	93	NZ594015	Ma,4
1289	972	Ireland	194	210	Annagh Hill	454	230	1,490	755	55A	62	T100680	Ma,4
1290	1951	Ireland	195	429	Bennaunmore	454	152	1,490	499	52A	79	W035819	Ma,4
1291	280	Scotland	908	203	Beinn an Tuirc	454	440	1,490	1,444	19B	68 69	NR752361	Ma,4
1292	1216	Scotland	909	769	Beinn Conchra	453	204	1,486	669	12A	33	NG887291	Ma,4
1293	1346	England	88	99	Heath Mynd	453	191	1,485	627	38A	137	SO335940	Ma,4
1294	582	Ireland	196	115	Cnoc Leitreach	452	305	1,483	1,001	46B	30	F782004	Ma,4
1295	872	Scotland	910	572	Auchtertyre Hill	452	244	1,483	801	12A	33	NG832289	Ma,4
1296	717	Ireland	197	155	Cruach Eoghanach	451	270	1,480	886	45C	11	H037854	Ma,4
1297	625	Ireland	198	131	Baraveha	451	294	1,480	965	48B	72	R111085	Ma,4
1298	1876	Scotland	911	1146	Cairn Hill	451	156	1,480	512	27C	71 78	NS851070	Ma,4
1299	1720	Scotland	912	1057	Mendick Hill	451	165	1,480	541	28A	65 72	NT121505	Ma,4
1300	973	Scotland	913	630	Calkin Rig	451	230	1,480	755	28B	79	NY288876	Ma,4
1301	1001	Wales	99	65	Aberedw Hill	451	227	1,480	745	31B	147	SO084507	Ma,4
1302	267	Scotland	914	191	Ronas Hill	450	450	1,476	1,476	22	1 3	HU305834	Ma,4,CoH,CoU,CoA,SIB
1303	467	Ireland	199	91	Lackagh Mountain	449	341	1,473	1,119	45D	26	G932321	Ma,4
1304	268	Scotland	915	192	Cruach Scarba	449	449	1,473	1,473	20A	55	NM690044	Ma,4,SIB
1305	654	Scotland	916	437	Caiteseal	449	285	1,473	935	24A	13 14	NB242043	Ma,4
1306	1690	Scotland	917	1036	Hownam Law	449	167	1,473	548	28B	74	NT796219	Ma,4
1307	629	Scotland	918	422	Beinn Bhreac	448	293	1,470	961	17B	32	NG344267	Ma,4
1308	803	Scotland	919	529	Cairn William	448	255	1,470	837	21B	38	NJ656168	Ma,4
1309	1893	Scotland	920	1158	East Lomond	448	155	1,470	509	26A	59	NO244061	Ma,4
1310	888	England	89	60	Binsey	447	242	1,467	794	34A	89 90	NY225355	Ma,4,W,B,Sy,Fel
1311	1656	Scotland	921	1018	Hill of Persie	447	169	1,467	554	06B	53	NO122560	Ma,4
1312	1026	Scotland	922	662	Beinn Lunndaidh	447	224	1,467	735	16D	17	NC791019	Ma,4
1313	1370	Scotland	923	858	Blackwood Hill	447	189	1,467	620	28B	79	NY531961	Ma,4
1314	1117	Scotland	924	716	Stac na Cathaig	446	213	1,463	699	09B	26	NH640301	Ma,4
1315	321	Scotland	925	230	Speinne Mor	446	410	1,463	1,345	17E	47 48	NM499497	Ma,4
1316	290	Scotland	926	210	Cnoc Moy	446	431	1,463	1,414	19B	68	NR611152	Ma,4
1317	1790	Ireland	200	405	Slievenaglogh	445	160	1,460	525	43B	29	J299230	Ma,4
1318	1192	Wales	100	80	Carneddau	445	206	1,460	676	31B	147	SO069551	Ma,4
1319	1354	Ireland	201	304	Knockastanna	444	190	1,457	623	53B	66	R863560	Ma,4
1320	1674	Ireland	202	384	Mid Hill	444	168	1,457	551	43C	09	D202157	Ma,4
1321	401	Scotland	927	279	Ben Lee	444	375	1,457	1,230	17A	24 32	NG502336	Ma,4
1322	274	Scotland	928	197	Dun Caan	444	444	1,457	1,457	17A	24 32	NG579394	Ma,4,SIB
1323	896	Scotland	929	584	Creag Ghlas Laggan	444	241	1,457	791	20C	62 69	NR977497	Ma,4
1324	681	Ireland	203	149	Binn Ghuaire	442	278	1,450	912	47B	37	L731570	Ma,4
1325	811	Ireland	204	179	Leahanmore	442	254	1,450	833	45B	06	C017166	Ma,4
1326	1118	Wales	101	73	Rhiw Gwraidd	442	213	1,450	699	31B	147	SO016634	Ma,4
1327	843	England	90	52	Tosson Hill	441	248	1,447	814	33	81	NZ004982	Ma,4
1328	1371	Scotland	930	859	Beinn Bhreac	441	189	1,447	620	20A	61	NR533778	Ma,4
1329	1129	Ireland	205	250	Foildarg	440	212	1,444	696	53B	66	R895511	Ma,4
1330	1510	Scotland	931	943	Sgurr Bhuidhe	440	178	1,444	584	10D	33 40	NM722945	Ma,4
1331	1865	Wales	102	143	Penycloddiau	440	157	1,442	514	30C	116	SJ127678	Ma,4
1332	495	Scotland	932	337	Roineval	439	330	1,440	1,083	17A	32	NG418350	Ma,4
1333	571	Scotland	933	392	Beneraird	439	307	1,440	1,007	27B	76	NX135785	Ma,4
1334	1996	Ireland	206	445	Slemish	437	150	1,434	492	43C	09	D221053	Ma,4
1335	889	Scotland	934	582	Seana Mheallan	437	242	1,434	794	13B	25	NG928551	Ma,4
1336	637	Scotland	935	427	Meall nan Con	437	290	1,434	951	18A	47	NM503681	Ma,4
1337	1451	Scotland	936	909	Beinn a' Chaisil	437	182	1,434	597	18C	49	NM780476	Ma,4
1338	1574	Scotland	937	974	Carn Dearg	437	174	1,434	571	19A	55	NM896189	Ma,4
1339	1034	Scotland	938	666	An Cruachan	435	223	1,427	732	17B	32	NG381225	Ma,4
1340	521	Scotland	939	356	Cuilags	435	319	1,427	1,047	23	7	HY209033	Ma,4
1341	1241	Scotland	940	784	Goseland Hill	435	201	1,427	659	28B	72	NT071351	Ma,4
1342	1557	England	91	121	Cringle Moor - Drake Howe	434	175	1,424	574	37	93	NZ537029	Ma,4
1343	844	Ireland	207	187	Knockanora	433	248	1,421	814	53B	59	S010711	Ma,4
1344	1791	Ireland	208	406	Knockbane	433	160	1,421	525	53B	66	R942525	Ma,4
1345	1071	Ireland	209	234	Thur Mountain	432	218	1,417	715	45D	17	G980404	Ma,4
1346	1877	Scotland	941	1147	Cnoc an Liath-bhaid Mhoir	432	156	1,417	512	16D	16	NC759291	Ma,4
1347	1199	Scotland	942	760	Cruach nan Cuilean	432	205	1,417	673	19C	56	NS043848	Ma,4
1348	986	Scotland	943	640	Bogrie Hill	432	228	1,417	748	27C	78	NX789858	Ma,4
1349	910	Ireland	210	199	Ballycumber Hill	431	238	1,414	781	55A	62	T028758	Ma,4
1350	395	Ireland	211	77	Croaghmoyle	430	378	1,411	1,240	46B	31	M098982	Ma,4
1351	828	Ireland	212	183	Trooperstown Hill	430	251	1,411	823	55B	56	T166952	Ma,4
1352	1441	Scotland	944	902	Stac Gorm	430	183	1,411	600	09B	26 35	NH630273	Ma,4
1353	595	Scotland	945	407	Knock Hill	430	303	1,411	994	21A	29	NJ537551	Ma,4
1354	293	Scotland	946	213	Conachair	430	430	1,411	1,411	25	18	NA099002	Ma,4,SIB
1355	1635	Ireland	213	375	Buailte Padraig	429	170	1,407	558	45C	06 11	G967980	Ma,4
1356	589	Ireland	214	118	Taobh an Leithid	429	304	1,407	997	45B	01	B872261	Ma,4
1357	1617	Scotland	947	996	Sgorr nam Faoileann	429	171	1,407	561	20B	60	NR432606	Ma,4
1358	944	Ireland	215	205	Scraigs	428	234	1,404	768	45C	11	B934013	Ma,4
1359	1707	Scotland	948	1047	Ord Ban	428	166	1,404	545	08A	35 36	NH891085	Ma,4
1360	1047	Scotland	949	673	Beinn na Lice	428	221	1,404	725	19B	68	NR602085	Ma,4
1361	545	Scotland	950	373	Suaineabhal	428	313	1,404	1,027	24A	13	NB077308	Ma,4
1362	1256	Ireland	216	282	Knockalough	427	200	1,401	656	53B	66	R982584	Ma,4
1363	1217	Ireland	217	274	Liathan	427	204	1,401	669	45C	10	G517802	Ma,4
1364	1130	Scotland	951	723	Beinn Dearg	427	212	1,401	696	01C	57	NN588037	Ma,4
1365	1813	Scotland	952	1112	White Meldon	427	159	1,401	522	28A	73	NT219428	Ma,4
1366	1845	England	92	157	Hergest Ridge	427	158	1,401	517	38B	148	SO254562	Ma,4
1367	641	Ireland	218	138	Knocknaskagh	427	289	1,399	948	53A	80	W703950	Ma,4
1368	1427	Ireland	219	321	Knockeirka	426	184	1,398	604	51A	85	V930666	Ma,4
1369	890	Ireland	220	193	Roighne Mhor	426	242	1,398	794	47C	37	L916585	Ma,4
1370	1721	Scotland	953	1058	Broomy Law	426	165	1,398	541	28A	72	NT085428	Ma,4
1371	473	England	93	27	Worcestershire Beacon	425	337	1,394	1,106	38B	150	SO768452	Ma,4,CoH,CoU
1372	1838	Ireland	221	417	Bohaun (Bothan)	424	158	1,391	518	47C	38	M006559	Ma,4
1373	451	Scotland	954	312	Beinn na Drise	424	347	1,391	1,138	17E	47 48	NM475427	Ma,4
1374	1182	Scotland	955	750	Muaitheabhal	424	207	1,391	679	24A	13 14	NB257114	Ma,4
1375	1290	Scotland	956	816	Rubers Law	424	196	1,391	643	28B	80	NT580155	Ma,4
1376	1987	Scotland	957	1211	Beinn Dearg	424	151	1,390	494	16A	9	NC279658	Ma,4
1377	1952	Scotland	958	1196	Sell Moor Hill	424	152	1,390	499	28A	73	NT480444	Ma,4
1378	1419	Scotland	959	892	Braigh na h-Eaglaise	424	185	1,390	606	16C	17	ND064220	Ma,4
1379	736	England	94	44	Low Fell	423	266	1,388	873	34B	89	NY137226	Ma,4,W,B,Sy,Fel
1380	655	Ireland	222	141	Camlough Mountain	423	285	1,388	935	43A	29	J049253	Ma,4
1381	1291	Scotland	960	817	Meall Meadhonach	423	196	1,388	643	16B	9	NC410627	Ma,4
1382	793	Scotland	961	520	Meigle Hill	423	256	1,388	840	28A	73	NT466360	Ma,4
1383	935	Wales	103	60	Graig Syfyrddin	423	235	1,388	771	32A	161	SO403210	Ma,4
1384	590	Ireland	223	119	Slieveboy	422	304	1,385	997	55A	69	T022571	Ma,4
1385	522	Scotland	962	357	Cnoc a' Bhaile-shios	422	319	1,385	1,047	19B	62	NR863628	Ma,4
1386	1589	Scotland	963	984	Eildon Mid Hill	422	173	1,385	568	28B	73	NT548322	Ma,4
1387	1511	Ireland	224	341	Farscallop	421	178	1,380	584	45B	06	B993170	Ma,4
1388	539	England	95	30	Brown Willy	420	314	1,378	1,030	40	201	SX158799	Ma,4,CoH,CoU,CoA
1389	737	Ireland	225	161	Stookeen	420	266	1,378	873	55A	62	S945682	Ma,4
1390	464	Ireland	226	90	Bessy Bell	420	342	1,378	1,122	44A	12	H390820	Ma,4
1391	626	Scotland	964	420	Meall an Doirein	420	294	1,378	965	13A	19	NG859754	Ma,4
1392	1283	Scotland	965	810	Beinn Ghlas (Lochgilphead)	420	197	1,378	646	19A	55	NR989992	Ma,4
1393	1347	Scotland	966	849	Dumyat	419	191	1,375	627	26A	57	NS835976	Ma,4
1394	1953	Ireland	227	430	Slievecorragh	418	152	1,371	499	55A	56	N948041	Ma,4
1395	312	Scotland	967	224	Da Sneug	418	418	1,371	1,371	22	4	HT947395	Ma,4,SIB
1396	762	Wales	104	43	Mynydd Marchywel	418	263	1,371	863	32B	170	SN768037	Ma,4
1397	891	Ireland	228	194	Knocknasliggaun	417	242	1,368	794	45E	24	G371156	Ma,4
1398	1636	Ireland	229	376	Urris Hills	417	170	1,368	558	45A	02 03	C307418	Ma,4
1399	1061	Scotland	968	681	Beinn Dubhain	417	219	1,368	719	16C	17	NC936207	Ma,4
1400	723	Scotland	969	483	Beinn na Greine	417	269	1,368	883	17A	23	NG459416	Ma,4
1401	1428	Scotland	970	896	Fell Hill	417	184	1,368	604	27C	77	NX721844	Ma,4
1402	440	Ireland	230	86	Binn Shleibhe	416	352	1,365	1,155	47C	38	M049549	Ma,4
1403	1776	Ireland	231	401	Curraghchosaly Mountain	416	161	1,365	528	44B	13	H478839	Ma,4
1404	1242	Scotland	971	785	Cademuir Hill	416	201	1,365	659	28B	73	NT241376	Ma,4
1405	1106	Ireland	232	243	Benbo	415	214	1,362	702	45D	16 25 26	G850377	Ma,4
1406	675	Scotland	972	450	Cruach Tairbeirt	415	280	1,362	919	01D	56	NN312058	Ma,4
1407	1532	Scotland	973	953	Creag Loisgte	415	177	1,362	581	15A	20	NH367957	Ma,4
1408	1853	Wales	105	141	The Begwns	415	157	1,362	515	31B	148 161	SO155444	Ma,4
1409	1348	Wales	106	95	Trichrug	415	191	1,362	627	32B	160	SN698229	Ma,4
1410	897	Scotland	974	585	Strathfinella Hill	414	241	1,358	791	07B	45	NO693787	Ma,4
1411	1299	Scotland	975	820	Beinn a' Mheadhain	414	195	1,358	640	11A	25 33	NG918288	Ma,4
1412	1814	Scotland	976	1113	Meadie Ridge	414	159	1,358	522	16B	9	NC499438	Ma,4
1413	835	Ireland	233	185	Knocknagullion	413	250	1,355	820	50B	84	V761696	Ma,4
1414	987	Ireland	234	212	Largan Hill	413	228	1,355	748	45E	24	G391177	Ma,4
1415	416	Scotland	977	289	Ben Tianavaig	413	366	1,355	1,201	17A	23 24	NG511409	Ma,4
1416	540	Scotland	978	369	Beinn Bhuidhe	413	314	1,355	1,030	17E	47 48	NM590399	Ma,4
1417	370	Ireland	235	71	Bolus	410	388	1,345	1,273	50A	83	V399635	Ma,4
1418	1413	Scotland	979	888	Mile Hill	410	185	1,345	607	07A	53	NO311571	Ma,4
1419	709	Scotland	980	473	Beinn a' Chaoinich	410	272	1,345	892	10A	33	NG859183	Ma,4
1420	1405	Ireland	236	316	Spinans Hill	409	186	1,342	610	55A	55	S919915	Ma,4
1421	1894	Scotland	981	1159	Beinn Bhac-ghlais	409	155	1,342	509	17A	23	NG229405	Ma,4
1422	1929	Scotland	982	1183	Millstone Hill	409	153	1,342	502	21B	38	NJ676202	Ma,4
1423	1315	Scotland	983	832	Ben Hutig	408	194	1,339	636	16B	10	NC538652	Ma,4
1424	583	Wales	107	33	Long Mountain	408	305	1,339	1,001	31B	126	SJ264058	Ma,4
1425	559	Ireland	237	111	Mount Gabriel	407	310	1,335	1,017	51B	88	V931348	Ma,4
1426	988	Ireland	238	213	Owenreagh Hill	407	228	1,335	748	44B	12	H420959	Ma,4
1427	1675	Scotland	984	1030	Creag nan Clag	407	168	1,335	551	09B	26 35	NH597283	Ma,4
1428	1815	Scotland	985	1114	Creag Mhor	407	159	1,335	522	12A	25	NG903316	Ma,4
1429	1414	Scotland	986	889	Blaeloch Hill	407	185	1,335	607	27A	63	NS243553	Ma,4
1430	560	England	96	33	The Wrekin	407	310	1,335	1,017	38A	127	SJ628081	Ma,4,CoU
1431	860	Ireland	239	190	Esknabrock	406	246	1,332	807	52A	79	W027771	Ma,4
1432	1691	Scotland	987	1037	Guaineamol	405	167	1,329	548	24A	13 14	NB260133	Ma,4
1433	365	Scotland	988	257	Druim Fada	405	390	1,329	1,280	17E	49	NM646225	Ma,4
1434	928	Wales	108	57	Foel Offrwm	405	236	1,329	774	30D	124	SH749209	Ma,4
1435	1880	Scotland	989	1149	Creag Thoraraidh	405	155	1,327	509	16C	17	ND040187	Ma,4
1436	474	Ireland	240	94	Slieve Rushen	404	336	1,325	1,102	45D	27	H234226	Ma,4
1437	1618	Scotland	990	997	Birnam Hill - King's Seat	404	171	1,325	561	01A	52 53	NO032401	Ma,4
1438	770	Wales	109	45	Moel y Golfa	403	261	1,323	856	31B	126	SJ290125	Ma,4
1439	1385	Ireland	241	312	Balix Hill	403	188	1,322	617	44B	13	H475962	Ma,4
1440	1355	Ireland	242	305	Ballincurra Hill	403	190	1,322	623	53B	59	R924698	Ma,4
1441	1072	Ireland	243	235	Cruach Mharthain	403	218	1,322	715	49A	70	Q336024	Ma,4
1442	1091	Scotland	991	700	Meall Lochan a' Chleirich	403	216	1,322	709	13A	19	NG872716	Ma,4
1443	873	England	97	57	Rombalds Moor	402	244	1,319	801	35B	104	SE114452	Ma,4
1444	1854	Scotland	992	1133	Craigendarroch	402	157	1,319	515	21A	37 44	NO365965	Ma,4
1445	1941	Scotland	993	1190	Cnoc na Maoile	401	153	1,316	500	16C	17	ND007212	Ma,4
1446	475	Ireland	244	95	Cnoc Lios Uachtair	401	336	1,316	1,102	47C	44	L859495	Ma,4
1447	566	Scotland	994	387	Duncolm	401	308	1,316	1,010	26A	64	NS470774	Ma,4,CoU
1448	1012	Ireland	245	219	Carrigeenamronety Hill	401	226	1,315	741	53A	73	R700160	Ma,4
1449	1954	Ireland	246	431	Cushbawn	400	152	1,312	499	55A	62	T141830	Ma,4
1450	488	Ireland	247	98	Maghera	400	332	1,312	1,089	48A	52	R517910	Ma,4
1451	1558	Scotland	995	966	Craig of Monievreckie	400	175	1,312	574	01C	57	NN547020	Ma,4
1452	1603	Ireland	248	367	Donald's Hill	399	172	1,309	564	44B	08	C743173	Ma
1453	437	Scotland	996	302	Knap of Trowieglen	399	354	1,309	1,161	23	6 7	ND239984	Ma,3
1454	511	Ireland	249	102	Belmore Mountain	398	322	1,306	1,056	44A	17	H138417	Ma
1455	483	Scotland	997	329	Bleabhal	398	333	1,306	1,093	24B	18	NG030914	Ma,3
1456	1406	Scotland	998	882	Bennan	398	186	1,306	610	27C	84	NX821769	Ma,3
1457	1855	Scotland	999	1134	Dirrington Great Law	398	157	1,306	515	28A	67 74	NT698549	Ma,3
1458	676	Ireland	250	147	Knocknaskereighta	397	280	1,302	919	50A	83	V407710	Ma
1459	892	Ireland	251	195	Muskeagh Hill	397	242	1,302	794	55A	62	T011730	Ma
1460	1048	Scotland	1000	674	Glas Bheinn	397	221	1,302	725	10A	33	NG821227	Ma,3
1461	1895	Scotland	1001	1160	Sgreadan Hill	397	155	1,302	509	19B	68	NR741295	Ma,3
1462	814	Scotland	1002	534	Beinn Mheadhanach	397	253	1,302	830	24A	13 14	NB090235	Ma,3
1463	1316	England	98	94	Easington Fell	396	194	1,299	636	36	103	SD730486	Ma,3
1464	604	Ireland	252	123	Lackavrea	396	300	1,299	984	47C	45	L983495	Ma
1465	718	Ireland	253	156	Loughermore	396	270	1,299	886	44B	07	C589156	Ma
1466	1442	Scotland	1003	903	Cnoc Corr Guinie	396	183	1,299	600	15B	21	NH671754	Ma,3
1467	345	Scotland	1004	244	Mullach na Carn	396	396	1,299	1,299	17C	32	NG605292	Ma,3,SIB
1468	911	Ireland	254	200	Farbreiga	395	238	1,296	781	46B	31	G170025	Ma
1469	1792	Ireland	255	407	Saggart Hill	395	160	1,296	525	55B	50	O018228	Ma
1470	794	Scotland	1005	521	Bad a' Chreamha	395	256	1,296	840	13B	24	NG857366	Ma,3
1471	1533	Wales	110	112	Frenni Fawr	395	177	1,296	581	31C	145	SN202349	Ma,3
1472	350	Scotland	1006	247	An Sgurr	394	394	1,293	1,293	17D	39	NM463847	Ma,3,SIB
1473	974	Scotland	1007	631	Torlum	393	230	1,289	755	26B	57	NN819192	Ma,3
1474	936	Scotland	1008	606	Sithean Bhealaich Chumhaing	393	235	1,289	771	17A	23 24	NG508466	Ma,3
1475	1265	Wales	111	90	Allt yr Esgair	393	199	1,288	653	32A	161	SO126243	Ma,3
1476	1559	Scotland	1009	967	Bishop Forest Hill	392	175	1,286	574	27C	84	NX849796	Ma,3
1477	1512	England	99	116	Bradnor Hill	391	178	1,283	584	38B	148	SO282584	Ma,3
1478	1020	Ireland	256	222	Croughaun Hill	391	225	1,283	738	54A	75	S379110	Ma
1479	1560	Ireland	257	354	Mount Hillary	391	175	1,283	574	48C	80	W425956	Ma
1480	411	Ireland	258	80	Slievecallan	391	368	1,283	1,207	48A	57	R144773	Ma
1481	1200	Scotland	1010	761	An Sgurr	391	205	1,283	673	13B	24	NG857387	Ma,3
1482	471	Scotland	1011	323	Bengairn	391	338	1,283	1,109	27C	84	NX770545	Ma,3
1483	1218	Ireland	259	275	Knockakishaun	390	204	1,280	669	47A	37	L869758	Ma
1484	1619	Scotland	1012	998	Meall Innis an Loichel	390	171	1,280	561	12B	25	NH204389	Ma,3
1485	507	Scotland	1013	348	An Coileach	389	323	1,276	1,060	24B	14 18	NG086927	Ma,3
1486	1722	Wales	112	128	Mynydd Rhyd Ddu	389	165	1,276	541	30C	116	SJ054477	Ma,3
1487	1750	England	100	144	Hallin Fell	388	163	1,273	535	34C	90	NY433198	Ma,3,W,B,Sy,Fel
1488	1575	Ireland	260	360	Bullaunmore	388	174	1,273	571	46B	23 31	G007086	Ma
1489	1467	Ireland	261	331	Preban Hill	388	181	1,273	594	55A	62	T086791	Ma
1490	1590	Scotland	1014	985	Creag nam Fiadh	387	173	1,270	568	16D	17	NC841237	Ma,3
1491	724	England	101	42	Wills Neck	386	269	1,266	883	41	181	ST165351	Ma,3
1492	1337	Ireland	262	299	Knockanouganish	386	192	1,266	630	51A	84	V800599	Ma
1493	1452	Ireland	263	330	Miskish Mountain	386	182	1,266	597	51A	84	V643479	Ma
1494	1257	Ireland	264	283	Tullybrack	386	200	1,266	656	44A	17	H090458	Ma
1495	1676	England	102	134	Gun	385	168	1,263	551	36	118	SJ970615	Ma,3
1496	1637	Ireland	265	377	Binevenagh	385	170	1,263	558	44B	04	C691301	Ma
1497	989	Ireland	266	214	Cruach Leithin	385	228	1,263	748	45C	11	B878032	Ma
1498	1062	Wales	113	71	Mynydd y Lan	385	219	1,263	719	32C	171	ST209923	Ma,3
1499	1338	Scotland	1015	846	Biod Mor	384	192	1,260	630	17B	32	NG370273	Ma,3
1500	1793	Scotland	1016	1097	The Slate	384	160	1,260	525	19B	68	NR633165	Ma,3
1501	1534	Scotland	1017	954	Heileasbhal Mor	384	177	1,260	581	24B	14 18	NG073927	Ma,3
1502	379	Scotland	1018	266	Heabhal	384	384	1,260	1,260	24D	31	NL678994	Ma,3,SIB
1503	380	Scotland	1019	267	Mullach an Eilein	384	384	1,260	1,260	25	18	NA153053	Ma,3,SIB
1504	1878	Wales	114	145	Bryn Arw	384	156	1,260	512	32A	161	SO301206	Ma,3
1505	682	Scotland	1020	453	Deadh Choimhead	383	278	1,257	912	19A	49	NM946286	Ma,3
1506	1816	Scotland	1021	1115	Pibble Hill	383	159	1,257	522	27B	83	NX533605	Ma,3
1507	1988	Scotland	1022	1212	Sithean Mor	383	151	1,256	494	13A	19	NG835740	Ma,3
1508	1794	Ireland	267	408	Craignamaddy	382	160	1,253	525	44B	13	H522894	Ma
1509	1547	Ireland	268	351	Gruggandoo	382	176	1,253	577	43B	29	J200255	Ma
1510	1856	Ireland	269	420	Oughtmore	382	157	1,253	515	44B	13	H724837	Ma
1511	1021	Ireland	270	223	Baltinglass Hill	382	225	1,253	738	55A	61	S885892	Ma
1512	1177	Wales	115	78	Moel y Dyniewyd	382	208	1,253	682	30B	115	SH612477	Ma,3
1513	937	Wales	116	61	Cefn Eglwysilan	382	235	1,253	771	32C	171	ST097905	Ma,3
1514	1576	Ireland	271	361	Carrick Mountain	381	174	1,250	571	55B	56	T232940	Ma
1515	1922	Scotland	1023	1178	Hill of Tillymorgan	381	153	1,249	503	21B	29	NJ652348	Ma,3
1516	1839	Ireland	272	418	Burren	380	158	1,247	518	48C	79	W376789	Ma
1517	1955	Ireland	273	432	Derrynafulla SW	380	152	1,247	499	51A	85	V888548	Ma
1518	657	Ireland	274	143	Slieve Beagh	380	284	1,247	932	44A	18	H523436	Ma
1519	1166	Scotland	1024	744	Cnoc an t-Sabhail	380	209	1,247	686	15B	21	NH694787	Ma,3
1520	1219	Scotland	1025	770	Cruach na Seilcheig	380	204	1,247	669	19A	55	NM854110	Ma,3
1521	1144	Wales	117	75	Foel Cae'rberllan	380	211	1,247	692	30F	124	SH676082	Ma,3
1522	627	Ireland	275	132	Maumakeogh	379	294	1,243	965	46A	23	G037368	Ma
1523	1131	Ireland	276	251	Teevnabinnia	379	212	1,243	696	47A	37	L825641	Ma
1524	829	Scotland	1026	546	Dumglow	379	251	1,243	823	26A	58	NT075965	Ma,3
1525	1317	Scotland	1027	833	Beinn Chreagach	379	194	1,242	636	17E	48	NM519216	Ma,3
1526	605	Ireland	277	124	Cappaghabaun Mountain East	378	300	1,240	984	48A	52	R677922	Ma
1527	1997	Scotland	1028	1218	Cairn-mon-earn	378	150	1,240	492	07B	38 45	NO782919	Ma,3
1528	1795	Scotland	1029	1098	Cearnabhal	378	160	1,240	525	24A	13 14	NB186157	Ma,3
1529	1063	Scotland	1030	682	King's Seat	377	219	1,237	719	26A	53	NO230330	Ma,3
1530	1453	Wales	118	101	Mynydd y Glyn	377	182	1,237	597	32C	170	ST031896	Ma,3
1531	719	Ireland	278	157	Bentee	376	270	1,234	886	50A	83	V476780	Ma
1532	1998	Ireland	279	446	Knocknagallaun	376	150	1,234	492	51A	84	V584472	Ma
1533	771	Scotland	1031	505	Cruachan Min	376	261	1,234	856	17E	48	NM445217	Ma,3
1534	399	Scotland	1032	277	Cnoc Glas	376	376	1,234	1,234	25	18	NA062016	Ma,3,SIB
1535	1591	Scotland	1033	986	Corse Hill	376	173	1,234	568	27A	64	NS598464	Ma,3,CoU
1536	845	England	103	53	High Vinnalls	375	248	1,230	814	38B	137 138 148	SO477724	Ma,3
1537	975	Ireland	280	211	Brickany	374	230	1,227	755	49B	71	Q631022	Ma
1538	1054	Ireland	281	231	Croaghacullion	374	220	1,227	722	45C	10	G570869	Ma
1539	980	Scotland	1034	635	Uisinis	374	229	1,227	751	24A	13 14	NB337056	Ma,3
1540	409	Scotland	1035	284	Stulabhal	374	369	1,227	1,211	24C	22	NF806241	Ma,3
1541	1201	Wales	119	84	Mynydd y Betws	373	205	1,224	673	32B	159	SN664094	Ma,3,CoU
1542	1857	Scotland	1036	1135	Struie	373	157	1,224	515	15B	21	NH658849	Ma,3
1543	1073	Scotland	1037	689	Ben Garrisdale	373	218	1,224	715	20A	55 61	NR640938	Ma,3
1544	754	Ireland	282	168	Glenbeg East	372	264	1,220	866	47C	38	M036599	Ma
1545	1202	Scotland	1038	762	Meall a' Chaise	372	205	1,220	673	16D	16	NC651119	Ma,3
1546	1495	Scotland	1039	930	Knockan	372	179	1,220	587	21A	28	NJ351464	Ma,3
1547	1107	Ireland	283	244	Grinlieve	371	214	1,217	702	45A	03	C489384	Ma
1548	1078	Scotland	1040	694	Sgribhis-bheinn	371	217	1,217	712	16A	9	NC319713	Ma,3
1549	462	Wales	120	28	Carn Fadryn	371	343	1,217	1,125	30A	123	SH278351	Ma,3
1550	1132	Ireland	284	252	Knocklettercuss	370	212	1,214	696	46B	23	F876198	Ma
1551	693	Ireland	285	152	Slievekirk	370	276	1,214	906	44B	07	C451082	Ma
1552	919	Scotland	1041	598	Carn Faire nan Con	370	237	1,214	778	12A	26	NH395591	Ma,3
1553	1040	Wales	121	68	Foel Fynyddau	370	222	1,214	728	32C	170	SS782936	Ma,3
1554	1349	Ireland	286	303	Culliagh SE Top	369	191	1,211	627	45B	06 11	C081020	Ma
1555	945	Ireland	287	206	Slievenamuck	369	234	1,211	768	53A	66	R842305	Ma
1556	1329	Scotland	1042	840	Arnaval	369	193	1,211	633	17B	32	NG345316	Ma,3
1557	417	Scotland	1043	290	Ceapabhal	368	365	1,207	1,198	24B	18	NF972924	Ma,3
1558	731	England	104	43	Garway Hill	366	267	1,201	876	38B	161	SO436250	Ma,3
1559	1243	Scotland	1044	786	A' Chruach	366	201	1,201	659	19A	49	NM903218	Ma,3
1560	1330	Scotland	1045	841	Meikle Balloch Hill	366	193	1,201	633	21A	28 29	NJ471495	Ma,3
1561	946	Scotland	1046	612	Bengray	366	234	1,201	768	27B	83	NX630598	Ma,3
1562	1055	Ireland	288	232	Cashlaundrumlahan	365	220	1,198	722	48A	52	M586047	Ma
1563	1108	Ireland	289	245	Coppanagh	365	214	1,198	702	54B	68	S651434	Ma
1564	1155	Ireland	290	256	Carrigatuke	365	210	1,198	689	43A	28	H903320	Ma,CoU
1565	861	England	105	54	Hensbarrow Downs	365	246	1,196	807	40	200	SX001574	Ma,3
1566	1760	Ireland	291	398	Altnapaste	364	162	1,194	531	45C	06 11	H045959	Ma
1567	634	Scotland	1047	425	Sgarbh Breac	364	291	1,194	955	20B	60 61	NR406766	Ma,3
1568	505	Ireland	292	101	Knockalla	363	325	1,191	1,066	45B	02	C235342	Ma
1569	1133	Ireland	293	253	Crockkinnagoe	363	212	1,191	696	45C	12	H124724	Ma
1570	1723	Scotland	1048	1059	An Socach	362	165	1,188	541	16A	9	NC265586	Ma,3
1571	1415	Wales	122	99	Mynydd Machen	362	185	1,188	607	32C	171	ST223900	Ma,3
1572	472	Ireland	294	93	Castlequin	361	338	1,184	1,109	50A	83	V470820	Ma
1573	1930	Scotland	1049	1184	Conic Hill	361	153	1,184	502	01C	56	NS432924	Ma,3
1574	1657	Scotland	1050	1019	The Fruin	361	169	1,184	554	01E	56	NS276872	Ma,3
1575	1896	Wales	123	147	Hafod Ithel	361	155	1,184	509	31C	135	SN610677	Ma,3
1576	710	Scotland	1051	474	Dun Leacainn	360	272	1,181	892	19A	55	NN033016	Ma,3
1577	662	Ireland	295	145	Keshcorran	359	283	1,178	928	45E	25	G712126	Ma
1578	1372	England	106	104	Burrow	358	189	1,175	620	38A	137	SO381830	Ma,3
1579	599	Ireland	296	121	Seanadh Bheara	358	301	1,175	988	47C	45	L933437	Ma
1580	1480	Wales	124	107	Stingwern hill	358	180	1,175	591	31A	136	SJ132014	Ma,3
1581	1373	England	107	105	High Rigg	357	189	1,171	620	34C	90	NY308219	Ma,3,W,B,Sy,Fel
1582	1677	England	108	135	Sharp Haw	357	168	1,171	551	35B	103	SD959552	Ma,3
1583	1356	Ireland	297	306	Lakeen	357	190	1,171	623	55A	62	S976710	Ma
1584	1429	Ireland	298	322	Craigcannon	357	184	1,171	604	45B	02	C244302	Ma
1585	1178	Ireland	299	265	Gartan Mountain	357	208	1,171	682	45B	06	C050207	Ma
1586	1761	Scotland	1052	1079	Cnoc an Daimh Mor	357	162	1,171	531	16B	10	NC533427	Ma,3
1587	795	Scotland	1053	522	Triuirebheinn	357	256	1,171	840	24C	31	NF812212	Ma,3
1588	1074	Scotland	1054	690	Wauk Hill	357	218	1,171	715	27C	78	NX841909	Ma,3
1589	1454	Wales	125	102	Mynydd Uchaf	357	182	1,171	597	32B	160	SN715103	Ma,3
1590	1956	Ireland	300	433	Knockanaskill	356	152	1,168	499	50B	78	V834717	Ma
1591	516	Ireland	301	105	Tully Mountain	356	320	1,168	1,050	47A	37	L672611	Ma
1592	990	Scotland	1055	641	Benarty Hill	356	228	1,168	748	26A	58	NT153978	Ma,3
1593	1620	Wales	126	119	Allt y Main	356	171	1,168	561	30E	125	SJ162151	Ma,3
1594	1817	Ireland	302	411	Milane Hill	354	159	1,163	522	52B	85 89	W168498	Ma
1595	694	Scotland	1056	461	Beinn Ghuilean	354	276	1,161	906	19B	68	NR729170	Ma,3
1596	1957	Scotland	1057	1197	Belling Hill	354	152	1,161	499	28B	80	NT642118	Ma,3
1597	1646	Wales	127	123	Caeliber Isaf	354	170	1,160	556	31B	137	SO211934	Ma,3
1598	1513	Ireland	303	342	Ballyarthur Hill	353	178	1,159	584	53A	73	R789177	Ma
1599	517	Ireland	304	106	Cnoc Mordain	353	320	1,158	1,050	47C	44	L864377	Ma
1600	1958	Ireland	305	434	Big Collin	353	152	1,158	499	43C	09 14	J232966	Ma
1601	1357	Ireland	306	307	Knocknabrone Hill	353	190	1,158	623	50A	78	V757868	Ma
1602	1331	Scotland	1058	842	Na Maoilean	353	193	1,157	633	03B	49	NM975372	Ma,3
1603	1561	England	109	122	Dent	352	175	1,155	574	34B	89	NY041129	Ma,3
1604	1577	Wales	128	117	Upper Park	352	174	1,155	571	31A	125	SJ189052	Ma,3
1605	1203	Ireland	307	269	Mulmosog Mountain	351	205	1,152	673	45C	10	G741867	Ma
1606	893	England	110	61	Longridge Fell	350	242	1,148	794	36	102 103	SD657410	Ma,3
1607	1592	Ireland	308	363	Crockmore	349	173	1,145	568	45B	02	C101259	Ma
1608	1027	Ireland	309	225	Clomantagh Hill	349	224	1,145	735	54B	60	S332655	Ma
1609	1300	Scotland	1059	821	Beinn Domhnaill	348	195	1,142	640	16D	21	NH679966	Ma,3
1610	452	Scotland	1060	313	Eabhal	347	347	1,138	1,138	24C	22	NF898605	Ma,3,SIB
1611	561	Ireland	310	112	Cnoc na Saileog	346	310	1,135	1,017	47C	45	M012397	Ma
1612	1777	Scotland	1061	1088	Creag a' Ghobhair	346	161	1,135	528	16D	21	NH659940	Ma,3
1613	958	Wales	129	62	Mynydd Carningli	346	232	1,135	761	31C	145	SN062372	Ma,3
1614	959	Scotland	1062	619	Ben Meabost	346	232	1,134	761	17B	32	NG536159	Ma,3
1615	1959	Ireland	311	435	Bolaght Mountain	345	152	1,132	499	44A	12	H259765	Ma
1616	1931	Ireland	312	425	Knockanimpaha	345	153	1,132	502	48B	64	R216336	Ma
1617	763	Ireland	313	171	Seefin	345	263	1,132	863	51B	88	V824397	Ma
1618	1960	Ireland	314	436	Seskin	344	152	1,129	499	55A	62	S960727	Ma
1619	677	Ireland	315	148	Slieve Elva	344	280	1,129	919	48A	51	M150044	Ma
1620	683	Scotland	1063	454	Beinn na Seilg	344	278	1,129	912	18A	47	NM458641	Ma,3
1621	991	Scotland	1064	642	Fourman Hill	344	228	1,129	748	21A	29	NJ570458	Ma,3
1622	1858	Scotland	1065	1136	White Top of Culreoch	344	157	1,129	515	27B	83	NX600633	Ma,3
1623	1535	England	111	118	The Cloud	343	177	1,125	581	36	118	SJ904637	Ma,3
1624	867	Ireland	316	192	Little Sugar Loaf	342	245	1,122	804	55B	56	O260144	Ma
1625	1724	Wales	130	129	Y Golfa	341	165	1,120	541	30E	125	SJ182070	Ma,3
1626	1678	Ireland	317	385	Dooish	341	168	1,119	551	44A	18	H315698	Ma
1627	1725	Wales	131	130	Mynydd-y-briw	341	165	1,119	541	30E	125	SJ174260	Ma,3
1628	1204	Ireland	318	270	Knocknamuck	340	205	1,115	673	54B	67	S317549	Ma
1629	658	Ireland	319	144	Tawnaghmore	340	284	1,115	932	46A	23	F959395	Ma
1630	755	Scotland	1066	499	Sgorr an Fharaidh	340	264	1,115	866	17D	39	NM485893	Ma,3
1631	469	Scotland	1067	321	Ailsa Craig	340	340	1,115	1,115	27B	76	NX019998	Ma,3,SIB
1632	1828	England	112	153	Lambrigg Fell	340	159	1,114	520	34D	97	SD586941	Ma,3
1633	929	Ireland	320	203	Cornasaus	339	236	1,112	774	56A	35	N721959	Ma
1634	1244	Scotland	1068	787	Brown Muir	339	201	1,112	659	09A	28	NJ258548	Ma,3
1635	1961	Scotland	1069	1198	Maol Ban	338	152	1,110	499	17E	49	NM683238	Ma,3
1636	1358	Wales	132	96	Mynydd Allt-y-grug	338	190	1,109	623	32B	160	SN750079	Ma,3
1637	780	Ireland	321	175	Knockmore	337	259	1,106	850	46C	30	L690994	Ma
1638	1915	England	113	166	Callow Hill	336	154	1,102	505	38A	137 138	SO460850	Ma,3
1639	812	Ireland	322	180	Gregory Hill	336	254	1,102	833	45B	06	C116124	Ma
1640	992	Ireland	323	215	Clogrennan Hill	336	228	1,102	748	54B	61	S668740	Ma
1641	1621	Scotland	1070	999	Meall nan Clach Ruadha	336	171	1,102	561	16C	10	NC605569	Ma,3
1642	1622	Scotland	1071	1000	Cipeagal Bheag	336	171	1,102	561	24A	13 14	NB247064	Ma,3
1643	1604	England	114	125	Loughrigg Fell	335	172	1,099	564	34B	90	NY346051	Ma,3,W,B,Sy,Fel
1644	1350	England	115	100	Top o' Selside	335	191	1,099	627	34D	96 97	SD308919	Ma,3,Sy
1645	1605	Ireland	324	368	Crocknamoghil	335	172	1,099	564	44B	13	H578851	Ma
1646	1272	Ireland	325	288	Slieve Fyagh	335	198	1,099	650	46A	23	F919299	Ma
1647	976	England	116	69	Kirkby Moor	334	230	1,096	755	34D	96	SD259839	Ma,3
1648	1623	England	117	128	Kit Hill	334	171	1,096	561	40	201	SX374713	Ma,3
1649	756	Ireland	326	169	Binn Mhor	333	264	1,093	866	47A	37	L795620	Ma
1650	1879	Scotland	1072	1148	Ghlas-bheinn	333	156	1,093	512	16A	9	NC332614	Ma,3
1651	1514	Ireland	327	343	Cnoc na Deirce Bige	332	178	1,089	584	45C	11	G829988	Ma
1652	1220	Scotland	1073	771	Cruach nam Fearna	332	204	1,089	669	19A	55	NM823151	Ma,3
1653	567	Scotland	1074	388	Beinn Tangabhal	332	308	1,089	1,010	24D	31	NL638990	Ma,3
1654	1109	Ireland	328	246	Killurly	331	214	1,086	702	50A	83	V406673	Ma
1655	1726	Scotland	1075	1060	Creachan Mor	331	165	1,086	541	17E	48	NM496195	Ma,3
1656	947	England	118	66	Cleeve Hill	330	234	1,083	768	39	163	SO996245	Ma,3,CoH,CoU,CoA
1657	1548	Ireland	329	352	Knockatee	330	176	1,083	577	51A	84	V775604	Ma
1658	1374	Wales	133	98	Hope Mountain	330	189	1,083	620	30C	117	SJ294568	Ma,3
1659	1859	England	119	159	Wapley Hill	329	157	1,079	515	38B	137 148 149	SO347624	Ma,3
1660	1339	Ireland	330	300	Slieve Alp	329	192	1,079	630	46B	23	F866131	Ma
1661	898	Scotland	1076	586	Beinn Bhreac	329	241	1,079	791	17A	23	NG253530	Ma,3
1662	1049	Wales	134	69	Mynydd Cynros	329	221	1,079	725	31C	146	SN620326	Ma,3
1663	1962	England	120	169	Gisborough Moor	328	152	1,076	499	37	94	NZ632124	Ma,3,CoU,CoA
1664	1079	Ireland	331	236	Crocknasmug	328	217	1,074	712	45A	03 04	C657439	Ma
1665	578	Ireland	332	114	Knocknarea	327	306	1,073	1,004	45E	16 25	G626345	Ma
1666	830	Scotland	1077	547	Feiriosbhal	327	251	1,073	823	24A	13 14	NB301146	Ma,3
1667	1734	Wales	135	132	Rhos Ymryson	327	164	1,073	538	31C	146	SN460500	Ma,3
1668	1606	England	121	126	Shobdon Hill	326	172	1,070	564	38B	137 148 149	SO381640	Ma,3
1669	1443	Ireland	333	327	Slievecarran	326	183	1,070	600	48A	52	M324054	Ma
1670	1056	Scotland	1078	678	Beinn Chreagach	326	220	1,070	722	17A	23	NG289534	Ma,3
1671	1430	Wales	136	100	Pen-crug-melyn	326	184	1,070	604	31C	146	SN502285	Ma,3
1672	920	England	122	64	Beacon Batch	325	237	1,066	778	41	172 182	ST484572	Ma,3
1673	1840	Scotland	1079	1126	Meall Dola	323	158	1,060	518	16D	16	NC619069	Ma,3
1674	1156	Ireland	334	257	Tristia	322	210	1,056	689	46B	23 31	G072095	Ma
1675	1578	Scotland	1080	975	Cnoc an t-Sabhail	322	174	1,056	571	15B	21	NH721817	Ma,3
1676	1080	England	123	77	Gummer's How	321	217	1,053	712	34D	96 97	SD390884	Ma,3,WO,B,Sy
1677	1692	England	124	137	View Edge	321	167	1,053	548	38A	137	SO422809	Ma,3
1678	1593	Ireland	335	364	Bricklieve Mountains	321	173	1,053	568	45E	25	G753117	Ma
1679	1708	Ireland	336	393	Crockdooish	321	166	1,053	545	44B	07	C529024	Ma
1680	1932	Ireland	337	426	Slievenaglogh	321	153	1,053	502	56A	36	J139089	Ma
1681	1933	Wales	137	152	Craig y Castell	321	153	1,053	502	30F	124	SH697161	Ma,3
1682	1229	Ireland	338	278	Slieve Glah	320	203	1,050	666	56B	34	H462007	Ma
1683	1735	Scotland	1081	1064	Bin of Cullen	320	164	1,050	538	21A	28 29	NJ479642	Ma,3
1684	1658	England	125	132	Long Crag	319	169	1,047	554	33	81	NU062069	Ma,3
1685	1999	Ireland	339	447	Carnearny	319	150	1,047	492	43C	14	J176927	Ma
1686	1860	Scotland	1082	1137	Hill of the Wangie	319	157	1,047	515	09A	28	NJ136537	Ma,3
1687	899	Scotland	1083	587	Beinn Bhan	319	241	1,047	791	19A	55	NR856998	Ma,3
1688	1916	Scotland	1084	1174	Grange Fell	319	154	1,047	505	28B	79	NY244819	Ma,3
1689	1205	Ireland	340	271	Leataoibh	318	205	1,043	673	49A	70	Q399034	Ma
1690	2000	Scotland	1085	1219	Giur-bheinn	318	150	1,043	492	20B	60 61	NR379728	Ma,3
1691	1727	England	126	140	Holme Fell	317	165	1,040	541	34D	90	NY315006	Ma,3,W,B,Sy,Fel
1692	1963	Ireland	341	437	Cullenagh Mountain	317	152	1,040	499	54B	60	S498895	Ma
1693	1134	Ireland	342	254	Brougher Mountain	317	212	1,040	696	44A	18	H349527	Ma
1694	1416	Scotland	1086	890	Newtyle Hill	317	185	1,040	607	06B	52 53	NO050418	Ma,3
1695	1934	Scotland	1087	1185	Mochrum Fell	317	153	1,040	502	27C	77 84	NX723750	Ma,3
1696	1157	England	127	83	Walton Hill	316	210	1,037	689	39	139	SO942798	Ma,3
1697	1041	England	128	73	Ros Hill	315	222	1,033	728	33	75	NU081253	Ma,3
1698	1135	England	129	82	Staple Hill	315	212	1,033	696	41	193	ST240166	Ma,3
1699	1762	Ireland	343	399	Cro Bheithe	315	162	1,033	531	45B	01	B827114	Ma
1700	1136	Ireland	344	255	Gibbet Hill	315	212	1,033	696	55A	68 69	S946591	Ma
1701	993	Ireland	345	216	Cnoc Fola	314	228	1,030	748	45B	01	B833322	Ma
1702	1659	Ireland	346	382	Carricktriss Gorse	314	169	1,030	554	54B	75	S483291	Ma
1703	2001	Ireland	347	448	Slievemore	314	150	1,030	492	44B	18	H593615	Ma
1704	1515	Scotland	1088	944	Biod an Athair	314	178	1,030	584	17A	23	NG158549	Ma,3
1705	1796	Scotland	1089	1099	Cnoc nam Broighleag	314	160	1,030	525	19A	55	NR940937	Ma,3
1706	541	Scotland	1090	370	Mullach Mor (Holy Island)	314	314	1,030	1,030	20C	69	NS063297	Ma,3,SIB
1707	1624	Scotland	1091	1001	Black Hill	314	171	1,030	561	28A	73 74	NT585370	Ma,3
1708	1974	Ireland	348	439	Knockmannon Hill	313	151	1,027	495	54B	60	S379710	Ma
1709	656	Ireland	349	142	Knocknamaddree	313	285	1,027	935	51B	88	V790298	Ma
1710	1057	Scotland	1092	679	Ben Bowie	313	220	1,027	722	01E	56	NS339828	Ma,3
1711	546	Scotland	1093	374	Beinn Chreagach	313	313	1,027	1,027	17E	47 48	NM403402	Ma,3,SIB
1712	831	Wales	138	49	Ffridd Cocyn	313	250	1,026	821	30F	135	SH624042	Ma,3
1713	1679	Ireland	350	386	Mouldy Hill	312	168	1,024	551	45A	02 07	C354288	Ma
1714	1562	Ireland	351	355	Tinoran Hill	312	175	1,024	574	55A	55	S852905	Ma
1715	1386	Ireland	352	313	Slievetrue	312	188	1,024	617	43C	15	J346891	Ma
1716	1728	Scotland	1094	1061	Cairnpapple Hill	312	165	1,024	541	28A	65	NS987711	Ma,3,CoH
1717	1179	Ireland	353	266	Carrigfadda	312	208	1,023	682	52B	86 89	W242430	Ma
1718	757	Ireland	354	170	Cashel Hill	310	264	1,017	866	47B	44	L800436	Ma
1719	846	Ireland	355	188	Woodcock Hill	310	248	1,017	814	48A	58	R522634	Ma
1720	1638	Ireland	356	378	Knockanuarha	309	170	1,014	558	48A	58	R535698	Ma
1721	882	Wales	139	52	Wentwood	309	243	1,014	797	32C	171 172	ST411943	Ma,3,CoU
1722	1332	England	130	97	Selworthy Beacon	308	193	1,010	633	41	181	SS918479	Ma,3
1723	1607	Ireland	357	369	Croslieve	308	172	1,010	564	43A	29 36	J002164	Ma
1724	1481	Ireland	358	333	An Bheann Mhor	308	180	1,010	591	50B	83 84	V655646	Ma
1725	1625	Scotland	1095	1002	Beinn Lora	308	171	1,010	561	03B	49	NM919377	Ma,3
1726	568	Scotland	1096	389	Sron Romul	308	308	1,010	1,010	24B	13	NA968158	Ma,3,SIB
1727	1145	Wales	140	76	Garth Hill	307	211	1,007	692	32C	171	ST103835	Ma,3,CoU
1728	1482	Ireland	359	334	Knockchree	306	180	1,004	591	43B	29	J271170	Ma
1729	768	Ireland	360	173	Keeraunnageeragh	305	262	1,001	860	47C	45	M050474	Ma
1730	2002	Wales	141	158	Mynydd y Cwm	305	150	1,000	492	30C	116	SJ073767	Ma,3
1731	1516	Ireland	361	344	Glinsk	304	178	997	584	46A	23	F948420	Ma
1732	1064	Scotland	1097	683	Mullach Mor (Rum)	304	219	997	719	17D	32 39	NG386015	Ma,3
1733	1496	Scotland	1098	931	Cruach na Seilcheig	304	179	997	587	20A	55 61	NR678984	Ma,3
1734	905	Wales	142	54	Mynydd Rhiw	304	240	997	787	30A	123	SH228293	Ma,3
1735	1563	Scotland	1099	968	Tom an t-Saighdeir	303	175	994	574	19A	55	NM971152	Ma,3
1736	1375	Scotland	1100	860	Cnoc an Ime	303	189	994	620	20A	61	NR590801	Ma,3
1737	652	Ireland	362	140	Carronadavderg	301	286	988	938	54A	82	X174870	Ma
1738	1517	Ireland	363	345	Derrylahard East	301	178	988	584	51B	85 88	V983411	Ma
1739	847	Scotland	1101	555	Beinn nan Carn	301	248	988	814	17C	32	NG636180	Ma,3
1740	684	Ireland	364	150	Iorras Beag	300	278	984	912	47B	44	L697401	Ma
1741	789	England	131	49	Bredon Hill	299	257	981	843	39	150	SO957402	Ma,2
1742	695	Scotland	1102	462	Sgorach Breac	299	276	981	906	17C	32	NG651132	Ma,2
1743	1431	Ireland	365	323	Pollnalaght	298	184	978	604	44A	12	H369701	Ma
1744	1455	England	132	111	Periton Hill	297	182	974	597	41	181	SS946441	Ma,2
1745	1387	England	133	106	Walbury Hill	297	188	974	617	42	174	SU373616	Ma,2,CoH,CoU,CoA
1746	1917	Scotland	1103	1175	Grey Hill	297	154	974	505	27B	76	NX164927	Ma,2
1747	1376	Ireland	366	310	Cashloura	297	189	974	620	52B	85 89	W209485	Ma
1748	1081	England	134	78	May Hill	296	217	971	712	38B	162	SO695212	Ma,2
1749	1778	Scotland	1104	1089	An Cuaidh	296	161	971	528	13A	19	NG765891	Ma,2
1750	1594	Ireland	367	365	Coolsnaghtig	296	173	970	568	52B	85	W206550	Ma
1751	862	England	135	55	Leith Hill	295	246	968	807	42	187	TQ139431	Ma,2,CoH,CoU,CoA
1752	1318	Scotland	1105	834	Cruachan-Glen Vic Askill	295	194	968	636	17A	23	NG357460	Ma,2
1753	1935	Scotland	1106	1186	'S Airde Beinn	295	153	968	502	17E	47	NM470536	Ma,2
1754	1292	England	136	90	Burton Hill	294	196	965	643	38B	148 149	SO394487	Ma,2
1755	1660	Scotland	1107	1020	Meall an Fhithich	294	169	965	554	19A	50	NN059267	Ma,2
1756	994	Ireland	368	217	Killerry Mountain	293	228	961	748	45D	25	G751317	Ma
1757	648	Scotland	1108	433	Royl Field	293	287	961	942	22	4	HU395285	Ma,2
1758	632	Ireland	369	133	An Cro Mor	292	292	958	958	49A	70	V246958	Ma
1759	1680	Ireland	370	387	Tory Hill	292	168	958	551	54B	75 76	S595222	Ma
1760	868	Scotland	1109	569	Cruach Doir'an Raoigh	292	245	958	804	10D	40	NM734826	Ma,2
1761	1497	Scotland	1110	932	Sgurr na h-Iolaire	292	179	958	587	17C	32	NG617090	Ma,2
1762	804	Scotland	1111	530	Beinn Mholach	292	255	958	837	24A	8	NB355387	Ma,2
1763	1736	Wales	143	133	Myarth	292	164	958	538	32A	161	SO170208	Ma,2
1764	1681	Ireland	371	388	Coolcross Hill	291	168	955	551	45A	03	C404469	Ma
1765	1579	England	137	123	Ruardean Hill	290	174	951	571	38B	162	SO634169	Ma,2
1766	1284	Scotland	1112	811	Largo Law	290	197	951	646	26A	59	NO427049	Ma,2
1767	1626	England	138	129	Long Knoll	288	171	945	561	41	183	ST786376	Ma,2
1768	1483	Ireland	372	335	Knockfeerina	288	180	945	591	48B	65	R451361	Ma
1769	1897	Scotland	1113	1161	Druim na h-Earba	288	155	945	509	04A	41	NN090713	Ma,2
1770	1779	Scotland	1114	1090	Beinn Akie	288	161	945	528	16A	9	NC340650	Ma,2
1771	1193	Wales	144	81	Gamallt	288	206	945	676	30F	124	SH665067	Ma,2
1772	981	Scotland	1115	636	Brown Carrick Hill	288	229	943	751	27A	70	NS283159	Ma,2
1773	1377	Scotland	1116	861	Bainloch Hill	287	189	942	620	27C	84	NX893570	Ma,2
1774	836	Ireland	373	186	Tievereivagh	286	250	938	820	46C	30	L710957	Ma
1775	775	Ireland	374	174	Knocknanacree	286	260	938	853	49B	70	V572998	Ma
1776	1818	Ireland	375	412	Sliabh an tSratha Greadaithe	285	159	935	522	45B	02	C082245	Ma
1777	1167	Scotland	1117	745	Norman's Law	285	209	935	686	26A	53 59	NO305202	Ma,2
1778	1549	Ireland	376	353	Mongorry Hill	284	176	932	577	45A	06	C242050	Ma
1779	1709	Scotland	1118	1048	Ben Geary	284	166	932	545	17A	23	NG253614	Ma,2
1780	1898	Scotland	1119	1162	Meall a' Mhaoil	284	155	932	509	17B	24 32	NG553307	Ma,2
1781	659	Scotland	1120	438	Saxa Vord	284	284	932	932	22	1	HP631166	Ma,2,SIB
1782	1168	Wales	145	77	Mynydd Sylen	284	209	932	686	32B	159	SN515080	Ma,2
1783	720	Scotland	1121	480	Fitful Head	283	270	928	886	22	4	HU346135	Ma,2
1784	738	Ireland	377	162	Crockalough	282	266	925	873	45A	03	C460567	Ma
1785	1550	Scotland	1122	960	Linton Hill	282	176	925	577	28B	74	NT787279	Ma,2
1786	1092	Scotland	1123	701	Sgurr nan Caorach	281	216	923	709	17C	32 39	NG593030	Ma,2
1787	739	Scotland	1124	490	Scalla Field	281	266	922	873	22	2 3	HU389572	Ma,2
1788	1230	Scotland	1125	776	Roineabhal	281	203	922	666	24A	13 14	NB232212	Ma,2
1789	696	Scotland	1126	463	Li a' Deas	281	275	922	902	24C	18	NF918653	Ma,2
1790	1351	England	139	101	Black Down	280	191	919	627	42	186 197	SU919296	Ma,2,CoH,CoU,CoA
1791	1737	Ireland	378	395	Barranisky	280	164	919	538	55B	62	T256790	Ma
1792	2003	Ireland	379	449	Slievenalargy	280	150	919	492	43B	29	J297355	Ma
1793	1319	Scotland	1127	835	Greabhal	280	194	919	636	24B	18	NG003891	Ma,2
1794	1417	England	140	108	Lewesdon Hill	279	185	915	607	41	193	ST437011	Ma,2,CoH,CoU,CoA
1795	2004	Ireland	380	450	Lettertrask	279	150	915	492	46B	23 31	F971095	Ma
1796	1763	Scotland	1128	1080	Knock of Crieff	279	162	915	531	01A	52 58	NN873233	Ma,2
1797	1551	Wales	146	115	Garn Boduan	279	176	915	577	30A	123	SH312393	Ma,2
1798	1639	England	141	130	Bardon Hill	278	170	912	558	39	129	SK459131	Ma,2,CoH,CoU,CoA
1799	805	Ireland	381	177	Killelan Mountain	278	255	912	837	50A	83	V415808	Ma
1800	1183	Ireland	382	267	Corn Hill	278	207	912	679	45D	34	N187842	Ma,CoH,CoU
1801	685	Scotland	1129	455	Windy Hill	278	278	912	912	19C	63	NS043698	Ma,2,SIB
1802	1819	England	142	151	Win Green	277	159	909	522	41	184	ST925206	Ma,2
1803	1065	Scotland	1130	684	Hill of Garvock	277	219	909	719	07B	45	NO726691	Ma,2
1804	1861	England	143	160	Aconbury Hill	276	157	906	515	38B	149	SO505329	Ma,2
1805	1564	Ireland	383	356	Knocknashee	276	175	906	574	45E	25	G556191	Ma
1806	1518	Ireland	384	346	Slieve na Calliagh	276	178	906	584	56B	42	N586775	Ma,CoH,CoU
1807	1640	Scotland	1131	1007	Beinn Ruigh Choinnich	276	170	906	558	24C	31	NF806196	Ma,2
1808	1468	Scotland	1132	918	Tom nam Fitheach	276	181	904	594	17E	47 48	NM469484	Ma,2
1809	1536	England	144	119	Hutton Roof Crags	275	177	902	581	34D	97	SD556775	Ma,2
1810	1641	Ireland	385	379	Curra Hill	275	170	902	558	50A	78	V654903	Ma
1811	1082	Ireland	386	237	Slieve Daeane	275	217	902	712	45D	25	G711299	Ma
1812	697	Scotland	1133	464	Mid Hill	275	275	902	902	23	6 7	HY335087	Ma,2,SIB
1813	1841	Ireland	387	419	Rinn Chonaill	274	158	899	518	49A	70	Q413068	Ma
1814	1975	Ireland	388	440	Corronoher	273	151	896	495	48B	65	R409310	Ma
1815	705	Scotland	1134	470	Càrnan	273	273	896	896	24D	31	NL552828	Ma,2,SIB
1816	1918	Wales	147	151	Craig yr Allt	273	154	896	505	32C	171	ST133850	Ma,2
1817	1693	England	145	138	Seager Hill	272	167	892	548	38B	149	SO613389	Ma,2
1818	1627	Wales	148	120	Mynydd Drumau	272	171	892	561	32B	170	SN725001	Ma,2
1819	1537	England	146	120	Claife Heights	270	177	886	581	34D	96 97	SD382973	Ma,2,WO
1820	1842	England	147	156	Butser Hill	270	158	886	518	42	197	SU716203	Ma,2
1821	1169	England	148	84	Botley Hill	270	209	885	686	42	187	TQ387551	Ma,2
1822	1797	Ireland	389	409	Carrafull	269	160	883	525	46A	23	F870246	Ma
1823	1738	Scotland	1135	1065	Cnoc Mor	269	164	883	538	15B	26	NH490569	Ma,2
1824	1359	Ireland	390	308	Slievecoiltia	269	190	881	623	54B	76	S727213	Ma
1825	1432	England	149	110	Housedon Hill	268	184	879	604	33	74 75	NT902327	Ma,2
1826	1484	England	150	115	Wendover Woods	267	180	876	591	39	165	SP890090	Ma,2,CoH,CoU,CoA
1827	732	Ireland	391	159	Knockanallig	267	267	876	876	51A	84 88	V703431	Ma
1828	733	Scotland	1136	489	Beinn Ra	267	267	876	876	24B	18	NB034019	Ma,2,SIB
1829	1301	Ireland	392	293	Cruach Leac Chonaill	266	195	873	640	45C	11	B841057	Ma
1830	1608	Ireland	393	370	Dooish Mountain	266	172	873	564	45A	06 07	C300107	Ma
1831	740	Ireland	394	163	Geokaun	266	266	873	873	50A	83	V386770	Ma
1832	1820	Scotland	1137	1116	Brimmond Hill	266	159	873	522	21B	38	NJ856091	Ma,2,CoU
1833	912	Ireland	395	201	Knockanore	266	238	871	781	48B	63	Q910425	Ma
1834	758	Scotland	1138	500	Beinn a' Bhaillidh	265	264	869	866	18A	40	NM649741	Ma,2,SIB
1835	1075	Scotland	1139	691	Cnoc Reamhar	265	218	869	715	19B	55	NR766912	Ma,2
1836	1245	Scotland	1140	788	Knockdolian	265	201	869	659	27B	76	NX113848	Ma,2
1837	906	Ireland	396	197	Barr na Coilleadh	264	240	866	787	46A	22	F810375	Ma
1838	1710	Ireland	397	394	Tievecrom	263	166	863	545	43A	29 36	J023153	Ma
1839	966	Scotland	1141	624	Ardsheal Hill	263	231	863	758	03B	49	NM995568	Ma,2
1840	1711	Scotland	1142	1049	Ward of Scousburgh	263	166	863	545	22	4	HU387188	Ma,2
1841	1565	Scotland	1143	969	Li a' Tuath	263	175	863	574	24C	18	NF926660	Ma,2
1842	930	Wales	149	58	Moel y Gest	263	236	863	774	30A	124	SH549388	Ma,2
1843	1609	Wales	150	118	Mynydd Llangyndeyrn	263	172	863	564	32B	159	SN482132	Ma,2
1844	1273	Ireland	398	289	Slieve Carn	262	198	860	650	45E	31	M297881	Ma
1845	1821	Ireland	399	413	Curlew Mountain	262	159	860	522	45E	33	G749048	Ma
1846	1206	Ireland	400	272	Slieve Bawn	262	205	860	673	45D	40	M954743	Ma
1847	1982	Scotland	1144	1208	Beinn Bhragair	262	151	859	495	24A	8	NB266432	Ma,2
1848	1595	England	151	124	Christ Cross	261	173	856	568	40	192	SS964052	Ma,2
1849	1919	Scotland	1145	1176	Creag an Amalaidh	261	154	856	505	16D	21	NH758975	Ma,2
1850	863	Ireland	401	191	Holywell Hill	260	246	853	807	44B	07	C385171	Ma
1851	1764	Ireland	402	400	Lackacroghan	260	162	853	531	51A	84	V543420	Ma
1852	1433	Ireland	403	324	Bruse Hill	260	184	853	604	45D	34	N317981	Ma
1853	1942	Wales	151	154	Mynydd Dinas	258	153	847	500	32C	170	SS761915	Ma,2
1854	1712	Scotland	1146	1050	Woodhead Hill	258	166	846	545	27C	84	NX927713	Ma,2
1855	1552	Scotland	1147	961	Airneabhal	257	176	843	577	24C	22	NF785256	Ma,2
1856	1028	Scotland	1148	663	Mount Eagle	256	224	840	735	15B	26	NH648590	Ma,2
1857	1146	Scotland	1149	731	Conostom	256	211	840	692	24A	13	NB166299	Ma,2
1858	1862	England	152	161	Hegdon Hill	255	157	837	515	38B	149	SO585539	Ma,2
1859	1050	Ireland	404	230	An Bhinn Bhui	255	221	837	725	46A	22	F815443	Ma
1860	1863	England	153	162	Watch Hill	254	157	833	515	34A	89	NY159318	Ma,2,WO
1861	1694	Scotland	1150	1038	Burgiehill	254	167	833	548	09A	27	NJ097559	Ma,2
1862	1378	Scotland	1151	862	Beinn na h-Iolaire	254	189	833	620	17A	24	NG599502	Ma,2
1863	1013	England	154	72	Watch Croft	253	226	830	741	40	203	SW420356	Ma,2
1864	1258	Ireland	405	284	Tara Hill	253	200	830	656	55A	62	T205623	Ma
1865	1729	England	155	141	Carnmenellis	252	165	827	541	40	203	SW695364	Ma,2
1866	854	Ireland	406	189	Croaghnamaddy	252	247	827	810	45B	02	C029402	Ma
1867	821	Ireland	407	181	Scarriff Island	252	252	827	827	50B	84	V443552	Ma
1868	822	Ireland	408	182	Cnoc Bolais	252	252	827	827	51A	84	V472403	Ma
1869	1110	Scotland	1152	711	Torr Achilty	252	214	827	702	12A	26	NH447550	Ma,2
1870	1083	Scotland	1153	695	Cruach Lerags	252	217	827	712	19A	49	NM838257	Ma,2
1871	1231	Scotland	1154	777	Dalescord Hill	252	203	827	666	22	2 3	HU393684	Ma,2
1872	1498	Scotland	1155	933	Turin Hill	252	179	827	587	26A	54	NO514535	Ma,2
1873	1029	Ireland	409	226	Ceann Bhaile Dhaith	251	224	825	735	49A	70	Q387112	Ma
1874	1566	Ireland	410	357	Mount Oriel	251	175	823	574	56A	36	N981832	Ma
1875	1580	Scotland	1156	976	Arthur's Seat	251	174	823	571	28A	66	NT275729	Ma,2
1876	1320	Ireland	411	295	Binnion	250	194	820	636	45A	03	C369489	Ma
1877	837	Scotland	1157	550	Blotchnie Fiold	250	250	820	820	23	5 6	HY418289	Ma,2,SIB
1878	1765	Scotland	1158	1081	Hightown Hill	250	162	820	531	27C	78	NY035835	Ma,2
1879	948	Scotland	1159	613	Sandness Hill	249	234	817	768	22	3	HU191557	Ma,2
1880	1207	England	156	87	Bishop Wilton Wold	248	205	814	673	37	106	SE821570	Ma,2,CoH,CoU,CoA
1881	1111	England	157	80	Ditchling Beacon	248	214	814	702	42	198	TQ331130	Ma,2,CoH,CoU,CoA
1882	950	Scotland	1160	614	Carn Ban	248	233	814	764	17E	49	NM721289	Ma,2
1883	1499	Scotland	1161	934	Da Noup	248	179	814	587	22	4	HT954375	Ma,2
1884	1642	Scotland	1162	1008	Muirneag	248	170	814	558	24A	8	NB479489	Ma,2
1885	1751	Scotland	1163	1073	Sleteachal Mhor	248	163	814	535	24A	13 14	NB213187	Ma,2
1886	1119	Ireland	412	248	Croaghegly	245	213	804	699	45C	01	B736072	Ma
1887	1964	England	158	170	Swinside	244	152	801	499	34B	89 90	NY243224	Ma,2
1888	960	Ireland	413	209	Knocknascollop NW Top	244	232	801	761	46A	22	F801297	Ma
1889	1221	Ireland	414	276	Bunmore	243	204	797	669	46B	22	F814115	Ma
1890	908	Scotland	1164	592	Easabhal	243	239	797	784	24C	31	NF773158	Ma,2
1891	1822	England	159	152	Crowborough	242	159	794	522	42	188 199	TQ510306	Ma,2
1892	894	England	160	62	St Boniface Down	242	242	794	794	42	196	SZ568785	Ma,2,CoH,CoU,CoA,SIB
1893	1739	Ireland	415	396	Mullaghcroy	242	164	794	538	44A	12	H329818	Ma
1894	1084	England	161	79	Chanctonbury Ring	240	217	787	712	42	198	TQ138120	Ma,2
1895	1740	Ireland	416	397	Abbey Hill	240	164	787	538	48A	51	M300103	Ma
1896	1936	Scotland	1165	1187	Beinn Bhreac	240	153	787	502	18A	40	NM681715	Ma,2
1897	1976	Scotland	1166	1206	See Morris Hill	240	151	787	495	27C	84	NX902779	Ma,2
1898	1968	Scotland	1167	1201	Killyleoch Hill	240	152	786	497	27C	78	NX878820	Ma,2
1899	1259	Ireland	417	285	Bray Head	239	200	784	656	50A	83	V333736	Ma
1900	1485	Ireland	418	336	Collon Hill	238	180	781	591	55B	62	T303867	Ma
1901	1340	Ireland	419	301	Knockaghaleague	237	192	778	630	46A	23	G117348	Ma
1902	1341	Ireland	420	302	Forth Mountain	237	192	778	630	54B	77	S980192	Ma
1903	1581	Ireland	421	362	Knockaphuca	237	174	778	571	51B	88	V823307	Ma
1904	1864	Wales	152	142	Carneddol	235	157	771	515	30A	123	SH301330	Ma,2
1905	2005	Ireland	422	451	Carrickbyrne Hill	234	150	768	492	54B	76	S830249	Ma
1906	1977	Ireland	423	441	Mullaghanoe	234	151	768	495	45E	32	M524990	Ma
1907	1469	Scotland	1168	919	Waughton Hill	234	181	768	594	21B	30	NJ963572	Ma,2
1908	1643	England	162	131	Dundry Down	233	170	764	558	41	172 182	ST553667	Ma,2
1909	1293	Isle of Man	4	3	Bradda Hill	233	196	764	643	29	95	SC194711	Ma,2
1910	1302	England	163	93	Muncaster Fell	232	195	761	640	34D	96	SD115986	Ma,2
1911	1333	Ireland	424	298	Carrigroe Hill	232	193	761	633	55A	69	T093497	Ma
1912	1158	Ireland	425	258	Dunaff Hill	232	210	761	689	45A	02 03	C308486	Ma
1913	1519	Ireland	426	347	Mizen Peak	232	178	761	584	51B	88	V745247	Ma
1914	1002	Scotland	1169	649	Beinn Tart a' Mhill	232	227	761	745	20B	60	NR210569	Ma,2
1915	1042	Scotland	1170	670	Maireabhal	230	222	755	728	24C	18	NF808700	Ma,2
1916	1321	Ireland	427	296	Barr an Digin	229	194	751	636	46A	23	F868431	Ma
1917	1992	Scotland	1171	1216	Cairnie Hill	229	150	751	493	26A	59	NO279154	Ma,2
1918	2006	Ireland	428	452	Currane Hill	228	150	748	492	52B	86 89	W338502	Ma
1919	1766	Scotland	1172	1082	Coltraiseal Mor	228	162	748	531	24A	13 14	NB158228	Ma,2
1920	1003	Ireland	429	218	Cnoc an Iolair - Mullach Thiar	227	227	745	745	45B	01	B653157	Ma
1921	1232	Ireland	430	279	Cnoc na Boirne	227	203	745	666	45B	02	C214424	Ma
1922	1014	Scotland	1173	656	Ward of Bressay	226	226	741	741	22	4	HU502387	Ma,2,SIB
1923	1661	Scotland	1174	1021	Wideford Hill	225	169	738	554	23	6	HY411116	Ma,2
1924	1388	Scotland	1175	868	Milldoe - Mid Tooin	224	188	735	617	23	6	HY358207	Ma,2
1925	1407	Scotland	1176	883	Moncreiffe Hill	223	186	732	610	26A	58	NO135199	Ma,2
1926	1434	Ireland	431	325	Clondermot Hill	221	184	725	604	44B	07	C434127	Ma
1927	1780	Scotland	1177	1091	Keelylang Hill	221	161	725	528	23	6	HY378102	Ma,2
1928	1752	Scotland	1178	1074	Mount Hill	221	163	725	535	26A	59	NO330164	Ma,2
1929	1058	Ireland	432	233	Inch Top	220	220	722	722	45A	02 07	C313252	Ma
1930	1059	Scotland	1179	680	Ward Hill	220	220	722	722	22	4	HZ208733	Ma,2,SIB
1931	1060	Wales	153	70	Holyhead Mountain	220	220	722	722	30A	114	SH218829	Ma,2,CoH,CoU,SIB
1932	1610	Ireland	433	371	Gortmonly Hill	218	172	715	564	44B	07	C396080	Ma
1933	1294	England	164	91	Firle Beacon	217	196	712	643	42	198	TQ485059	Ma,2
1934	1628	Ireland	434	374	Croaghan Hill	217	171	712	561	45A	06 12	H299974	Ma
1935	1170	Ireland	435	262	Maulin Mountain	217	209	712	686	48B	63	Q722304	Ma
1936	1085	Ireland	436	238	Sceilg Mhicil	217	217	712	712	50A	83	V246606	Ma
1937	1086	Scotland	1180	696	Eilean Shiophoirt	217	217	712	712	24A	13 14	NB207110	Ma,2,SIB
1938	1991	Scotland	1181	1215	Lamberton Hill	217	151	712	494	28A	67 74 75	NT944586	Ma,2
1939	1520	Scotland	1182	945	Scrae Field	216	178	709	584	22	4	HU417361	Ma,2
1940	1246	Scotland	1183	789	Valla Field	216	201	709	659	22	1	HP584078	Ma,2
1941	1456	England	165	112	Whitbarrow - Lord's Seat	215	182	705	597	34D	97	SD441870	Ma,2,WO
1942	2007	England	166	173	Brighstone Down	214	150	702	492	42	196	SZ432847	Ma,2
1943	1342	England	167	98	Wilmington Hill	214	192	702	630	42	199	TQ548034	Ma,2
1944	1389	Ireland	437	314	Cairngaver	214	188	702	617	43B	15	J454765	Ma,CoU
1945	1781	Ireland	438	402	Krinnuck	214	161	702	528	46C	22 30	F680078	Ma
1946	1147	Scotland	1184	732	Carn a' Ghaill	211	211	692	692	17D	39	NG263064	Ma,2,SIB
1947	1159	Scotland	1185	740	Hill of Arisdale	210	210	689	689	22	1 2 3	HU494841	Ma,2,SIB
1948	1247	Wales	154	88	Great Orme	207	201	679	659	30C	115	SH767833	Ma,2
1949	1920	England	168	167	Hardown Hill	207	154	679	505	41	193	SY405942	Ma,2
1950	1274	Ireland	439	290	Gainne Mor	207	198	679	650	45B	02	C111400	Ma
1951	1184	Scotland	1186	751	Carn Ghaltair	207	207	679	679	24D	31	NL640915	Ma,2,SIB
1952	2008	Ireland	440	453	Cross Slieve	206	150	676	492	43C	05	D236295	Ma
1953	1275	Ireland	441	291	Ceann Sibeal	206	198	676	650	49A	70	Q314063	Ma
1954	1823	Scotland	1187	1117	Beinn Chliad	206	159	676	522	24D	31	NF677042	Ma,2
1955	1937	Wales	155	153	Brandy Hill	206	153	676	502	31C	158	SN213133	Ma,2
1956	1538	Ireland	442	349	Disert	205	177	673	581	51A	84	V653427	Ma
1957	1334	Scotland	1188	843	Hill of Nigg	205	193	673	633	15B	21	NH820705	Ma,2
1958	1741	Scotland	1189	1066	Forsnabhal	205	164	673	538	24A	13	NB061358	Ma,2
1959	1521	Scotland	1190	946	Meall an Fheadain	204	178	669	584	16F	15	NB998109	Ma,2
1960	1539	Scotland	1191	955	Beinn Mhor	202	177	663	581	20B	60	NR294404	Ma,2
1961	1965	Scotland	1192	1199	Roineabhal	201	152	659	499	24C	31	NF816140	Ma,2
1962	1938	England	169	168	Nine Barrow Down	200	153	656	502	41	195	SZ008812	Ma,2
1963	1753	England	170	145	Detling Hill	200	163	656	535	42	178 188	TQ804586	Ma,2
1964	1260	Ireland	443	286	An Tiaracht	200	200	656	656	49A	70	V181949	Ma
1965	1978	Ireland	444	442	Carranarah	197	151	646	495	45E	31	G285029	Ma
1966	1522	Ireland	445	348	Knockomagh	197	178	646	584	51B	89	W088292	Ma
1967	1742	Scotland	1193	1067	Sgurr na Dubh-chreige	197	164	646	538	10D	40	NM690937	Ma,1
1968	1295	Scotland	1194	818	Beinn a' Charnain	196	196	643	643	24C	18	NF893884	Ma,1,SIB
1969	1296	Scotland	1195	819	Stac an Armin	196	196	643	643	25	18	NA151064	Ma,1
1970	1303	Scotland	1196	822	Sron an Duin	195	195	640	640	24D	31	NL548802	Ma,1,SIB
1971	1767	Scotland	1197	1083	Beinn Mhor	194	162	636	531	19A	49	NM798215	Ma,1
1972	1979	Wales	156	156	Mynydd Anelog	191	151	628	495	30A	123	SH151272	Ma,1
1973	1824	Scotland	1198	1118	Beinn Bhreac	191	159	627	522	24A	14	NB406121	Ma,1
1974	1418	Scotland	1199	891	Beinn Mhor	190	185	623	607	24C	18	NF897761	Ma,1
1975	1360	Scotland	1200	851	Heiseabhal Mor	190	190	623	623	24D	31	NL626963	Ma,1,SIB
1976	1362	Ireland	446	309	Inishturk	189	189	621	621	47A	37	L605751	Ma
1977	1379	Scotland	1201	863	Carn Breugach	189	189	620	620	19A	49	NM815278	Ma,1,SIB
1978	2009	England	171	174	Cheriton Hill	188	150	617	492	42	179 189	TR197396	Ma,1
1979	1682	Scotland	1202	1031	North Berwick Law	187	168	614	551	28A	66	NT556842	Ma,1
1980	1408	Scotland	1203	884	Beinn Sciathan	186	186	610	610	24C	31	NF795112	Ma,1,SIB
1981	1644	Ireland	447	380	Carhoo Hill	184	170	604	558	49A	70	V437983	Ma
1982	1754	Scotland	1204	1075	Cairn Pat	182	163	597	535	27B	82	NX044563	Ma,1
1983	1843	Scotland	1205	1127	Airds Hill	181	158	594	518	03B	49	NM925458	Ma,1
1984	1470	Scotland	1206	920	Noss Head	181	181	594	594	22	4	HU553398	Ma,1,SIB
1985	1662	Scotland	1207	1022	Crogearraidh Mor	180	169	591	554	24C	18	NF867731	Ma,1
1986	1899	England	172	164	Billinge Hill	179	155	587	509	36	108	SD525014	Ma,1,CoU,CoA
1987	1523	Scotland	1208	947	Bioda Mor	178	178	584	584	25	18	NF104973	Ma,1,SIB
1988	1524	Wales	157	110	Mynydd Bodafon	178	178	584	584	30A	114	SH472854	Ma,1,SIB
1989	1567	Ireland	448	358	Inis na Bro	175	175	574	574	49A	70	V212930	Ma
1990	1900	Scotland	1209	1163	White Grunafirth	173	155	568	509	22	3	HU275807	Ma,1
1991	1611	Ireland	449	372	Inis Tuaisceart	172	172	564	564	49A	70	Q233008	Ma
1992	2010	Ireland	450	454	Maumfin	172	150	564	492	47A	37	L646588	Ma
1993	1612	Scotland	1210	993	Mid Ward	172	172	564	564	22	3	HU320652	Ma,1,SIB
1994	1613	Scotland	1211	994	Stac Lee	172	172	564	564	25	18	NA142049	Ma,1
1995	1695	Ireland	451	390	Ben of Howth	171	167	561	548	56A	50	O285376	Ma
1996	1629	Scotland	1212	1003	An Tobha	171	171	561	561	24D	31	NL593872	Ma,1,SIB
1997	1645	Scotland	1213	1009	Cruachan Charna	170	170	558	558	18C	49	NM618589	Ma,1,SIB
1998	1980	Isle of Man	5	5	Mull Hill	169	151	554	495	29	95	SC189676	Ma,1
1999	1663	Scotland	1214	1023	Fitty Hill	169	169	554	554	23	5	HY429448	Ma,1,SIB
2000	1768	England	173	146	Normanby Top	168	162	551	531	37	113	TF121964	Ma,1,CoH,CoU,CoA
2001	1683	Wales	158	126	Mynydd Enlli	168	168	551	551	30A	123	SH123219	Ma,1,SIB
2002	2011	England	174	175	Cliffe Hill	164	150	538	492	42	198	TQ434107	Ma,1
2003	1825	Ireland	452	414	Cnoc na Slea	163	159	535	522	45B	02	C123429	Ma
2004	1798	Ireland	453	410	Cnoicin an tSeabhaic	160	160	525	525	51B	88	V972220	Ma
2005	1799	Scotland	1215	1100	Mullach Buidhe	160	160	525	525	24A	14	NG414986	Ma,1,SIB
2006	1985	England	175	172	Arnside Knott	159	151	522	495	34D	97	SD456774	Ma,1
2007	1826	Ireland	454	415	Puffin Island	159	159	522	522	50A	83	V339677	Ma
2008	1827	Scotland	1216	1119	Vord Hill	159	159	522	522	22	1 2	HU622935	Ma,1,SIB
2009	1901	Scotland	1217	1164	Gometra	155	155	509	509	17E	47 48	NM361414	Ma,1,SIB
2010	1966	Scotland	1218	1200	Crogearraidh na Thobha	154	152	505	499	24C	18	NF974724	Ma,1
2011	1921	Scotland	1219	1177	Maol Domhnaich	154	154	505	505	24D	31	NL688940	Ma,1,SIB

== Bibliography ==
- Alan Dawson (1997). The Hewitts and Marilyns of Wales. TACit Press. ISBN 0-9522680-6-X.
- Clem Clements (1998). The Hewitts and Marilyns of Ireland. TACit Press. ISBN 0-9522680-8-6.
- Alan Dawson (1997). The Hewitts and Marilyns of England. TACit Press. ISBN 0-9522680-7-8.
- Alan Dawson (1992). The Relative Hills of Britain. Cicerone Press. ISBN 978-1852840686.

== DoBIH codes ==
The DoBIH uses the following codes for the various classifications of mountains and hills in the British Isles, which many of the above peaks also fall into:

- Ma Marilyn
- Hu HuMP
- Sim Simm
- 5 Dodd
- M Munro
- MT Munro Top
- F Furth
- C Corbett
- G Graham
- D Donald
- DT Donald Top
- Hew Hewitt
- N Nuttall
- Dew Dewey
- DDew Donald Dewey
- HF Highland Five
- 4 400-499m Tump
- 3 300-399m Tump (GB)
- 2 200-299m Tump (GB)
- 1 100-199m Tump (GB)
- 0 0-99m Tump (GB)
- W Wainwright
- WO Wainwright Outlying Fell
- B Birkett
- Sy Synge
- Fel Fellranger
- CoH County Top – Historic (pre-1974)
- CoA County Top – Administrative (1974 to mid-1990s)
- CoU County Top – Current County or Unitary Authority
- CoL County Top – Current London Borough
- SIB Significant Island of Britain
- Dil Dillon
- A Arderin
- VL Vandeleur-Lynam
- MDew Myrddyn Dewey
- O Other list (which includes):
  - Bin Binnion
  - Bg Bridge
  - BL Buxton & Lewis
  - Ca Carn
  - CT Corbett Top
  - GT Graham Top
  - Mur Murdo
  - P500 P500
  - P600 P600
- Un unclassified

prefixes:
- s sub
- x deleted

suffixes:
= twin

== See also ==
- Lists of mountains and hills in the British Isles
- List of mountains of the British Isles by height
- Lists of mountains and hills in the British Isles
- Lists of mountains in Ireland
- List of Munro mountains
- List of Murdo mountains
- List of Furth mountains in the British Isles
- List of P600 mountains in the British Isles
