= Càrn Dearg =

Carn Dearg (Gaelic for red cairn) is the name of several mountains in Scotland:

- Càrn Dearg, a 1,221 m (4,006 ft) peak NW of Ben Nevis
- Càrn Dearg (Ben Alder), a 1,034 m (3,392 ft) Munro north of Ben Alder
- Càrn Dearg, a 1,020 m (3,350 ft) peak SW of Ben Nevis
- Càrn Dearg (Monadh Liath), a 945 m (3,100 ft) Munro, the highest point in the Monadh Liath
- Càrn Dearg (Corrour), a 941 m (3,087 ft) Munro southeast of Loch Ossian
- Càrn Dearg (East of Glen Roy), an 834 m (2,736 ft) Corbett east of Glen Roy
- Càrn Dearg (North of Gleann Eachach), an 817 m (2,680 ft) Corbett north of Gleann Eachach, and north of Glen Roy
- Càrn Dearg (South of Gleann Eachach), a 768 m (2,520 ft) Corbett south of Gleann Eachach, and north of Glen Roy
- Càrn Dearg (Oban), a 437 m (1,434 ft) Marilyn near Oban

== See also ==
- Càrn Dearg Mòr
- Càrn Mòr Dearg
