= Cruach Innse =

Mountain in Scotland

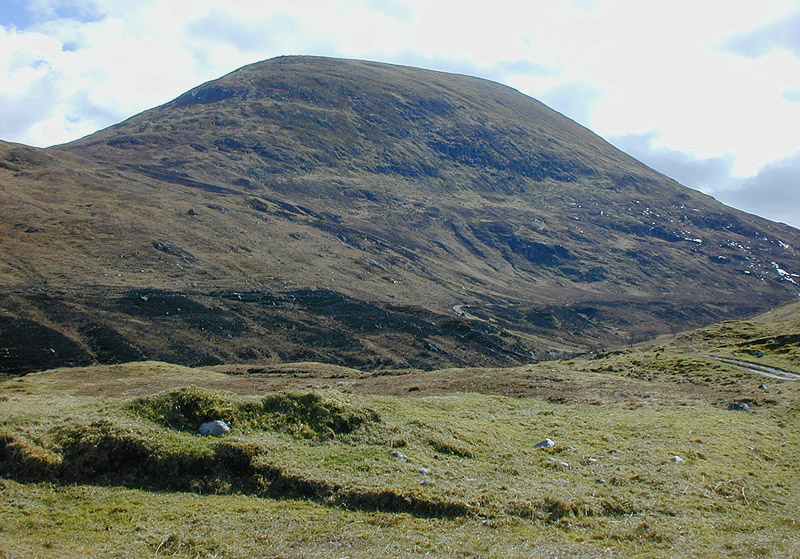
- Cruach Innse

Highest point
- Elevation: 857 m (2,812 ft)
- Prominence: 306 m (1,004 ft)
- Listing: Corbett, Marilyn
- Coordinates: 56°50′48″N 4°49′16″W

Geography
- Location: Lochaber, Scotland
- Parent range: Grampian Mountains
- OS grid: NN279763
- Topo map: OS Landranger 41

Cruach Innse (857 m) is a mountain in the Grampian Mountains of Scotland. It is located south of the village of Roybridge in Lochaber.

A craggy peak, it is usually climbed in conjunction with its southern neighbour Sgùrr Innse, starting at Corriechoile Lodge on the River Spean.
