= List of Corbett mountains =

Scottish peaks of 2,500 to 3,000 ft

Corbett
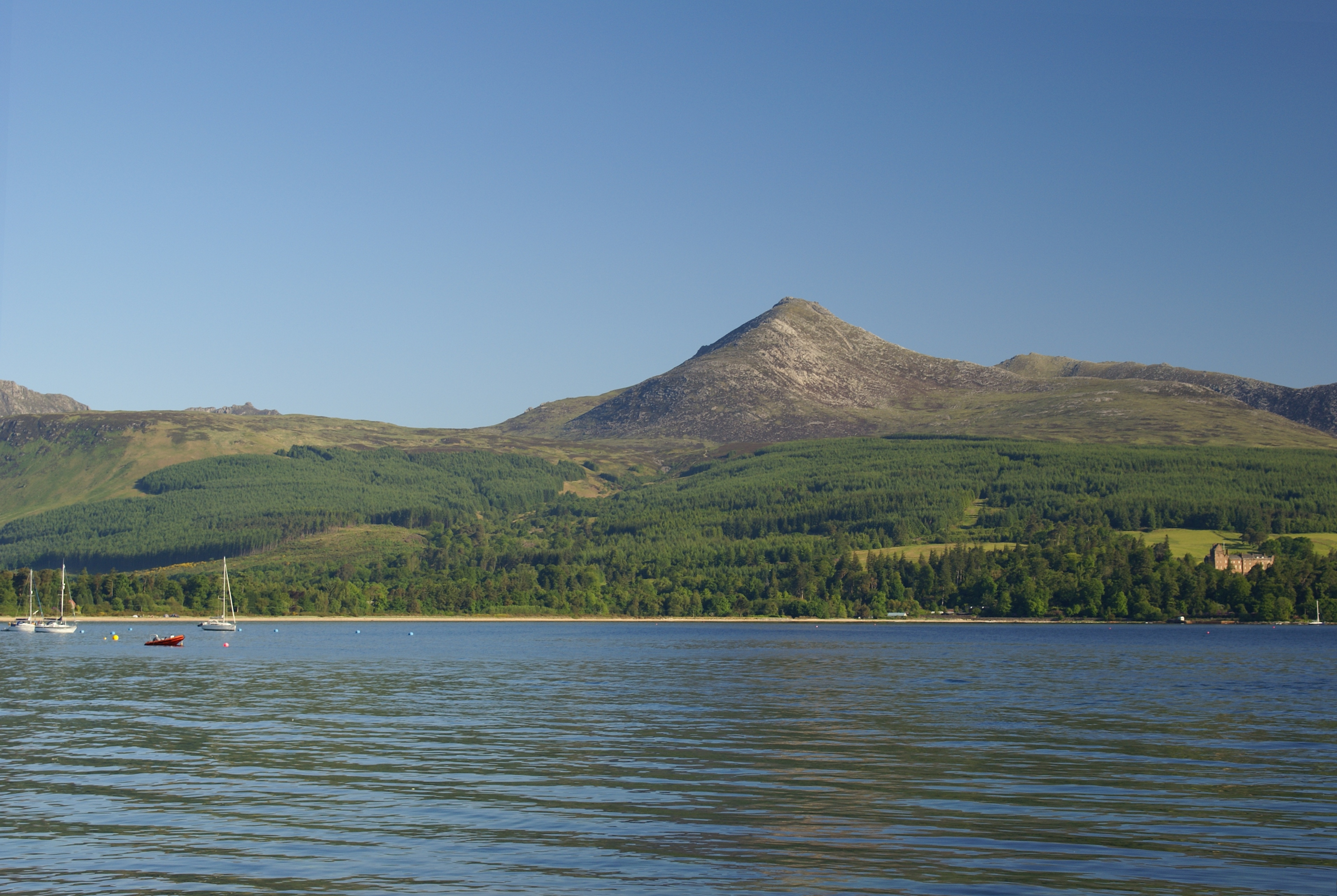
- Goat Fell is the highest point on the Isle of Arran, and the Corbett with the greatest prominence

Highest point
- Elevation: 2,500–3,000 ft (762.0–914.4 m)
- Prominence: over 500 ft (152.4 m)

Geography
- Location: 222 Scotland

This is a list of Corbett mountains in Scotland by height. Corbetts are defined as Scottish mountains between 2,500–3,000 feet (762.0–914.4 m) in height with a prominence of at least 500 feet (152.4 m); solely imperial measurement thresholds.

The first list was compiled in the 1920s by John Rooke Corbett, a Bristol-based climber and Scottish Mountaineering Club ("SMC") member, and was published posthumously, after his sister passed it to the SMC, in the 1953 edition of Munro's Tables. Corbetts are the next category down from the Munros and Munro Tops in terms of height (i.e. below the elevation threshold of 3,000 ft or 914.4 m), but their explicit prominence threshold of 500 feet (152 m), ensure they are material peaks. By definition, all Corbetts, given their prominence, are Marilyns. The SMC keeps a list of Corbetts.

As of October 2018, there were 222 Corbetts in Scotland. 21 of these 222 Corbetts have a prominence that exceeds the P600 threshold of 600 metres (1,969 ft), which would class them as "Majors". The highest Corbett, Beinn a' Chlaidheimh, at 913.96 metres (2,999 ft) is just below the threshold for a Munro, a status it held until it was demoted in 2012 based on new surveys; it ranks as the 478th highest mountain in the British Isles, on the Simms classification. The Corbett with the greatest prominence is Goat Fell at 875 metres (2,871 ft), which ranks it as the 16th most prominent mountain in the British Isles.

Climbers who climb all of the Corbetts are called Corbetteers, with the first being John Corbett himself who completed them in 1943. The second completion was by William McKnight Docharty in May 1960. A list of Corbetteers is maintained, which as of July 2018, totalled 678.

== Corbett mountains by height ==
This list was downloaded from the Database of British and Irish Hills ("DoBIH") in December 2025, and are peaks the DoBIH marks as being Corbetts ("C"). (Note: The Database of British and Irish Hills ("DoBIH") is the most referenced database for the classification of peaks in the British Isles, and the DoBIH is licensed under a "Creative Commons Attribution 3.0 Unported License".) The SMC updates their list of official Corbetts from time to time, and the DoBIH also updates their measurements as more detailed surveys are recorded, so these tables should not be amended or updated unless the entire DoBIH data is re-downloaded again.

Previously classed as a Munro ("xM" § DoBIH codes), or a Munro Top ("xMT § DoBIH codes).
Previously classed as a Graham ("xG" § DoBIH codes).

Scottish Mountaineering Club ("SMC") Corbetts, ranked by height (DoBIH, December 2025)
| Rank | Name | Section/Region | Council Area | Height (m) | Prom. (m) | Height (ft) | Prom. (ft) | Topo Map | OS Grid Reference | Classification (§ DoBIH codes) |
|---|---|---|---|---|---|---|---|---|---|---|
| 1 | Beinn a' Chlaidheimh | 14A: Loch Maree to Loch Broom | Highland | 913.96 | 268 | 2,999 | 879 | 19 | NH061775 | Ma,C,Sim,xMT |
| 2 | Beinn Dearg | 13A: Loch Torridon to Loch Maree | Highland | 913.7 | 469 | 2,998 | 1,539 | 19 24 | NG895608 | Ma,C,Sim |
| 3 | Sgùrr nan Ceannaichean | 12A: Kyle of Lochalsh to Garve | Highland | 913.43 | 185 | 2,997 | 607 | 25 | NH087480 | Ma,C,Sim,xMT |
| 4 | Sgùrr a' Choire-bheithe | 10B: Knoydart to Glen Kingie | Highland | 913.32 | 390 | 2,996 | 1,280 | 33 | NG895015 | Ma,C,Sim |
| 5 | Beinn Bhreac | 06A: Glen Tromie to Glen Tilt | Perth and Kinross | 912.44 | 171 | 2,994 | 561 | 43 | NN868820 | Ma,C,Sim |
| 6 | Leathad an Taobhain | 06A: Glen Tromie to Glen Tilt | Highland/Perth and Kinross | 911.7 | 155 | 2,991 | 509 | 43 | NN821858 | Ma,C,Sim |
| 7 | Streap | 10D: Mallaig to Fort William | Highland | 911.6 | 441 | 2,991 | 1,447 | 40 | NM946863 | Ma,C,Sim |
| 8 | The Fara | 04B: Loch Treig to Loch Ericht | Highland | 911.4 | 475 | 2,990 | 1,558 | 42 | NN598842 | Ma,C,Sim |
| 9 | Foinaven | 16B: Durness to Loch Shin | Highland | 911.05 | 688 | 2,989 | 2,257 | 9 | NC315506 | Ma,C,Sim |
| 10 | Beinn nan Oighreag | 02B: Glen Lyon to Glen Dochart & Loch Tay | Perth and Kinross/Stirling | 909.6 | 272 | 2,984 | 892 | 51 | NN541412 | Ma,C,Sim |
| 11 | Meall Buidhe | 02A: Loch Rannoch to Glen Lyon | Argyll and Bute/Perth and Kinross | 908.4 | 259 | 2,980 | 850 | 51 | NN426449 | Ma,C,Sim |
| 12 | Fuar Tholl | 13B: Applecross to Achnasheen | Highland | 907 | 242 | 2,976 | 794 | 25 | NG975489 | Ma,C,Sim |
| 13 | Leum Uilleim | 04A: Fort William to Loch Treig & Loch Leven | Highland | 906.5 | 496 | 2,974 | 1,627 | 41 | NN330641 | Ma,C,Sim |
| 14 | Beinn Maol Chaluim | 03B: Loch Linnhe to Loch Etive | Highland | 906.3 | 197 | 2,973 | 646 | 41 | NN134525 | Ma,C,Sim |
| 15 | Beinn Dearg Mòr | 14A: Loch Maree to Loch Broom | Highland | 906.28 | 564 | 2,973 | 1,850 | 19 | NH032799 | Ma,C,Sim |
| 16 | Ben Vuirich | 06B: Pitlochry to Braemar & Blairgowrie | Perth and Kinross | 903.1 | 345.9 | 2,963 | 1,135 | 43 | NN997700 | Ma,C,Sim |
| 17 | Beinn Damh | 13B: Applecross to Achnasheen | Highland | 902.4 | 517 | 2,961 | 1,696 | 24 | NG892502 | Ma,C,Sim |
| 18 | Beinn an Lochain | 19C: Loch Fyne to Bute and the Firth of Clyde | Argyll and Bute | 901.7 | 640 | 2,958 | 2,100 | 56 | NN218078 | Ma,C,Sim,xMT |
| 19 | Ben Tee | 10C: Loch Arkaig to Glen Moriston | Highland | 901.6 | 354 | 2,958 | 1,161 | 34 | NN240972 | Ma,C,Sim |
| 20 | Sgùrr an Fhuarain | 10B: Knoydart to Glen Kingie | Highland | 901 | 183 | 2,956 | 600 | 33 40 | NM987979 | Ma,C,Sim |
| 21 | Beinn Mheadhonach | 06A: Glen Tromie to Glen Tilt | Perth and Kinross | 900.9 | 164.7 | 2,956 | 540 | 43 | NN880759 | Ma,C,Sim |
| 22 | Beinn Odhar | 02B: Glen Lyon to Glen Dochart & Loch Tay | Argyll and Bute/Stirling | 900.8 | 457 | 2,955 | 1,499 | 50 | NN337338 | Ma,C,Sim |
| 23 | Aonach Buidhe | 12B: Killilan to Inverness | Highland | 900.3 | 475 | 2,954 | 1,558 | 25 | NH057324 | Ma,C,Sim |
| 24 | Culardoch | 08B: Cairngorms | Aberdeenshire | 900.1 | 312 | 2,953 | 1,024 | 36 43 | NO193988 | Ma,C,Sim |
| 25 | Beinn a' Bhuiridh | 03C: Glen Etive to Glen Lochy | Argyll and Bute | 898.4 | 172.2 | 2,948 | 565 | 50 | NN094283 | Ma,C,Sim |
| 26 | Sgùrr nan Eugallt | 10B: Knoydart to Glen Kingie | Highland | 897.5 | 612 | 2,945 | 2,008 | 33 | NG927048 | Ma,C,Sim |
| 27 | Ben Tirran | 07B: Braemar to Montrose | Angus | 897 | 246 | 2,943 | 807 | 44 | NO373746 | Ma,C,Sim |
| 28 | Ruadh-stac Beag | 13A: Loch Torridon to Loch Maree | Highland | 896 | 181 | 2,940 | 594 | 19 | NG972613 | Ma,C,Sim |
| 29 | Beinn Bhàn | 13B: Applecross to Achnasheen | Highland | 895.7 | 851 | 2,939 | 2,792 | 24 | NG803450 | Ma,C,Sim |
| 30 | Gairbeinn | 09B: Glen Albyn and the Monadh Liath | Highland | 895.5 | 211 | 2,938 | 692 | 34 | NN460985 | Ma,C,Sim |
| 31 | Creag Mhòr | 08B: Cairngorms | Moray | 895.1 | 167 | 2,937 | 548 | 36 | NJ057047 | Ma,C,Sim |
| 32 | Beinn a' Chuallaich | 05A: Loch Ericht to Glen Tromie & Glen Garry | Perth and Kinross | 892.2 | 527 | 2,927 | 1,729 | 42 | NN684617 | Ma,C,Sim |
| 33 | An Ruadh-stac | 13B: Applecross to Achnasheen | Highland | 890.4 | 327 | 2,921 | 1,073 | 25 | NG921480 | Ma,C,Sim |
| 34 | Beinn Enaiglair | 15A: Loch Broom to Strath Oykel | Highland | 890 | 234 | 2,920 | 768 | 20 | NH225805 | Ma,C,Sim |
| 35 | Creagan na Beinne | 01A: Loch Tay to Perth | Perth and Kinross | 889.1 | 460.7 | 2,917 | 1,511 | 51 52 | NN744368 | Ma,C,Sim |
| 36 | Sgùrr Dhòmhnuill | 18B: Sunart and Ardgour | Highland | 888.4 | 873 | 2,915 | 2,864 | 40 | NM889678 | Ma,C,Sim |
| 37 | Aonach Shasuinn | 11B: Glen Affric to Glen Moriston | Highland | 888 | 237 | 2,913 | 778 | 34 | NH173180 | Ma,C,Sim |
| 38 | Meall a' Ghiubhais | 13A: Loch Torridon to Loch Maree | Highland | 887 | 418 | 2,910 | 1,371 | 19 | NG976634 | Ma,C,Sim |
| 39 | Ben Aden | 10B: Knoydart to Glen Kingie | Highland | 887 | 250.7 | 2,910 | 823 | 33 40 | NM899986 | Ma,C,Sim |
| 40 | The Cobbler | 01D: Inveraray to Crianlarich | Argyll and Bute | 886.7 | 260 | 2,909 | 850 | 56 | NN259058 | Ma,C,Sim |
| 41 | Garbh Bheinn | 18B: Sunart and Ardgour | Highland | 885.6 | 688 | 2,906 | 2,257 | 40 | NM904622 | Ma,C,Sim |
| 42 | Buidhe Bheinn | 10A: Glen Shiel to Loch Hourn and Loch Quoich | Highland | 885.5 | 165 | 2,905 | 541 | 33 | NG963090 | Ma,C,Sim |
| 43 | Beinn a' Chaisteil | 02B: Glen Lyon to Glen Dochart & Loch Tay | Argyll and Bute/Perth and Kinross | 885.2 | 466 | 2,904 | 1,529 | 50 | NN347364 | Ma,C,Sim |
| 44 | Stob Dubh | 03C: Glen Etive to Glen Lochy | Highland | 884.2 | 522 | 2,901 | 1,713 | 50 | NN166488 | Ma,C,Sim |
| 45 | Cam Chreag | 02B: Glen Lyon to Glen Dochart & Loch Tay | Argyll and Bute/Perth and Kinross/Stirling | 883.6 | 158.3 | 2,899 | 519 | 50 | NN375346 | Ma,C,Sim |
| 46 | Beinn Odhar Bheag | 18A: Moidart and Ardnamurchan | Highland | 883.3 | 775 | 2,898 | 2,543 | 40 | NM846778 | Ma,C,Sim |
| 47 | Rois-Bheinn | 18A: Moidart and Ardnamurchan | Highland | 882.4 | 524 | 2,895 | 1,719 | 40 | NM756778 | Ma,C,Sim |
| 48 | Beinn Chùirn | 01D: Inveraray to Crianlarich | Argyll and Bute/Stirling | 881.9 | 448 | 2,893 | 1,470 | 50 | NN280292 | Ma,C,Sim |
| 49 | Sgurr Mhurlagain | 10B: Knoydart to Glen Kingie | Highland | 880 | 515 | 2,887 | 1,690 | 33 | NN012944 | Ma,C,Sim |
| 50 | Fraochaidh | 03B: Loch Linnhe to Loch Etive | Argyll and Bute/Highland | 879 | 551 | 2,884 | 1,808 | 41 | NN029517 | Ma,C,Sim |
| 51 | Sguman Coinntich | 12B: Killilan to Inverness | Highland | 879 | 415 | 2,884 | 1,362 | 25 | NG977303 | Ma,C,Sim |
| 52 | Sgurr a' Mhuilinn | 12A: Kyle of Lochalsh to Garve | Highland | 878.8 | 580 | 2,883 | 1,903 | 25 | NH264557 | Ma,C,Sim |
| 53 | Creag Uchdag | 01A: Loch Tay to Perth | Perth and Kinross/Stirling | 878.8 | 276.4 | 2,883 | 907 | 51 52 | NN708323 | Ma,C,Sim |
| 54 | Ben Ledi | 01C: Loch Lomond to Strathyre | Stirling | 878.6 | 528 | 2,883 | 1,732 | 57 | NN562097 | Ma,C,Sim |
| 55 | Càrn an Fhreiceadain | 09B: Glen Albyn and the Monadh Liath | Highland | 877.7 | 172.5 | 2,880 | 566 | 35 | NH725071 | Ma,C,Sim |
| 56 | A' Chaoirnich | 06A: Glen Tromie to Glen Tilt | Highland | 875.7 | 213.8 | 2,873 | 701 | 42 | NN735807 | Ma,C,Sim |
| 57 | Goat Fell | 20C: Arran and Holy Island | North Ayrshire | 875 | 875 | 2,871 | 2,871 | 62 69 | NR991415 | Ma,C,Sim,CoH, CoU,SIB |
| 58 | Baosbheinn | 13A: Loch Torridon to Loch Maree | Highland | 875 | 443 | 2,871 | 1,453 | 19 24 | NG870654 | Ma,C,Sim |
| 59 | Sgùrr na Ba Glaise | 18A: Moidart and Ardnamurchan | Highland | 874.1 | 172.9 | 2,868 | 567 | 40 | NM770777 | Ma,C,Sim |
| 60 | Ben Hee | 16B: Durness to Loch Shin | Highland | 873 | 607 | 2,864 | 1,991 | 16 | NC426339 | Ma,C,Sim |
| 61 | Morven | 21A: Tomintoul to Banff | Aberdeenshire | 872 | 387 | 2,861 | 1,270 | 37 | NJ376039 | Ma,C,Sim |
| 62 | Sgorr nan Lochan Uaine | 13B: Applecross to Achnasheen | Highland | 871.3 | 206.8 | 2,859 | 678 | 25 | NG969531 | Ma,C,Sim |
| 63 | Faochaig | 12B: Killilan to Inverness | Highland | 868.9 | 231 | 2,851 | 758 | 25 | NH021317 | Ma,C,Sim |
| 64 | Bidein a' Chabair | 10D: Mallaig to Fort William | Highland | 867.5 | 553 | 2,846 | 1,814 | 33 40 | NM889930 | Ma,C,Sim |
| 65 | Beinn Pharlagain | 04B: Loch Treig to Loch Ericht | Perth and Kinross | 867.3 | 192.4 | 2,845 | 631 | 42 | NN448642 | Ma,C,Sim |
| 66 | Stob a' Choin | 01C: Loch Lomond to Strathyre | Stirling | 867.2 | 478 | 2,845 | 1,568 | 56 | NN417159 | Ma,C,Sim |
| 67 | Garbh Bheinn | 03A: Loch Leven to Rannoch Station | Highland | 867 | 332 | 2,844 | 1,089 | 41 | NN169600 | Ma,C,Sim |
| 68 | Beinn Mhic Chasgaig | 03C: Glen Etive to Glen Lochy | Highland | 864 | 166 | 2,835 | 545 | 41 | NN221502 | Ma,C,Sim |
| 69 | Sgùrr na Feartaig | 12A: Kyle of Lochalsh to Garve | Highland | 863 | 267 | 2,831 | 876 | 25 | NH055453 | Ma,C,Sim |
| 70 | Creag an Dail Bheag | 08B: Cairngorms | Aberdeenshire | 863 | 211 | 2,831 | 692 | 36 43 | NO157981 | Ma,Sim,C |
| 71 | Càrn a' Choire Ghairbh | 11B: Glen Affric to Glen Moriston | Highland | 862.5 | 199 | 2,830 | 653 | 34 | NH136188 | Ma,C,Sim |
| 72 | Conachcraig | 07A: Braemar to Montrose | Aberdeenshire | 862.5 | 185 | 2,830 | 607 | 44 | NO279865 | Ma,C,Sim |
| 73 | Meall na h-Aisre | 09B: Glen Albyn and the Monadh Liath | Highland | 862.1 | 155 | 2,828 | 509 | 35 | NH515000 | Ma,C,Sim |
| 74 | Beinn a' Bhathaich Àrd | 12A: Kyle of Lochalsh to Garve | Highland | 861.7 | 241 | 2,827 | 791 | 26 | NH360434 | Ma,C,Sim |
| 75 | Cam Chreag | 02A: Loch Rannoch to Glen Lyon | Perth and Kinross | 861.7 | 166.2 | 2,827 | 545 | 51 | NN536491 | Ma,C,Sim |
| 76 | Beinn Tharsuinn | 12A: Kyle of Lochalsh to Garve | Highland | 861.2 | 224 | 2,825 | 735 | 25 | NH055433 | Ma,C,Sim |
| 77 | Beinn Luibhean | 01D: Inveraray to Crianlarich | Argyll and Bute | 859.7 | 181 | 2,821 | 594 | 56 | NN242079 | Ma,C,Sim |
| 78 | Morrone | 06B: Pitlochry to Braemar & Blairgowrie | Aberdeenshire | 859.5 | 157.6 | 2,820 | 517 | 43 | NO132886 | Ma,C,Sim |
| 79 | Beinn Lair | 14A: Loch Maree to Loch Broom | Highland | 859 | 455 | 2,818 | 1,493 | 19 | NG981732 | Ma,C,Sim |
| 80 | Caisteal Abhail | 20C: Arran and Holy Island | North Ayrshire | 859 | 428.5 | 2,818 | 1,406 | 62 69 | NR969443 | Ma,C,Sim |
| 81 | Càrn Dearg Mòr | 06A: Glen Tromie to Glen Tilt | Highland | 857.4 | 290 | 2,813 | 951 | 35 43 | NN823911 | Ma,C,Sim |
| 82 | Fraoch Bheinn | 10B: Knoydart to Glen Kingie | Highland | 857.3 | 399 | 2,813 | 1,309 | 33 40 | NM986940 | Ma,C,Sim |
| 83 | Beinn a' Chrulaiste | 03A: Loch Leven to Rannoch Station | Highland | 857 | 464 | 2,812 | 1,522 | 41 | NN246566 | Ma,C,Sim |
| 84 | Cruach Innse | 04A: Fort William to Loch Treig & Loch Leven | Highland | 857 | 306 | 2,812 | 1,004 | 41 | NN279763 | Ma,C,Sim |
| 85 | Beinn a' Chaisgein Mòr | 14A: Loch Maree to Loch Broom | Highland | 856.1 | 345 | 2,809 | 1,132 | 19 | NG982785 | Ma,C,Sim |
| 86 | Stob an Aonaich Mhòir | 05A: Loch Ericht to Glen Tromie & Glen Garry | Perth and Kinross | 855.6 | 231.8 | 2,807 | 760 | 42 | NN537694 | Ma,C,Sim |
| 87 | Beinn Bhuidhe | 10B: Knoydart to Glen Kingie | Highland | 855.4 | 308.4 | 2,806 | 1,012 | 33 40 | NM821967 | Ma,C,Sim |
| 88 | Beinn an Eoin | 13A: Loch Torridon to Loch Maree | Highland | 855 | 434 | 2,805 | 1,424 | 19 | NG905646 | Ma,C,Sim |
| 89 | Creach Bheinn | 18C: Morvern and Kingairloch | Highland | 853 | 755 | 2,799 | 2,477 | 49 | NM870576 | Ma,C,Sim |
| 90 | Meall an t-Seallaidh | 01C: Loch Lomond to Strathyre | Stirling | 852.7 | 428 | 2,798 | 1,404 | 51 | NN542234 | Ma,C,Sim |
| 91 | Cùl Mòr | 16F: Lochinver to Ullapool | Highland | 849.7 | 652 | 2,788 | 2,139 | 15 | NC162119 | Ma,C,Sim |
| 92 | Sgùrr Ghiubhsachain | 18B: Sunart and Ardgour | Highland | 849.2 | 614 | 2,786 | 2,014 | 40 | NM875751 | Ma,C,Sim |
| 93 | Bac an Eich | 12A: Kyle of Lochalsh to Garve | Highland | 849 | 336 | 2,785 | 1,102 | 25 | NH222489 | Ma,C,Sim |
| 94 | Beinn nan Imirean | 02B: Glen Lyon to Glen Dochart & Loch Tay | Stirling | 848.3 | 189.1 | 2,783 | 620 | 51 | NN419309 | Ma,C,Sim |
| 95 | Canisp | 16F: Lochinver to Ullapool | Highland | 848.1 | 690 | 2,782 | 2,264 | 15 | NC202187 | Ma,C,Sim |
| 96 | Ben Donich | 19C: Loch Fyne to Bute and the Firth of Clyde | Argyll and Bute | 846.5 | 557 | 2,777 | 1,827 | 56 | NN218043 | Ma,C,Sim |
| 97 | Beinn Resipol | 18B: Sunart and Ardgour | Highland | 845 | 502 | 2,772 | 1,647 | 40 | NM766654 | Ma,C,Sim |
| 98 | Càrn Bàn | 15A: Loch Broom to Strath Oykel | Highland | 843.3 | 205 | 2,767 | 673 | 20 | NH338875 | Ma,C,Sim |
| 99 | Merrick | 27B: Carrick and Galloway | Dumfries and Galloway | 843 | 705 | 2,766 | 2,313 | 77 | NX427855 | Ma,C,Sim,D, CoH,CoU,CoA |
| 100 | Ben Vrackie | 06B: Pitlochry to Braemar & Blairgowrie | Perth and Kinross | 842.2 | 405.6 | 2,763 | 1,331 | 43 | NN950632 | Ma,C,Sim |
| 101 | Beinn Mholach | 05A: Loch Ericht to Glen Tromie & Glen Garry | Perth and Kinross | 841.8 | 196 | 2,762 | 643 | 42 | NN587654 | Ma,C,Sim |
| 102 | Sgùrr an Airgid | 11A: Loch Duich to Cannich | Highland | 841.2 | 394 | 2,760 | 1,293 | 25 33 | NG940227 | Ma,C,Sim |
| 103 | Ben Rinnes | 21A: Tomintoul to Banff | Moray | 840.9 | 513 | 2,759 | 1,683 | 28 | NJ254354 | Ma,C,Sim |
| 104 | Beinn Udlaidh | 03C: Glen Etive to Glen Lochy | Argyll and Bute | 840.4 | 522 | 2,757 | 1,713 | 50 | NN280331 | Ma,C,Sim |
| 105 | Broad Law | 28B: The River Tweed to the English Border | Scottish Borders | 840.1 | 653.5 | 2,756 | 2,144 | 72 | NT146235 | Ma,C,Sim,D, CoH,CoU,CoA |
| 106 | Beinn Trilleachan | 03B: Loch Linnhe to Loch Etive | Argyll and Bute/Highland | 840 | 478 | 2,756 | 1,568 | 50 | NN086439 | Ma,C,Sim |
| 107 | Càrn Chuinneag | 15B: Loch Vaich to Moray Firth | Highland | 838.7 | 461 | 2,752 | 1,512 | 20 | NH483833 | Ma,C,Sim |
| 108 | Meallan nan Uan | 12A: Kyle of Lochalsh to Garve | Highland | 838.3 | 156.4 | 2,750 | 509 | 25 | NH263544 | Ma,C,Sim |
| 109 | Sgùrr Gaorsaic | 11A: Loch Duich to Cannich | Highland | 838.2 | 169.2 | 2,750 | 555 | 25 33 | NH035218 | Ma,C,Sim |
| 110 | Meall na h-Eilde | 10C: Loch Arkaig to Glen Moriston | Highland | 837.2 | 450 | 2,747 | 1,486 | 34 | NN185946 | Ma,C,Sim |
| 111 | Sgùrr Cos na Breachd-laoidh | 10B: Knoydart to Glen Kingie | Highland | 835.2 | 188.5 | 2,740 | 618 | 33 40 | NM947946 | Ma,C,Sim |
| 112 | Sròn a' Choire Chnapanich | 02A: Loch Rannoch to Glen Lyon | Perth and Kinross | 835 | 205.8 | 2,740 | 676 | 51 | NN456453 | Ma,C,Sim |
| 113 | Càrn Dearg | 09C: Loch Lochy to Loch Laggan | Highland | 834 | 251 | 2,736 | 823 | 34 41 | NN345887 | Ma,C,Sim |
| 114 | Creag nan Gabhar | 07A: Braemar to Montrose | Aberdeenshire | 834 | 178 | 2,736 | 584 | 43 | NO154841 | Ma,C,Sim |
| 115 | Càrn Mòr | 10D: Mallaig to Fort William | Highland | 830 | 614 | 2,723 | 2,014 | 33 40 | NM903909 | Ma,C,Sim |
| 116 | Beinn Dearg | 02A: Loch Rannoch to Glen Lyon | Perth and Kinross | 829.5 | 201 | 2,721 | 659 | 51 | NN608497 | Ma,C,Sim |
| 117 | Brown Cow Hill | 08B: Cairngorms | Aberdeenshire | 828.8 | 295 | 2,719 | 968 | 36 | NJ221044 | Ma,C,Sim |
| 118 | An Dùn | 05B: Loch Ericht to Glen Tromie & Glen Garry | Highland/Perth and Kinross | 827.4 | 232 | 2,715 | 761 | 42 | NN716801 | Ma,Sim,C |
| 119 | Beinn Tarsuinn | 20C: Arran and Holy Island | North Ayrshire | 826 | 236.9 | 2,710 | 777 | 62 69 | NR960412 | Ma,C,Sim |
| 120 | Geal-chàrn Mòr | 09B: Glen Albyn and the Monadh Liath | Highland | 824.1 | 227.5 | 2,704 | 746 | 35 | NH836123 | Ma,C,Sim |
| 121 | White Coomb | 28B: The River Tweed to the English Border | Dumfries and Galloway | 821.6 | 375 | 2,696 | 1,230 | 79 | NT163150 | Ma,C,Sim,D,CoH |
| 122 | Geal Chàrn | 08B: Cairngorms | Highland | 820.6 | 173 | 2,692 | 568 | 36 | NJ090126 | Ma,C,Sim |
| 123 | Benvane | 01C: Loch Lomond to Strathyre | Stirling | 820.5 | 214 | 2,692 | 702.1 | 57 | NN535137 | Ma,C,Sim |
| 124 | Beinn Chaorach | 02B: Glen Lyon to Glen Dochart & Loch Tay | Argyll and Bute/Stirling | 818.5 | 180 | 2,685 | 591 | 50 | NN358328 | Ma,C,Sim |
| 125 | Càrn na Drochaide | 08B: Cairngorms | Aberdeenshire | 818 | 222 | 2,684 | 728 | 36 43 | NO127938 | Ma,C,Sim |
| 126 | Sgorr na Diollaid | 12B: Killilan to Inverness | Highland | 817.9 | 306 | 2,683 | 1,004 | 25 | NH281362 | Ma,C,Sim |
| 127 | Beinn Dearg Bheag | 14A: Loch Maree to Loch Broom | Highland | 817.9 | 226.1 | 2,683 | 742 | 19 | NH019811 | Ma,C,Sim |
| 128 | Stob Coire Creagach | 01D: Inveraray to Crianlarich | Argyll and Bute | 817.8 | 505 | 2,683 | 1,657 | 50 56 | NN230109 | Ma,C,Sim |
| 129 | Càrn a' Chuilinn | 09B: Glen Albyn and the Monadh Liath | Highland | 816.6 | 178 | 2,679 | 584 | 34 | NH416034 | Ma,C,Sim |
| 130 | Càrn Dearg | 09B: Glen Albyn and the Monadh Liath | Highland | 816.5 | 201 | 2,679 | 659 | 34 | NN349966 | Ma,C,Sim |
| 131 | Breabag | 16E: Scourie to Lairg | Highland | 815 | 307 | 2,674 | 1,007 | 15 | NC286157 | Ma,C,Sim |
| 132 | An Stac | 18A: Moidart and Ardnamurchan | Highland | 814.6 | 256 | 2,673 | 840 | 40 | NM762792 | Ma,C,Sim |
| 133 | Corserine | 27B: Carrick and Galloway | Dumfries and Galloway | 814 | 488 | 2,671 | 1,601 | 77 | NX497870 | Ma,C,Sim,D |
| 134 | Sgor Mòr | 08A: Cairngorms | Aberdeenshire | 813 | 234 | 2,667 | 768 | 43 | NO007914 | Ma,C,Sim |
| 135 | An Sìthean | 12A: Kyle of Lochalsh to Garve | Highland | 812.1 | 268 | 2,664 | 879 | 25 | NH171453 | Ma,C,Sim |
| 136 | Askival | 17D: Canna, Rhum and Eigg | Highland | 812 | 812 | 2,664 | 2,664 | 39 | NM393952 | Ma,C,Sim,SIB |
| 137 | Beinn Each | 01B: Strathyre to Strathallan | Stirling | 811.2 | 157.1 | 2,661 | 515 | 57 | NN601158 | Ma,C,Sim |
| 138 | Càrn na Saobhaidhe | 09B: Glen Albyn and the Monadh Liath | Highland | 811.1 | 170 | 2,661 | 558 | 35 | NH598144 | Ma,C,Sim |
| 139 | Meall a' Bhuachaille | 08A: Cairngorms | Highland | 810 | 436 | 2,657 | 1,430 | 36 | NH990115 | Ma,C,Sim |
| 140 | Creach Bheinn | 03B: Loch Linnhe to Loch Etive | Argyll and Bute | 810 | 245 | 2,657 | 804 | 50 | NN023422 | Ma,C,Sim |
| 141 | Meall na Fearna | 01B: Strathyre to Strathallan | Perth and Kinross | 810 | 237 | 2,657 | 778 | 57 | NN650186 | Ma,C,Sim |
| 142 | Sgùrr Innse | 04A: Fort William to Loch Treig & Loch Leven | Highland | 809 | 216 | 2,654 | 709 | 41 | NN290748 | Ma,C,Sim |
| 143 | Quinag - Sail Gharbh | 16E: Scourie to Lairg | Highland | 808.8 | 550 | 2,654 | 1,804 | 15 | NC209292 | Ma,C,Sim |
| 144 | Creag Mac Ranaich | 01C: Loch Lomond to Strathyre | Stirling | 808.6 | 213 | 2,653 | 699 | 51 | NN545255 | Ma,C,Sim |
| 145 | Garbh-bheinn | 17B: Minginish and the Cuillin Hills | Highland | 808.3 | 181 | 2,652 | 594 | 32 | NG531232 | Ma,C,Sim |
| 146 | Hart Fell | 28B: The River Tweed to the English Border | Dumfries and Galloway/Scottish Borders | 808 | 200 | 2,651 | 656 | 78 | NT113135 | Ma,C,Sim,D |
| 147 | Creag Rainich | 14A: Loch Maree to Loch Broom | Highland | 807.9 | 452 | 2,651 | 1,483 | 19 | NH096751 | Ma,C,Sim |
| 148 | Monamenach | 07A: Braemar to Montrose | Angus/Perth and Kinross | 807 | 199.8 | 2,648 | 656 | 43 | NO176706 | Ma,C,Sim |
| 149 | Meall nan Subh | 02B: Glen Lyon to Glen Dochart & Loch Tay | Perth and Kinross | 806.3 | 214 | 2,645 | 702 | 51 | NN460397 | Ma,C,Sim |
| 150 | Ben Gulabin | 06B: Pitlochry to Braemar & Blairgowrie | Perth and Kinross | 805.9 | 203 | 2,644 | 666 | 43 | NO100722 | Ma,C,Sim |
| 151 | Beinn Iaruinn | 09C: Loch Lochy to Loch Laggan | Highland | 805 | 446 | 2,641 | 1,463 | 34 | NN296900 | Ma,C,Sim |
| 152 | Beinn na h-Eaglaise | 10A: Glen Shiel to Loch Hourn and Loch Quoich | Highland | 805 | 201 | 2,641 | 659 | 33 | NG854120 | Ma,C,Sim |
| 153 | Beinn nam Fuaran | 02B: Glen Lyon to Glen Dochart & Loch Tay | Argyll and Bute/Perth and Kinross | 804.2 | 259.3 | 2,638 | 851 | 50 | NN361381 | Ma,C,Sim |
| 154 | Càrn Mòr | 21A: Tomintoul to Banff | Aberdeenshire/Moray | 804 | 349 | 2,638 | 1,145 | 37 | NJ265183 | Ma,C,Sim |
| 155 | Geal Chàrn | 10C: Loch Arkaig to Glen Moriston | Highland | 804 | 156 | 2,638 | 512 | 34 | NN156942 | Ma,C,Sim |
| 156 | Beinn Bhreac-liath | 03C: Glen Etive to Glen Lochy | Argyll and Bute | 802 | 215 | 2,631 | 705 | 50 | NN302339 | Ma,C,Sim |
| 157 | Cranstackie | 16B: Durness to Loch Shin | Highland | 801.9 | 561 | 2,631 | 1,840 | 9 | NC350556 | Ma,C,Sim |
| 158 | Meallan Liath Coire Mhic Dhùghaill | 16B: Durness to Loch Shin | Highland | 800.8 | 349.9 | 2,627 | 1,148 | 15 | NC357391 | Ma,C,Sim |
| 159 | An Cliseam | 24B: Harris and Nearby Islands | Na h-Eileanan Siar | 800 | 800 | 2,625 | 2,625 | 13 14 | NB154073 | Ma,C,Sim, CoU,CoA,SIB |
| 160 | The Sow of Atholl | 05A: Loch Ericht to Glen Tromie & Glen Garry | Perth and Kinross | 798.9 | 160.8 | 2,621 | 528 | 42 | NN625741 | Ma,C,Sim |
| 161 | Am Bàthach | 11A: Loch Duich to Cannich | Highland | 798.1 | 232.4 | 2,618 | 758 | 33 | NH073143 | Ma,C,Sim |
| 162 | Cìr Mhòr | 20C: Arran and Holy Island | North Ayrshire | 798.1 | 176.6 | 2,618 | 574 | 62 69 | NR972431 | Ma,C,Sim |
| 163 | Cairnsmore of Carsphairn | 27C: The Glenkens to Annandale | Dumfries and Galloway | 797 | 582 | 2,615 | 1,909 | 77 | NX594979 | Ma,C,Sim,D |
| 164 | Beinn Dronaig | 12A: Kyle of Lochalsh to Garve | Highland | 797 | 434 | 2,615 | 1,424 | 25 | NH037381 | Ma,C,Sim |
| 165 | Sgùrr an Utha | 10D: Mallaig to Fort William | Highland | 796 | 499 | 2,612 | 1,637 | 40 | NM885839 | Ma,C,Sim |
| 166 | Beinn Bhàn | 10D: Mallaig to Fort William | Highland | 796 | 495 | 2,612 | 1,624 | 34 41 | NN140857 | Ma,C,Sim |
| 167 | Mam na Gualainn | 04A: Fort William to Loch Treig & Loch Leven | Highland | 796 | 461 | 2,612 | 1,512 | 41 | NN115625 | Ma,C,Sim |
| 168 | Beinn Mhic-Mhonaidh | 03C: Glen Etive to Glen Lochy | Argyll and Bute | 796 | 420 | 2,612 | 1,378 | 50 | NN208350 | Ma,C,Sim |
| 169 | Sgùrr Coire Choinnichean | 10B: Knoydart to Glen Kingie | Highland | 796 | 304 | 2,612 | 997 | 33 | NG790010 | Ma,C,Sim |
| 170 | Beinn Leoid | 16E: Scourie to Lairg | Highland | 792 | 495 | 2,598 | 1,624 | 15 | NC320294 | Ma,C,Sim |
| 171 | Beinn Airigh Charr | 14A: Loch Maree to Loch Broom | Highland | 792 | 477 | 2,598 | 1,565 | 19 | NG930761 | Ma,C,Sim |
| 172 | Glas Bheinn | 04A: Fort William to Loch Treig & Loch Leven | Highland | 792 | 388 | 2,598 | 1,273 | 41 | NN258641 | Ma,C,Sim |
| 173 | Sgùrr a' Chaorachain | 13B: Applecross to Achnasheen | Highland | 792 | 210 | 2,598 | 689 | 24 | NG796417 | Ma,C,Sim |
| 174 | Càrn Ealasaid | 08B: Cairngorms | Aberdeenshire/Moray | 792 | 156 | 2,598 | 512 | 36 | NJ227117 | Ma,C,Sim |
| 175 | Meall Dubh | 10C: Loch Arkaig to Glen Moriston | Highland | 789 | 544 | 2,589 | 1,785 | 34 | NH245078 | Ma,C,Sim |
| 176 | Beinn Loinne | 10A: Glen Shiel to Loch Hourn and Loch Quoich | Highland | 789 | 354 | 2,589 | 1,161 | 34 | NH130076 | Ma,C,Sim |
| 177 | The Brack | 19C: Loch Fyne to Bute and the Firth of Clyde | Argyll and Bute | 787.5 | 403 | 2,584 | 1,322 | 56 | NN245030 | Ma,C,Sim |
| 178 | Auchnafree Hill | 01A: Loch Tay to Perth | Perth and Kinross | 787.4 | 211.7 | 2,583 | 695 | 52 | NN808308 | Ma,C,Sim |
| 179 | Meall Tàirneachan | 02A: Loch Rannoch to Glen Lyon | Perth and Kinross | 787 | 420 | 2,582 | 1,378 | 52 | NN807543 | Ma,C,Sim |
| 180 | Beinn a' Chaisteil | 15B: Loch Vaich to Moray Firth | Highland | 787 | 280 | 2,582 | 919 | 20 | NH369801 | Ma,C,Sim |
| 181 | Càrn na Nathrach | 18B: Sunart and Ardgour | Highland | 786 | 382 | 2,579 | 1,253 | 40 | NM886698 | Ma,C,Sim |
| 182 | Arkle | 16B: Durness to Loch Shin | Highland | 785.9 | 391 | 2,578 | 1,283 | 9 | NC302461 | Ma,C,Sim |
| 183 | Beinn an Òir | 20A: Jura, Scarba and Colonsay | Argyll and Bute | 785 | 785 | 2,575 | 2,575 | 60 61 | NR498749 | Ma,C,Sim,SIB |
| 184 | Beinn na Caillich | 10B: Knoydart to Glen Kingie | Highland | 785 | 317 | 2,575 | 1,040 | 33 | NG795066 | Ma,C,Sim |
| 185 | Beinn Mhic Ceididh | 18A: Moidart and Ardnamurchan | Highland | 783 | 296 | 2,569 | 971 | 40 | NM828788 | Ma,C,Sim |
| 186 | Farragon Hill | 02A: Loch Rannoch to Glen Lyon | Perth and Kinross | 782.4 | 185.6 | 2,567 | 609 | 52 | NN840553 | Ma,C,Sim |
| 187 | Sgùrr Dubh | 13B: Applecross to Achnasheen | Highland | 781.9 | 215 | 2,565 | 705 | 25 | NG979557 | Ma,C,Sim |
| 188 | Corryhabbie Hill | 21A: Tomintoul to Banff | Moray | 781.3 | 280.3 | 2,563 | 920 | 37 | NJ280288 | Ma,C,Sim |
| 189 | Ainshval | 17D: Canna, Rhum and Eigg | Highland | 781 | 326 | 2,562 | 1,070 | 39 | NM378943 | Ma,C,Sim |
| 190 | Beinn Bheula | 19C: Loch Fyne to Bute and the Firth of Clyde | Argyll and Bute | 779.4 | 557 | 2,557 | 1,827 | 56 | NS154983 | Ma,C,Sim |
| 191 | Sgùrr Mhic Bharraich | 10A: Glen Shiel to Loch Hourn and Loch Quoich | Highland | 779 | 317 | 2,556 | 1,040 | 33 | NG917173 | Ma,C,Sim |
| 192 | Meall nam Maigheach | 02B: Glen Lyon to Glen Dochart & Loch Tay | Perth and Kinross | 778.9 | 176 | 2,555 | 577 | 51 | NN586435 | Ma,C,Sim |
| 193 | Mount Battock | 07B: Braemar to Montrose | Aberdeenshire/Angus | 778 | 286 | 2,552 | 938 | 44 | NO549844 | Ma,C,Sim,CoH |
| 194 | Meall na Leitreach | 05A: Loch Ericht to Glen Tromie & Glen Garry | Perth and Kinross | 777.1 | 331 | 2,550 | 1,086 | 42 | NN640702 | Ma,C,Sim |
| 195 | Meall Horn | 16B: Durness to Loch Shin | Highland | 776.7 | 264 | 2,548 | 866 | 9 | NC352449 | Ma,C,Sim |
| 196 | Sgorr Craobh a' Chaorainn | 18B: Sunart and Ardgour | Highland | 775.7 | 188 | 2,545 | 617 | 40 | NM895757 | Ma,C,Sim |
| 197 | Quinag - Sàil Gorm | 16E: Scourie to Lairg | Highland | 775.6 | 156.2 | 2,545 | 512 | 15 | NC198304 | Ma,C,Sim |
| 198 | Glamaig - Sgùrr Mhàiri | 17B: Minginish and the Cuillin Hills | Highland | 775 | 485 | 2,543 | 1,591 | 32 | NG513300 | Ma,C,Sim |
| 199 | Glas Bheinn | 16E: Scourie to Lairg | Highland | 774.9 | 162 | 2,542 | 531 | 15 | NC254265 | Ma,C,Sim |
| 200 | Shalloch on Minnoch | 27B: Carrick and Galloway | South Ayrshire | 774.2 | 193.6 | 2,540 | 635 | 77 | NX407905 | Ma,C,Sim,D |
| 201 | Beinn nan Caorach | 10A: Glen Shiel to Loch Hourn and Loch Quoich | Highland | 774 | 227 | 2,539 | 745 | 33 | NG871121 | Ma,C,Sim |
| 202 | Beinn Spionnaidh | 16B: Durness to Loch Shin | Highland | 773.7 | 211.1 | 2,538 | 693 | 9 | NC361572 | Ma,C,Sim |
| 203 | Meall a' Phubuill | 10D: Mallaig to Fort William | Highland | 772.7 | 467 | 2,535 | 1,532 | 41 | NN029854 | Ma,C,Sim |
| 204 | Druim Tarsuinn | 18B: Sunart and Ardgour | Highland | 771.9 | 261 | 2,532 | 856 | 40 | NM874727 | Ma,C,Sim |
| 205 | Beinn Stacach | 01C: Loch Lomond to Strathyre | Stirling | 771.8 | 364 | 2,532 | 1,194 | 57 | NN474163 | Ma,C,Sim |
| 206 | Meall Lighiche | 03B: Loch Linnhe to Loch Etive | Highland | 771.2 | 246 | 2,530 | 807 | 41 | NN094528 | Ma,C,Sim |
| 207 | Stob Coire a' Chearcaill | 18B: Sunart and Ardgour | Highland | 771 | 575 | 2,530 | 1,886 | 41 | NN016726 | Ma,C,Sim |
| 208 | Càrn Dearg | 09B: Glen Albyn and the Monadh Liath | Highland | 769.6 | 198 | 2,525 | 650 | 34 | NN357948 | Ma,C,Sim |
| 209 | Cùl Beag | 16F: Lochinver to Ullapool | Highland | 769.4 | 546 | 2,524 | 1,791 | 15 | NC140088 | Ma,C,Sim |
| 210 | Meallach Mhòr | 06A: Glen Tromie to Glen Tilt | Highland | 769 | 234.1 | 2,523 | 768 | 35 | NN776908 | Ma,C,Sim |
| 211 | Beinn a' Chòin | 01C: Loch Lomond to Strathyre | Argyll and Bute/Stirling | 768.7 | 345 | 2,522 | 1,132 | 50 56 | NN354130 | Ma,C,Sim |
| 212 | Sail Mhòr | 14A: Loch Maree to Loch Broom | Highland | 766.2 | 321 | 2,514 | 1,053 | 19 | NH032887 | Ma,C,Sim |
| 213 | Fuar Bheinn | 18C: Morvern and Kingairloch | Highland | 766.1 | 226 | 2,513 | 741 | 49 | NM853563 | Ma,C,Sim |
| 214 | Beinn Liath Mhòr a' Ghiubhais | 14B: The Fannaichs | Highland | 766 | 281 | 2,513 | 922 | 20 | NH280713 | Ma,C,Sim |
| 215 | Dùn da Ghaoithe | 17E: Mull and Nearby Islands | Argyll and Bute | 765.5 | 658 | 2,511 | 2,159 | 49 | NM672362 | Ma,C,Sim |
| 216 | Bràigh nan Uamhachan | 10D: Mallaig to Fort William | Highland | 765 | 276 | 2,510 | 906 | 40 | NM975866 | Ma,C,Sim |
| 217 | Meall an Fhudair | 01D: Inveraray to Crianlarich | Argyll and Bute | 764.9 | 383 | 2,510 | 1,257 | 50 56 | NN270192 | Ma,C,Sim |
| 218 | Quinag - Spidean Coinich | 16E: Scourie to Lairg | Highland | 764.7 | 192.8 | 2,509 | 633 | 15 | NC206277 | Ma,C,Sim |
| 219 | Ben Loyal - An Caisteal | 16B: Durness to Loch Shin | Highland | 764.2 | 609 | 2,507 | 1,998 | 10 | NC578488 | Ma,C,Sim |
| 220 | Cnoc Còinnich | 19C: Loch Fyne to Bute and the Firth of Clyde | Argyll and Bute | 763.5 | 273.6 | 2,505 | 898 | 56 | NN233007 | Ma,C,Sim,xG |
| 221 | Little Wyvis | 15B: Loch Vaich to Moray Firth | Highland | 763 | 249 | 2,503 | 817 | 20 | NH429644 | Ma,C,Sim |
| 222 | Beinn na h-Uamha | 18B: Sunart and Ardgour | Highland | 762.4 | 269.2 | 2,501 | 883 | 40 | NM917664 | Ma,C,Sim |

== Bibliography ==
- G.Scott Johnstone; Donald J. Bennet; Hamish M. Brown; Rob Milne (2002). The Corbetts and Other Scottish Hills. Scottish Mountaineering Club. ISBN 978-0907521716.
- Alan Dawson; Dave Hewitt (1999). Corbett Tops and Corbetteers (TACit Tables). TACit Press. ISBN 978-0953437610.

== DoBIH codes ==
The DoBIH uses the following codes for the various classifications of mountains and hills in the British Isles, which many of the above peaks also fall into:

- Ma Marilyn
- Hu HuMP
- Sim Simm
- 5 Dodd
- M Munro
- MT Munro Top
- F Furth
- C Corbett
- G Graham
- D Donald
- DT Donald Top
- Hew Hewitt
- N Nuttall
- Dew Dewey
- DDew Donald Dewey
- HF Highland Five
- 4 400-499m Tump
- 3 300-399m Tump (GB)
- 2 200-299m Tump (GB)
- 1 100-199m Tump (GB)
- 0 0-99m Tump (GB)
- W Wainwright
- WO Wainwright Outlying Fell
- B Birkett
- Sy Synge
- Fel Fellranger
- CoH County Top – Historic (pre-1974)
- CoA County Top – Administrative (1974 to mid-1990s)
- CoU County Top – Current County or Unitary Authority
- CoL County Top – Current London Borough
- SIB Significant Island of Britain
- Dil Dillon
- A Arderin
- VL Vandeleur-Lynam
- MDew Myrddyn Dewey
- O Other list (which includes):
  - Bin Binnion
  - Bg Bridge
  - BL Buxton & Lewis
  - Ca Carn
  - CT Corbett Top
  - GT Graham Top
  - Mur Murdo
  - P500 P500
  - P600 P600
- Un unclassified

Prefixes: *s sub; *x deleted

Suffixes: = twin

== See also ==
- Lists of mountains and hills in the British Isles
- List of mountains of the British Isles by height
- Lists of mountains and hills in the British Isles
- Lists of mountains in Ireland
- List of Munro mountains
- List of Murdo mountains
- List of Furth mountains in the British Isles
- List of Marilyns in the British Isles
- List of P600 mountains in the British Isles
