= Aonach Buidhe =

Mountain in the Scottish Highlands

Coordinates: 57°20′27″N 05°13′49″W

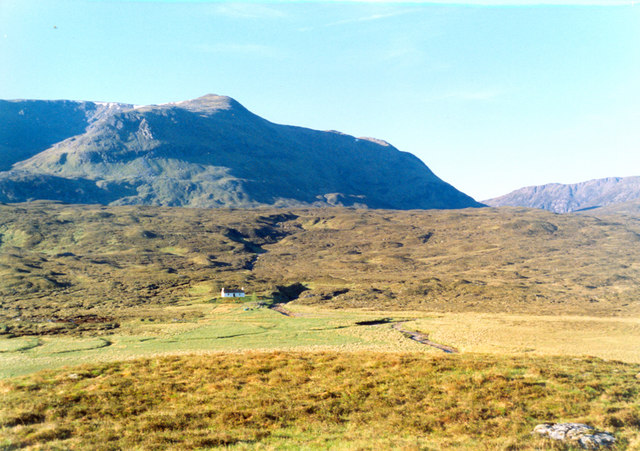
- Aonach Buidhe from the River Ling valley.

Highest point
- Elevation: 899 m (2,949 ft)
- Prominence: 474 m (1,555 ft)
- Listing: Corbett, Marilyn

Geography
- Location: Highland, Scotland
- Parent range: Northwest Highlands
- OS grid: NH057324
- Topo map: OS Landranger 25

Aonach Buidhe (899 m) is a remote mountain in the Northwest Highlands of Ross and Cromarty in northwest Scotland. The nearest village is Dornie.

The usual route is from the southeast which goes through Glen Elchaig.
