= Beinn Mhic Chasgaig =

Mountain in Highland, Scotland

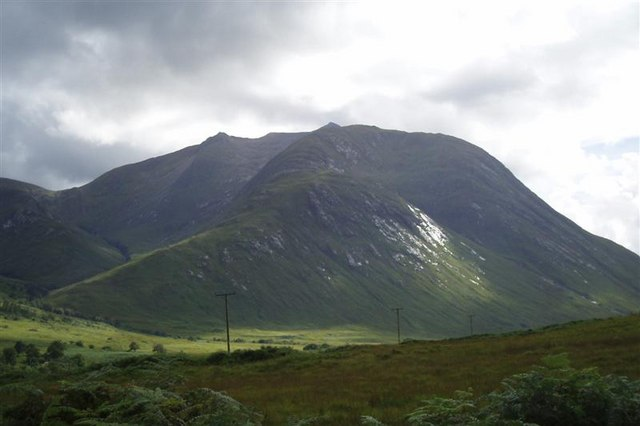
- Beinn Mhic Chasgaig

Highest point
- Elevation: 864 m (2,835 ft)
- Prominence: 166 m (545 ft)
- Listing: Corbett, Marilyn
- Coordinates: 56°36′35″N 4°54′00″W

Geography
- Location: Highland, Scotland
- Parent range: Grampian Mountains
- OS grid: NN221502
- Topo map: OS Landranger 41

Beinn Mhic Chasgaig (864 m) is a mountain in the Grampian Mountains of Scotland. It lies near the head of Glen Etive in Highland.

A steep and craggy peak, it is surrounded by high Munros and provides a very steep and challenging climb to its summit. Climbs start from Glen Etive.
