= Beinn Enaiglair =

Mountain in Scotland

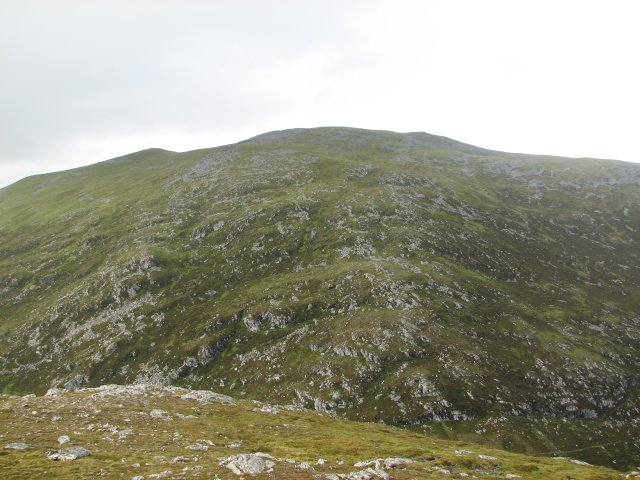
- Beinn Enaiglair

Highest point
- Elevation: 890 m (2,920 ft)
- Prominence: 234 m (768 ft)
- Listing: Corbett, Marilyn
- Coordinates: 57°46′44″N 4°59′12″W

Geography
- Location: Wester Ross, Scotland
- Parent range: Northwest Highlands
- OS grid: NH225805
- Topo map: OS Landranger 20

Beinn Enaiglair (890 m) is a mountain in Wester Ross, Scotland. It lies in the Northwest Highlands.

An outlier of the Beinn Dearg range, it is a mountain in its own right and rises to the east of the settlement of Auchindrean. The peak provides a view of the valley below from its summit.
