= Culardoch =

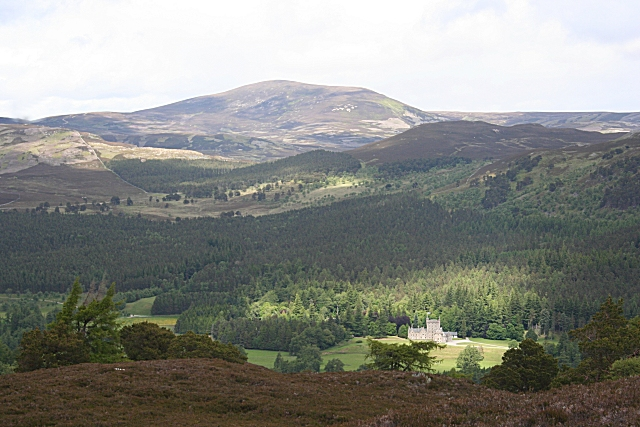
- Culardoch (in the distance) seen from near Braemar

Highest point
- Elevation: 900 m (3,000 ft)
- Prominence: 312 m (1,024 ft)
- Listing: Corbett, Marilyn
- Coordinates: 57°04′24″N 3°19′55″W

Geography
- Location: Aberdeenshire, Scotland
- Parent range: Cairngorms
- OS grid: NO193988
- Topo map: OS Landranger 36, 43

Culardoch (900 m) is a mountain in the Cairngorms of Scotland, located northeast of Braemar in Aberdeenshire.

A smooth and heathery peak southeast of the Munro Ben Avon, its summit provides wide views over Aberdeenshire.
