= Sgùrr na Feartaig =

Mountain in Scotland

Sgurr na Feartaig
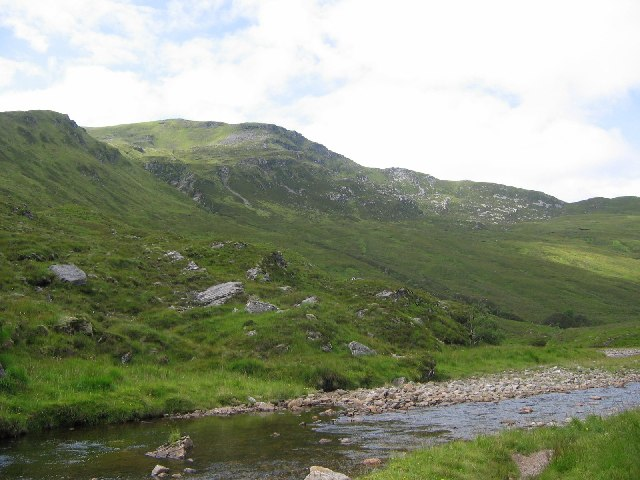
- Sgurr na Feartaig

Highest point
- Elevation: 863 m (2,831 ft)
- Prominence: 267 m (876 ft)
- Listing: Corbett, Marilyn
- Coordinates: 57°27′26″N 5°14′38″W

Geography
- Location: Wester Ross, Scotland
- Parent range: Northwest Highlands
- OS grid: NH055453
- Topo map: OS Landranger 25

Sgurr na Feartaig (863 m) is a mountain in the Northwest Highlands, Scotland. It is located northeast of Strathcarron in Wester Ross.

The mountain takes the form of a long ridge that dominates much of the southern side of Glen Carron. A stalker's path runs along the summit ridge.

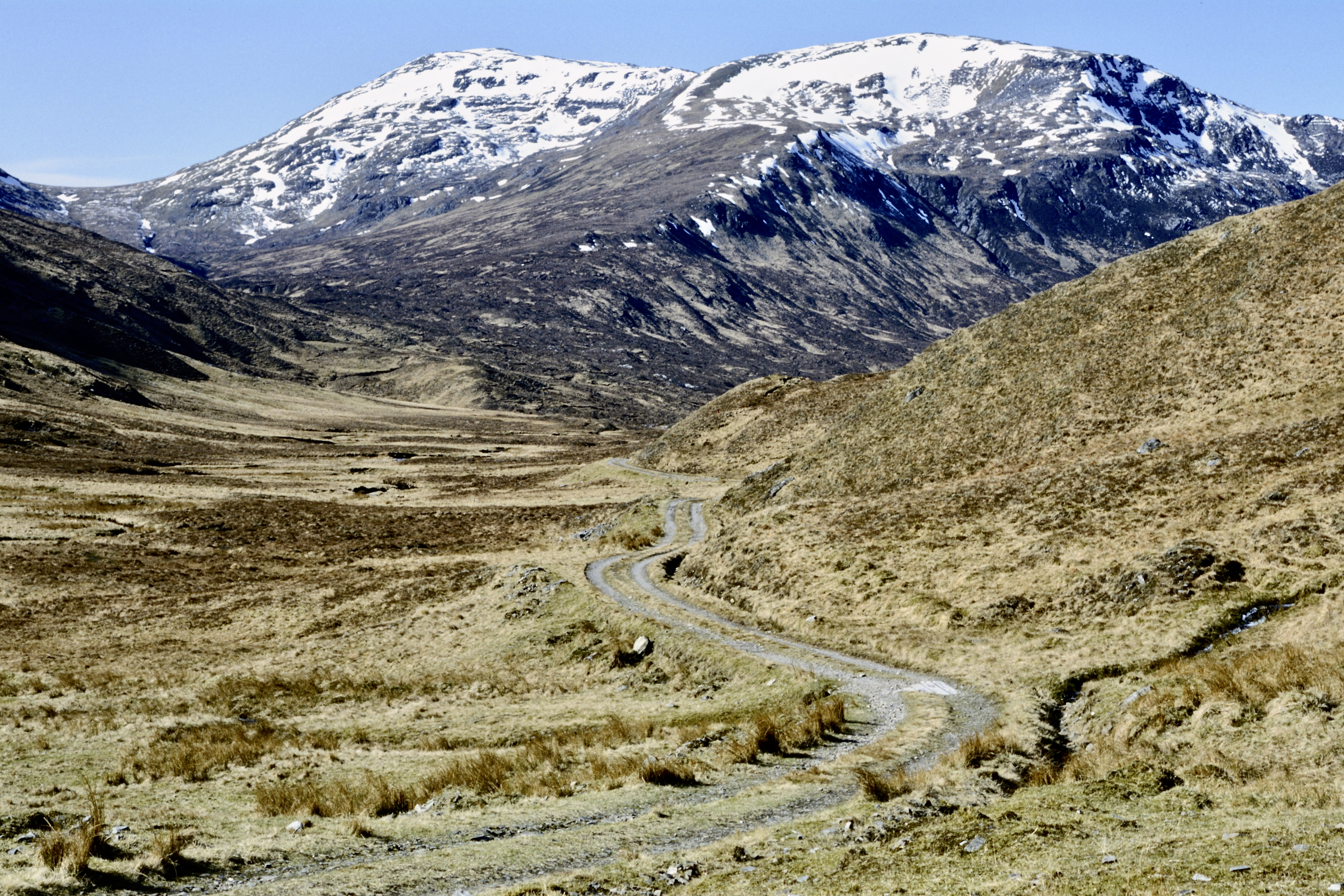
East aspect, summit to left
