= Dùn da Ghaoithe =

Mountain in Scotland

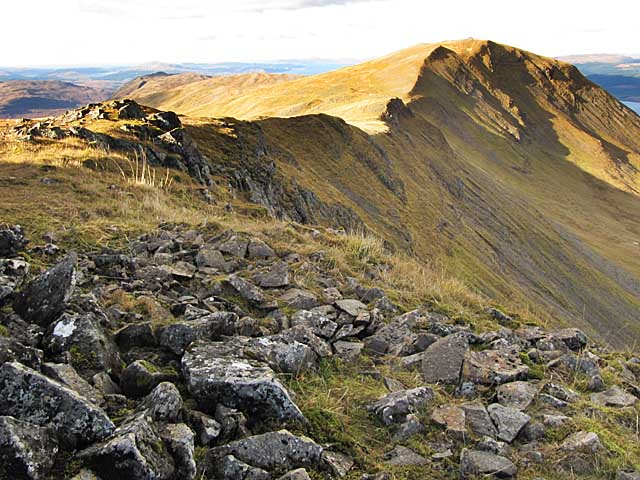

Highest point
- Elevation: 766 m (2,513 ft)
- Prominence: 659 m (2,162 ft)
- Parent peak: Ben More (Mull)
- Listing: Corbett, Marilyn
- Coordinates: 56°27′38″N 5°46′47″W

Naming
- Pronunciation: Scottish Gaelic: [ˈt̪uːn ˈt̪aː ˈɣɤjə]

Geography
- Location: Argyll and Bute, Scotland
- OS grid: NM672362
- Topo map: OS Landranger 49

Dùn da Ghaoithe (Scottish Gaelic: Dùn da Ghaoithe, meaning "fort of the two winds") is the second highest mountain on the Isle of Mull, western Scotland, and the island's only Corbett. It reaches 766 metres (2,513 ft) high, but "its long ridge and deep corries make it seem far higher". It boasts sea views "in almost every direction", and is the main mountain seen by visitors to the island on leaving the Caledonian MacBrayne ferry from Oban at Craignure.
