= Beinn a' Chòin =

Mountain in Scotland

Beinn a' Choin
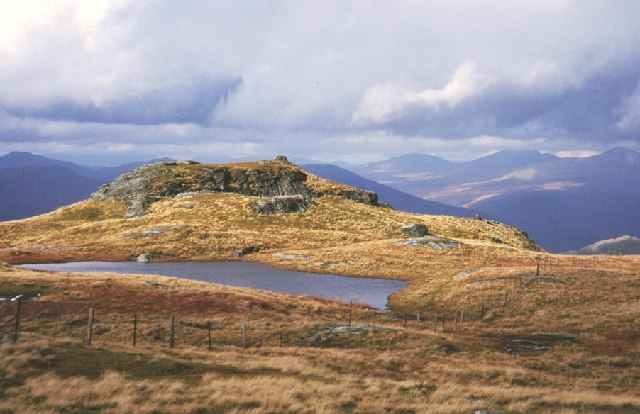
- Beinn a' Choin summit

Highest point
- Elevation: 769 m (2,523 ft)
- Prominence: 345 m (1,132 ft)
- Listing: Corbett, Marilyn
- Coordinates: 56°16′52″N 4°39′36″W

Geography
- Location: Stirling / Argyll and Bute, Scotland
- Parent range: Grampian Mountains
- OS grid: NN354130
- Topo map: OS Landranger 50, 56

Beinn a' Choin (769 m) is a mountain in the Grampian Mountains of Scotland. It lies on the border of the Stirling region and Argyll at the northern end of Loch Lomond.

A rugged and wild mountain of rocks and moorland lying north of Ben Lomond, it usually climbed from the small settlement of Inversnaid.
