= Sail Mhòr =

Sail Mhor
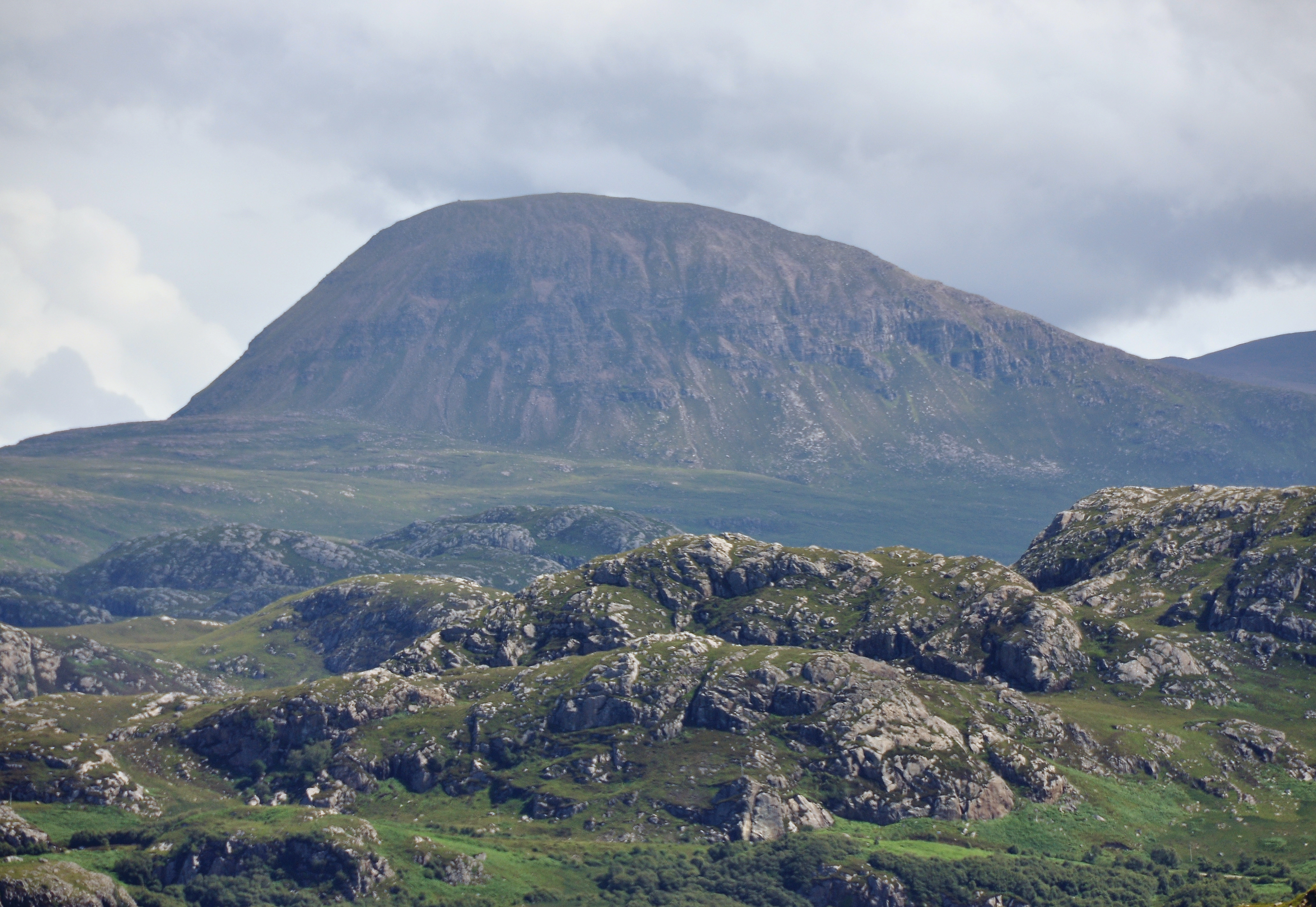
- Sail Mhor

Highest point
- Elevation: 767 m (2,516 ft)
- Prominence: 322 m (1,056 ft)
- Listing: Corbett, Marilyn
- Coordinates: 57°50′41″N 5°18′55″W

Geography
- Location: Wester Ross, Scotland
- Parent range: Northwest Highlands
- OS grid: NH032886
- Topo map: OS Landranger 19

Sail Mhor (767 m) is a mountain in the Northwest Highlands, Scotland. It lies in Wester Ross, close to the remote hamlet of Dundonnell and south of Ullapool.

Sail Mhor is at the western end of a long ridge that extends down from An Teallach. Lying just south of Little Loch Broom, the views from its summit towards the coast and to the Summer Isles beyond are fantastic.
