= Creagan na Beinne =

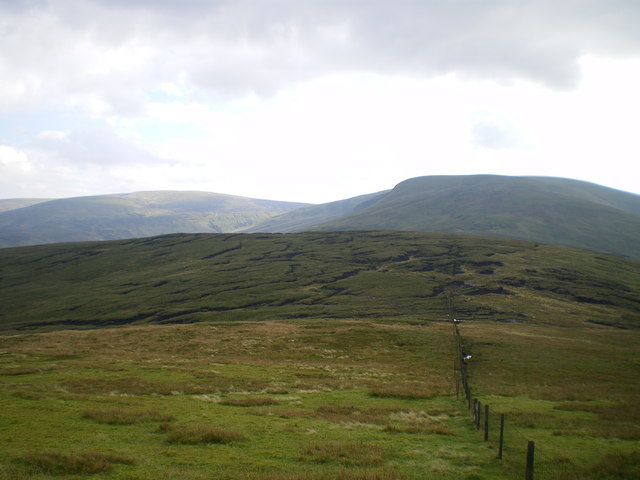
- Creagan na Beinne (on the right) from the ridge two miles to the north.

Highest point
- Elevation: 888 m (2,913 ft)
- Prominence: 455 m (1,493 ft)
- Parent peak: Ben Chonzie
- Listing: Corbett, Marilyn
- Coordinates: 56.5069°N 4.0417°W

Naming
- English translation: crags of the hill
- Language of name: Scottish Gaelic
- Pronunciation: Scottish Gaelic: [ˈkʰɾekən nə ˈpeiɲə]

Geography
- Location: Perth and Kinross, Scotland
- OS grid: NN744368

Creagan na Beinne is a hill in the Scottish Highlands lying to the south-east of Loch Tay in the group of rolling hills and moors whose highest point in Ben Chonzie. However Creagan na Beinne stands on the other side of Glen Almond from its parent and hence has a considerable relative height.

The hill is a large convex dome, deeply cut by corries. The whole area is grouse moors and sheep country. The easiest way up the hill is from the north-west where the hamlet of Ardtalnaig lies by the shore of Loch Tay; the north-west ridge is a possible line of ascent and so is following the Gleann a' Chilleine to Dunan and climbing the south ridge.
