= Beinn nan Oighreag =

Mountain in Scotland

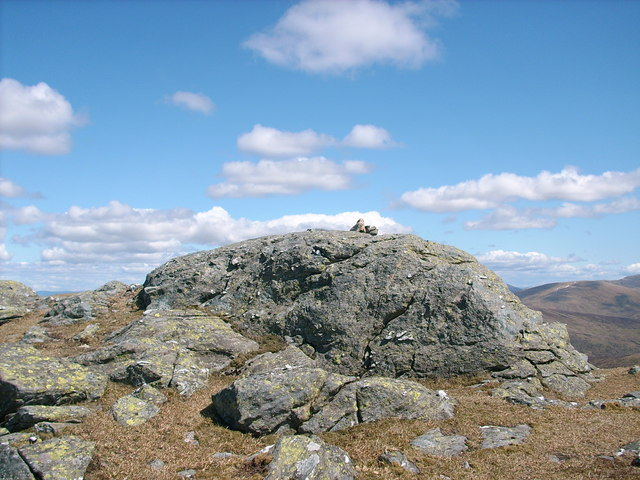
- The summit rock of Beinn nan Oighreag

Highest point
- Elevation: 910 m (2,990 ft)
- Prominence: 272 m (892 ft)
- Listing: Corbett, Marilyn
- Coordinates: 56°32′26″N 4°22′23″W

Geography
- Location: Perth and Kinross / Stirling, Scotland
- Parent range: Grampian Mountains
- OS grid: NN541411
- Topo map: OS Landranger 51

Beinn nan Oighreag (910 m) is a mountain in the Grampian Mountains of Scotland. It lies between Glen Lyon and Glen Lochay, on the border of Perthshire and Stirlingshire.

The mountain lies on a grassy ridge. Most walks start from Glen Lochay in the south. The closest village is Killin.
