= Bidein a' Chabair =

Mountain in Scotland

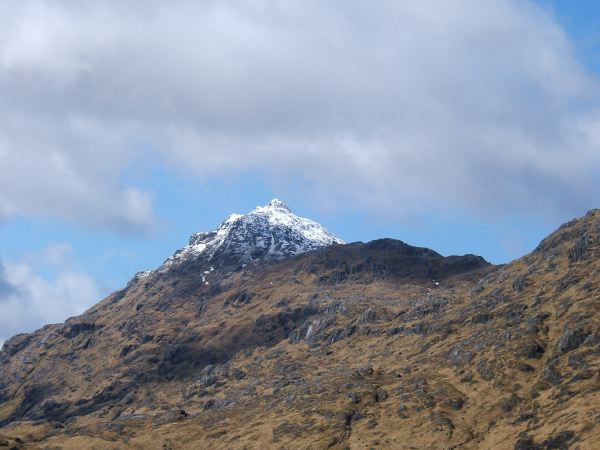
- Bidein a' Chabair in snow.

Highest point
- Elevation: 867 m (2,844 ft)
- Prominence: 552 m (1,811 ft)
- Listing: Corbett, Marilyn
- Coordinates: 56°58′48″N 5°28′39″W

Geography
- Location: Lochaber, Scotland
- Parent range: Northwest Highlands
- OS grid: NM889930
- Topo map: OS Landranger 33, 40

Bidein a' Chabair (867 m) is a mountain in the Knoydart peninsula, Lochaber, on the west coast of Scotland. It is part of the Northwest Highlands.

A conical peak, it lies in one of the most remote and rugged corners of Scotland. The nearest town is Fort William.
