= The Fara =

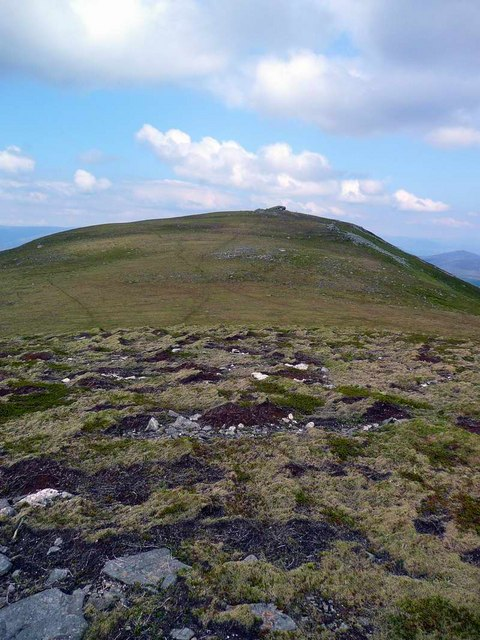
- Looking north on the Fara Ridge

Highest point
- Elevation: 911 m (2,989 ft)
- Prominence: 475 m (1,558 ft)
- Listing: Corbett, Marilyn
- Coordinates: 56°55′46″N 4°18′18″W

Geography
- Location: Highland, Scotland
- Parent range: Grampian Mountains
- OS grid: NN598842
- Topo map: OS Landranger 42

The Fara (911 m) is a mountain in the Grampian Mountains, Scotland, on the shore of Loch Ericht near the village of Dalwhinnie.

A large and bulky mountain, it rises high above Loch Ericht, and has a summit ridge that stretches for several miles from north to south. The mountain is fairly easy to climb and makes for an excellent vantage point.

The Fara just misses out on Munro status, by a height of only three metres.
