= Bràigh nan Uamhachan =

Mountain in Scotland

Coordinates: 56.927°N 5.330°W

Braigh nan Uamhachan
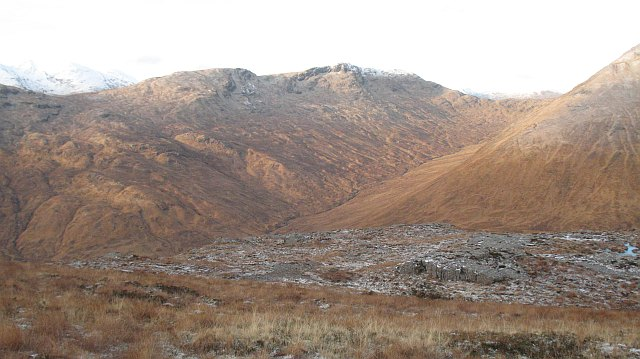
- Braigh nan Uamhachan

Highest point
- Elevation: 765 m (2,510 ft)
- Prominence: 276 m (906 ft)
- Listing: Corbett, Marilyn

Geography
- Location: Lochaber, Scotland
- Parent range: Northwest Highlands
- OS grid: NM975867
- Topo map: OS Landranger 40

Braigh nan Uamhachan (765 m) is a mountain in the Northwest Highlands of Scotland. It is located north of Glenfinnan in Lochaber.

Taking the form of a long ridge, the climb is steep and pathless, but provides fantastic views of all the neighbouring peaks from its summit.
