= Glas Bheinn (Kinlochleven) =

Coordinates: 56.736°N 4.849°W

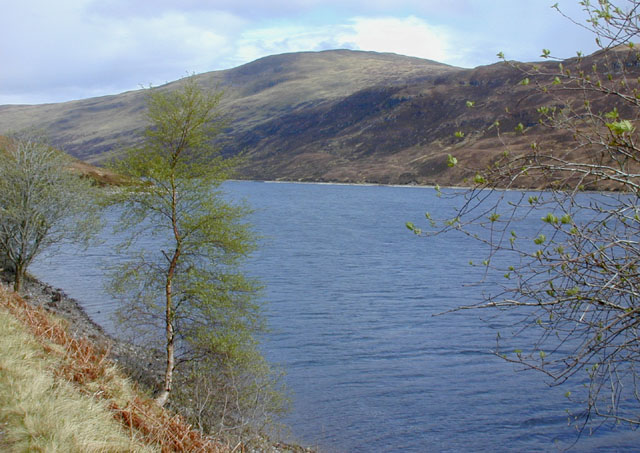
- Glas Bheinn from Loch Eilde Mor

Highest point
- Elevation: 792 m (2,598 ft)
- Prominence: 388 m (1,273 ft)
- Listing: Corbett, Marilyn

Geography
- Location: Lochaber, Scotland
- Parent range: Grampian Mountains
- OS grid: NN259641
- Topo map: OS Landranger 41

Glas Bheinn (792 m) is a mountain in the Grampian Mountains of Scotland, northeast of the village of Kinlochleven in Lochaber.

A remote wedge-shaped peak, it rises from the shore of Loch Eilde Mor opposite the high Mamores mountain range. Climbs usually start from Kinlochleven.
