= Beinn Airigh Charr =

Mountain in Scotland

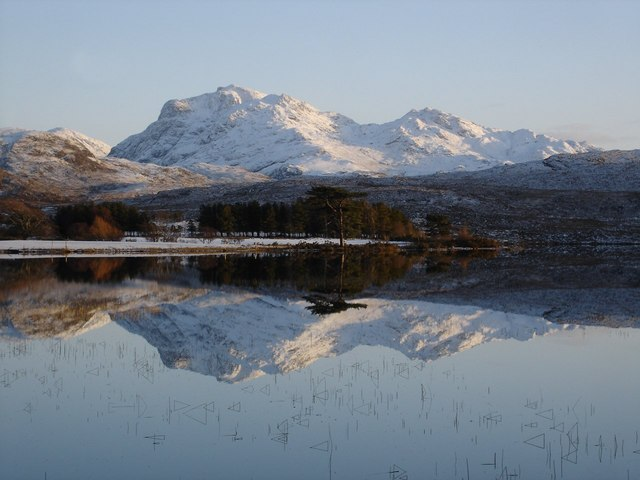
- Beinn Airigh Charr from Loch nan Dailthean

Highest point
- Elevation: 792 m (2,598 ft)
- Prominence: 477 m (1,565 ft)
- Listing: Corbett, Marilyn
- Coordinates: 57°43′39″N 5°28′39″W

Geography
- Location: Wester Ross, Scotland
- Parent range: Northwest Highlands
- OS grid: NG930761
- Topo map: OS Landranger 19

Beinn Airigh Charr (792 m) is a mountain in the Northwest Highlands of Scotland. It lies in Wester Ross, on the northern side of Loch Maree, near to the village of Poolewe.

The mountain is north of the wild Torridon Hills, and offers magnificent views from its summit.
