= Meallan Liath Coire Mhic Dhùghaill =

Mountain in Scotland

Meallan Liath Coire Mhic Dhughaill
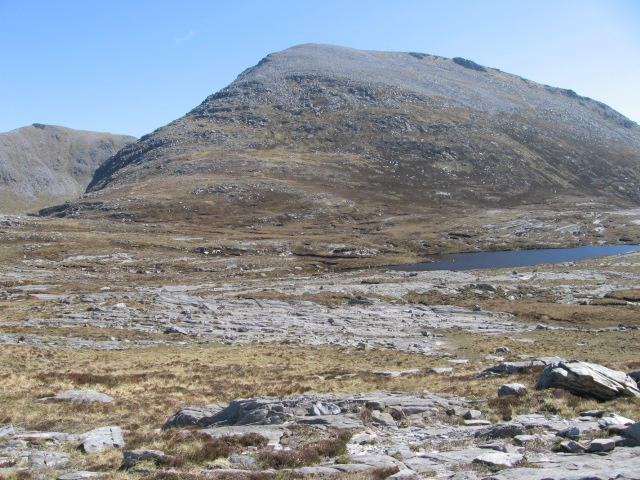
- Meall Liath Coire Mhic Dhughaill summit

Highest point
- Elevation: 801 m (2,628 ft)
- Prominence: 349 m (1,145 ft)
- Listing: Corbett, Marilyn
- Coordinates: 58°18′36″N 4°48′21″W

Geography
- Location: Sutherland, Scotland
- Parent range: Northwest Highlands
- OS grid: NC357391
- Topo map: OS Landranger 15

Meallan Liath Coire Mhic Dhughaill (801 m) is a mountain in the Northwest Highlands, Scotland. It lies in the far north of Scotland between Lairg and Durness in Sutherland.

Meallan Liath Coire Mhic Dhughaill is the hill with the longest name in Scotland.
