= Stob an Aonaich Mhòir =

Mountain in Scotland

Stob an Aonaich Mhoir
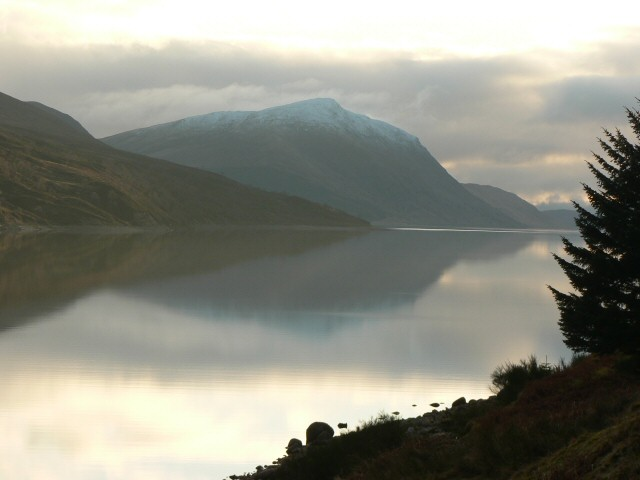
- Stob an Aonaich Mhoir from Loch Ericht

Highest point
- Elevation: 855 m (2,805 ft)
- Prominence: 230 m (750 ft)
- Listing: Corbett, Marilyn
- Coordinates: 56°47′36″N 4°23′47″W

Geography
- Location: Perthshire, Scotland
- Parent range: Grampian Mountains
- OS grid: NN537694
- Topo map: OS Landranger 42

Stob an Aonaich Mhoir (855 m) is a remote mountain in the Grampian Mountains of Scotland. It lies in Perthshire, on the eastern shore of Loch Ericht.

Due to its very remote location in the heart of the Grampians, a bicycle is recommended to reach the foot of the mountain, as the quickest route to it is from a private road from Loch Rannoch several miles to the south. The huge Ben Alder massif lies on the opposite side of Loch Ericht.
