= Ben Tirran =

Mountain in the Grampian Mountains of Scotland

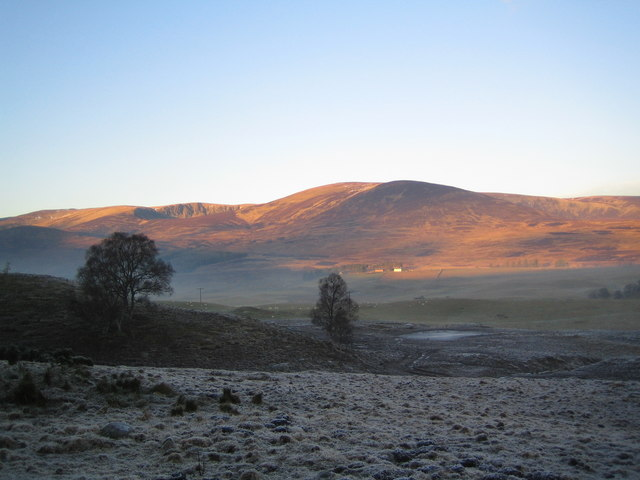
- Ben Tirran

Highest point
- Elevation: 896 m (2,940 ft)
- Prominence: 244 m (801 ft)
- Listing: Corbett, Marilyn
- Coordinates: 56°51′31″N 3°01′45″W

Geography
- Location: Angus, Scotland
- Parent range: Grampian Mountains
- OS grid: NO373746
- Topo map: OS Landranger 44

Ben Tirran (896 m) is a mountain in the Grampian Mountains of Scotland. It lies in the vast Mounth area of the eastern Highlands in Angus, on the northern side of Glen Clova.

A rounded peak, Ben Tirran is the highest point of a wide plateau. A number of lochans lie below its summit. The nearest town is Kirriemuir to the south.
