= Beinn Lair =

Mountain in Wester Ross, Highland, Scotland

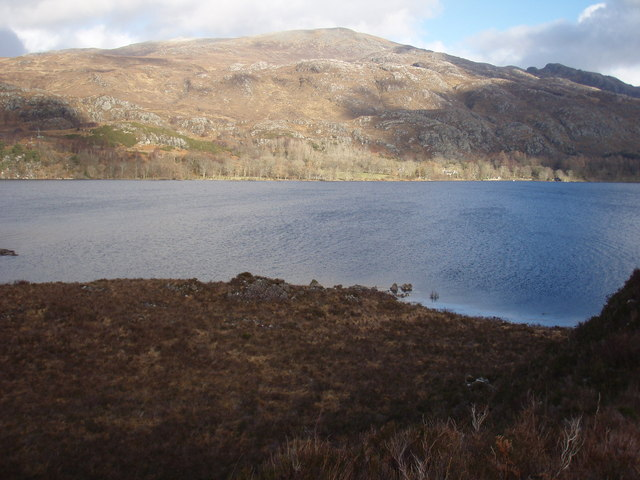
- Beinn Lair from Loch Maree

Highest point
- Elevation: 859 m (2,818 ft)
- Prominence: 455 m (1,493 ft)
- Listing: Corbett, Marilyn
- Coordinates: 57°42′14″N 5°23′21″W

Geography
- Location: Wester Ross, Scotland
- Parent range: Northwest Highlands
- OS grid: NG981732
- Topo map: OS Landranger 19

Beinn Lair (859 m) is a mountain in the Northwest Highlands, Scotland. It lies in the Letterewe estate on the northeastern shore of Loch Maree in Wester Ross.

The mountain has two contrasting sides. The Loch Maree side is one of gentle slopes to the summit, whereas its northern flank is one of giant cliffs looking straight down into the glen below.
