= Beinn Bhuidhe (Knoydart) =

Mountain in Highland, Scotland

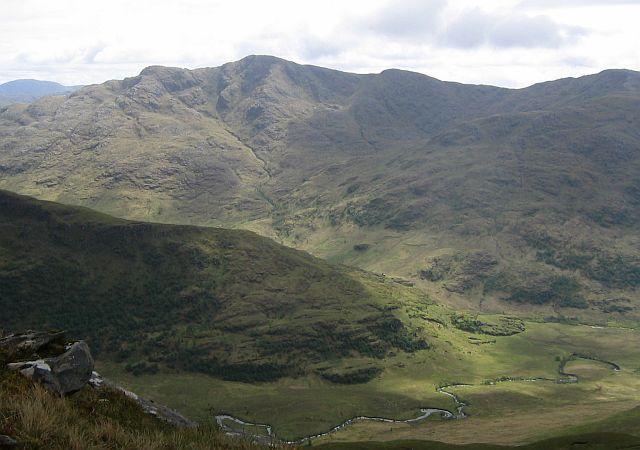
- Beinn Bhuidhe

Highest point
- Elevation: 855 m (2,805 ft)
- Prominence: 308 m (1,010 ft)
- Listing: Corbett, Marilyn
- Coordinates: 57°00′36″N 5°35′20″W

Geography
- Location: Lochaber, Scotland
- Parent range: Northwest Highlands
- OS grid: NM821967
- Topo map: OS Landranger 33, 40

Beinn Bhuidhe (855m) is a mountain in the Northwest Highlands of Scotland. It lies in a very remote area of Knoydart, Lochaber.

Lying on the north side of Loch Nevis, the nearest village is Inverie. It offers a walk to its summit.
