= Beinn Iaruinn =

805m high mountain in Highland, Scotland

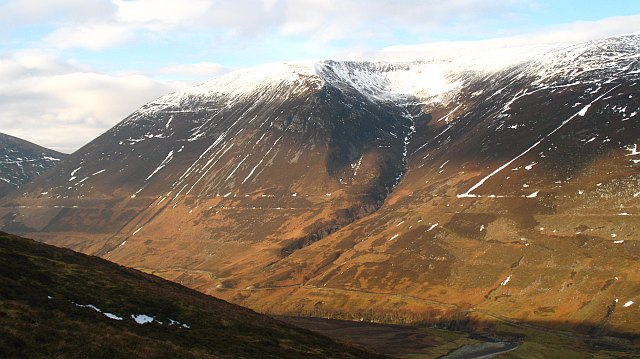
- Beinn Iaruinn, showing the natural 'Parallel Roads' feature on its slopes.

Highest point
- Elevation: 805 m (2,641 ft)
- Prominence: 466 m (1,529 ft)
- Listing: Corbett, Marilyn
- Coordinates: 56°58′13″N 4°48′14″W

Geography
- Location: Highland, Scotland
- Parent range: Grampian Mountains
- OS grid: NN297900
- Topo map: OS Landranger 34

Beinn Iaruinn (805 m) is a mountain in the Grampian Mountains, Scotland, northeast of the village of Spean Bridge.

It is one of a number of Corbetts that surround Glen Roy, and is famous for the natural 'Parallel Roads' feature on its slopes, an entirely natural feature.
