= Sgùrr a' Mhuilinn =

Mountain in Highland, Scotland

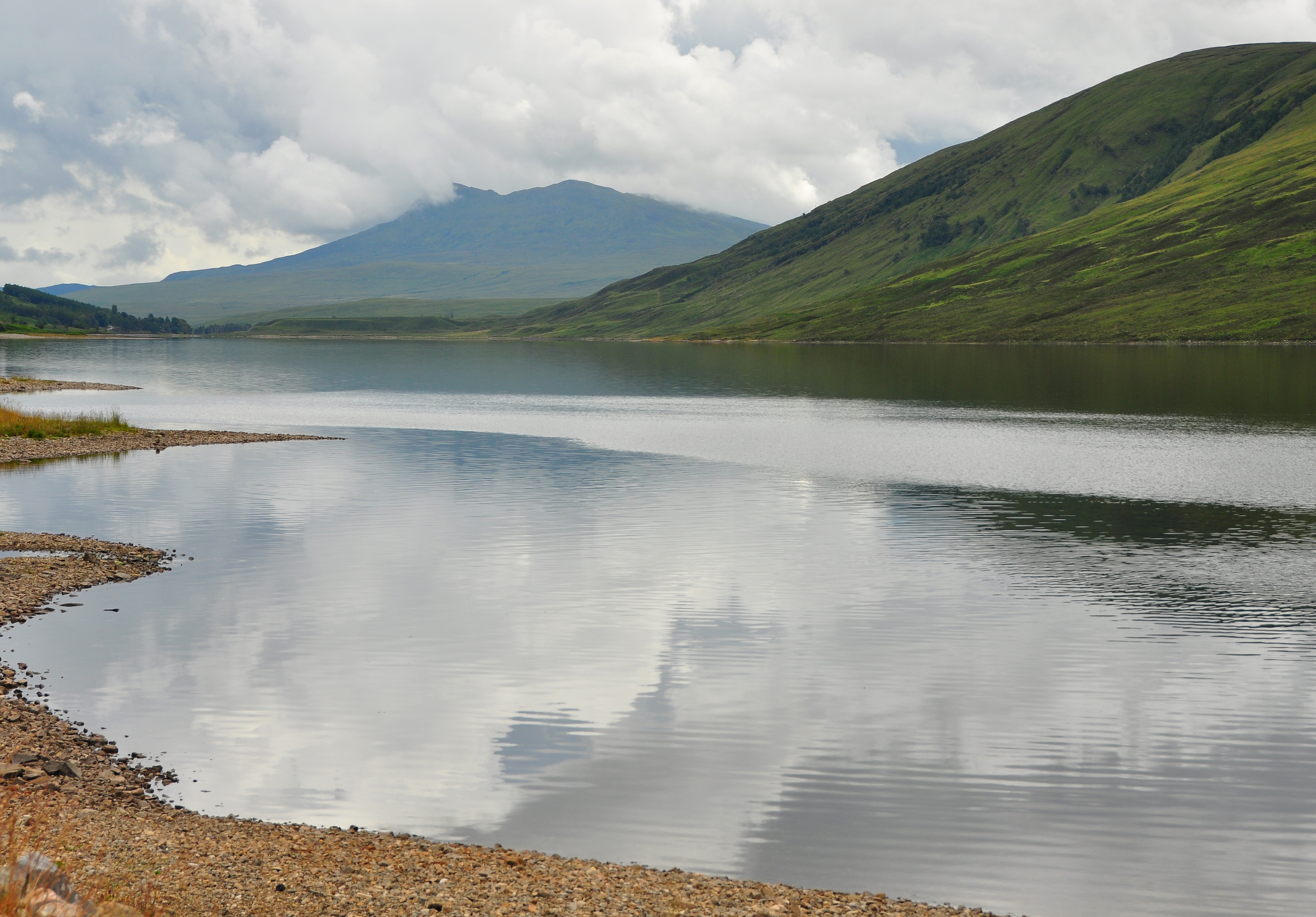
- Sgùrr a' Mhuilinn from the shore of Loch a' Chroisg

Highest point
- Elevation: 879 m (2,884 ft)
- Prominence: 580 m (1,900 ft)
- Listing: Corbett, Marilyn
- Coordinates: 57°33′30″N 4°54′06″W

Geography
- Location: Highland, Scotland
- Parent range: Northwest Highlands
- OS grid: NH264557
- Topo map: OS Landranger 25

Sgùrr a' Mhuilinn (879 m) is a mountain in Highland, Scotland. It lies in a remote location in the Northwest Highlands, approximately 40 miles (64 km) west of Inverness.
