= Meall Tàirneachan =

Mountain in Perth and Kinross, Scotland

Meall Tairneachan
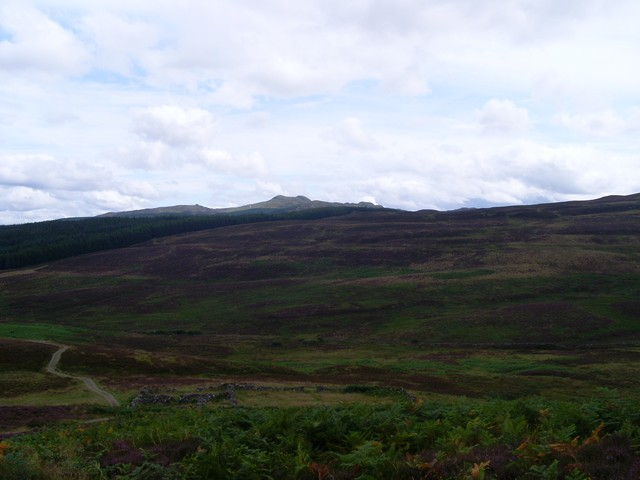
- Meall Tairneachan

Highest point
- Elevation: 787 m (2,582 ft)
- Prominence: 420 m (1,380 ft)
- Listing: Corbett, Marilyn
- Coordinates: 56°39′57″N 3°56′52″W

Geography
- Location: Perthshire, Scotland
- Parent range: Grampian Mountains
- OS grid: NN807543
- Topo map: OS Landranger 52

Meall Tairneachan (787 m) is a mountain in the Grampian Mountains of Scotland, located northwest of Aberfeldy in Perthshire.

The peak lies in an area of rocky and rolling moors between Loch Tummel and Aberfeldy. A baryte mine is located close to its summit.
