= Buidhe Bheinn =

Mountain in Scotland

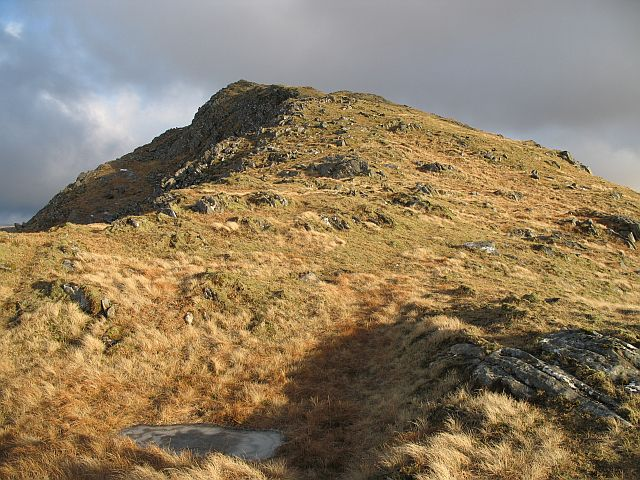
- Buidhe Bheinn

Highest point
- Elevation: 886 m (2,907 ft)
- Prominence: 160 m (520 ft)
- Listing: Corbett, Marilyn
- Coordinates: 57°07′38″N 5°21′59″W

Geography
- Location: Highland, Scotland
- Parent range: Northwest Highlands
- OS grid: NG963090
- Topo map: OS Landranger 33

Buidhe Bheinn (886 m) is a mountain in the Northwest Highlands of Scotland. It lies between Glen Shiel and Loch Hourn.

A rugged mountain, it can either be climbed from the Kinloch Hourn side or from Kintail to the north. Due to its remoteness, the peak makes for a long excursion in either direction.
