= Beinn Mhic-Mhonaidh =

Mountain in Argyll and Bute, Scotland

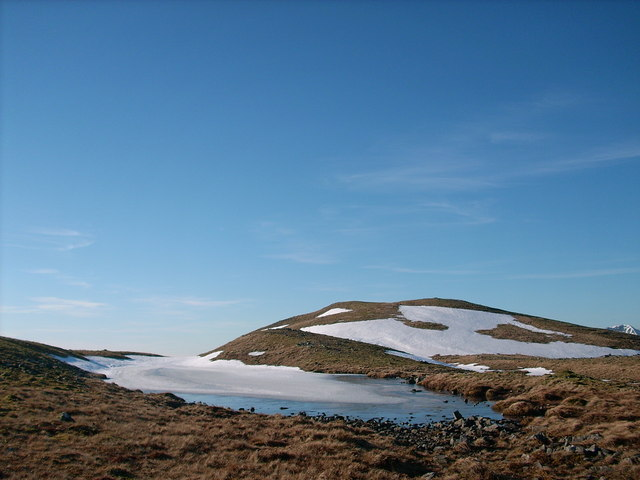
- Beinn Mhic-Mhonaidh summit

Highest point
- Elevation: 796 m (2,612 ft)
- Prominence: 420 m (1,380 ft)
- Listing: Corbett, Marilyn
- Coordinates: 56°28′23″N 4°54′35″W

Geography
- Location: Argyll and Bute, Scotland
- Parent range: Grampian Mountains
- OS grid: NN208350
- Topo map: OS Landranger 50

Beinn Mhic-Mhonaidh (796 m) is a mountain in the Grampian Mountains of Scotland, west of Glen Orchy in Argyll and Bute.

Climbs usually start from the Eas Urchaidh waterfall in Glen Orchy. The peak has forested lower slopes and provides superb views from its summit.
