= Sguman Coinntich =

Mountain in Scotland

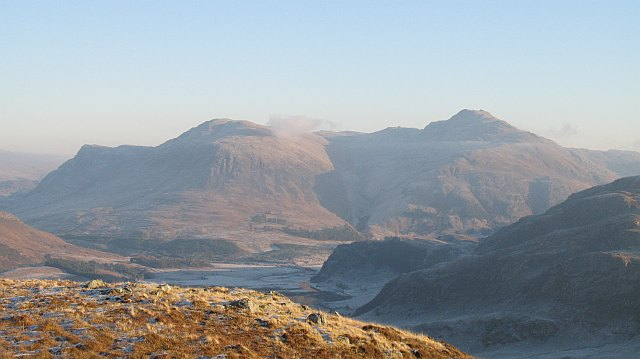
- Sguman Coinntich, with its twin Ben Killilan to the left.

Highest point
- Elevation: 879 m (2,884 ft)
- Prominence: 415 m (1,362 ft)
- Listing: Corbett, Marilyn
- Coordinates: 57°19′07″N 5°21′41″W

Geography
- Location: Ross and Cromarty, Scotland
- Parent range: Northwest Highlands
- OS grid: NG977303
- Topo map: OS Landranger 25

Sguman Coinntich (879 m) is a mountain in the Northwest Highlands, Scotland, east of the village of Dornie in Ross-shire.

Sguman Coinntich is the highest of twin peaks, its subsidiary top Ben Killilan rising to 756 m. The mountain rises above the head of Loch Long. The climb is mainly along rough terrain, but its summit makes for a fantastic viewpoint.
