= Beinn a' Chlaidheimh =

Mountain in Highland, Scotland

- Beinn a' Chlaidheimh (centre)

Highest point
- Elevation: 914 m (2,999 ft)
- Prominence: 268 m (879 ft)
- Listing: Corbett, Marilyn
- Coordinates: 57°44′43″N 5°15′35″W

Geography
- Location: Wester Ross, Scotland
- Parent range: Northwest Highlands
- OS grid: NH061775
- Topo map: OS Landranger 19

Beinn a' Chlaidheimh (Scottish Gaelic: "Hill of the Sword", 914 m) is a remote mountain in the Northwest Highlands, Scotland. It lies in the wild Dundonnell and Fisherfield Forest in Wester Ross.

A steep and distinctive shaped peak, it is often climbed as part of the "Fisherfield Six", in conjunction with five nearby Munros.

Beinn a' Chlaidheimh was listed as a Munro itself until 2012, however it was found to come up just 44 cm short of the required 914.40 m height required for a Munro, and was subsequently downgraded to Corbett status.
