= Beinn Dronaig =

Mountain in Scotland

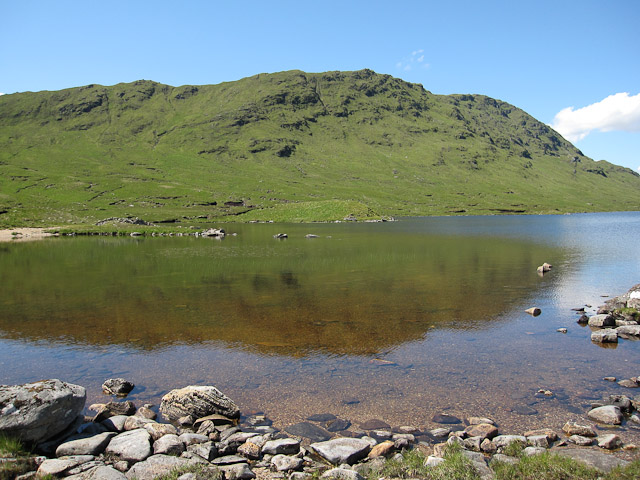
- Beinn Dronaig

Highest point
- Elevation: 797 m (2,615 ft)
- Prominence: 434 m (1,424 ft)
- Listing: Corbett, Marilyn
- Coordinates: 57°23′29″N 5°16′04″W

Geography
- Location: Wester Ross, Scotland
- Parent range: Northwest Highlands
- OS grid: NH037381
- Topo map: OS Landranger 25

Beinn Dronaig (797 m) is a mountain in the Northwest Highlands of Wester Ross, Scotland.

A remote peak northeast of the village of Dornie, it is located in one of the wildest parts of the Highlands, and provides fantastic views from its summit.
