= Càrn Chuinneag =

Mountain in the Scottish Highlands

Carn Chuinneag
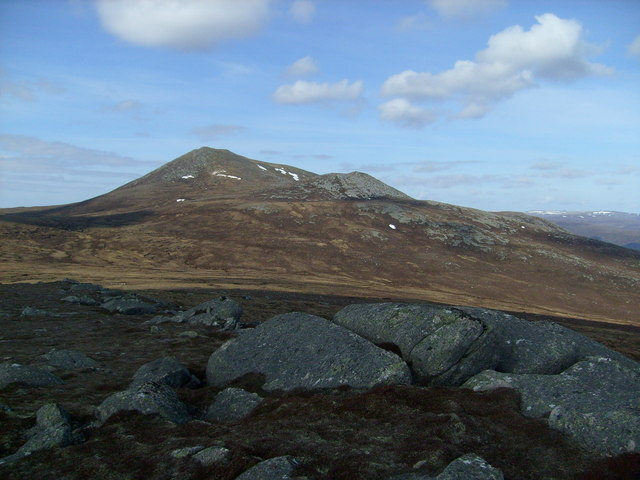
- Carn Chuinneag

Highest point
- Elevation: 839 m (2,753 ft)
- Prominence: 461 m (1,512 ft)
- Listing: Corbett, Marilyn
- Coordinates: 57°48′51″N 4°33′15″W

Geography
- Location: Sutherland, Scotland
- Parent range: Northwest Highlands
- OS grid: NH483833
- Topo map: OS Landranger 20

Carn Chuinneag (839 m) is a mountain in the Northwest Highlands of Scotland, south of Strathcarron in Sutherland.

A distinct twin-summited peak, it lies in a little visited but attractive corner of the Highlands. The nearest village is Ardgay
