= Beinn na h-Uamha =

Mountain in Ardgour, Highland, Scotland

Coordinates: 56.742°N 5.409°W

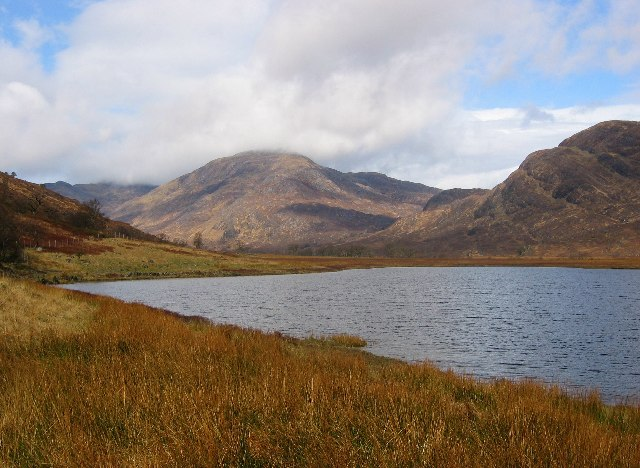
- Beinn na h-Uamha (centre)

Highest point
- Elevation: 762.4 m (2,501 ft)
- Prominence: 269 m (883 ft)
- Listing: Corbett, Marilyn

Geography
- Location: Lochaber, Scotland
- Parent range: Northwest Highlands
- OS grid: NM917664
- Topo map: OS Landranger 40

Beinn na h-Uamha (762.4 m) is a mountain in the Northwest Highlands of Scotland. It lies in the Ardgour area of Lochaber, west of the village of Corran and is the smallest Corbett in Scotland.

A steep and rugged peak, it provides fantastic views of Loch Linnhe and Sgùrr Dhòmhnuill from its summit.
