= Ben Hee =

Mountain in the United Kingdom

- A' Bheinn Shìth
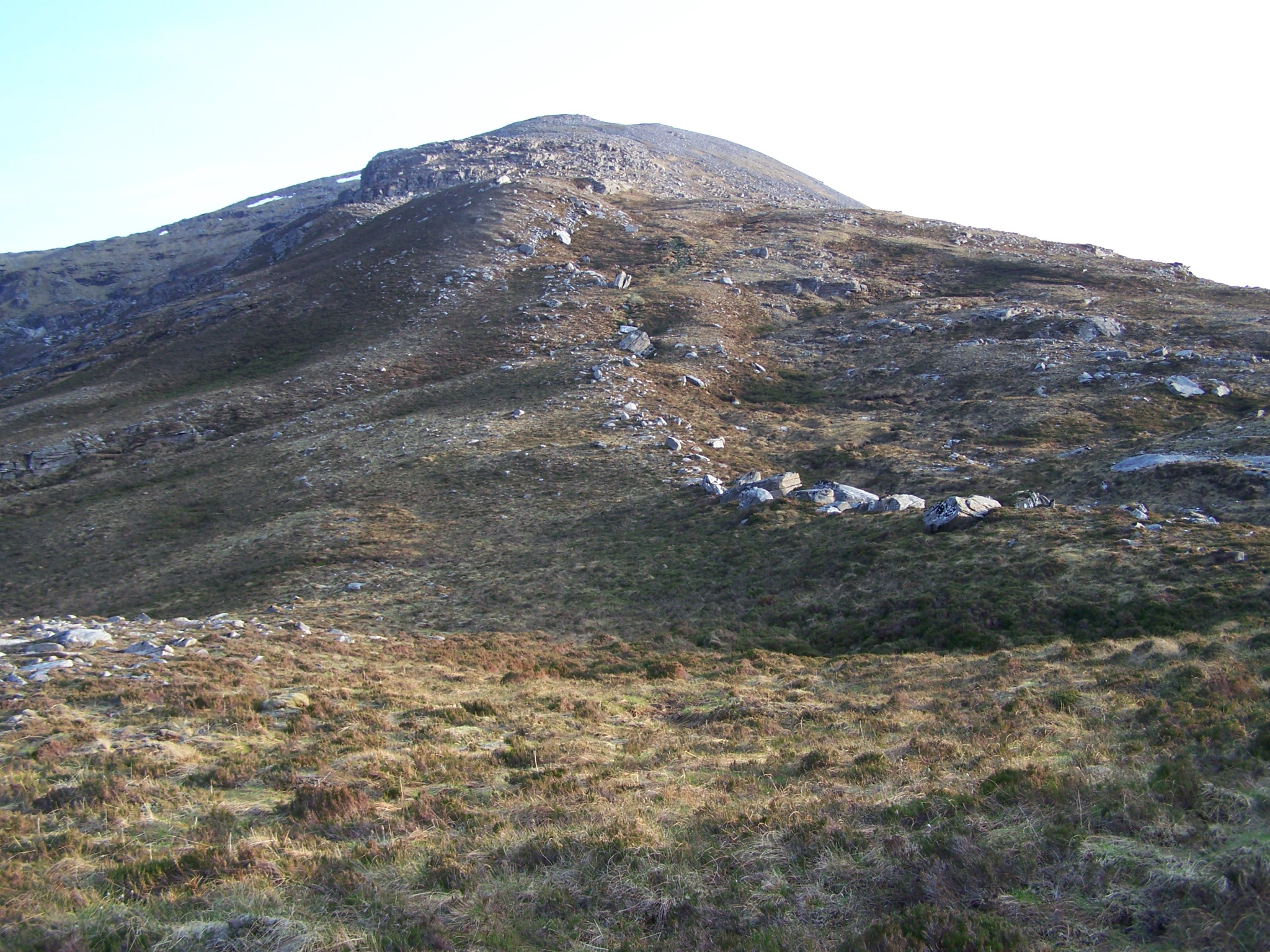
- Ben Hee

Highest point
- Elevation: 865.7 m (2,840 ft)
- Prominence: 607 m (1,991 ft)
- Listing: Corbett, Marilyn
- Coordinates: 58.2659°N 4.6839°W

Geography
- Location: Sutherland, Scotland
- Parent range: Northwest Highlands

Ben Hee (from Scottish Gaelic Beinn Shìth 'fairy mountain') is a mountain in Sutherland, Scotland that rises to 865.7 metres (2,840 ft).It is located very close to the A838 road, with some walks starting there.
