= Sgùrr a' Choire-bheithe =

Mountain in Lochaber, Northwest Highlands, Scotland

Sgurr a'Choire-bheithe
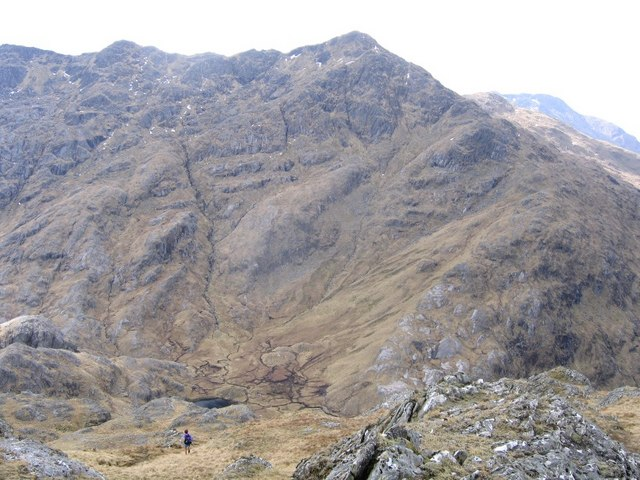
- Sgurr a' Choire-bleithe

Highest point
- Elevation: 913 m (2,995 ft)
- Prominence: 390 m (1,280 ft)
- Listing: Corbett, Marilyn
- Coordinates: 57°03′25″N 5°28′19″W

Geography
- Location: Lochaber, Scotland
- Parent range: Northwest Highlands
- OS grid: NG895015
- Topo map: OS Landranger 33

Sgùrr a' Choire-bleithe is a 913-m mountain in the remote Knoydart area of Lochaber, Northwest Highlands, Scotland.

It is one of highest Corbetts at 913.3 metres, and misses out on Munro status by just over one metre. The summit is the culminating point of a long and rugged ridge that stretches from Loch Quoich to Barrisdale Bay.
