= Sgùrr an Airgid =

Mountain in Ross and Cromarty, Scotland

Sgurr an Airgid
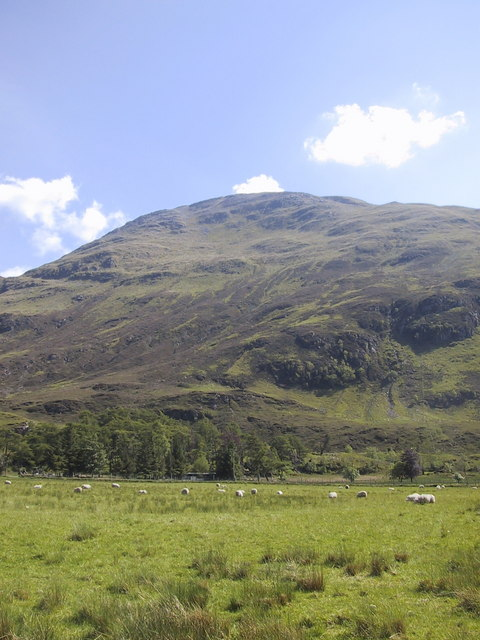
- Sgurr an Airgid

Highest point
- Elevation: 841 m (2,759 ft)
- Prominence: 394 m (1,293 ft)
- Listing: Corbett, Marilyn
- Coordinates: 57°14′55″N 5°24′57″W

Geography
- Location: Ross and Cromarty, Scotland
- Parent range: Northwest Highlands
- OS grid: NG940227
- Topo map: OS Landranger 25, 33

Sgurr an Airgid (841 m) is a mountain in the Northwest Highlands, Scotland. It lies on the northern shore of Loch Duich in Kintail.

Although the mountain is lower in height than many of its neighbours, it still offers excellent views from its summit. The path zig zags up to the top. The nearest main village is Dornie.
