= Breabag =

Mountain in the Northwest Highlands of Scotland

Coordinates: 58.097°N 4.909°W

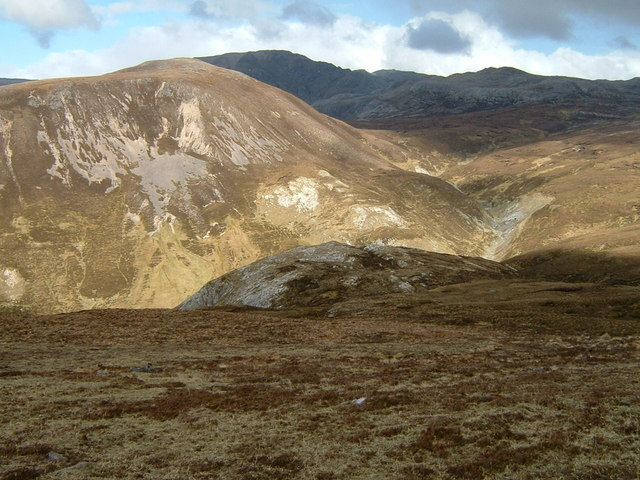
- Looking up towards Breabag from the west

Highest point
- Elevation: 815 m (2,674 ft)
- Prominence: 307 m (1,007 ft)
- Listing: Corbett, Marilyn

Geography
- Location: Sutherland, Scotland
- Parent range: Northwest Highlands
- OS grid: NC286157
- Topo map: OS Landranger 15

Breabag (815 m) is a mountain in the Northwest Highlands of Scotland, in the Assynt area of Sutherland.

A flat-topped summit, it is usually climbed from its western flank, where the Bone Caves of Assynt are located. The nearest settlement is Inchnadamph.
