= Meall an Fhudair =

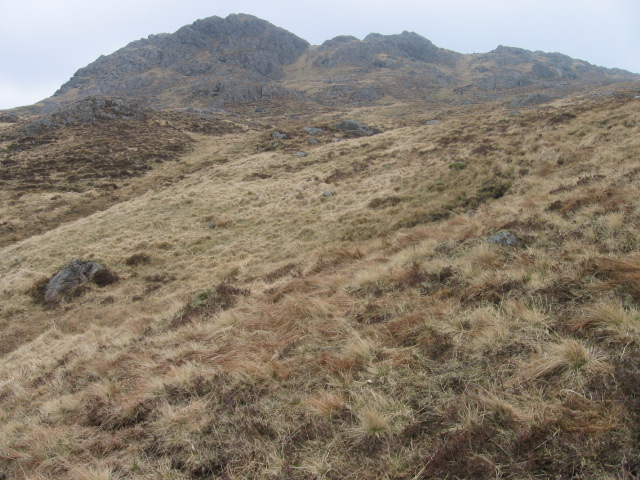
- Meall an Fhudair

Highest point
- Elevation: 764 m (2,507 ft)
- Prominence: 382 m (1,253 ft)
- Listing: Corbett, Marilyn
- Coordinates: 56°20′02″N 4°47′56″W

Geography
- Location: Argyll and Bute, Scotland
- Parent range: Grampian Mountains
- OS grid: NN270192
- Topo map: OS Landranger 50, 56

Meall an Fhudair (764 m) is a mountain in the Grampian Mountains, Scotland. It lies immediately north of the Arrochar Alps, near to the small village of Inverarnan.

A sprawling and wild mountain, it offers fine views from its summit. Walks usually start from the main A82 road just to the east.
