= Stob Coire a' Chearcaill =

Mountain in Highland, Scotland

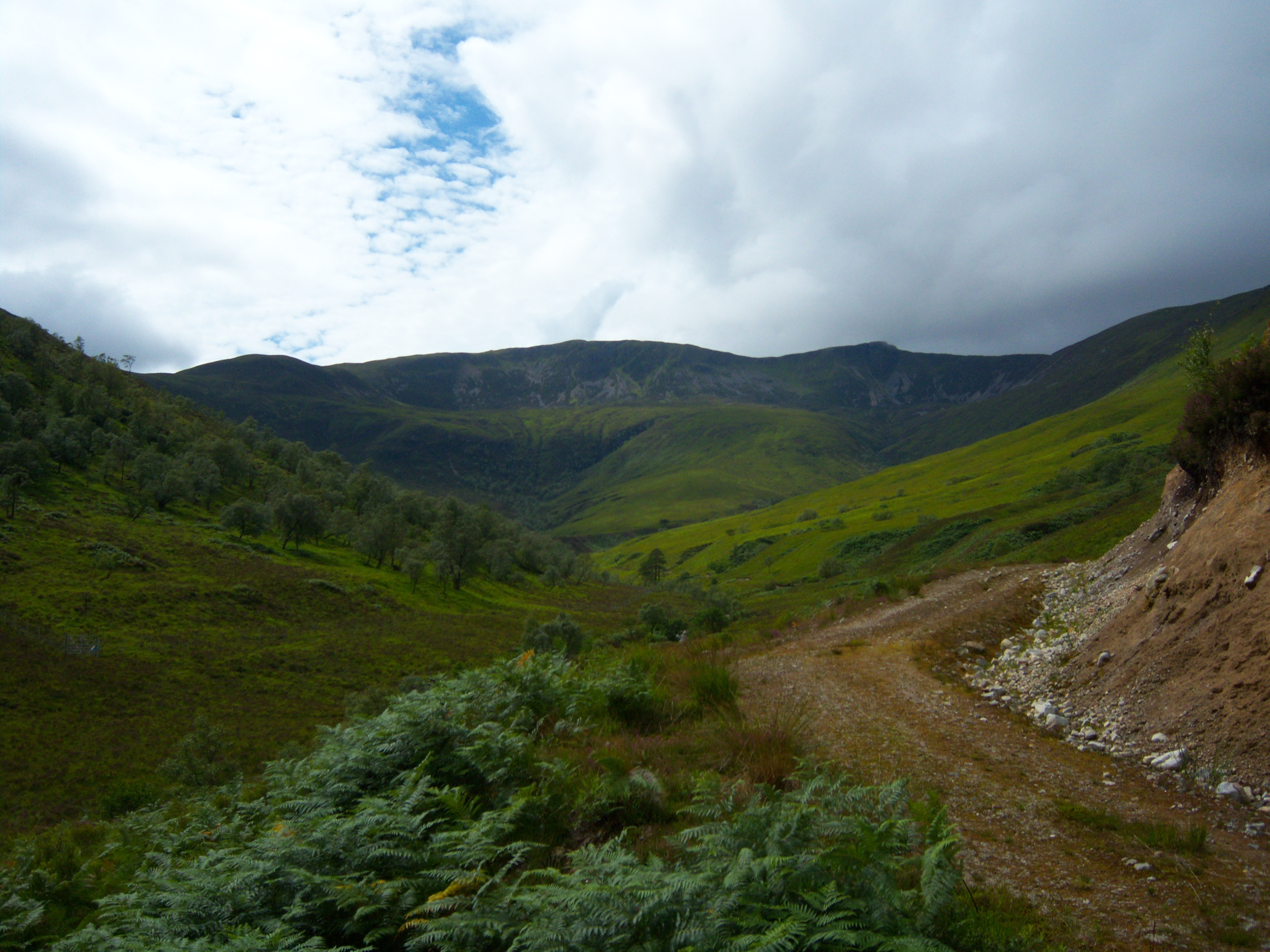
- Stob Coire a' Chearcaill

Highest point
- Elevation: 771 m (2,530 ft)
- Prominence: 575 m (1,886 ft)
- Listing: Corbett, Marilyn
- Coordinates: 56°48′11″N 5°14′58″W

Geography
- Location: Lochaber, Scotland
- Parent range: Northwest Highlands
- OS grid: NN016726
- Topo map: OS Landranger 41

Stob Coire a' Chearcaill (771 m) is a mountain in the Northwest Highlands, Scotland. It lies west of Loch Linnhe in Lochaber.

The peak is a familiar sight from Fort William, from where it can be seen across the Loch. The easiest route to the summit is from the small settlement of Blaich, and the views are excellent from the top.
