= Creach Bheinn (Loch Creran) =

Mountain in Scotland

Coordinates: 56.531°N 5.215°W

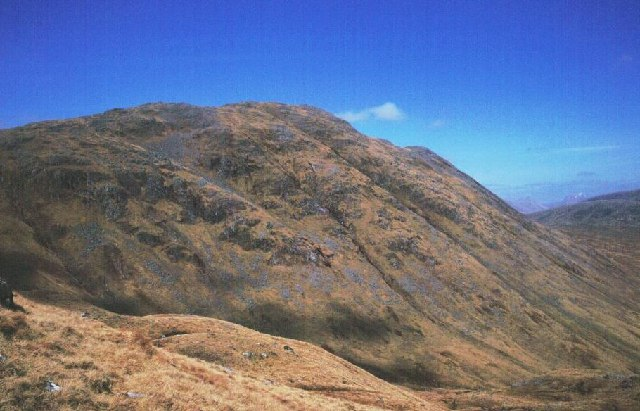
- The eastern face of Creach Bheinn

Highest point
- Elevation: 810 m (2,660 ft)
- Prominence: 245 m (804 ft)
- Listing: Corbett, Marilyn

Geography
- Location: Argyll, Scotland
- Parent range: Grampian Mountains
- OS grid: NN023422
- Topo map: OS Landranger 50

Creach Bheinn (810 m) is a mountain in the Grampian Mountains of Scotland. It rises above the head Loch Creran in Argyll.

A large and sprawling peak, a bulldozed track leads the way up to the ridge from Loch Creran. Some steep sections lie near the top. The islands of Lismore and Mull are clearly visible from its summit, as are the mountains around Glen Coe. The nearest village is Taynuilt to the south.
