= Fraochaidh =

Coordinates: 56.615398°N 5.213830°W

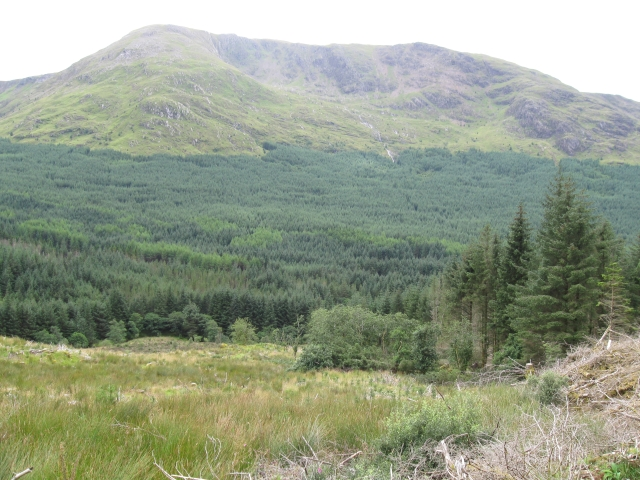
- Fraochaidh, showing its forested lower slopes.

Highest point
- Elevation: 879 m (2,884 ft)
- Prominence: 551 m (1,808 ft)
- Listing: Corbett, Marilyn

Geography
- Location: Highland and Argyll and Bute, Scotland
- Parent range: Grampian Mountains
- OS grid: NN029517
- Topo map: OS Landranger 41

Fraochaidh (879 m) is a mountain in the Grampian Mountains, located between Glen Coe and Oban on the west coast of Scotland. It lies on the border of Highland and Argyll and Bute.

A steep sided mountain, many of its approaches are covered in thick forest plantations. The best route to the summit is from the Glen Coe side to its north.
