= Mount Battock =

Mountain in Scotland

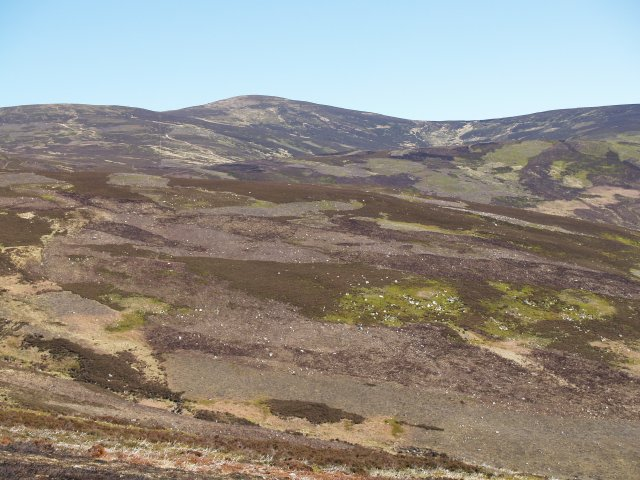
- Mount Battock

Highest point
- Elevation: 778 m (2,552 ft)
- Prominence: 286 m (938 ft)
- Listing: Corbett, Marilyn
- Coordinates: 56°56′57″N 2°44′31″W

Geography
- Location within Scotland
- Location: Aberdeenshire / Angus, Scotland
- Parent range: Grampian Mountains
- OS grid: NO54968445
- Topo map: OS Landranger 44

Mount Battock (778 m) is a mountain in the Mounth on the eastern edge of the Scottish Highlands, on the border between Aberdeenshire and Angus.

A rounded peak, it is located on the northern side of Glen Esk, and is the most easterly Corbett, also making it the most easterly mountain in Scotland. The nearest settlement is Tarfside.
