= Càrn na Nathrach =

Mountain in the Highlands of Scotland

Carn na Nathrach
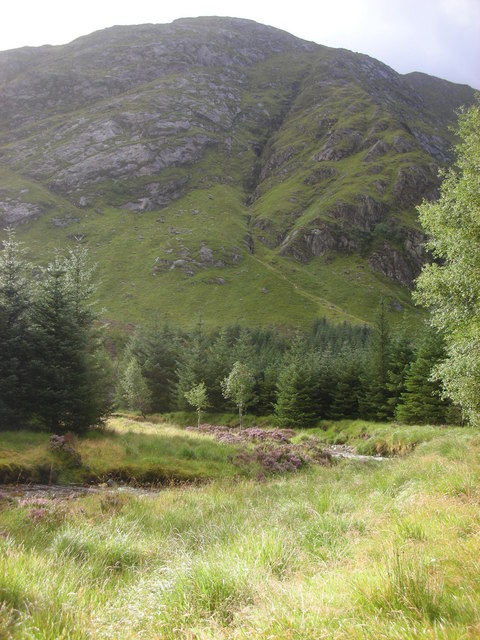
- Carn na Nathrach

Highest point
- Elevation: 786 m (2,579 ft)
- Prominence: 382 m (1,253 ft)
- Listing: Corbett, Marilyn
- Coordinates: 56°46′22″N 5°27′36″W

Geography
- Location: Lochaber, Scotland
- Parent range: Northwest Highlands
- OS grid: NM886698
- Topo map: OS Landranger 40

Carn na Nathrach (786 m) is a mountain in the Northwest Highlands of Scotland. It is located in the Ardgour area of Lochaber.

A very remote mountain, it takes the form of a rugged ridge and is usually climbed from Loch Doilet to the west.
