= Beinn Leoid =

Mountain in Scotland

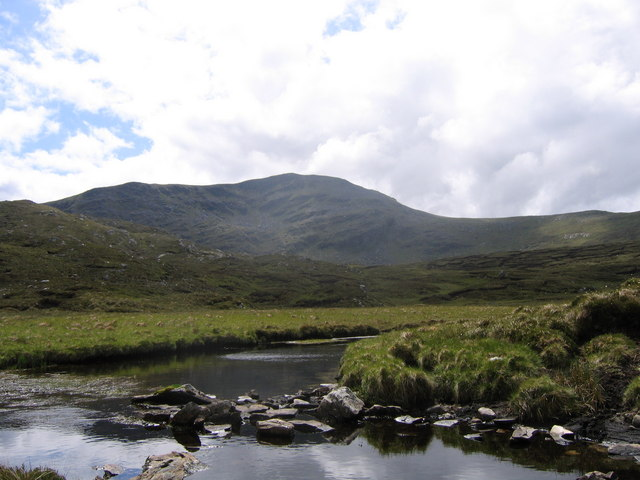
- Beinn Leoid

Highest point
- Elevation: 792 m (2,598 ft)
- Prominence: 495 m (1,624 ft)
- Listing: Corbett, Marilyn
- Coordinates: 58°13′19″N 4°51′41″W

Geography
- Location: Sutherland, Scotland
- Parent range: Northwest Highlands
- OS grid: NC320294
- Topo map: OS Landranger 15

Beinn Leoid (792 m) is a mountain in the Northwest Highlands of Scotland. It lies in Sutherland, east of the village of Kylesku.

A very remote mountain, it provides fine views towards the coast from its summit.
