= Stob Dubh (Corbett) =

Mountain in Scotland

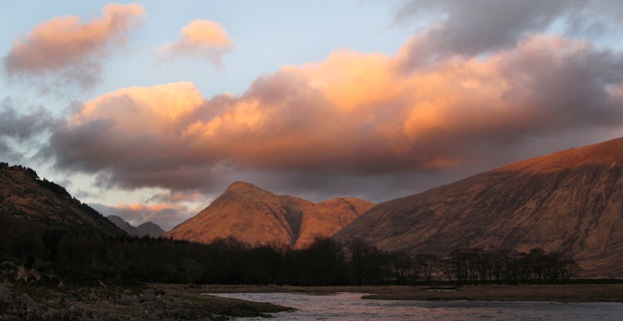
- Stob Dubh from Loch Etive

Highest point
- Elevation: 883 m (2,897 ft)
- Prominence: 521 m (1,709 ft)
- Listing: Corbett, Marilyn
- Coordinates: 56°35′42″N 4°59′18″W

Geography
- Location: Highland, Scotland
- Parent range: Grampian Mountains
- OS grid: NN166488
- Topo map: OS Landranger 50

Stob Dubh (880 m) is a mountain in the Grampian Mountains of Scotland, at the head of Loch Etive north of the village of Taynuilt.

The mountain offers excellent hillwalking opportunities, and even though it is tough going in places, it is possible to reach the summit without any scrambling.
