= Meall a' Ghiubhais =

Northwest Highlands mountain

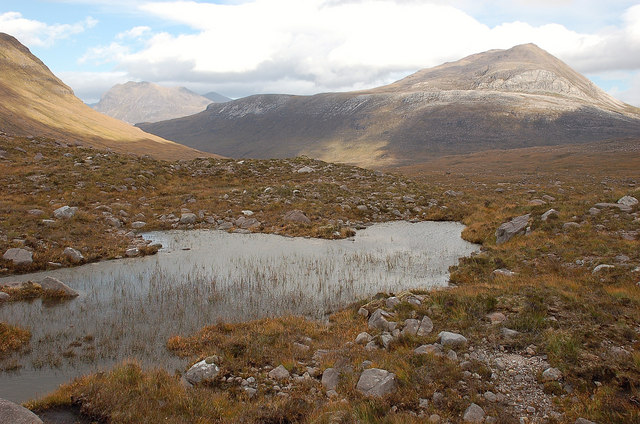
- Meall a' Ghiubhais is the main peak on the right.

Highest point
- Elevation: 887 m (2,910 ft)
- Prominence: 418 m (1,371 ft)
- Listing: Corbett, Marilyn
- Coordinates: 57°36′56″N 5°23′24″W

Geography
- Location: Wester Ross, Scotland
- Parent range: Northwest Highlands
- OS grid: NG976634
- Topo map: OS Landranger 19

Meall a' Ghiubhais (887 m) is a mountain in the Northwest Highlands, Scotland. It lies in Wester Ross, close to the village of Kinlochewe.

The mountain is a steep, rugged peak, with a straightforward if pathless, unmarked climb to its summit from the Beinn Eighe Nature Reserve circular path. From the top, the views are spectacular, with Beinn Eighe and Slioch across Loch Maree prominent landmarks.
