= Meall Buidhe (Corbett) =

- Location within Scotland

Highest point
- Elevation: 908.4 m (2,980 ft)
- Prominence: 259 m (850 ft)
- Parent peak: Meall Buidhe
- Listing: Corbett; Marilyn
- Coordinates: 56°34′10″N 4°33′48″W

Naming
- English translation: Yellow hill
- Language of name: Gaelic
- Pronunciation: Scottish Gaelic: [ˈmjaul̪ˠ ˈpujə]

Geography
- Location: Perth and Kinross/Argyll and Bute, Scotland
- OS grid: NN426449
- Topo map: OS Landranger 51

Meall Buidhe is a Corbett situated in the southern highlands of Scotland. It forms part of the ridge line separating Glen Daimh, an offshoot of Glen Lyon from Glen Lyon itself. There is another hill called Meall Buidhe in the Glen Lyon area, about 8 km (5 mi) to the northeast.

Its elevation is 908.4 m (2,980 ft) and its prominence is 259 m (850 ft), and it is classed as a Corbett and a Marilyn.
