= Creag Rainich =

Mountain in the Northwest Highlands, Scotland

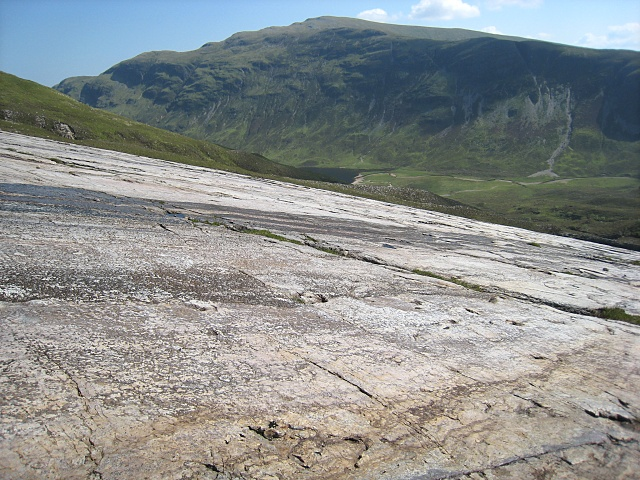
- Creag Rainich

Highest point
- Elevation: 807 m (2,648 ft)
- Prominence: 451 m (1,480 ft)
- Listing: Corbett, Marilyn
- Coordinates: 57°43′32″N 5°11′53″W

Geography
- Location: Highland, Scotland
- Parent range: Northwest Highlands
- OS grid: NH096751
- Topo map: OS Landranger 19

Creag Rainich (807 m) is a remote mountain in the Northwest Highlands, Scotland, southwest of Ullapool. An isolated peak, its position provides fine views from its summit.
