= Beinn Each =

Mountain in Stirling, Scotland

Coordinates: 56.314°N 4.263°W

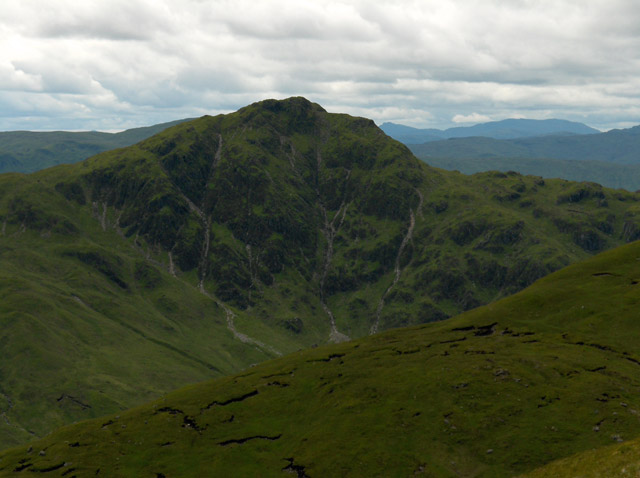
- Beinn Each

Highest point
- Elevation: 813 m (2,667 ft)
- Prominence: 158 m (518 ft)
- Listing: Corbett, Marilyn

Geography
- Location: Stirling, Scotland
- Parent range: Grampian Mountains
- OS grid: NN602158
- Topo map: OS Landranger 57

Beinn Each (813 m) is a mountain in the southern Grampian Mountains of Scotland. It is located in Stirlingshire, north of the town of Callander.

Rising steeply from the valley below, it makes for a straightforward climb from the nearby Loch Lubnaig and is often climbed in conjunction with the nearby Munro Stùc a' Chroin.
