= Aonach Shasuinn =

Mountain in the Highlands of Scotland

Coordinates: 57.216°N 5.027°W

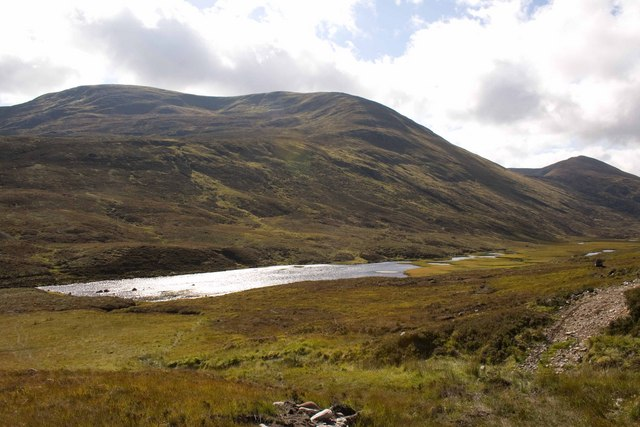
- Aonach Shasuinn

Highest point
- Elevation: 888 m (2,913 ft)
- Prominence: 237 m (778 ft)
- Listing: Corbett, Marilyn

Geography
- Location: Inverness-shire, Scotland
- Parent range: Northwest Highlands
- OS grid: NH173180
- Topo map: OS Landranger 34

Aonach Shasuinn (888 m) is a mountain in the Northwest Highlands of Scotland. It is in Inverness-shire, on the southern side of Glen Affric.

Taking the form of a steep-sided ridge, the peak can be climbed either from Glen Affric or Glen Moriston in the south. The nearest village is Cannich.
