= Meall an t-Seallaidh =

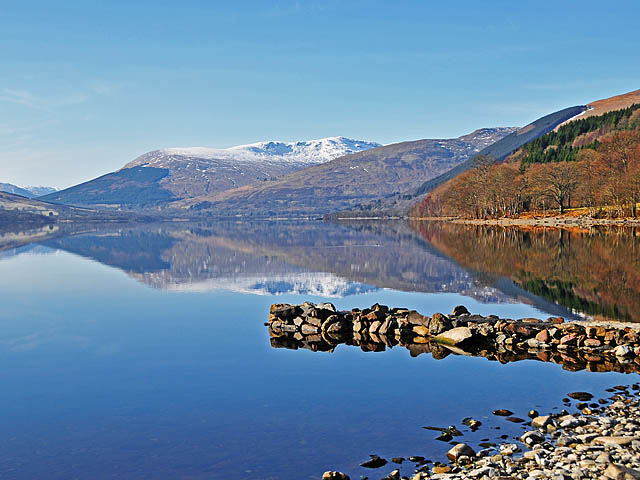
- A snow-capped Meall an t-Seallaidh from Loch Earn

Highest point
- Elevation: 852 m (2,795 ft)
- Prominence: 427 m (1,401 ft)
- Listing: Corbett, Marilyn
- Coordinates: 56°22′49″N 4°21′47″W

Geography
- Location: Stirling, Scotland
- Parent range: Grampian Mountains
- OS grid: NN542234
- Topo map: OS Landranger 51

Meall an t-Seallaidh (852 m) is a mountain in the Southern Highlands of Scotland. It is located in the Loch Lomond and The Trossachs National Park, west of Loch Earn.

The mountain rises steeply from the village of Balquhidder.
