= Càrn Dearg Mòr =

Mountain in Scotland

Coordinates: 56.997°N 3.940°W

Carn Dearg Mor
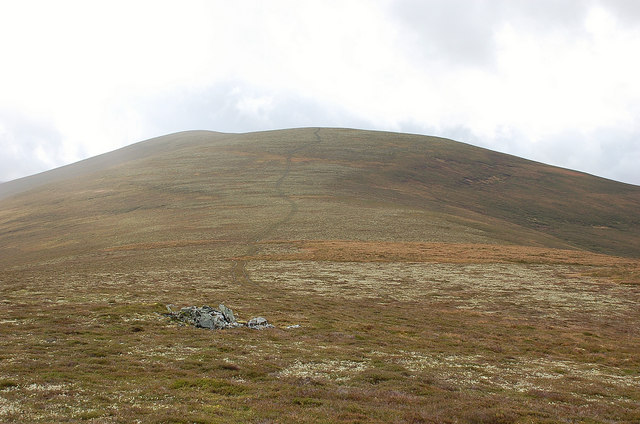
- Looking up to Carn Dearg Mor

Highest point
- Elevation: 857 m (2,812 ft)
- Prominence: 292 m (958 ft)
- Listing: Corbett, Marilyn

Geography
- Location: Inverness-shire, Scotland
- Parent range: Grampian Mountains
- OS grid: NN823912
- Topo map: OS Landranger 35, 43

Carn Dearg Mor (857 m) is a mountain in the Grampian Mountains of Scotland. It lies in the Badenoch and Strathspey area of Inverness-shire, east of the town of Kingussie.

The peak is usually climbed from Glen Feshie to the east, and despite being an undistinguished summit, it provides fantastic views of the surrounding area.
