= Càrn an Fhreiceadain =

Coordinates: 57°08′24″N 4°06′03″W

Càrn an Fhreiceadain is a mountain in the Cairngorms in Scotland. It is situated 7 km north-west of Kingussie, on the edge of the Cairngorms National Park.
