= Sgùrr Innse =

Mountain in Scotland

Sgurr Innse
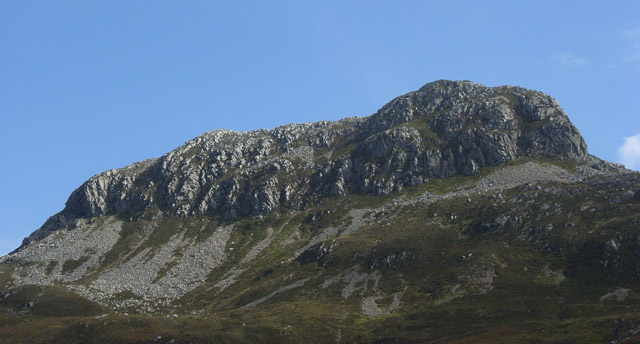
- Sgurr Innse

Highest point
- Elevation: 809 m (2,654 ft)
- Prominence: 216 m (709 ft)
- Listing: Corbett, Marilyn
- Coordinates: 56°49′59″N 4°48′16″W

Geography
- Location: Lochaber, Scotland
- Parent range: Grampian Mountains
- OS grid: NN290748
- Topo map: OS Landranger 41

Sgurr Innse (809 m) is a mountain in the Grampian Mountains of Scotland, situated south of the village of Roybridge in Lochaber.

A rocky lump of a mountain, it offers fantastic views from its summit.
