= List of geographical mealls =

Meall is a Scottish Gaelic word meaning "hill". It is used in the name of geographical features or locations that are Scottish hills or mountains, including:

- Meall nan Aighean, Scottish mountain in the council area of Perth and Kinross
- Meall a' Bhuachaille, mountain in the Cairngorms in Scotland
- Meall a' Bhùiridh, mountain on the edge of Rannoch Moor in the Highlands of Scotland
- Meall Buidhe, Knoydart, Munro in the Knoydart area
- Meall Buidhe, Glen Lyon, Munro on the north side of Glen Lyon
- Meall Buidhe (Corbett), Corbett at the head of Glen Lyon
- Meall Cheo, 201st–highest peak in Ireland on the Arderin scale
- Meall a' Chrasgaidh, Scottish mountain in the Fannich group of mountains, south-southeast of Ullapool
- Meall Chuaich, mountain in the Grampian Mountains of Scotland, east of the village of Dalwhinnie
- Meall Clachach hill in the Glen Artney Hills range immediately south of the Highland Boundary Fault
- Meall Mor (Glen Coe), mountain in the Grampian Mountains of Scotland
- Meall nan Con, Scottish mountain in central Sutherland
- Meall Corranaich, mountain in the Grampian Mountains of Scotland
- Meall Dearg (Aonach Eagach), Munro forming the western end of the Aonach Eagach
- Meall an Dobharchain (The Sow of Atholl), Scottish hill west-northwest of the town of Blair Atholl in Perth and Kinross
- Meall Dubh, mountain in the Northwest Highlands, Scotland
- Meall Dearg (Aonach Eagach), large mountain ridge in the Scottish Highlands, marking the northern edge of Glen Coe
- Meall nan Eun (Munro), mountain in the Grampian Mountains of Scotland
- Meall an Fhudair, mountain in the Grampian Mountains, Scotland
- Meall Fuar-mhonaidh, hill on the west side of Loch Ness, in the Highlands of Scotland
- Meall Garbh (Càrn Mairg Group), Munro on the north side of Glen Lyon
- Meall Garbh (Lawers Group), Munro on the south side of Glen Lyon
- Meall Ghaordaidh, mountain in the Southern Highlands of Scotland, north-west of Killin
- Meall a' Ghiubhais, mountain in the Northwest Highlands, Scotland
- Meall Glas, mountain situated in the southern highlands of Scotland
- Meall Greigh, mountain in the southern part of the Scottish Highlands
- Meall Garbh (Càrn Mairg Group), mountain on the north side of Glen Lyon in the Scottish Highlands
- Meall Garbh (Lawers Group), mountain in the southern part of the Scottish Highlands
- Meall Mor (Loch Katrine), mountain in the Grampian Mountains of Scotland
- Meall an t-Seallaidh, mountain in the Southern Highlands of Scotland
- Meall na h-Eilde, Scottish hill situated in the high ground between the Great Glen and Glen Garry
- Meall Mheinnidh, mountain in the Northwest Highlands of Scotland
- Meall Odhar, mountain in the Scottish Highlands, to the west of Tyndrum
- Meall a' Phubuill, peak in the Northwest Highlands, Scotland, northwest of Fort William in Lochaber
- Meall Tàirneachan, mountain in the Grampian Mountains of Scotland, northwest of Aberfeldy in Perthshire
- Meall nan Tarmachan, mountain in the Southern Highlands of Scotland near Killin just west of Ben Lawers
- Meall na Teanga, Scottish mountain in the Highland council area, north of Spean Bridge

== See also ==
- Mountains and hills of Scotland
