= Beinn na Caillich =

Beinn na Caillich is the name of several mountains in Scotland:

- Beinn na Caillich (Red Hills), a hill of 732 m with 696 m prominence, to the west of Broadford on Skye
- Beinn na Caillich (Kyle Rhea), a hill of 732 m, with 154 m prominence, at the eastern end of Skye, near Kyleakin
- Beinn na Caillich (Knoydart), 785 m, to the south of Loch Hourn
