= Beinn nan Caorach =

Coordinates: 57.150°N 5.521°W

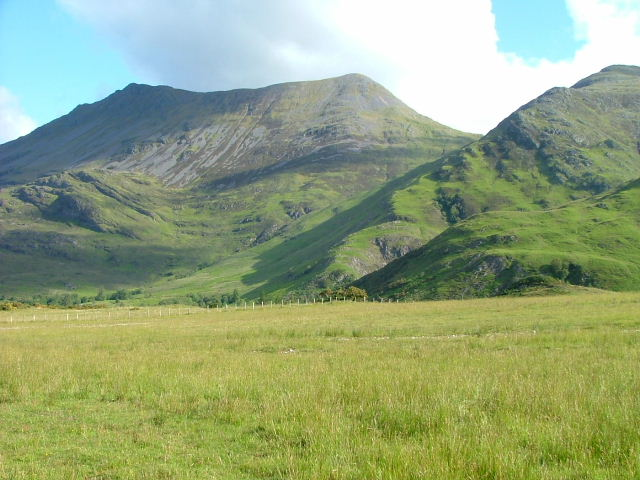
- Beinn nan Caorach

Highest point
- Elevation: 774 m (2,539 ft)
- Prominence: 227 m (745 ft)
- Listing: Corbett, Marilyn

Geography
- Location: Lochalsh, Scotland
- Parent range: Northwest Highlands
- OS grid: NG872121
- Topo map: OS Landranger 33

Beinn nan Caorach (774 m) is a mountain in the Northwest Highlands of Scotland, It is located near the village of Corran in Lochalsh.

One of the smaller mountains in the immediate area, it is often climbed in conjunction with its higher neighbour Beinn na h-Eaglaise. It provides a fine viewpoint from its summit.
