= Shiskine =

Village on the Isle of Arran, Scotland

Coordinates: 55.518°N 5.308°W

Shiskine: Scottish Gaelic: An t-Seasgann
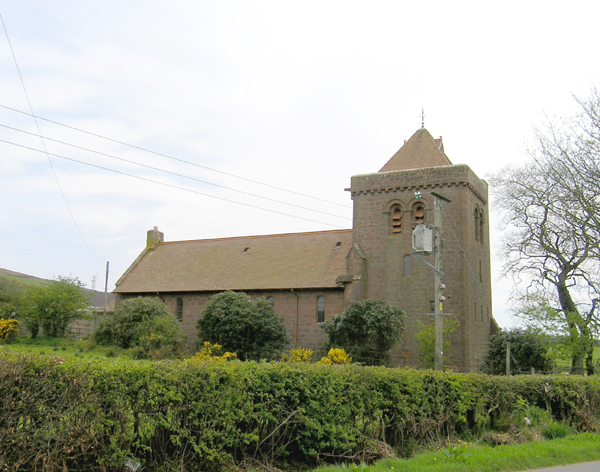
- The church, dedicated to St Molios who was a hermit on Holy Isle

- Location within North Ayrshire
- OS grid reference: NR911298
- Civil parish: Kilmory
- Council area: North Ayrshire
- Lieutenancy area: Ayrshire and Arran
- Country: Scotland
- Sovereign state: United Kingdom
- Post town: ISLE OF ARRAN
- Postcode district: KA27
- Dialling code: 01770
- Police: Scotland
- Fire: Scottish
- Ambulance: Scottish
- UK Parliament: North Ayrshire and Arran
- Scottish Parliament: Cunninghame North

Shiskine (Scottish Gaelic: An t-Seasgann) is a small village on the Isle of Arran in the Firth of Clyde, Scotland. The village is within the parish of Kilmory. Sitting further up Shiskine Glen from the village of Blackwaterfoot, the village takes its name from a corruption of the Gaelic for "marshy place". Much of the area was essentially a swamp years ago, but now comprises farm land.

The village has its own primary school and local church. There is a possible hillfort at Cnoc Ballygowan close by to the village, though its antiquity is disputed. Shiskine is close to the peaks of Beinn Nuis and Beinn Bharrain.
