= Beinn Bhuidhe =

A number of Scottish mountains and hills share the name Beinn Bhuidhe, including:

- Beinn Bhuidhe (Glen Fyne) (948 metres or 3,110 feet), a Munro in the southwestern Highlands
- Beinn Bhuidhe (Mull) (413 metres or 1,355 feet), a Marilyn on the Isle of Mull
- Beinn Bhuidhe (Knoydart) (855 metres or 2,805 feet), a Corbett in Knoydart
- Ben Buie (717 metres or 2,352 feet), a mountain in the south of the Isle of Mull
