= List of Graham mountains =

Scottish peaks of 600 to 762 metres ft

Graham
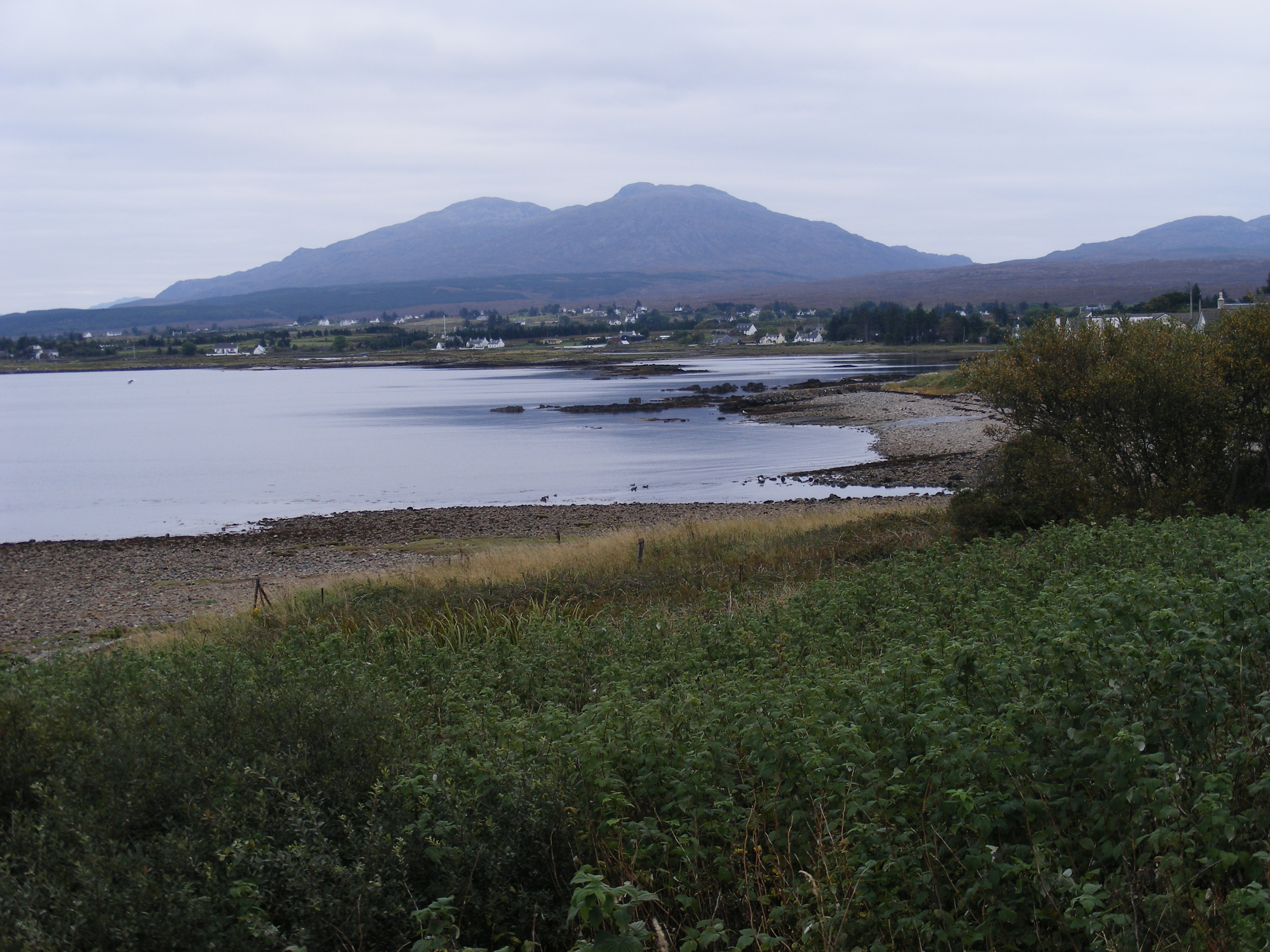
- Sgurr na Coinnich in Skye, the 33rd highest Graham, and the Graham with the greatest prominence.

Highest point
- Elevation: between 600 and 762 metres
- Prominence: at least 150 metres (492 feet)
- Listing: 231

Geography
- Location: Scotland

This is an overview of the Grahams and a list of them by height. Grahams are defined as Scottish hills between 600 and 762 metres in height, with a minimum prominence, or drop, of 150 metres. The final list of Grahams, with this definition, was published by Alan Dawson in 2022 in the booklet Ten Tables of Grahams: The Official List and in the book Tales from the Grahams: 231 medium-sized hills of Scotland.

Scottish hills between 2,000 and 2,500 feet (609.6 and 762.0 metres) were referred to as "Elsies" (short for Lesser Corbetts, being "LCs") in April 1992 by British researcher Alan Dawson in his book The Relative Hills of Britain. In November 1992, Fiona Torbet (née Graham) published her own list which did not include the Southern Uplands and had several omissions and inaccuracies. Dawson and Torbet met to discuss the issue and agreed to use Dawson's list but to apply the name Grahams, which they both preferred to Elsies. By definition, all Grahams, given their prominence, are also Marilyns. Alan Dawson devised and compiled the original list of Marilyns, including the hills now known as Grahams, and has maintained the official lists ever since. The Scottish Mountaineering Club ("SMC") also uses the list, with permission, including it in the 1997 edition of Munro's Tables and in the subsequent guidebook The Grahams & the Donalds.

When first published in 1992, there were 222 Elsies in Scotland, but this soon increased to 224 with the addition of Beinn Talaidh on Mull (after research by Fiona Torbet) and Ladylea Hill. The revised list of hills known as Grahams was formally published in 1995 and 1999 as part of the TACit Tables series. The list of Grahams remained stable for almost twenty years until Alan Dawson began a programme of accurate hill surveying using GNSS equipment. As a result, in 2014, three Grahams were removed as they were only 609 m high (Ben Aslak, Corwharn and Ladylea Hill) and Creag na h-Eararuidh near Glen Artney became a new Graham, replacing Beinn Dearg, which was found to be 1.7 m lower. In 2015 a survey showed that Stob na Boine Druim-fhinn has a drop of only 149.5 m so was no longer a Marilyn or a Graham, then in 2016 Cnoc Coinnich was found to be 763.5 m and therefore too high to be a Graham.

From 2016 to 2022 there were 219 Grahams, until the revised lower threshold of 600 metres resulted in Ben Aslak, Corwharn and Ladylea Hill being reinstated as Grahams, and nine new Grahams added. All but two of the 231 Grahams have been surveyed using GNSS equipment and therefore summit heights are given to the nearest 0.1 m in the official list.

The highest Graham, Beinn Talaidh on the Isle of Mull, is 761.6 metres (2,499 ft) and ranks as the 1285th highest mountain in the British Isles, on the Simms classification. The Graham with the greatest prominence is Sgurr na Coinnich at 714 metres (2,343 ft), which ranks it as the 54th most prominent mountain in the British Isles.

Climbers who climb all of the Grahams are referred to as Grahamists. There is some uncertainty over the first, but it is thought to have been Colin Dodgson in July 1984, followed by Andrew Dempster in June 1997. People who climbed the 219 Grahams over 2000 feet are still classed as Grahamists, following the convention that anyone who completes a list of hills is permanently regarded as having completed it.

== Grahams by height ==
This list was originally copied from the Database of British and Irish Hills ("DoBIH") in October 2018, and are peaks the DoBIH currently marks as being Grahams ("G"). (Note: The Database of British and Irish Hills ("DoBIH") is the most referenced database for the classification of peaks in the British Isles, and the DoBIH is licensed under a "Creative Commons Attribution 3.0 Unported License") The DoBIH team updates their database as more survey results are published.

Added as a Graham in 2014, replacing Beinn Dearg
Previously classed as a Corbett ("xC" § DoBIH codes).

Grahams, ranked by height (DoBIH, October 2018)
Height Rank	Name	Section / Region	County	Height (m)	Prom. (m)	Height (ft)	Prom. (ft)	Topo Map	OS Grid Reference	Classification (§ DoBIH codes)
1	Beinn Talaidh	17E: Mull and Nearby Islands	Argyll and Bute	762	430	2,499	1,411	49	NM625347	Ma,G,Sim,xC
2	Sgurr a' Chaorainn	18B: Sunart and Ardgour	Highland	761	205	2,495	673	40	NM894662	Ma,G,Sim
3	Shee of Ardtalnaig	01A: Loch Tay to Perth	Perth and Kinross	759	224	2,490	735	51 52	NN729351	Ma,G,Sim
4	Beinn a' Chapuill	10A: Glen Shiel to Loch Hourn and Loch Quoich	Highland	759	258	2,490	846	33	NG835148	Ma,G,Sim
5	Carn an Tionail	16B: Durness to Loch Shin	Highland	759	209	2,489	686	16	NC392390	Ma,G,Sim
6	Beinn Shiantaidh	20A: Jura, Scarba and Colonsay	Argyll and Bute	757	303	2,484	994	61	NR513747	Ma,G,Sim
7	Creag Dhubh	09B: Glen Albyn and the Monadh Liath	Highland	756	391	2,480	1,283	35	NN677972	Ma,G,Sim
8	Cook's Cairn	21A: Tomintoul to Banff	Moray	755	210	2,477	689	37	NJ302278	Ma,G,Sim,xC
9	The Stob	01C: Loch Lomond to Strathyre	Stirling	754	229	2,472	751	51	NN491231	Ma,G,Sim
10	Meallan a' Chuail	16E: Scourie to Lairg	Highland	750	204	2,461	669	15	NC344292	Ma,G,Sim
11	Sgurr Choinnich	10C: Loch Arkaig to Glen Moriston	Highland	749	277	2,457	909	34	NN127949	Ma,G,Sim
12	Groban	14B: The Fannaichs	Highland	749	306	2,457	1,004	19	NH099708	Ma,G,Sim
13	Mona Gowan	21A: Tomintoul to Banff	Aberdeenshire	749	194	2,457	636	37	NJ335058	Ma,G,Sim
14	Culter Fell	28B: The River Tweed to the English Border	Scottish Borders/ South Lanarkshire	748	350	2,454	1,148	72	NT052290	Ma,G,Sim,D, CoH,CoU
15	Binnein Shuas	04B: Loch Treig to Loch Ericht	Highland	747	391	2,451	1,284	34 42	NN462826	Ma,G,Sim
16	Meall Mor	01C: Loch Lomond to Strathyre	Stirling	747	262	2,451	860	50 56	NN383151	Ma,G,Sim
17	Meall a' Mhuic	02A: Loch Rannoch to Glen Lyon	Perth and Kinross	745	235	2,444	771	42 51	NN579508	Ma,G,Sim
18	Meall nan Gabhar	01D: Inveraray to Crianlarich	Argyll and Bute	744	265	2,441	869	50	NN235240	Ma,G,Sim
19	Mount Blair	07A: Braemar to Montrose	Angus/ Perth and Kinross	744	400	2,441	1,312	43	NO167629	Ma,G,Sim
20	Druim Fada	10D: Mallaig to Fort William	Highland	744	516	2,441	1,693	41	NN086824	Ma,G,Sim
21	Dun Rig	28B: The River Tweed to the English Border	Scottish Borders	744	243	2,441	797	73	NT253315	Ma,G,Sim,D
22	Geallaig Hill	08B: Cairngorms	Aberdeenshire	743	312	2,438	1,024	37 44	NO297981	Ma,G,Sim
23	Creag Liath	09B: Glen Albyn and the Monadh Liath	Highland	743	188	2,438	617	35	NH663007	Ma,G,Sim
24	Beinn nan Eun	15B: Loch Vaich to Moray Firth	Highland	743	255	2,438	837	20	NH448759	Ma,G,Sim
25	Ben Mor Coigach	16F: Lochinver to Ullapool	Highland	743	655	2,438	2,149	15	NC093042	Ma,G,Sim
26	Pap of Glencoe	03A: Loch Leven to Rannoch Station	Highland	742	156	2,434	512	41	NN125594	Ma,G,Sim
27	Cnap Cruinn	04A: Fort William to Loch Treig & Loch Leven	Highland	742	245	2,434	804	41	NN302774	Ma,G,Sim
28	Sgurr Dearg	17E: Mull and Nearby Islands	Argyll and Bute	741	246	2,431	807	49	NM665339	Ma,G,Sim
29	Beinn Mhor	19C: Loch Fyne to Bute and the Firth of Clyde	Argyll and Bute	741	696	2,431	2,283	56	NS107908	Ma,G,Sim
30	Badandun Hill	07A: Braemar to Montrose	Angus	740	154	2,428	505	44	NO207678	Ma,G,Sim
31	Stob na Cruaiche	03A: Loch Leven to Rannoch Station	Highland/ Perth and Kinross	739	350	2,425	1,148	41	NN363571	Ma,G,Sim
32	Sgurr na Coinnich	17C: South-East Skye and Scalpay	Highland	739	714	2,425	2,343	33	NG762222	Ma,G,Sim
33	Beinn Mheadhoin	18C: Morvern and Kingairloch	Highland	739	568	2,425	1,864	49	NM799514	Ma,G,Sim
34	Meall Mor	15B: Loch Vaich to Moray Firth	Highland	738	263	2,421	863	20	NH515745	Ma,G,Sim
35	Beinn na h-Eaglaise	13B: Applecross to Achnasheen	Highland	736	305	2,415	1,001	25	NG908523	Ma,G,Sim
36	Marsco	17B: Minginish and the Cuillin Hills	Highland	736	413	2,415	1,355	32	NG507251	Ma,G,Sim
37	Beinn Bheag	18B: Sunart and Ardgour	Highland	736	200	2,415	656	40	NM914635	Ma,G,Sim
38	Druim na Sgriodain	18B: Sunart and Ardgour	Highland	735	482	2,410	1,581	40	NM978656	Ma,G,Sim
39	Doune Hill	01E: Loch Long to Loch Lomond	Argyll and Bute	734	695	2,408	2,280	56	NS290970	Ma,G,Sim
40	Beinn a' Chaolais	20A: Jura, Scarba and Colonsay	Argyll and Bute	733	359	2,405	1,178	60 61	NR488734	Ma,G,Sim
41	Glas Bheinn	10C: Loch Arkaig to Glen Moriston	Highland	732	292	2,402	958	34	NN171918	Ma,G,Sim
42	Sgurr a' Gharaidh	13B: Applecross to Achnasheen	Highland	732	333	2,402	1,093	24	NG884443	Ma,G,Sim
43	Sabhal Beag	16B: Durness to Loch Shin	Highland	732	169	2,402	554	9	NC373429	Ma,G,Sim
44	Beinn na Caillich	17C: South-East Skye and Scalpay	Highland	732	694	2,402	2,283	32	NG601232	Ma,G,Sim
45	Beinn na Caillich	17C: South-East Skye and Scalpay	Highland	731	153	2,402	505	33	NG770229	Ma,G,Sim
46	Stob an Eas	19C: Loch Fyne to Bute and the Firth of Clyde	Argyll and Bute	732	248	2,402	814	56	NN185074	Ma,G,Sim
47	Green Lowther	27C: The Glenkens to Annandale	South Lanarkshire	732	424	2,402	1,391	71 78	NS900120	Ma,G,Sim,D
48	Suilven	16F: Lochinver to Ullapool	Highland	731	496	2,398	1,627	15	NC153183	Ma,G,Sim
49	Beinn Dearg Mhor	17B: Minginish and the Cuillin Hills	Highland	731	316	2,398	1,037	32	NG520284	Ma,G,Sim
50	Beinn na Gainimh	01A: Loch Tay to Perth	Perth and Kinross	729	287	2,393	942	52	NN837344	Ma,G,Sim
51	Ben Venue	01C: Loch Lomond to Strathyre	Stirling	729	545	2,392	1,788	57	NN474063	Ma,G,Sim
52	Meall Doire Faid	15A: Loch Broom to Strath Oykel	Highland	729	175	2,392	574	20	NH220792	Ma,G,Sim
53	Uisgneabhal Mor	24B: Harris and Nearby Islands	Western Isles	729	482	2,392	1,581	13 14	NB120085	Ma,G,Sim
54	Carnan Cruithneachd	11A: Loch Duich to Cannich	Highland	728	220	2,388	722	25 33	NG994258	Ma,G,Sim
55	Mullach Coire nan Geur-oirean	10D: Mallaig to Fort William	Highland	727	191	2,385	627	41	NN049892	Ma,G,Sim
56	Mam Hael	03B: Loch Linnhe to Loch Etive	Argyll and Bute	726	161	2,382	528	50	NN008408	Ma,G,Sim
57	Beinn a' Chearcaill	13A: Loch Torridon to Loch Maree	Highland	725	368	2,379	1,207	19	NG930637	Ma,G,Sim
58	Meall nan Damh	18B: Sunart and Ardgour	Highland	723	347	2,372	1,138	40	NM919744	Ma,G,Sim
59	Meall Mheinnidh	14A: Loch Maree to Loch Broom	Highland	722	227	2,369	745	19	NG954748	Ma,G,Sim
60	Creagan a' Chaise	21A: Tomintoul to Banff	Moray	722	330	2,369	1,083	36	NJ104241	Ma,G,Sim
61	Beinn Bharrain	20C: Arran and Holy Island	North Ayrshire	721	385	2,367	1,263	62 69	NR901427	Ma,G,Sim
62	Stob Mhic Bheathain	18B: Sunart and Ardgour	Highland	721	215	2,365	705	40	NM914713	Ma,G,Sim
63	The Buck	21A: Tomintoul to Banff	Aberdeenshire/ Moray	721	255	2,365	837	37	NJ412233	Ma,G,Sim
64	Ben Cleuch	26A: Central Scotland from Dumbarton to Montrose	Clackmannanshire	721	595	2,365	1,952	58	NN902006	Ma,G,Sim,D, CoH,CoU
65	Ben Stack	16E: Scourie to Lairg	Highland	720	531	2,362	1,742	9	NC269422	Ma,G,Sim
66	Meall Buidhe	01A: Loch Tay to Perth	Stirling	719	273	2,359	896	51	NN576275	Ma,G,Sim
67	The Storr	17A: North Skye and Raasay	Highland	719	671	2,359	2,201	23	NG495540	Ma,G,Sim
68	An Stac	10D: Mallaig to Fort William	Highland	718	223	2,356	732	40	NM866889	Ma,G,Sim
69	Ben Buie	17E: Mull and Nearby Islands	Argyll and Bute	717	514	2,352	1,686	49	NM604270	Ma,G,Sim
70	Lamachan Hill	27B: Carrick and Galloway	Dumfries and Galloway	717	453	2,352	1,486	77	NX435769	Ma,G,Sim,D
71	Beinn Mheadhonach	03B: Loch Linnhe to Loch Etive	Argyll and Bute	715	252	2,346	827	50	NN019368	Ma,G,Sim
72	Cnap Chaochan Aitinn	08B: Cairngorms	Moray	715	159	2,346	522	36	NJ145099	Ma,G,Sim
73	Beinn Chaorach	01E: Loch Long to Loch Lomond	Argyll and Bute	713	381	2,339	1,250	56	NS287923	Ma,G,Sim
74	Creag Mhor	16D: Altnaharra to Dornoch	Highland	713	367	2,339	1,204	16	NC698240	Ma,G,Sim
75	Creag Ruadh	01A: Loch Tay to Perth	Perth and Kinross	712	196	2,336	643	51	NN673292	Ma,G,Sim
76	Beinn nan Ramh	14B: The Fannaichs	Highland	711	386	2,333	1,266	19	NH139661	Ma,G,Sim
77	Tinto	27A: Ayr to the River Clyde	South Lanarkshire	711	442	2,333	1,450	72	NS953343	Ma,G,Sim,D
78	Cairnsmore of Fleet	27B: Carrick and Galloway	Dumfries and Galloway	711	522	2,333	1,713	83	NX501670	Ma,G,Sim,D
79	Druim Fada	10A: Glen Shiel to Loch Hourn and Loch Quoich	Highland	711	484	2,332	1,588	33	NG894083	Ma,G,Sim
80	Meith Bheinn	10D: Mallaig to Fort William	Highland	710	325	2,329	1,066	40	NM821872	Ma,G,Sim
81	Beinn Tharsuinn	15B: Loch Vaich to Moray Firth	Highland	710	176	2,329	577	20	NH412829	Ma,G,Sim
82	Carn a' Ghille Chearr	21A: Tomintoul to Banff	Highland/ Moray	710	179	2,329	587	36	NJ139298	Ma,G,Sim,CoH
83	Beinn a' Mhanaich	01E: Loch Long to Loch Lomond	Argyll and Bute	709	358	2,326	1,175	56	NS269946	Ma,G,Sim
84	Beinn nan Lus	03C: Glen Etive to Glen Lochy	Argyll and Bute	709	240	2,326	787	50	NN130375	Ma,G,Sim
85	Beinn Dearg Mhor	17C: South-East Skye and Scalpay	Highland	709	152	2,326	499	32	NG587228	Ma,G,Sim
86	Creag na h-Eararuidh	01B: Strathyre to Strathallan	Perth and Kinross	708	353	2,324	1,158	57	NN685190	Ma,G,Sim
87	Carn a' Chaochain	11B: Glen Affric to Glen Moriston	Highland	706	269	2,316	883	34	NH235177	Ma,G,Sim
88	Morven	16C: Tongue to Wick and Helmsdale	Highland	706	574	2,316	1,883	17	ND004285	Ma,G,Sim,CoH
89	Hunt Hill	07B: Braemar to Montrose	Angus	705	181	2,313	594	44	NO380805	Ma,G,Sim
90	An Cruachan	12B: Killilan to Inverness	Highland	705	237	2,313	778	25	NH093358	Ma,G,Sim
91	Meall a' Chaorainn	14B: The Fannaichs	Highland	705	189	2,313	620	19	NH135604	Ma,G,Sim
92	Ben Armine	16D: Altnaharra to Dornoch	Highland	705	243	2,313	797	16	NC694273	Ma,G,Sim
93	Sgurr an Fhidhleir	16F: Lochinver to Ullapool	Highland	705	160	2,313	525	15	NC094054	Ma,G,Sim
94	Corra-bheinn	17E: Mull and Nearby Islands	Argyll and Bute	705	317	2,313	1,040	48	NM573321	Ma,G,Sim
95	Beinn Eich	01E: Loch Long to Loch Lomond	Argyll and Bute	703	159	2,306	522	56	NS302946	Ma,G,Sim
96	Beinn Lochain	19C: Loch Fyne to Bute and the Firth of Clyde	Argyll and Bute	703	375	2,306	1,232	56	NN160006	Ma,G,Sim
97	Duchray Hill	07A: Braemar to Montrose	Angus/ Perth and Kinross	702	264	2,303	866	43	NO161672	Ma,G,Sim
98	Belig	17B: Minginish and the Cuillin Hills	Highland	702	246	2,303	807	32	NG543240	Ma,G,Sim
99	Trollabhal	17D: Canna, Rhum and Eigg	Highland	702	189	2,303	620	39	NM377952	Ma,G,Sim
100	Beinn Fhada	17E: Mull and Nearby Islands	Argyll and Bute	702	174	2,303	571	47 48	NM540349	Ma,G,Sim
101	Meall Garbh	03C: Glen Etive to Glen Lochy	Argyll and Bute	701	257	2,300	843	50	NN167367	Ma,G,Sim
102	Carn a' Choin Deirg	15A: Loch Broom to Strath Oykel	Highland	701	319	2,300	1,047	20	NH397923	Ma,G,Sim
103	Sgurr nan Cnamh	18B: Sunart and Ardgour	Highland	701	157	2,300	515	40	NM886643	Ma,G,Sim
104	Blackcraig Hill	27C: The Glenkens to Annandale	East Ayrshire	701	236	2,300	774	71 77	NS647064	Ma,G,Sim,D,CoU
105	Slat Bheinn	10B: Knoydart to Glen Kingie	Highland	700	267	2,297	876	33	NG910027	Ma,G,Sim
106	Meall Fuar-mhonaidh	11B: Glen Affric to Glen Moriston	Highland	699	234	2,293	768	26	NH457222	Ma,G,Sim
107	Creach-Beinn	17E: Mull and Nearby Islands	Argyll and Bute	698	551	2,290	1,808	49	NM642276	Ma,G,Sim
108	Windy Standard	27C: The Glenkens to Annandale	Dumfries and Galloway	698	212	2,290	696	77	NS620014	Ma,G,Sim,D
109	Carn Loch nan Amhaichean	15B: Loch Vaich to Moray Firth	Highland	697	202	2,287	663	20	NH411757	Ma,G,Sim
110	Queensberry	27C: The Glenkens to Annandale	Dumfries and Galloway	697	363	2,287	1,191	78	NX989997	Ma,G,Sim,D
111	Beinn na Muice	12A: Kyle of Lochalsh to Garve	Highland	695	159	2,280	522	25	NH218402	Ma,G,Sim
112	Beinn a' Mhuinidh	14A: Loch Maree to Loch Broom	Highland	692	383	2,270	1,257	19	NH032660	Ma,G,Sim
113	Mullwharchar	27B: Carrick and Galloway	East Ayrshire	692	187	2,270	614	77	NX454866	Ma,G,Sim,D
114	Ettrick Pen	28B: The River Tweed to the English Border	Dumfries and Galloway/ Scottish Borders	692	358	2,270	1,175	79	NT199076	Ma,G,Sim,D
115	Beinn Tharsuinn	15B: Loch Vaich to Moray Firth	Highland	692	353	2,270	1,158	21	NH606792	Ma,G,Sim
116	Meall Dearg	01A: Loch Tay to Perth	Perth and Kinross	690	172	2,265	565	52	NN886414	Ma,G,Sim
117	Beinn Molurgainn	03B: Loch Linnhe to Loch Etive	Argyll and Bute	690	151	2,264	495	50	NN019400	Ma,G,Sim
118	Ballencleuch Law	27C: The Glenkens to Annandale	South Lanarkshire	689	204	2,260	669	78	NS935049	Ma,G,Sim,D
119	Beinn Direach	16B: Durness to Loch Shin	Highland	689	152	2,260	499	16	NC406380	Ma,G,Sim
120	Stob Breac	01C: Loch Lomond to Strathyre	Stirling	688	243	2,257	797	57	NN447166	Ma,G,Sim
121	Gathersnow Hill	28B: The River Tweed to the English Border	Scottish Borders/ South Lanarkshire	688	210	2,257	689	72	NT058256	Ma,G,Sim,D
122	Beinn Damhain	01D: Inveraray to Crianlarich	Argyll and Bute	684	220	2,244	722	50 56	NN282172	Ma,G,Sim
123	Cruach an t-Sidhein	01E: Loch Long to Loch Lomond	Argyll and Bute	684	169	2,244	554	56	NS275964	Ma,G,Sim
124	Leana Mhor	09C: Loch Lochy to Loch Laggan	Highland	684	169	2,244	554	34 41	NN284878	Ma,G,Sim
125	Beinn a' Chaisgein Beag	14A: Loch Maree to Loch Broom	Highland	682	173	2,238	568	19	NG966821	Ma,G,Sim
126	Meall Onfhaidh	10D: Mallaig to Fort William	Highland	681	299	2,234	981	41	NN010840	Ma,G,Sim
127	Meall na Faochaig	12A: Kyle of Lochalsh to Garve	Highland	681	273	2,234	896	25	NH257525	Ma,G,Sim
128	Beinn Bhreac	01E: Loch Long to Loch Lomond	Argyll and Bute	681	524	2,233	1,719	56	NN321000	Ma,G,Sim
129	Meall a' Chrathaich	11B: Glen Affric to Glen Moriston	Highland	679	184	2,228	604	26	NH360220	Ma,G,Sim
130	Carn na Breabaig	12B: Killilan to Inverness	Highland	679	177	2,228	581	25	NH066301	Ma,G,Sim
131	Tiorga Mor	24B: Harris and Nearby Islands	Western Isles	679	588	2,228	1,929	13 14	NB055115	Ma,G,Sim
132	Hill of Wirren	07B: Braemar to Montrose	Angus	678	311	2,224	1,020	44	NO522739	Ma,G,Sim
133	Carn Mhic an Toisich	11B: Glen Affric to Glen Moriston	Highland	678	176	2,224	577	34	NH310185	Ma,G,Sim
134	Carn Breac	13B: Applecross to Achnasheen	Highland	678	392	2,224	1,286	25	NH045530	Ma,G,Sim
135	Capel Fell	28B: The River Tweed to the English Border	Dumfries and Galloway/ Scottish Borders	678	159	2,224	522	79	NT163069	Ma,G,Sim,D
136	Andrewhinney Hill	28B: The River Tweed to the English Border	Dumfries and Galloway/ Scottish Borders	677	194	2,222	636	79	NT197138	Ma,G,Sim,D
137	Carn Gorm	12B: Killilan to Inverness	Highland	677	194	2,222	636	26	NH328355	Ma,G,Sim
138	Meall Mor	03B: Loch Linnhe to Loch Etive	Highland	676	304	2,218	997	41	NN106559	Ma,G,Sim
139	Beinn Suidhe	03C: Glen Etive to Glen Lochy	Argyll and Bute	676	280	2,218	919	50	NN211400	Ma,G,Sim
140	Leana Mhor	09C: Loch Lochy to Loch Laggan	Highland	676	158	2,218	518	34 41	NN316879	Ma,G,Sim
141	Creag Each	01A: Loch Tay to Perth	Perth and Kinross	674	218	2,210	715	51	NN652263	Ma,G,Sim
142	Carn na Coinnich	12A: Kyle of Lochalsh to Garve	Highland	673	265	2,209	869	26	NH324510	Ma,G,Sim
143	Cat Law	07A: Braemar to Montrose	Angus	671	296	2,201	971	44	NO318610	Ma,G,Sim
144	An Ruadh-mheallan	13A: Loch Torridon to Loch Maree	Highland	671	200	2,201	656	19 24	NG836614	Ma,G,Sim
145	Hartaval	17A: North Skye and Raasay	Highland	669	180	2,195	591	23	NG480551	Ma,G,Sim
146	Creag Bhalg	08B: Cairngorms	Aberdeenshire	668	159	2,192	522	43	NO091912	Ma,G,Sim
147	Beinn Bheag	14B: The Fannaichs	Highland	668	196	2,192	643	19	NH085714	Ma,G,Sim
148	Binnein Shios	04B: Loch Treig to Loch Ericht	Highland	667	282	2,189	925	34 42	NN492857	Ma,G,Sim
149	Meall nan Eun	10B: Knoydart to Glen Kingie	Highland	667	172	2,188	564	33	NG903052	Ma,G,Sim
150	Beinn Bhreac	15A: Loch Broom to Strath Oykel	Highland	667	158	2,188	518	20	NH225886	Ma,G,Sim
151	Beinn Gaire	18A: Moidart and Ardnamurchan	Highland	666	321	2,185	1,053	40	NM781748	Ma,G,Sim
152	Uamh Bheag	26B: Central Scotland from Dumbarton to Montrose	Perth and Kinross/ Stirling	666	325	2,184	1,066	57	NN691118	Ma,G,Sim,D
153	Meall Tairbh	03C: Glen Etive to Glen Lochy	Argyll and Bute	665	257	2,182	843	50	NN250375	Ma,G,Sim
154	Beinn Mheadhoin	12A: Kyle of Lochalsh to Garve	Highland	665	218	2,182	715	25	NH258477	Ma,G,Sim
155	Beinn Ruadh	19C: Loch Fyne to Bute and the Firth of Clyde	Argyll and Bute	664	501	2,178	1,644	56	NS155884	Ma,G,Sim
156	Sgorr a' Choise	03B: Loch Linnhe to Loch Etive	Highland	663	288	2,175	945	41	NN084551	Ma,G,Sim
157	Aodann Chleireig	10D: Mallaig to Fort William	Highland	663	316	2,175	1,037	40	NM994825	Ma,G,Sim
158	Croit Bheinn	18A: Moidart and Ardnamurchan	Highland	663	227	2,175	745	40	NM810773	Ma,G,Sim
159	Oireabhal	24B: Harris and Nearby Islands	Western Isles	662	419	2,172	1,375	13 14	NB083099	Ma,G,Sim
160	Windlestraw Law	28A: Firth of Forth to the River Tweed	Scottish Borders	659	461	2,163	1,512	73	NT371430	Ma,G,Sim,D
161	Carn Glas-choire	09A: Inverness to Strathspey	Highland	659	251	2,162	823	35 36	NH891291	Ma,G,Sim,CoH
162	Creag Mhor	01C: Loch Lomond to Strathyre	Stirling	658	293	2,159	961	57	NN510185	Ma,G,Sim
163	Meall nan Eagan	04B: Loch Treig to Loch Ericht	Highland	658	166	2,159	545	42	NN596874	Ma,G,Sim
164	Creag Ruadh	05B: Loch Ericht to Glen Tromie & Glen Garry	Highland	658	197	2,159	646	42	NN685882	Ma,G,Sim
165	Creag Dhubh	09C: Loch Lochy to Loch Laggan	Highland	658	332	2,159	1,089	34 41	NN322824	Ma,G,Sim
166	Mid Hill (Beinn Dubh)	01E: Loch Long to Loch Lomond	Argyll and Bute	657	430	2,156	1,411	56	NS321962	Ma,G,Sim
167	Millfore	27B: Carrick and Galloway	Dumfries and Galloway	657	250	2,156	820	77	NX478754	Ma,G,Sim,D
168	Meall Odhar	01D: Inveraray to Crianlarich	Stirling	656	183	2,152	600	50	NN297298	Ma,G,Sim
169	Meall Blair	10C: Loch Arkaig to Glen Moriston	Highland	656	213	2,152	699	33	NN077950	Ma,G,Sim
170	Fiarach	01D: Inveraray to Crianlarich	Stirling	652	181	2,140	594	50	NN344261	Ma,G,Sim
171	Beinn na Cille	18C: Morvern and Kingairloch	Highland	652	193	2,139	633	49	NM853542	Ma,G,Sim
172	Beinn Donachain	03C: Glen Etive to Glen Lochy	Argyll and Bute	651	376	2,137	1,234	50	NN198316	Ma,G,Sim
173	Glas-bheinn Mhor	11B: Glen Affric to Glen Moriston	Highland	651	156	2,136	512	26	NH436231	Ma,G,Sim
174	Blackhope Scar	28A: Firth of Forth to the River Tweed	Midlothian/ Scottish Borders	651	282	2,136	925	73	NT315483	Ma,G,Sim,D, CoH,CoU,CoA
175	Sgorr Mhic Eacharna	18B: Sunart and Ardgour	Highland	650	168	2,133	551	40	NM928630	Ma,G,Sim
176	Carn Salachaidh	15B: Loch Vaich to Moray Firth	Highland	647	234	2,123	768	20	NH518874	Ma,G,Sim
177	Beinn na Cloiche	04A: Fort William to Loch Treig & Loch Leven	Highland	646	194	2,119	636	41	NN284648	Ma,G,Sim
178	Biod an Fhithich	10A: Glen Shiel to Loch Hourn and Loch Quoich	Highland	646	154	2,119	506	33	NG950147	Ma,G,Sim
179	Craignaw	27B: Carrick and Galloway	Dumfries and Galloway	645	151	2,116	495	77	NX459833	Ma,G,Sim,D
180	Sgiath a' Chaise	01B: Strathyre to Strathallan	Stirling	644	303	2,114	994	57	NN583169	Ma,G,Sim
181	Creag Tharsuinn	19C: Loch Fyne to Bute and the Firth of Clyde	Argyll and Bute	643	395	2,110	1,296	56	NS087913	Ma,G,Sim
182	Beinn Clachach	10A: Glen Shiel to Loch Hourn and Loch Quoich	Highland	642	228	2,107	749	33	NG885109	Ma,G,Sim
183	Blath Bhalg	06B: Pitlochry to Braemar & Blairgowrie	Perth and Kinross	641	265	2,103	869	43	NO019611	Ma,G,Sim
184	Mor Bheinn	01B: Strathyre to Strathallan	Perth and Kinross	640	327	2,101	1,073	51 52 57	NN716211	Ma,G,Sim
185	Creag Gharbh	01A: Loch Tay to Perth	Stirling	637	151	2,091	495	51	NN632327	Ma,G,Sim
186	Croft Head	28B: The River Tweed to the English Border	Dumfries and Galloway	637	194	2,090	636	79	NT153056	Ma,G,Sim,D
187	Beinn Bhalgairean	01D: Inveraray to Crianlarich	Argyll and Bute	637	210	2,089	689	50	NN202241	Ma,G,Sim
188	Beinn na Sroine	03C: Glen Etive to Glen Lochy	Argyll and Bute	636	221	2,087	725	50	NN233289	Ma,G,Sim
189	Glas Bheinn	18B: Sunart and Ardgour	Highland	636	151	2,087	495	40	NM939757	Ma,G,Sim
190	Beinn Ghobhlach	14A: Loch Maree to Loch Broom	Highland	635	401	2,083	1,316	19	NH055943	Ma,G,Sim
191	Glas-charn	10D: Mallaig to Fort William	Highland	633	328	2,077	1,076	40	NM846837	Ma,G,Sim
192	Cruinn a' Bheinn	01C: Loch Lomond to Strathyre	Stirling	632	177	2,073	581	56	NN365051	Ma,G,Sim
193	Tullich Hill	01E: Loch Long to Loch Lomond	Argyll and Bute	632	273	2,073	896	56	NN293006	Ma,G,Sim
194	Meall a' Chaorainn	15A: Loch Broom to Strath Oykel	Highland	632	157	2,073	515	20	NH360827	Ma,G,Sim
195	Beinn Dhorain	16D: Altnaharra to Dornoch	Highland	628	416	2,060	1,365	17	NC925156	Ma,G,Sim
196	Beinn na Feusaige	13B: Applecross to Achnasheen	Highland	627	228	2,056	748	25	NH090542	Ma,G,Sim
197	Beinn a' Chlachain	13B: Applecross to Achnasheen	Highland	626	373	2,054	1,224	24	NG724490	Ma,G,Sim
198	Scaraben	16C: Tongue to Wick and Helmsdale	Highland	626	331	2,054	1,086	17	ND066268	Ma,G,Sim
199	Meall nan Caorach	01A: Loch Tay to Perth	Perth and Kinross	624	322	2,046	1,056	52	NN928338	Ma,G,Sim
200	Creag Ruadh	09C: Loch Lochy to Loch Laggan	Highland	622	309	2,041	1,014	35	NN558913	Ma,G,Sim
201	Creag Ghuanach	04A: Fort William to Loch Treig & Loch Leven	Highland	621	212	2,037	696	41	NN299690	Ma,G,Sim
202	Tom Meadhoin	04A: Fort William to Loch Treig & Loch Leven	Highland	621	155	2,037	509	41	NN087621	Ma,G,Sim
203	Beinn Mhor	24C: North Uist, South Uist and Nearby Islands	Western Isles	620	620	2,034	2,034	22	NF808310	Ma,G,Sim,SIB
204	Beinn an Eoin	16F: Lochinver to Ullapool	Highland	619	355	2,031	1,165	15	NC104064	Ma,G,Sim
205	Pressendye	21B: Fraserburgh to the Dee Valley	Aberdeenshire	619	254	2,031	833	37	NJ490089	Ma,G,Sim
206	Cauldcleuch Head	28B: The River Tweed to the English Border	Scottish Borders	619	256	2,031	840	79	NT456006	Ma,G,Sim,D
207	Cruach Choireadail	17E: Mull and Nearby Islands	Argyll and Bute	618	194	2,028	636	48	NM594304	Ma,G,Sim
208	Beinn Bheag	19C: Loch Fyne to Bute and the Firth of Clyde	Argyll and Bute	618	300	2,028	984	56	NS125931	Ma,G,Sim
209	Meall Reamhar	01A: Loch Tay to Perth	Perth and Kinross	618	154	2,027	505	52	NN922332	Ma,G,Sim
210	Carn na h-Easgainn	09B: Glen Albyn and the Monadh Liath	Highland	617	173	2,024	568	27	NH743320	Ma,G,Sim
211	Beinn na Gucaig	04A: Fort William to Loch Treig & Loch Leven	Highland	616	451	2,021	1,480	41	NN062653	Ma,G,Sim
212	Carn nan Tri-tighearnan	09A: Inverness to Strathspey	Highland	615	333	2,018	1,093	27	NH823390	Ma,G,Sim
213	Beinn a' Mheadhoin	11A: Loch Duich to Cannich	Highland	613	245	2,011	804	25	NH218255	Ma,G,Sim
214	Meall an Fheur Loch	16E: Scourie to Lairg	Highland	613	165	2,011	541	16	NC361310	Ma,G,Sim
215	Creag a' Mhadaidh	05A: Loch Ericht to Glen Tromie & Glen Garry	Perth and Kinross	612	156	2,008	512	42	NN634650	Ma,G,Sim
216	Stac Pollaidh	16F: Lochinver to Ullapool	Highland	612	441	2,008	1,447	15	NC107106	Ma,G,Sim
217	Cruach nan Capull	19C: Loch Fyne to Bute and the Firth of Clyde	Argyll and Bute	612	486	2,008	1,594	63	NS095795	Ma,G,Sim
218	Cruach nam Mult	19C: Loch Fyne to Bute and the Firth of Clyde	Argyll and Bute	611	282	2,005	925	56	NN168056	Ma,G,Sim
219	Creag Dhubh Mhor	12A: Kyle of Lochalsh to Garve	Highland	611	168	2,005	551	25	NG982404	Ma,G,Sim
220	Ben Aslak	17C: South-East Skye and Scalpay	Highland	609	329	1,998	1,079	33	NG 75079 19121	Ma,G,Sim
221	Corwharn	07A: Braemar to Montrose	Angus	609.1	152.5	1,998	500	44	NO 28864 65095	Ma,G,Sim
222	Ladylea Hill	21A: Tomintoul to Banff	Aberdeenshire	609.1	200.7	1,998	658	37	NJ 34303 16793	Ma,G,Sim
223	Burach	10C: Loch Arkaig to Glen Moriston	Highland	607	236	1,991	774	34	NH 38293 14140	Ma,G,Sim
224	Cruach nam Miseag	19C: Loch Fyne to Bute and the Firth of Clyde	Argyll and Bute	607	206	1,991	676	56	NS 18294 98118	Ma,G,Sim
225	Cruach Neuran	19C: Loch Fyne to Bute and the Firth of Clyde	Argyll and Bute	607	296	1,991	971	56	NS 08398 82035	Ma,G,Sim
226	Hecla (South Uist)	24C: North Uist, South Uist and Nearby Islands	Western Isles	606.6	309	1,990	1,014	22	NF 82560 34484	Ma,G,Sim
227	Well Hill (Lowther)	27C: The Glenkens to Annandale	South Lanarkshire	606	200	1,988	656	71 78	NS 91372 06454	Ma,G,Sim,DDew
228	Beinn a' Chuirn	10A: Glen Shiel to Loch Hourn and Loch Quoich	Highland	603	261	1,978	856	33	NG 87008 21992	Ma,G,Sim
229	Sgorach Mor	19C: Loch Fyne to Bute and the Firth of Clyde	Argyll and Bute	602.2	429	1,976	1,407	56	NS 09685 84987	Ma,G,Sim
230	Sithean Mor	10D: Mallaig to Fort William	Highland	601.5	324	1,973	1,063	40	NM 72953 86611	Ma,G,Sim
231	Leagag	02A: Loch Rannoch to Glen Lyon	Perth and Kinross	601	215	1,972	705	42 51	NN 51888 53904	Ma,G,Sim

== Bibliography ==
- Alan Dawson; Ann Bowker (2022). Tales from the Grahams: 231 medium-sized hills of Scotland. Pedantic Press. ISBN 978-1916366244.
- Alan Dawson; E. D. Clements; James Gordon (2004). Graham Tops and Grahamists (TACit tables). TACit Press. ISBN 978-1907233197.
- Andrew Dempster (2003). The Grahams: A Guide to Scotland's 2,000ft Peaks. Mainstream Publishing. ISBN 978-1840187342.
- Rab Anderson; Tom Prentice (2022). The Grahams & The Donalds - Scottish Mountaineering Club Hillwalkers' Guide. Scottish Mountaineering Press. ISBN 978-1907233456.
- Alan Dawson (1992). The Relative Hills of Britain. Cicerone Press. ISBN 978-1852840686.

== DoBIH codes ==
The DoBIH uses the following codes for the various classifications of mountains and hills in the British Isles, which many of the above peaks also fall into:

- Ma Marilyn
- Hu HuMP
- Sim Simm
- 5 Dodd
- M Munro
- MT Munro Top
- F Furth
- C Corbett
- G Graham
- D Donald
- DT Donald Top
- Hew Hewitt
- N Nuttall
- Dew Dewey
- DDew Donald Dewey
- HF Highland Five
- 4 400-499m Tump
- 3 300-399m Tump (GB)
- 2 200-299m Tump (GB)
- 1 100-199m Tump (GB)
- 0 0-99m Tump (GB)
- W Wainwright
- WO Wainwright Outlying Fell
- B Birkett
- Sy Synge
- Fel Fellranger
- CoH County Top – Historic (pre-1974)
- CoA County Top – Administrative (1974 to mid-1990s)
- CoU County Top – Current County or Unitary Authority
- CoL County Top – Current London Borough
- SIB Significant Island of Britain
- Dil Dillon
- A Arderin
- VL Vandeleur-Lynam
- MDew Myrddyn Dewey
- O Other list (which includes):
  - Bin Binnion
  - Bg Bridge
  - BL Buxton & Lewis
  - Ca Carn
  - CT Corbett Top
  - GT Graham Top
  - Mur Murdo
  - P500 P500
  - P600 P600
- Un unclassified

prefixes:
- s sub
- x deleted

== See also ==
- Lists of mountains and hills in the British Isles
- List of mountains of the British Isles by height
- Lists of mountains and hills in the British Isles
- Lists of mountains in Ireland
- List of Munro mountains
- List of Murdo mountains
- List of Furth mountains in the British Isles
- List of Marilyns in the British Isles
- List of P600 mountains in the British Isles
