= Beinn an Eoin =

Beinn an Eoin may refer to the following mountains:

- Beinn an Eoin (Coigach)
- Beinn an Eoin (Torridon)
