= Trollabhal =

Mountain in Scotland

- Trallval
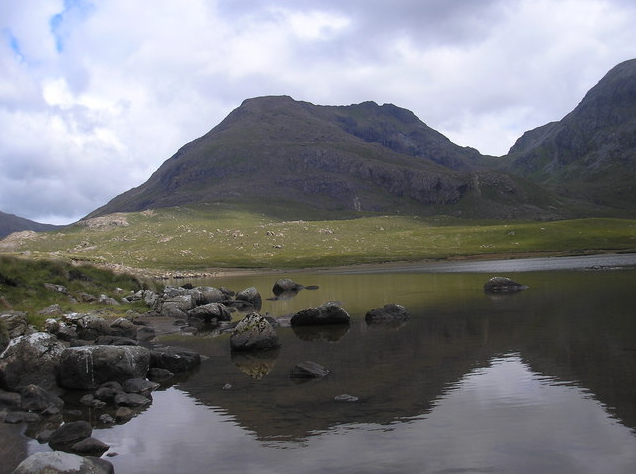
- Trollabhal

Highest point
- Elevation: 702 m (2,303 ft)
- Prominence: 189 m (620 ft)
- Listing: Graham, Marilyn
- Coordinates: 56°58′24″N 6°18′59″W

Geography
- Location: Rùm, Lochaber Scotland
- Parent range: Rum Cuillin
- OS grid: NM377951
- Topo map: OS Landranger 39

Trollabhal (also known as Trallval) (702 m) is a mountain in the island of Rùm in Lochaber, Scotland.

Although the lowest of the 'Rum Cuillin' in the south of the Island, Trollabhal is one of the finest peaks in the range. Climbers have to navigate a narrow arête of bare rock in order to reach the summit. Scrambling is also required on both ridges.
