= Beinn nan Eun =

Scottish mountain

Coordinates: 57.747°N 4.611°W

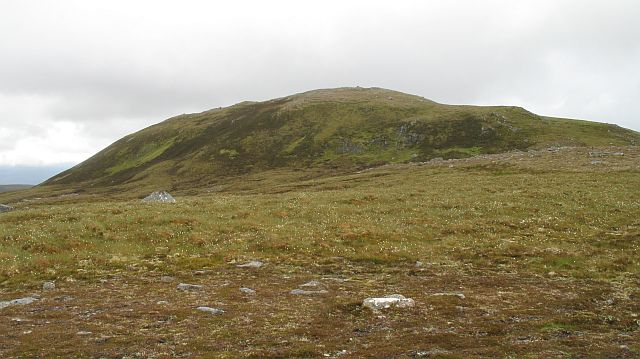
- Beinn nan Eun

Highest point
- Elevation: 743 m (2,438 ft)
- Prominence: 255 m (837 ft)
- Listing: Graham, Marilyn

Geography
- Location: Easter Ross, Scotland
- Parent range: Northwest Highlands
- OS grid: NH448760
- Topo map: OS Landranger 20

Beinn nan Eun (743 m) is a mountain in the Northwest Highlands of Scotland. It is located in Easter Ross, several miles northwest of Dingwall.

A very remote peak, it is located on the wild moorland above Loch Glass. Ben Wyvis lies to its south.
