= Mount Blair (Scotland) =

Hill

Coordinates: 56.751°N 3.363°W

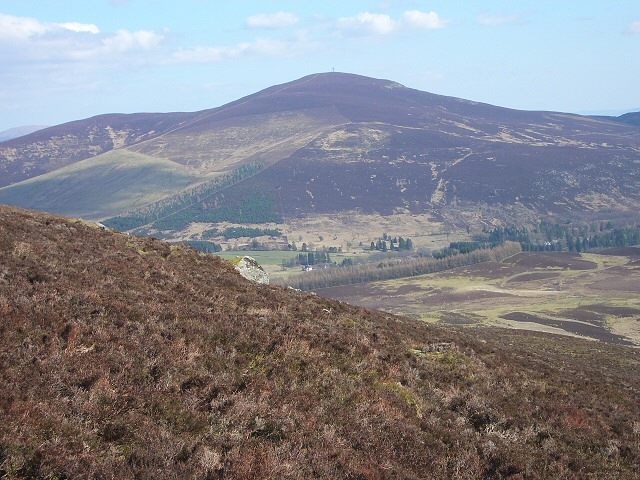
- Mount Blair

Highest point
- Elevation: 744 m (2,441 ft)
- Prominence: 400 m (1,300 ft)
- Listing: Graham, Marilyn

Geography
- Location: Angus and Perth and Kinross, Scotland
- Parent range: Grampian Mountains
- OS grid: NO167629
- Topo map: OS Landranger 51

Mount Blair is a large hill on the Perth and Kinross and Angus border, Scotland, in the southern foothills of the Grampian Mountains.

It lies between the valleys of Glen Shee and Glen Isla, north of the town of Blairgowrie. The peak provides a fairly straightforward hillwalking route, with extensive views at the top. Its summit is topped by a transmitter mast.
