= Meall a' Phubuill =

Mountain in Scotland

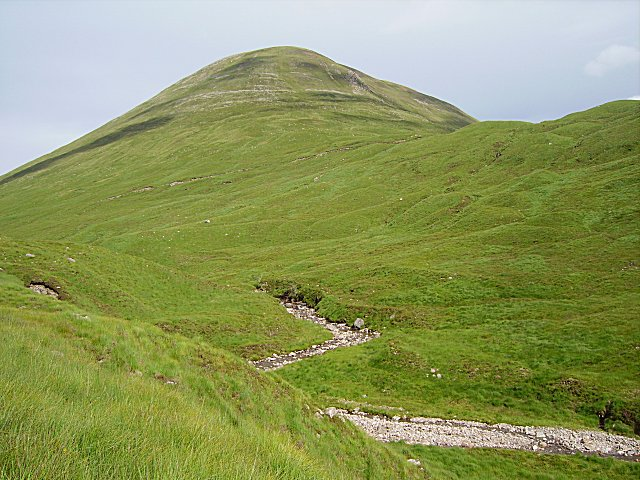
- Meall a' Phubuill

Highest point
- Elevation: 774 m (2,539 ft)
- Prominence: 468 m (1,535 ft)
- Listing: Corbett, Marilyn
- Coordinates: 56°55′04″N 5°14′21″W

Geography
- Location: Lochaber, Scotland
- Parent range: Northwest Highlands
- OS grid: NN029854
- Topo map: OS Landranger 41

Meall a' Phubuill (774 m) is a peak in the Northwest Highlands, Scotland, northwest of Fort William in Lochaber.

A rounded and grassy hill, it stands at the head of Glen Loy, in a little visited area covered by grass and heather moorland. Despite this, the summit ridge is steep.
