= Beinn Ruadh =

Mountain in Scotland

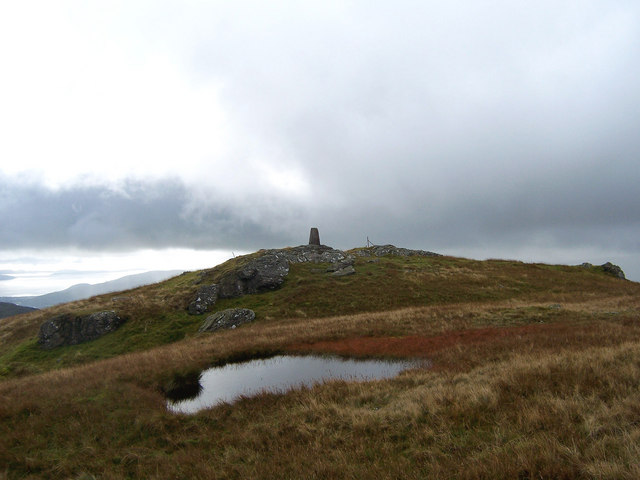
- Beinn Ruadh summit

Highest point
- Elevation: 664 m (2,178 ft)
- Prominence: 501 m (1,644 ft)
- Listing: Graham, Marilyn
- Coordinates: 56°03′08″N 4°57′47″W

Geography
- Location: Argyll and Bute, Scotland
- Parent range: Grampian Mountains
- OS grid: NS155884
- Topo map: OS Landranger 56

Beinn Ruadh (664 m) is a mountain of Argyll and Bute in Scotland. Part of the Grampian Mountains, it lies between Loch Eck and Loch Long in Argyll Forest Park.

A large and sprawling peak, its lower slopes are covered in forestry plantations. The nearest town is Dunoon a few miles to the south.
