= Stob na Cruaiche =

Coordinates: 56.677°N 4.672°W

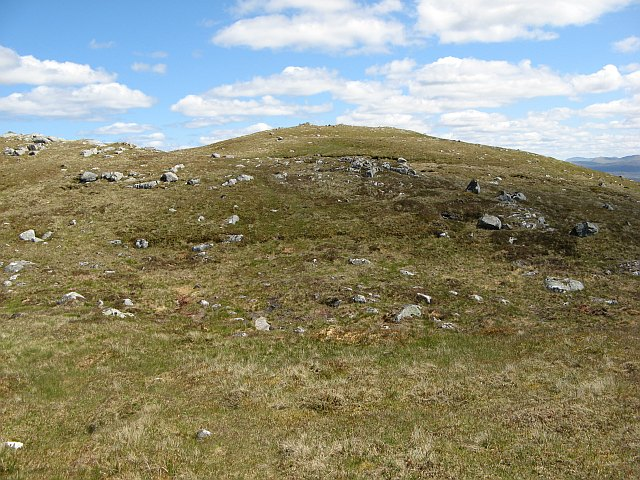
- Looking towards the summit of Stob na Cruaiche

Highest point
- Elevation: 739 m (2,425 ft)
- Prominence: 350 m (1,150 ft)
- Listing: Graham, Marilyn

Geography
- Location: Highland / Perth and Kinross, Scotland
- Parent range: Grampian Mountains
- OS grid: NN363571
- Topo map: OS Landranger 41

Stob na Cruaiche (739 m) is a hill in the Grampian Mountains, Scotland. It lies on the border of Highland and Perthshire, on the northern edge of Rannoch Moor.

A very isolated peak, it takes the form of a long ridge that encloses much of the northern side of Rannoch Moor. It can be reached either from Rannoch station or from Black Corries Lodge to the west.
