= Cruach nan Capull =

Mountain in Scotland

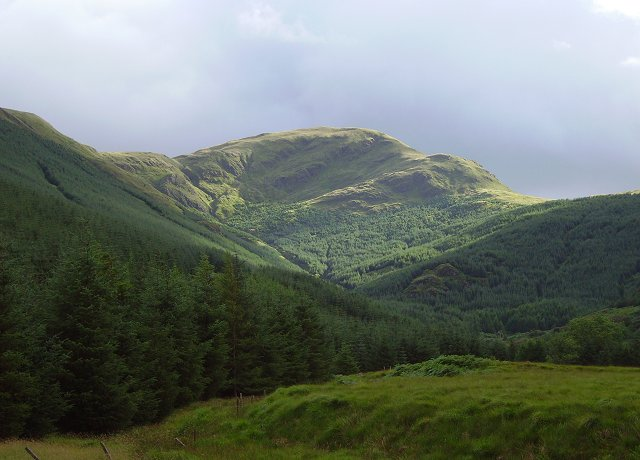
- The northern slopes of Cruach nan Capull

Highest point
- Elevation: 612 m (2,008 ft)
- Prominence: 486 m (1,594 ft)
- Listing: Marilyn, Graham

Geography
- Location: Argyll and Bute, Scotland
- Parent range: Arrochar Alps

Cruach nan Capull is a mountain on the Cowal Peninsula near Loch Striven, in Argyll and Bute, Scotland. It stands on the north western side of Loch Striven, south of Glen Lean, and rises to a height of 612m (2,008 ft).
