= Beinn Talaidh =

Mountain on the Isle of Mull, Scotland

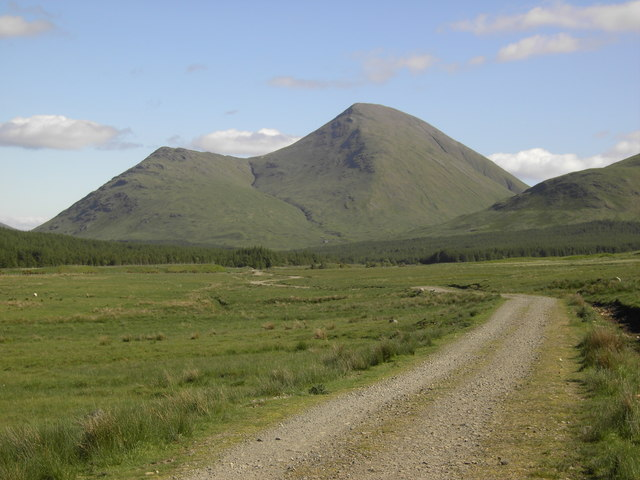
- Beinn Talaidh

Highest point
- Elevation: 762 m (2,500 ft)
- Prominence: 430 m (1,410 ft)
- Listing: Graham, Marilyn
- Coordinates: 56°26′39″N 5°51′19″W

Geography
- Location: Isle of Mull, Scotland
- OS grid: NM625347
- Topo map: OS Landranger 49

Beinn Talaidh (762 m) is a peak on the Isle of Mull, Scotland, located in the mountainous centre of the Island.

The mountain is shaped like a symmetrical cone and can be climbed from the steep facing south side, or more gentle northern side along Glen Forsa. Beinn Talaidh was for many years classed as a Corbett before a resurvey found it to be slightly lower than expected, and it was thus demoted to Graham status; however it is the highest of the 219 Grahams in Scotland.

== See also ==
- List of Graham mountains in Scotland
