= Tiorga Mor =

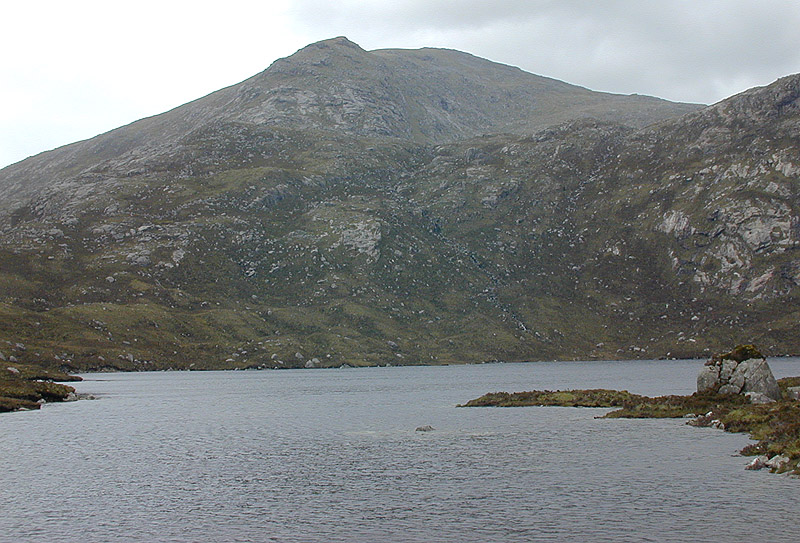
- Tiorga Mor

Highest point
- Elevation: 679 m (2,228 ft)
- Prominence: 588 m (1,929 ft)
- Listing: Graham, Marilyn
- Coordinates: 57°59′41″N 6°59′08″W

Geography
- Location: Harris, Scotland
- OS grid: NB055114
- Topo map: OS Landranger 13, 14

Tiorga Mor (679 m) is a mountain in Harris, in the Outer Hebrides of Scotland.

The most westerly peak of the high mountains of Harris, it is a very rugged peak that provides superb views from its summit.
