= Oireabhal =

Mountain in Harris, Scotland

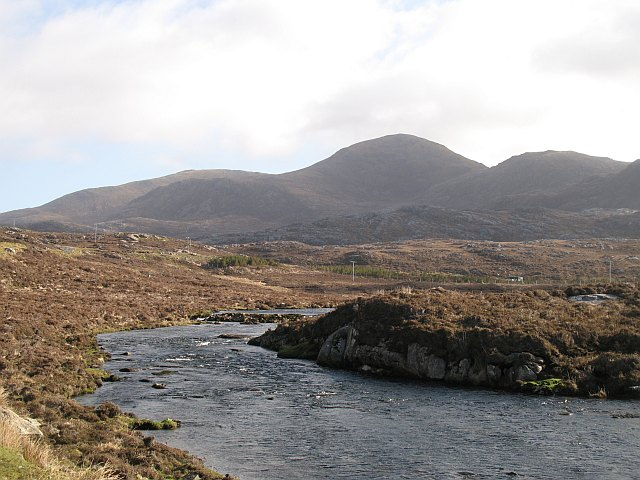
- Oireabhal (middle peak)

Highest point
- Elevation: 662 m (2,172 ft)
- Prominence: 419 m (1,375 ft)
- Listing: Graham, Marilyn
- Coordinates: 57°59′00″N 6°56′07″W

Geography
- Location: Harris, Scotland
- OS grid: NB083099
- Topo map: OS Landranger 13, 14

Oireabhal (662 m) is a mountain in Harris, in the Outer Hebrides of Scotland.

The peak is the highest point on a complex ridge that runs from north to south. The northern side of the mountain includes its finest feature, an overhanging crag known as 'Sron Uladal'.
