= Creag Ghuanach =

Mountain in Scotland

Coordinates: 56.7812°N 4.784°W

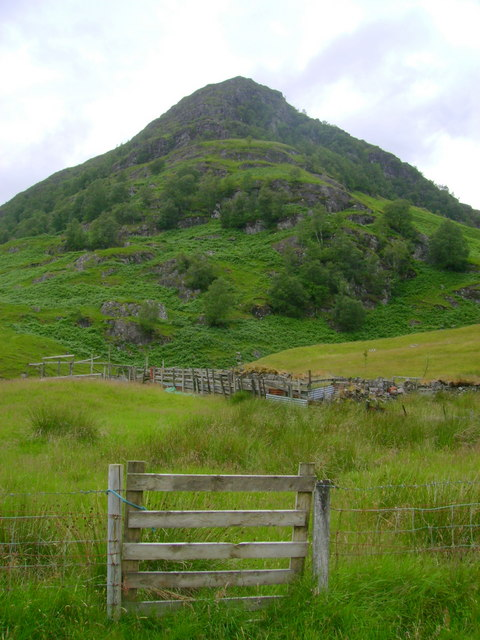
- Creag Ghuanach

Highest point
- Elevation: 621 m (2,037 ft)
- Prominence: 212 m (696 ft)
- Listing: Graham, Marilyn

Geography
- Location: Lochaber, Scotland
- Parent range: Grampian Mountains
- OS grid: NN299690
- Topo map: OS Landranger 41

Creag Ghuanach (621 m) is a mountain in the Grampian Mountains of Scotland. It is located in Lochaber, at the southern head of Loch Treig.

A small but very craggy peak, Creag Ghuanach rises steeply from the loch below. The nearest village is Roybridge several miles to the north.
