= Sgùrr na Coinnich =

Highest peak on the Sleat peninsula at the east end of the Isle of Skye

Coordinates: 57.23651°N 5.71024°W

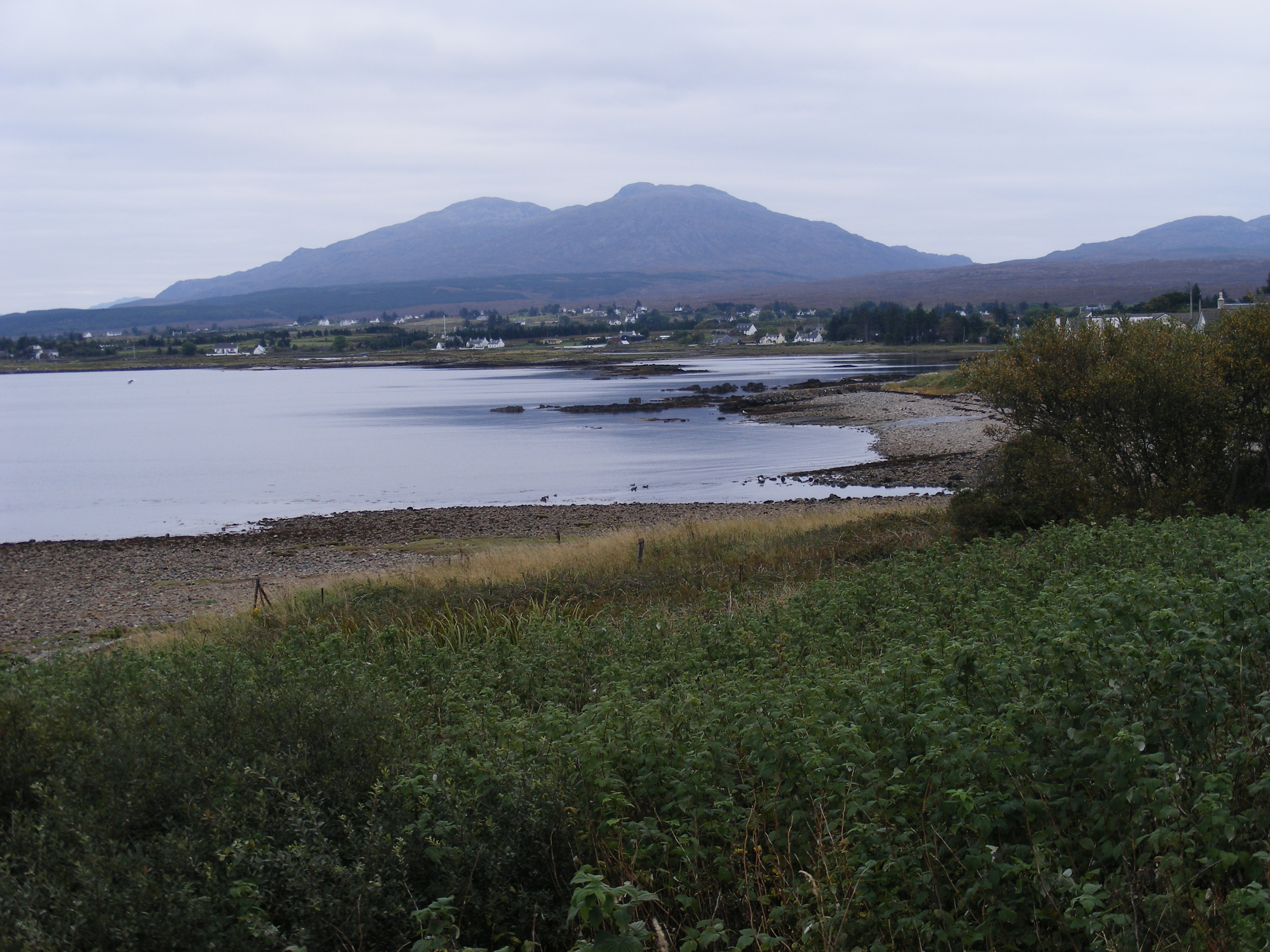
- Beinn na Caillich (l) and Sgùrr na Coinnich (r), seen above the town of Broadford from the west.

Highest point
- Elevation: 739 m (2,425 ft)
- Prominence: 714 m (2,343 ft)Ranked 56th in British Isles
- Parent peak: Blaven
- Listing: Graham, Marilyn

Naming
- English translation: Peak of moss
- Language of name: Scottish Gaelic
- Pronunciation: Scottish Gaelic: [ˈs̪kuːrˠ nə ˈkʰɔːɲɪç]

Geography
- Location: Sleat, Isle of Skye, Scotland
- OS grid: NG762223
- Topo map: OS Landranger 33

Sgùrr na Coinnich is the highest peak on the Sleat peninsula at the east end of the Isle of Skye. Together with its slightly lower neighbour, Beinn na Caillich, it overlooks the Skye Bridge that links the towns of Kyle of Lochalsh and Kyleakin.

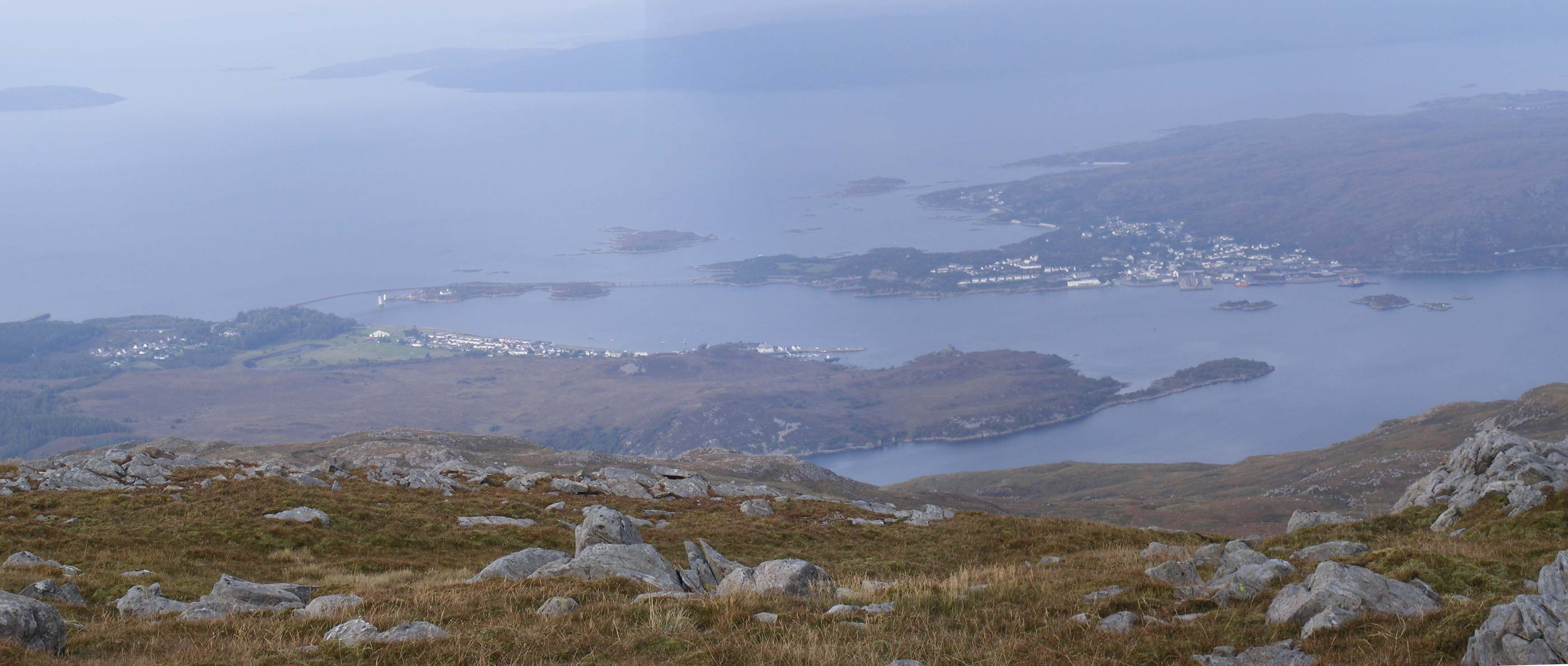
View from the summit to Kyleakin, the Skye Bridge and Kyle of Lochalsh.

The maps suggest that the best starting point is the 278-metre (912-foot) Bealach Uday, which marks the highest point of the minor road from Broadford to Kylerhea and is less than 2 km from the summit. But the terrain immediately to the north of this point is very rough and covered by thick heather.

A series of small but steep local ridges, separated by bogs and oriented perpendicular to the direction of the summit add further to the discomfort of the climber. An alternative and probably easier, albeit longer, route starts at Kylerhea and can include the summit of Beinn na Caillich. Higher up, the terrain becomes smoother and the vegetation shorter.
