= Carnan Cruithneachd =

Mountain in Scotland

Coordinates: 57.278°N 5.329°W

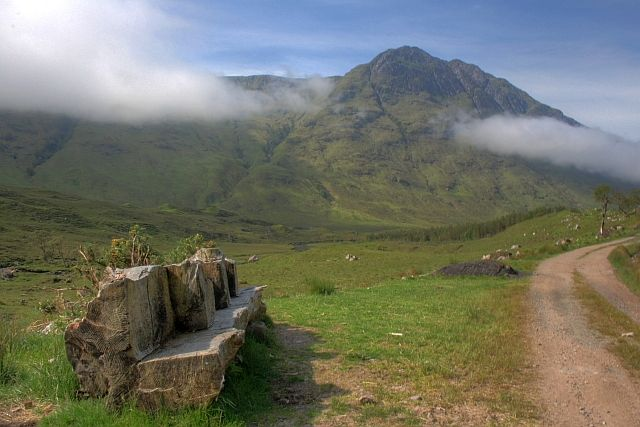
- Carnan Cruithneachd from Glen Elchaig

Highest point
- Elevation: 728 m (2,388 ft)
- Prominence: 220 m (720 ft)
- Listing: Graham, Marilyn

Geography
- Location: Ross-shire, Scotland
- Parent range: Northwest Highlands
- OS grid: NG995258
- Topo map: OS Landranger 25, 33

Carnan Cruithneachd (728 m) is a mountain in the Northwest Highlands of Scotland. It is located in the Kintail area of Ross-shire, on the southern side of Glen Elchaig.

The peak has a very steep northern face, but its other side's are more gentle and form a gentle plateau. The nearest village is Dornie to its west.
