= Beinn na Gucaig =

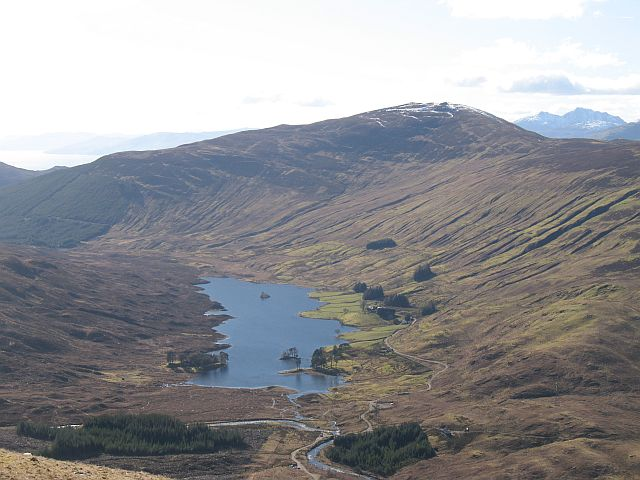
- Beinn na Gucaig

Highest point
- Elevation: 616 m (2,021 ft)
- Prominence: 451 m (1,480 ft)
- Listing: Graham, Marilyn
- Coordinates: 56°44′21″N 5°10′08″W

Geography
- Location: Lochaber, Scotland
- Parent range: Grampian Mountains
- OS grid: NN062653
- Topo map: OS Landranger 41

Beinn na Gucaig (616 m) is a mountain in the Grampian Mountains of Scotland, located south of Fort William in Lochaber.

The peak takes up much of the eastern shore of Loch Linnhe and provides an excellent view of Ben Nevis from its summit.
