= Glen Loy =

Valley in Scotland

Coordinates: 56.904°N 5.097°W

Glen Loy is a glen or valley in the Northwest Highlands of Scotland which opens onto the Great Glen at its eastern end. It is drained by the River Loy which rises at a low col just under 230m above sea level as numerous burns drain the hillsides of Druim Fada on the south side and Druim Gleann Laoigh on the north. Further tributary burns drain the southwestern slopes of Beinn Bhàn, a 771m high Corbett and Marilyn to the northeast of the lower part of the glen. A minor road stretches up the valley from the B8004 road at Loy Bridge crossing the river once at Inverskilavulin Bridge before reaching a cul-de-sac short of Achanellan. A private vehicle track continues westwards up the glen from that point and in turn becomes a footpath which continues over the col and down through Gleann Suileag beyond.

The glen has been carved through rocks of the Moine succession, specifically those of the Upper Garry Psammite Formation contained within the Loch Eil Group, a sequence of metamorphosed rocks of probable marine origin dating from the Neoproterozoic era. The lower (eastern) end of the glen is formed in silica-poor igneous rocks which are part of the Glen Loy Complex. This hornblende gabbro and diorite was intruded during the Silurian period in the course of the Caledonian Orogeny.

Much of the lower part of the glen is owned and managed by Forestry and Land Scotland (formerly Forestry Commission Scotland) as commercial forestry plantation though remnants of deciduous and native Scots pine woodland remain at Coille Phuiteachain which has been protected as a reserve since 1931.

Clan history:

- Clan Chattan
- Clan Cameron
