= Cat Law =

Hill in Angus, Scotland

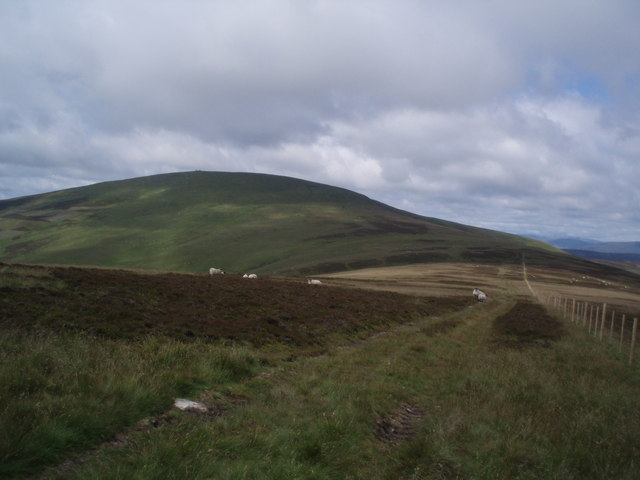
- Cat Law

Highest point
- Elevation: 671 m (2,201 ft)
- Prominence: 296 m (971 ft)
- Listing: Graham, Marilyn
- Coordinates: 56°44′08″N 3°06′53″W

Geography
- Location: Angus, Scotland
- Parent range: The Mounth
- OS grid: NO318610
- Topo map: OS Landranger 44

Cat Law (671 m) is a hill in the southern Mounth of Scotland, north of Kirriemuir in Angus.

A rounded peak, it lies above Strathmore in the south and offers excellent views across the Angus countryside from its summit. It is usually climbed from the nearby village of Balintore.
