= Uisgneabhal Mor =

Mountain in Harris, Outer Hebrides, Scotland

Uisgnabhal Mor
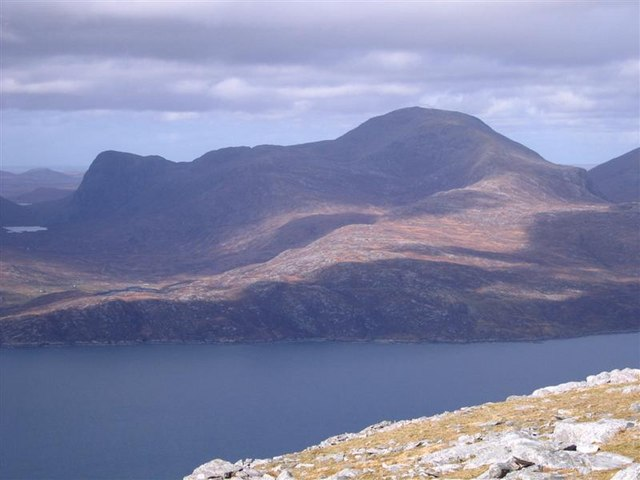
- Uisgnabhal Mor

Highest point
- Elevation: 729 m (2,392 ft)
- Prominence: 482 m (1,581 ft)
- Listing: Graham, Marilyn
- Coordinates: 57°58′22″N 6°52′16″W

Geography
- Location: Harris, Scotland
- OS grid: NB121085
- Topo map: OS Landranger 13, 14

Uisgnabhal Mor (729 m) is a mountain in Harris, in the Outer Hebrides of Scotland.

A complex mountain of several ridges and summits, it lies in the centre of the mountains of Harris, and offers fine views from its summit.
