= Beinn Dhorain =

Mountain in Highland, Scotland

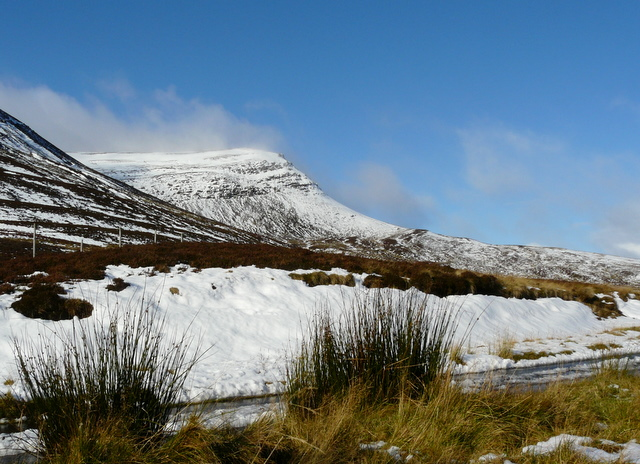
- Beinn Dhorain

Highest point
- Elevation: 628 m (2,060 ft)
- Prominence: 416 m (1,365 ft)
- Listing: Graham, Marilyn
- Coordinates: 58°07′00″N 3°49′34″W

Geography
- Location: Sutherland, Scotland
- Parent range: Northwest Highlands
- OS grid: NC925156
- Topo map: OS Landranger 17

Beinn Dhorain (628 m) is a mountain in the Northwest Highlands. It lies in Sutherland in the far north of Scotland, west of the village of Helmsdale.A rounded sandstone peak, it rises steeply above Glen Loth.
