= Scaraben =

Coordinates: 58.220°N 3.593°W

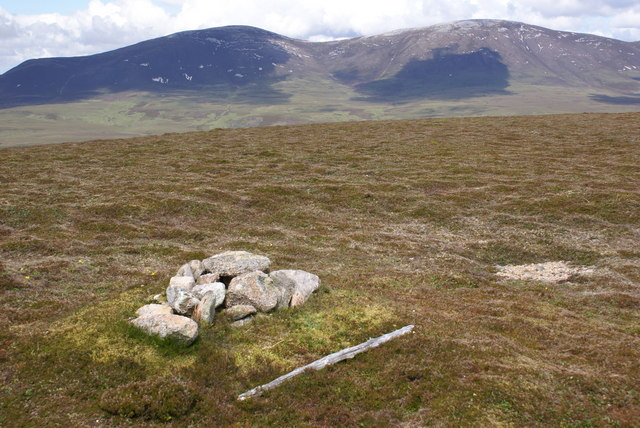
- Scaraben, with the main summit on the right

Highest point
- Elevation: 626 m (2,054 ft)
- Prominence: 331 m (1,086 ft)
- Listing: Graham, Marilyn

Geography
- Location: Caithness, Scotland
- Parent range: Northwest Highlands
- OS grid: ND066268
- Topo map: OS Landranger 17

Scaraben (626 m) is a hill in the Northwest Highlands of Scotland. It lies in the Caithness region, in the far north.

Taking the form of a long ridge over 4 km in length, the hill consists of three rounded peaks. The Caithness coast is visible from its summit. Coastal Berriedale is the nearest village.
