= Creag Dhubh (Roybridge) =

Scottish hill

Coordinates: 56.903°N 4.756°W

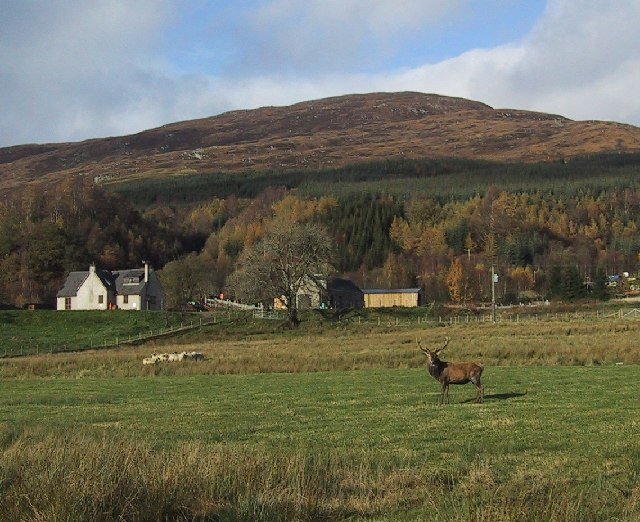
- Creag Dhubh from Glen Spean

Highest point
- Elevation: 658 m (2,159 ft)
- Prominence: 332 m (1,089 ft)
- Listing: Graham, Marilyn

Geography
- Location: Lochaber, Scotland
- Parent range: Grampian Mountains
- OS grid: NN322824
- Topo map: OS Landranger 34, 41

Creag Dhubh (658 m) is a hill in the Grampian Mountains of Scotland. It is located in the Lochaber region, east of Roybridge.

A rounded hill, Creag Dhubh separates Glen Spean to the south and lower Glen Roy to the north.
