= Blackwaterfoot =

Coordinates: 55.502°N 5.333°W

Blackwaterfoot: Scottish Gaelic: Bun na Uisge Dubh
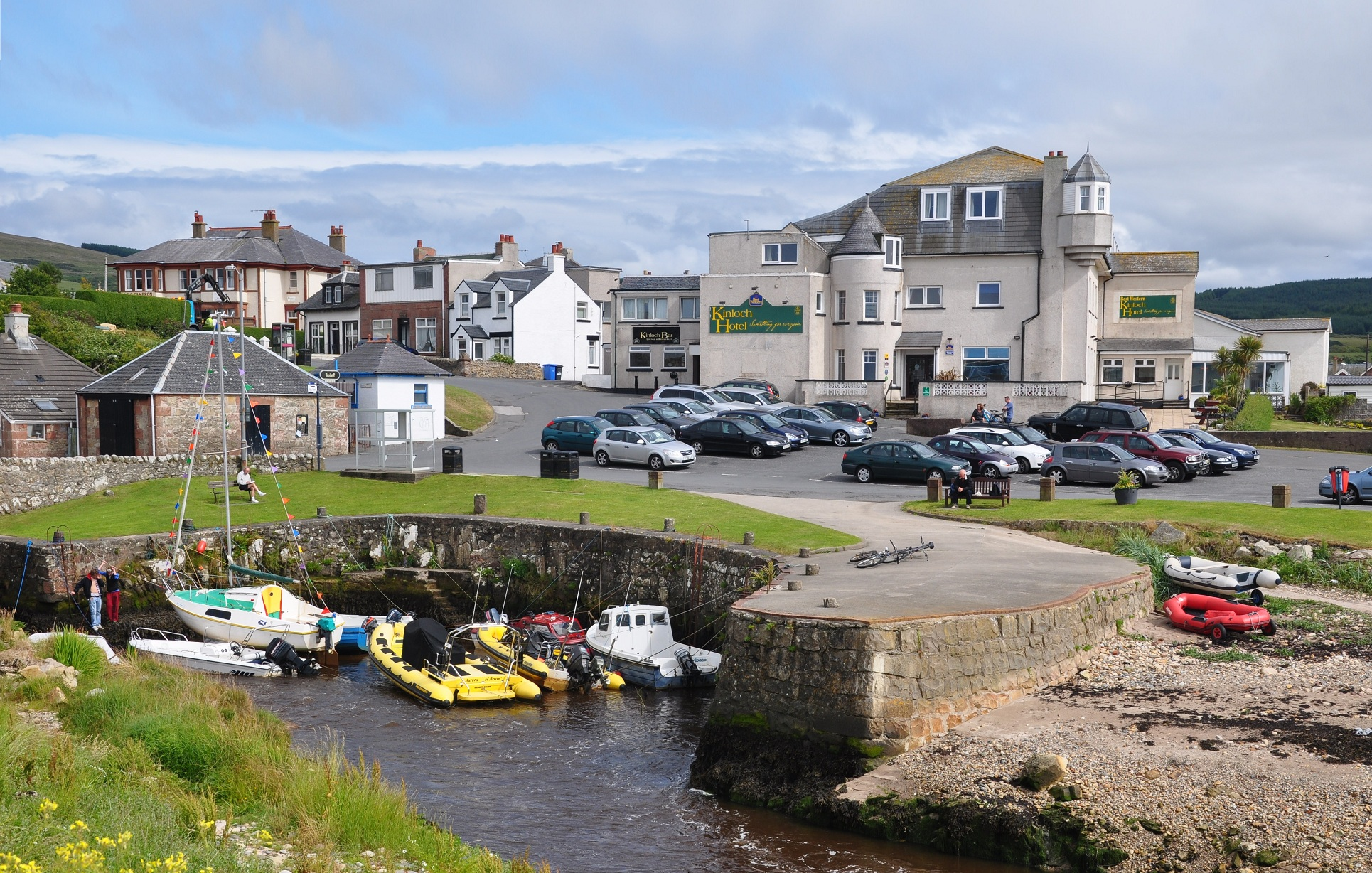
- Village centre with tiny harbour

- Location within North Ayrshire
- OS grid reference: NR895281
- Civil parish: Kilmory
- Council area: North Ayrshire
- Lieutenancy area: Ayrshire and Arran
- Country: Scotland
- Sovereign state: United Kingdom
- Post town: ISLE OF ARRAN
- Postcode district: KA27
- Dialling code: 01770
- Police: Scotland
- Fire: Scottish
- Ambulance: Scottish
- UK Parliament: North Ayrshire and Arran
- Scottish Parliament: Cunninghame North

Blackwaterfoot (Scottish Gaelic: Bun na Uisge Dubh lit. 'foot of the black water') is a village on the Isle of Arran in the Firth of Clyde, Scotland. The village is within the parish of Kilmory. It is located in the Shiskine valley in the south-west of the island. It is one of the smaller villages of Arran and home to one of Europe's two 12-hole golf courses. Nearby Drumadoon Point is home to the largest Iron Age fort on Arran. Further north is the King's Cave, reputed to be a hiding place of Robert the Bruce.

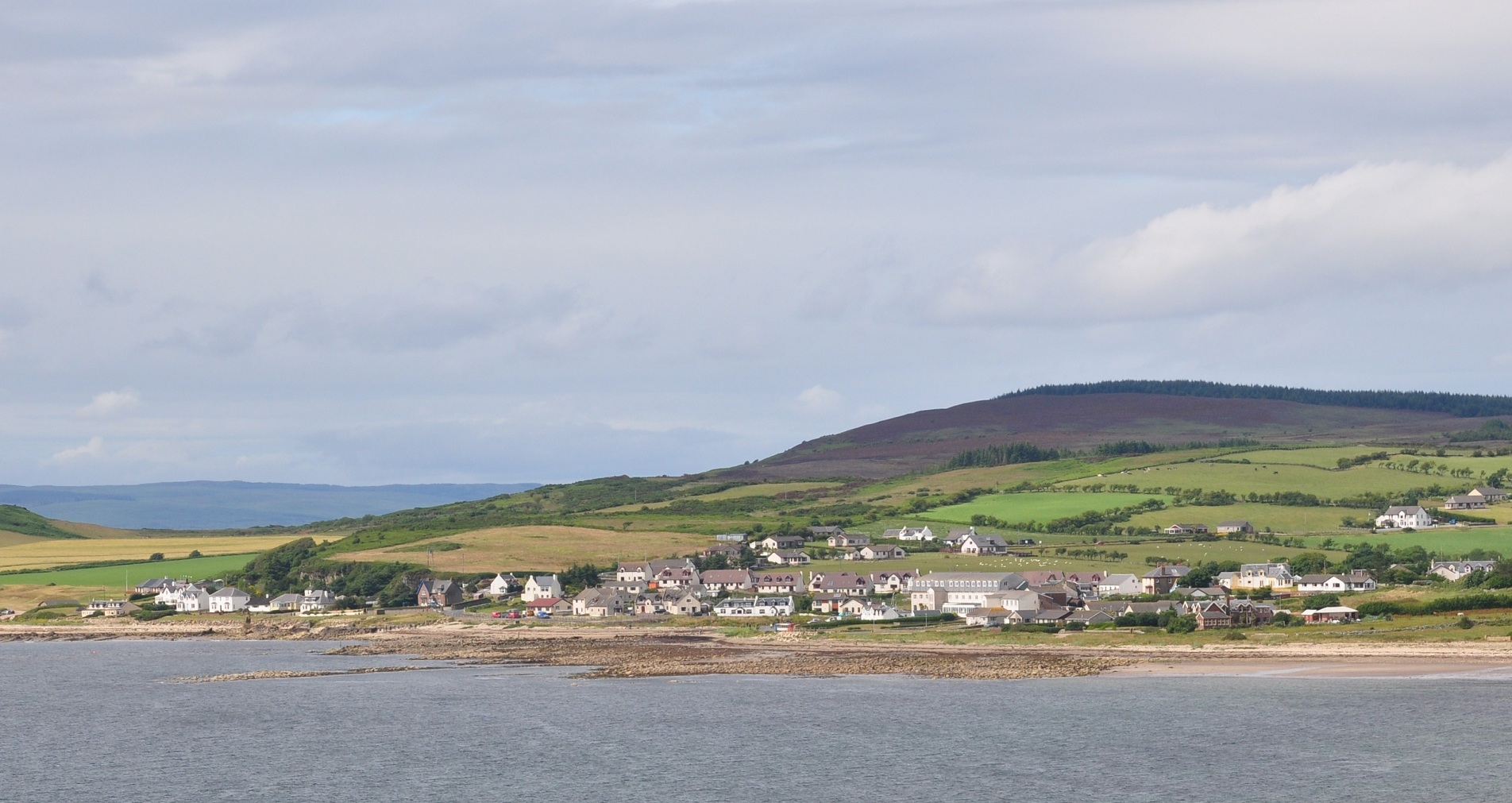
View of Blackwaterfoot from the south

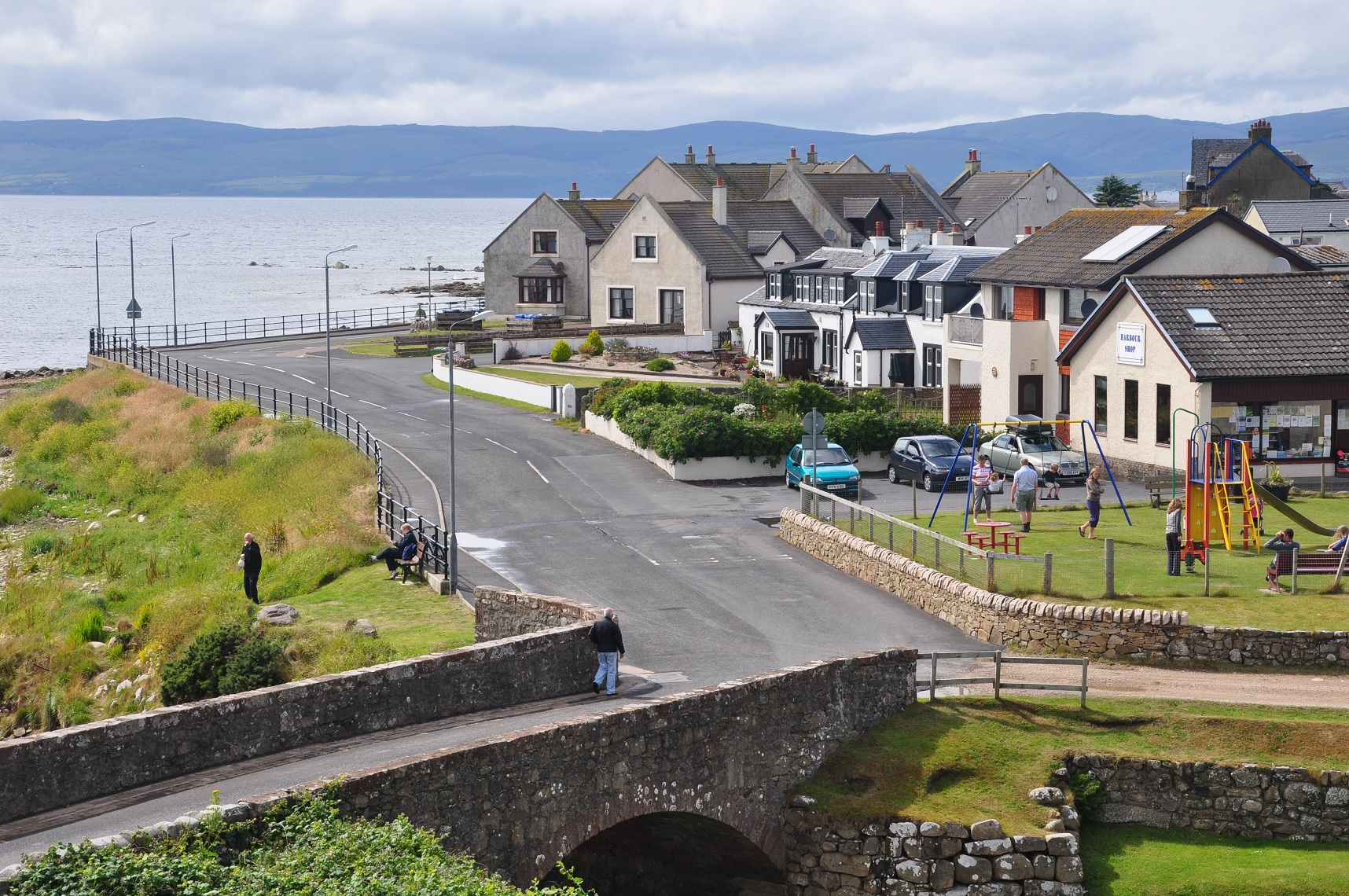
Village centre with Harbour Shop, looking west toward Kintyre
