= Meall nan Aighean =

Coordinates: 56.6206°N 4.1287°W

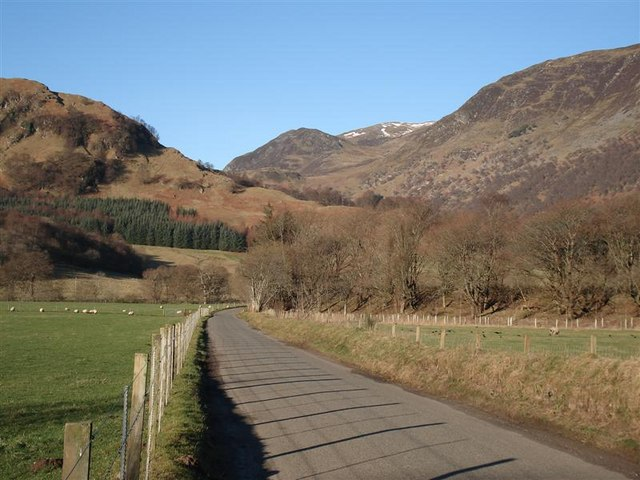
- Entrance to Glen Lyon. Meall nan Aighean is the highest point in the background.

Highest point
- Elevation: 981 m (3,219 ft)
- Prominence: 136 m (446 ft)
- Listing: Munro

Naming
- English translation: Hill of the heifers or hinds
- Language of name: Gaelic

Geography
- Location: Perth and Kinross, Scotland
- Parent range: Grampians
- OS grid: NN694496
- Topo map: OS Landranger 51, OS Explorer 378

Meall nan Aighean is a Scottish mountain in the council area of Perth and Kinross. It stands in a group of four Munros known as the Càrn Mairg group or the Glen Lyon Horseshoe on the north side of Glen Lyon. It is often climbed as part of the circuit of the Càrn Mairg Munros, which stand in a curving arc around the Invervar Burn.

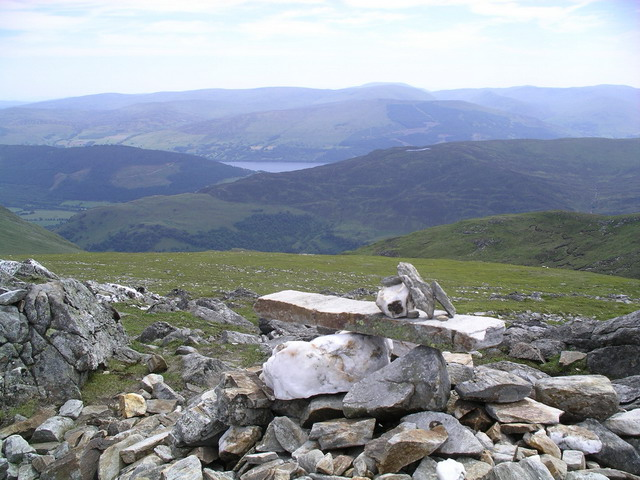
The summit cairn of Meall nan Aighean with Loch Tay in the background

== See also ==
- List of geographical mealls
