= Creach-Beinn (Mull) =

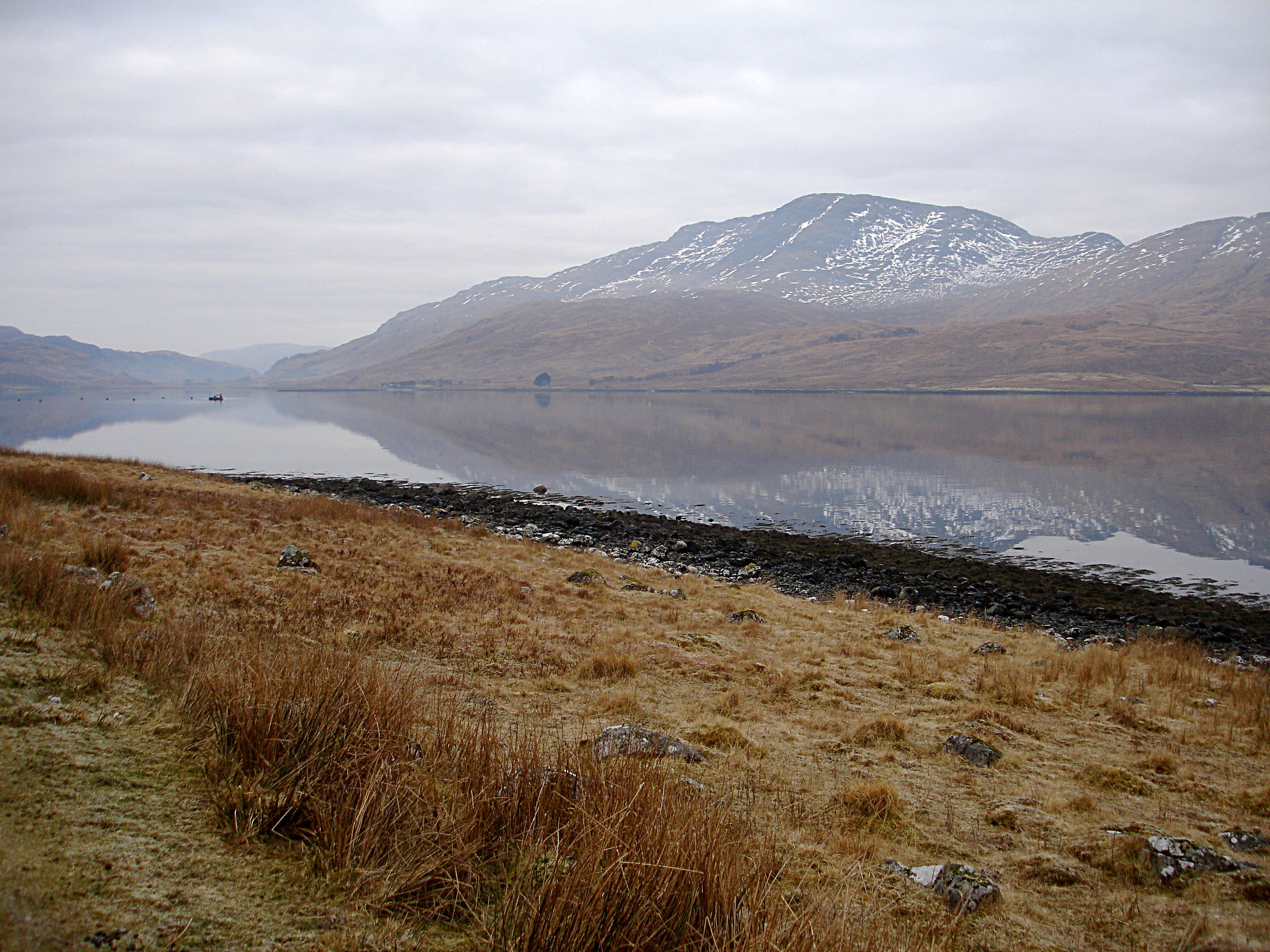
- Creach-Beinn from the southern shore of Loch Spelve

Highest point
- Elevation: 698 m (2,290 ft)
- Prominence: 514 m (1,686 ft)
- Listing: Graham, Marilyn
- Coordinates: 56°22′55″N 5°49′11″W

Geography
- Location: Isle of Mull, Scotland
- OS grid: NM642276
- Topo map: OS Landranger 49

Creach-Beinn (698 m) is a mountain in the south of the Isle of Mull, Scotland. It rises above the northern shore of Loch Spelve.

A rocky mountain with good views from its summit, Creach-Beinn is usually climbed from the settlement of Lochbuie.
