= Ben Armine =

Hill in Scotland

Coordinates: 58.215°N 4.224°W

- Creag a' Choire Ghlais
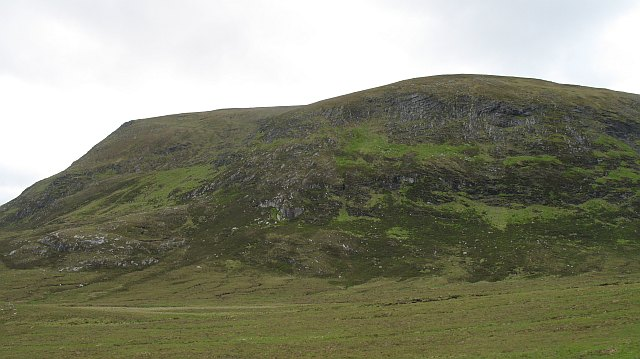
- Ben Armine summit

Highest point
- Elevation: 705 m (2,313 ft)
- Prominence: 243 m (797 ft)
- Listing: Graham, Marilyn

Geography
- Location: Sutherland, Scotland
- Parent range: Northwest Highlands
- OS grid: NC695273
- Topo map: OS Landranger 16

Ben Armine (705 m) is a remote hill in Sutherland in the far north of Scotland. It lies in inland, north of the village of Lairg.

The best known summit of a range of hills lying southeast of Ben Klibreck, its southern neighbour Creag Mhor is slightly higher.
