= Beinn Mheadhoin (Morvern) =

Mountain in Morvern, Highland, Scotland

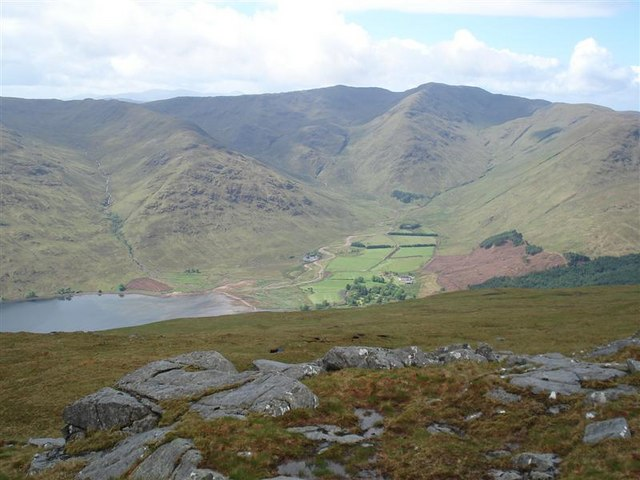
- Beinn Mheadhoin

Highest point
- Elevation: 739 m (2,425 ft)
- Prominence: 568 m (1,864 ft)
- Listing: Graham, Marilyn
- Coordinates: 56°36′12″N 5°35′15″W

Geography
- Location: Lochaber, Scotland
- Parent range: Northwest Highlands
- OS grid: NM799514
- Topo map: OS Landranger 49

Beinn Mheadhoin (739 m) is a mountain in the Northwest Highlands of Scotland. It is located in the Morvern area of Lochaber.

A peak of various ridges with a fine summit, it lies close to the settlement of Glensanda. A huge granite quarry has taken chunks out of its southern slopes.
