= Beinn a' Chearcaill =

Coordinates: 57.617°N 5.466°W

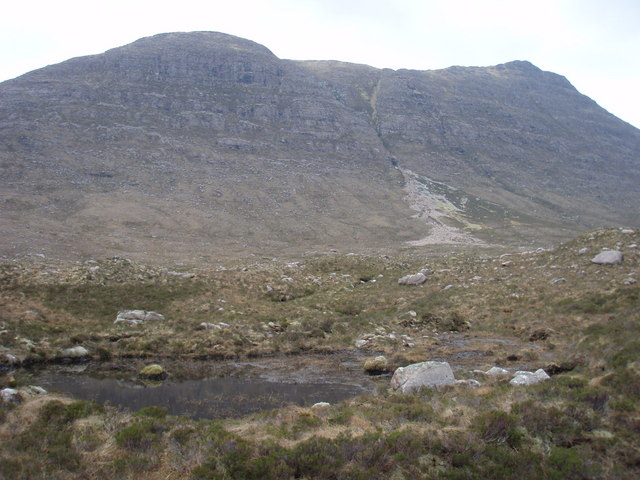
- Beinn a' Chearcaill

Highest point
- Elevation: 725 m (2,379 ft)
- Prominence: 368 m (1,207 ft)
- Listing: Graham, Marilyn

Geography
- Location: Wester Ross, Scotland
- Parent range: Torridon Hills, Northwest Highlands
- OS grid: NG931638
- Topo map: OS Landranger 19

Beinn a' Chearcaill (725 m) is a mountain in the Torridon Hills of northwest Scotland. It lies south of Loch Maree in Wester Ross.

The peak has very steep slopes to the south and west, making it an excellent viewpoint for its illustrious Torridon neighbors such as Liathach and Beinn Eighe. Climbs usually start from its northern side.
