= Hartaval =

Hill on the Isle of Skye, Scotland

Coordinates: 57.515722°N 6.209519°W

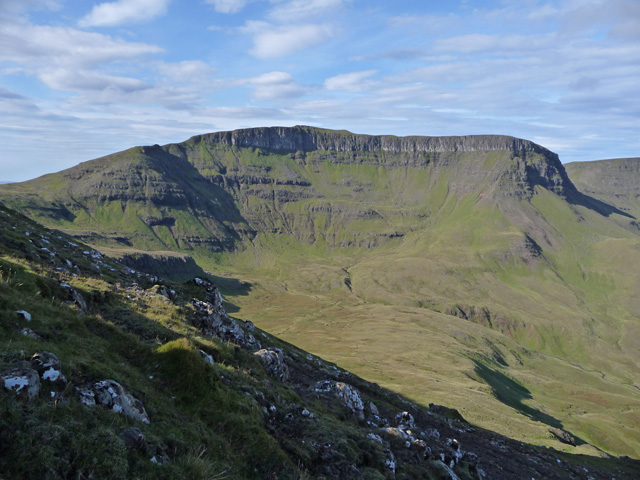
- Hartaval

Highest point
- Elevation: 669 m (2,195 ft)
- Prominence: 180 m (590 ft)
- Parent peak: The Storr
- Listing: Marilyn, Graham

Geography
- Location: Skye, Scotland
- Parent range: Trotternish
- OS grid: NG480551
- Topo map: OS Landranger 23

Hartaval (669 m) is a hill on the Isle of Skye. It is located on the Trotternish peninsula in the north of the isle, and is the second highest peak on Trotternish ridge after The Storr.

It has a fine, steep face on its eastern side that was formed by a series of landslides.
