= Beinn Bharrain =

Mountain on the Isle of Arran, Scotland

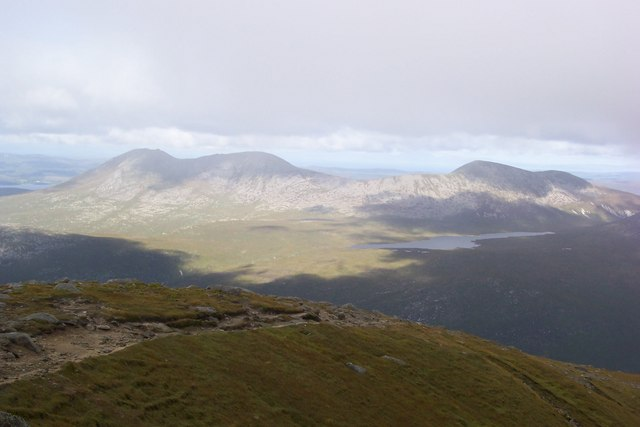
- Beinn Bharrain seen from Beinn Tarsuinn

Highest point
- Elevation: 721 m (2,365 ft)
- Prominence: 380 m (1,250 ft)
- Listing: Graham, Marilyn
- Coordinates: 55°37′59″N 5°20′06″W

Geography
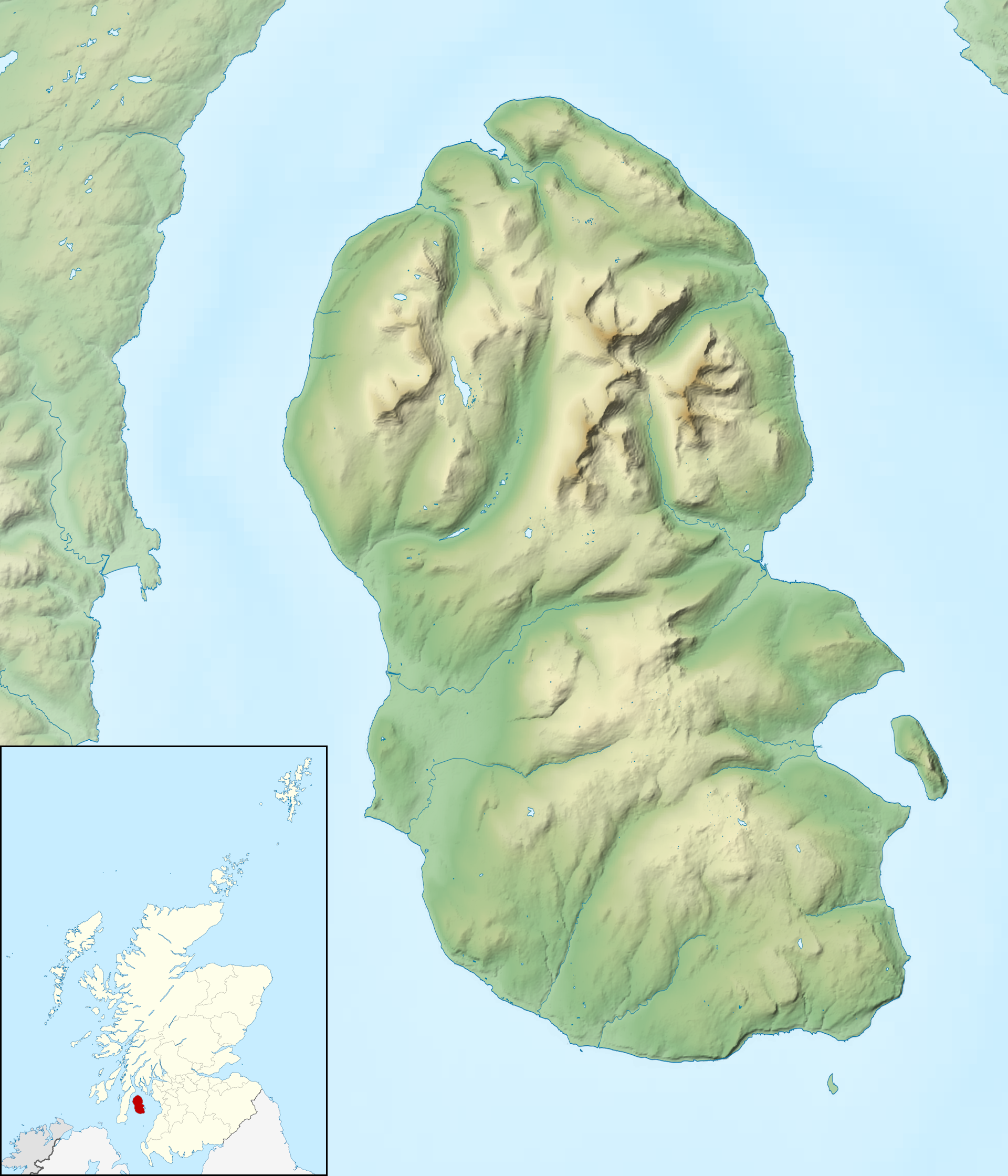
- Location within Arran
- Location: Isle of Arran, North Ayrshire, Scotland
- Parent range: Northwest Highlands
- OS grid: NR902428
- Topo map: OS Landranger 62, 69

Beinn Bharrain (721 m) is a mountain on the Isle of Arran, Scotland, located in the far northwest of the Island.

Despite being less frequently visited than its eastern neighbours, it still provides fine views from the top. The entire hill is known as Beinn Bharrain, with 'Mullach Buidhe' the highest of its summits.
