= Ben Buie =

Mountain in Scotland

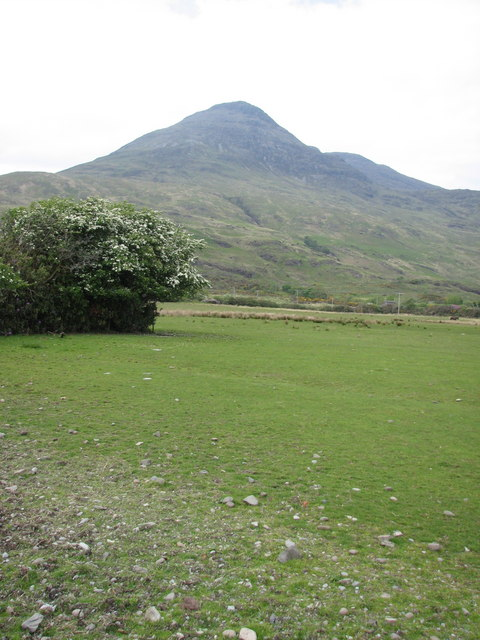
- Ben Buie

Highest point
- Elevation: 717 m (2,352 ft)
- Prominence: 514 m (1,686 ft)
- Listing: Graham, Marilyn
- Coordinates: 56°22′31″N 5°52′54″W

Geography
- Location: Isle of Mull, Scotland
- OS grid: NM604270
- Topo map: OS Landranger 49

Ben Buie (717 m) is a mountain in the south of the Isle of Mull, Scotland.

A rocky mountain, it has steep and rugged slopes, especially on its eastern face.
