= Druim Fada (Corpach) =

Mountain in Scotland

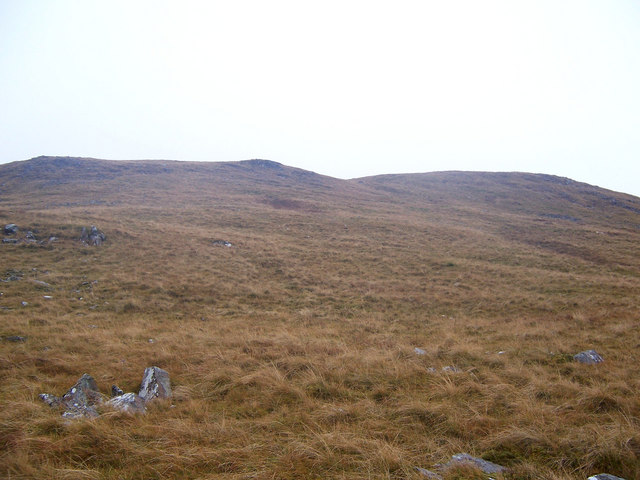
- Grassy Moorland below the ridge of Druim Fada

Highest point
- Elevation: 744 m (2,441 ft)
- Prominence: 516 m (1,693 ft)
- Listing: Graham, Marilyn
- Coordinates: 56°53′35″N 5°08′31″W

Geography
- Location: Lochaber, Scotland
- Parent range: Northwest Highlands
- OS grid: NN087823
- Topo map: OS Landranger 41

Druim Fada (744 m) is a mountain in the Northwest Highlands of Scotland. It lies on the northern shore of Loch Eil in Lochaber, near the village of Corpach.

Taking the form of a long ridge running east to west, the peak is mostly grassy in nature although it has a number of shallow corries on its northern side. Its summit is known as Stob a' Ghrianain.
