= Beinn na Caillich (Red Hills) =

Mountain in Scotland

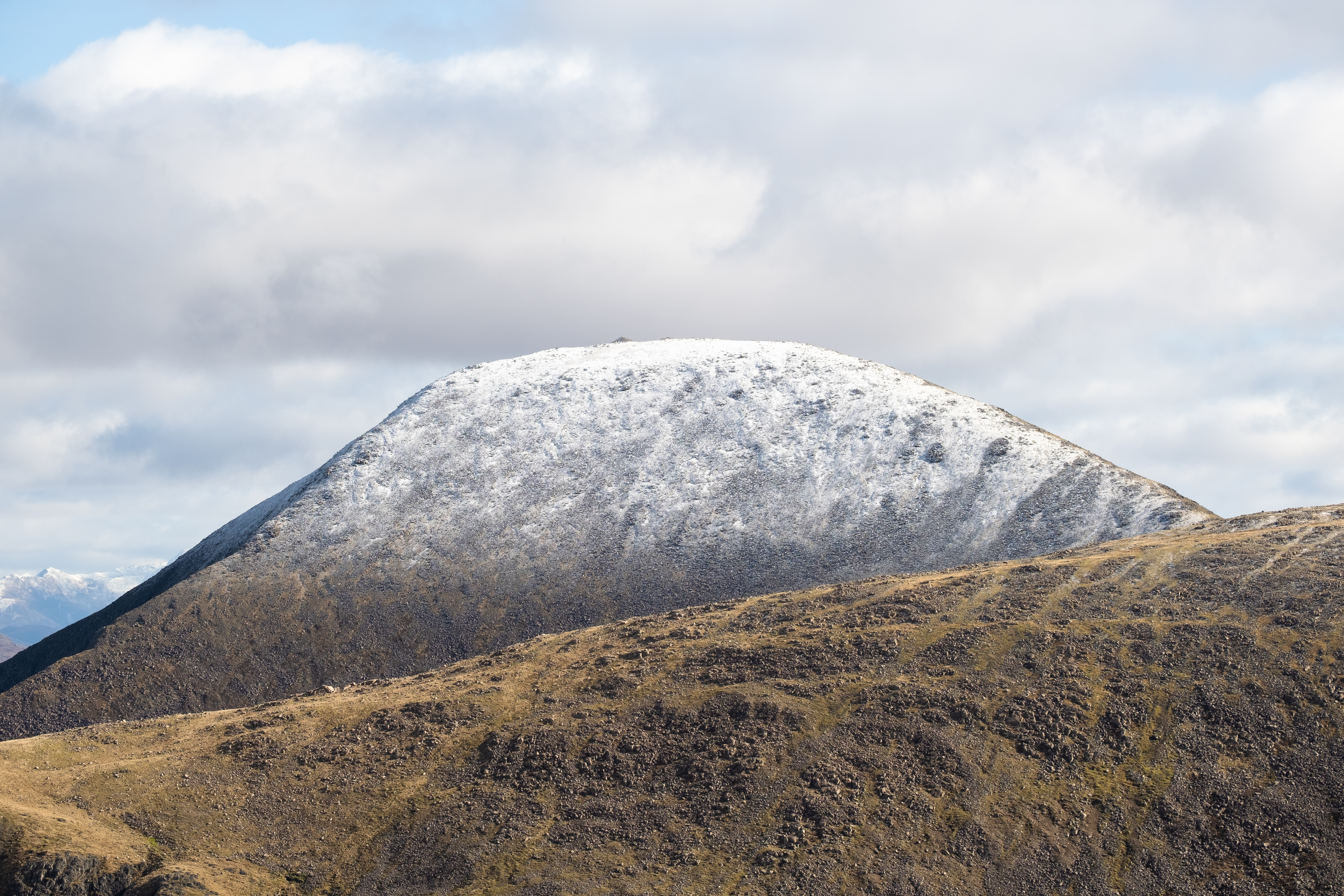
- Beinn na Caillich from Beinn na Cro

Highest point
- Elevation: 732 m (2,402 ft)
- Prominence: 696 m (2,283 ft)
- Listing: Graham, Marilyn
- Coordinates: 57°14′16″N 05°58′34″W

Naming
- English translation: mountain of the old woman
- Language of name: Gaelic
- Pronunciation: Scottish Gaelic: [peɲ ə ˈkʰaʎɪç]

Geography
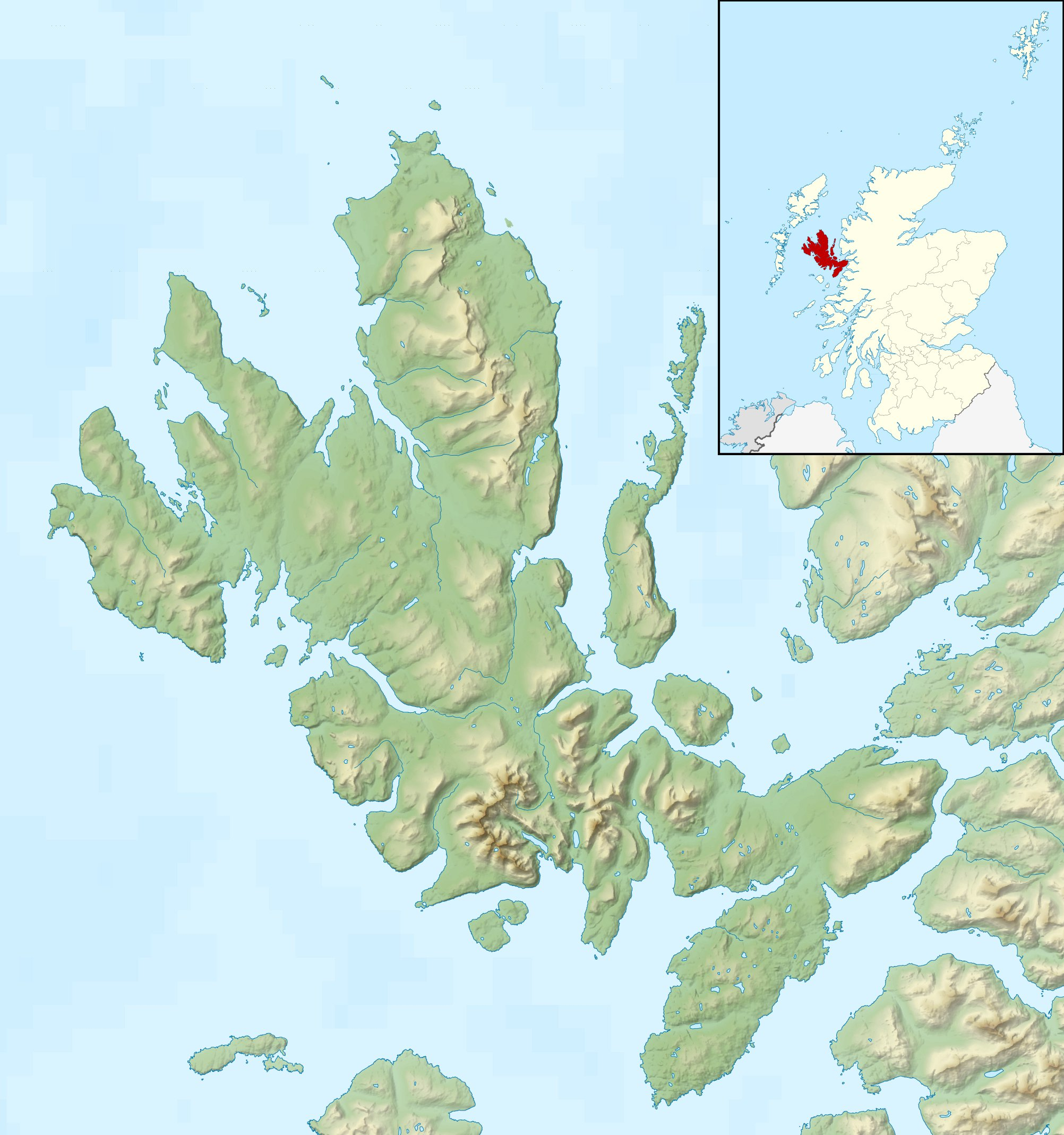
- Location within Isle of Skye
- Location: Skye, Scotland
- Parent range: Red Hills
- OS grid: NG601233

Beinn na Caillich (Scottish Gaelic for 'mountain of the old woman or Cailleach') is a mountain with a height of 732 metres (2,402 ft), west of Broadford on the Isle of Skye, Scotland. It is one of the Red Hills, or Red Cuillin. There is another Beinn na Caillich at Kyle Rhea on Skye, with an identical height.

== History and folklore ==
The summit is adorned by an especially large cairn, reputedly marking the site where Saucy Mary, a Norwegian princess and former resident of Castle Moil in Kyleakin, is buried. Local legend claims that she was buried at the top of the mountain so that she could face the land of her birth forever. An alternative version of events suggests the monument was dedicated to "a gigantic woman in the days of Fingal". Thomas Pennant climbed the hill while staying with Mackinnon of Corriechatachan (or Corry); Samuel Johnson and James Boswell did not.

On the eastern slopes is Goir a' Bhlàir, "the field of battle" (grid reference NG624234). The battle concerned was apparently a decisive action by the Gaelic Clan Mackinnon against the Norsemen
