= Beinn na h-Eaglaise (Graham) =

Mountain in Scotland

Coordinates: 57.512°N 5.494°W

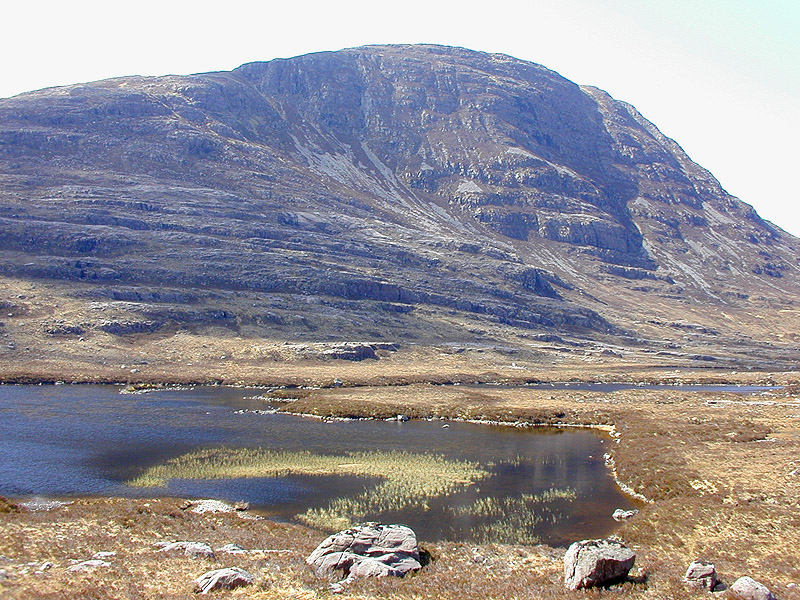
- Beinn na h-Eaglaise

Highest point
- Elevation: 736 m (2,415 ft)
- Prominence: 305 m (1,001 ft)
- Listing: Graham, Marilyn

Geography
- Location: Wester Ross, Scotland
- Parent range: Northwest Highlands
- OS grid: NG909523
- Topo map: OS Landranger 25

Beinn na h-Eaglaise (736 m) is a mountain in the Northwest Highlands of Scotland. It lies in Wester Ross, south of the village of Torridon.

A steep mountain, it has a very craggy north east face and is almost entirely surrounded by stalker's paths. The view from the summit takes in the peak's famous neighbours such as the Munros Liathach and Maol Cheann-dearg.
