= Meall Mheinnidh =

Coordinates: 57.716°N 5.436°W

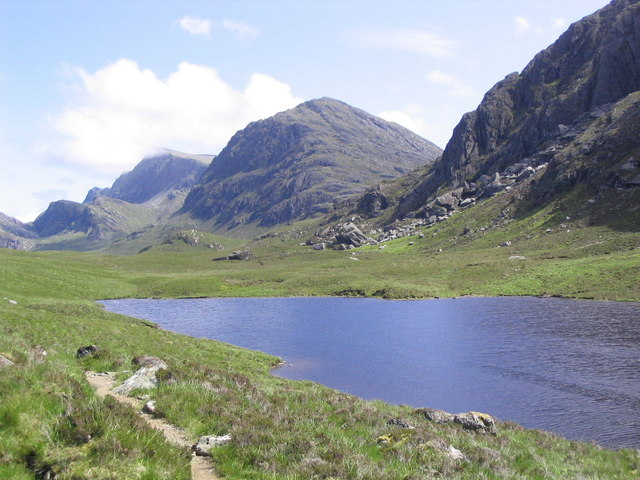
- Meall Mheinnidh (centre)

Highest point
- Elevation: 722 m (2,369 ft)
- Prominence: 227 m (745 ft)
- Listing: Graham, Marilyn

Geography
- Location: Wester Ross, Scotland
- Parent range: Northwest Highlands
- OS grid: NG955748
- Topo map: OS Landranger 19

Meall Mheinnidh (722 m) is a mountain in the Northwest Highlands of Scotland. It lies in the Wester Ross region, north of Loch Maree.

A very remote peak, it is characterised by its very steep northern face, like its neighbours Beinn Lair and Beinn Airigh Charr. The nearest village is Poolewe to the west.
