= Beinn an Eoin (Coigach) =

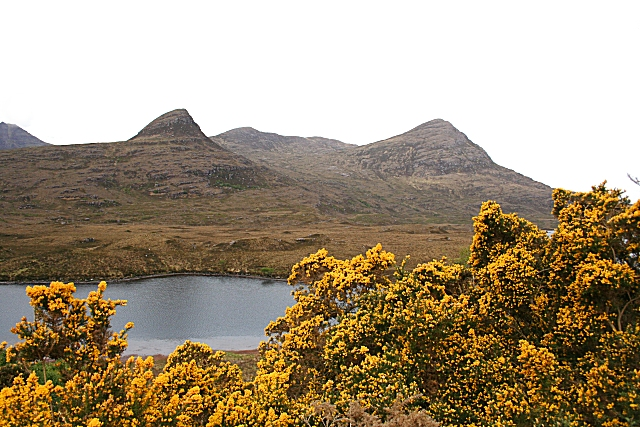
- Beinn an Eoin with its subsidiary peak Sgurr Tuath on the right

Highest point
- Elevation: 619 m (2,031 ft)
- Prominence: 355 m (1,165 ft)
- Listing: Graham, Marilyn
- Coordinates: 58°00′23″N 5°12′32″W

Geography
- Location: Coigach, Scotland
- Parent range: Northwest Highlands
- OS grid: NC104064
- Topo map: OS Landranger 15

Beinn an Eoin (619 m) is a mountain in the Northwest Highlands of Scotland. It lies in the remote Coigach area in the far northwest of Scotland, north of Ullapool.

One of the magnificent Coigach peaks, Beinn an Eoin has long crags on its western side and a notable subsidiary peak, Sgurr Tuath, to its north. The nearest settlement is Strathkanaird.
