= Meall Mor (Glen Coe) =

Mountain in Scotland

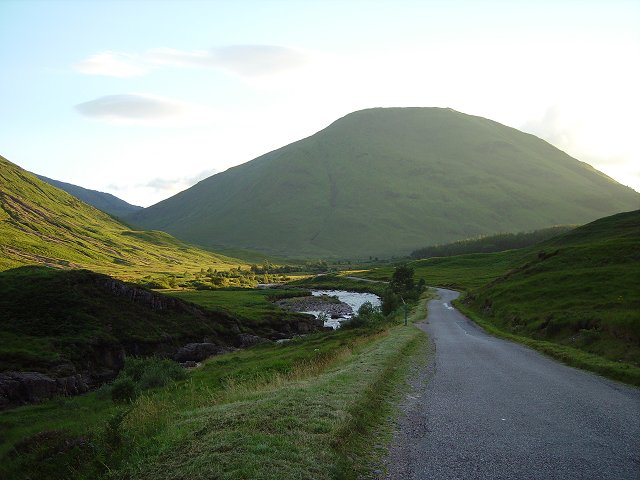
- Meall Mor from the old Glen Coe road

Highest point
- Elevation: 676 m (2,218 ft)
- Prominence: 304 m (997 ft)
- Listing: Graham, Marilyn
- Coordinates: 56°39′24″N 5°05′33″W

Geography
- Location: Lochaber, Scotland
- Parent range: Grampian Mountains
- OS grid: NN106559
- Topo map: OS Landranger 41

Meall Mor (676 m) is a mountain in the Grampian Mountains of Scotland. It lies above the Glencoe village at the foot of Glen Coe in Lochaber.

A flat topped peak with steep and craggy slopes, it is surrounded by Munros.
