= Meall Mor (Loch Katrine) =

Mountain in the Grampian Mountains of Scotland

Coordinates: 56.301°N 4.613°W

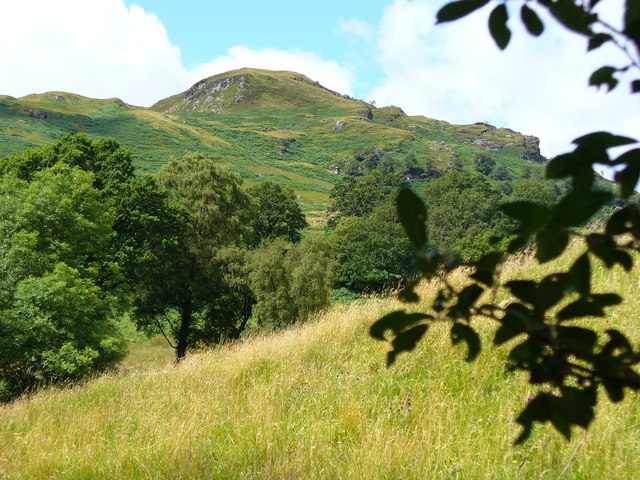
- Meall Mor

Highest point
- Elevation: 747 m (2,451 ft)
- Prominence: 262 m (860 ft)
- Listing: Graham, Marilyn

Geography
- Location: Stirling, Scotland
- Parent range: Grampian Mountains
- OS grid: NN383151
- Topo map: OS Landranger 50, 56

Meall Mor (747 m) is a mountain in the Grampian Mountains of Scotland. It lies in the Stirling region, on the northern side of Loch Katrine in the Trossachs.

A rough wedge-like peak, the nearest village is Balquhidder to the northeast.
