= Beinn na Caillich (Kyle Rhea) =

Mountain at the eastern end of the Isle of Skye, in Scotland

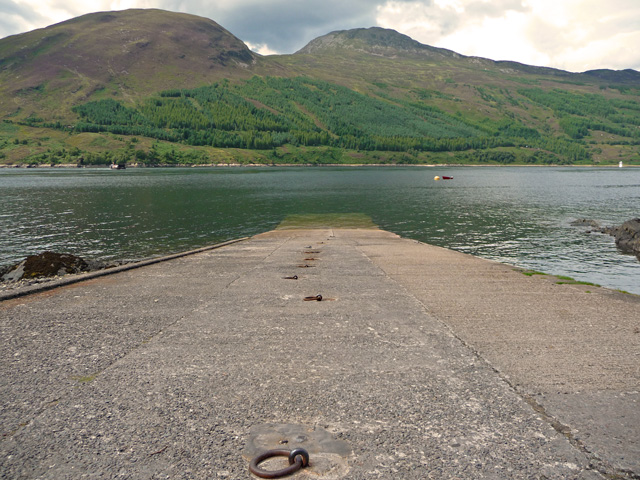
- View of Beinn na Caillich (right) from the ferry slipway near Glenelg, 2008

Highest point
- Elevation: 732 m (2,402 ft)
- Prominence: 154 m (505 ft)
- Listing: Marilyn, Graham
- Coordinates: 57°14′34″N 5°41′48″W

Naming
- English translation: mountain of the old woman
- Language of name: Gaelic

Geography
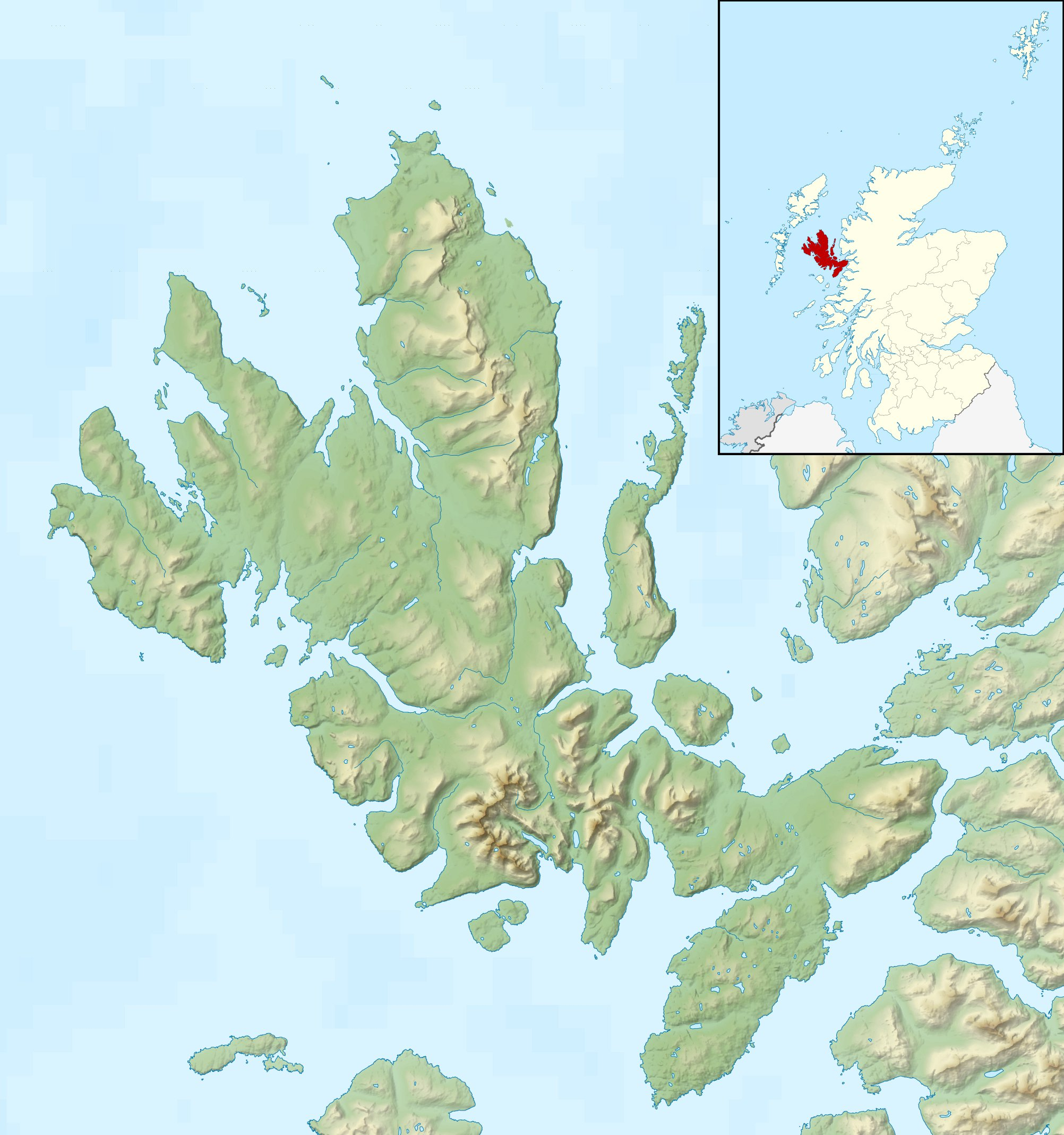
- Location within Isle of Skye
- Location: Isle of Skye, Scotland
- OS grid: NG770230
- Topo map: OS Landranger 33, Explorer 412/413

Beinn na Caillich (Scottish Gaelic for 'mountain of the old woman or Cailleach') is a mountain with a height of 732 metres (2,402 ft), overlooking Kyle Rhea at the eastern end of the Isle of Skye, Scotland. It is often climbed along with its slightly higher south-western neighbour, Sgurr na Coinnich. There is another Beinn na Caillich in the Red Hills on Skye, with an identical height.
