= Cruach Mhor (Argyll and Bute) =

Mountain in Scotland

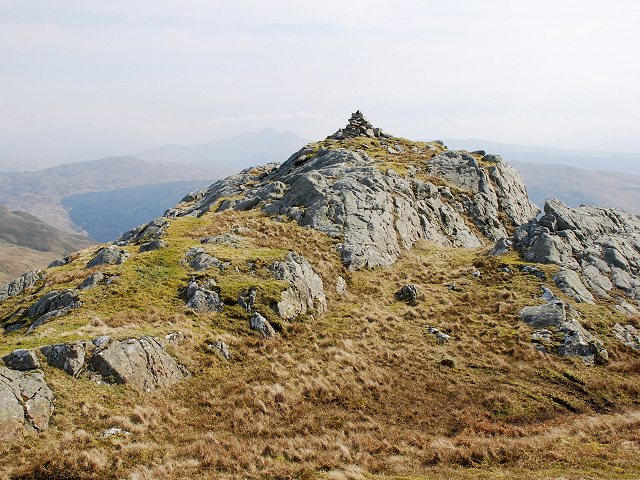
- Summit of Cruach Mhor

Highest point
- Elevation: 589 m (1,932 ft)
- Prominence: 383 m (1,257 ft)
- Listing: Marilyn
- Coordinates: 56.285910°N 5.141340°W

Geography
- Location: Argyll and Bute, Scotland
- OS grid: NN255084

Cruach Mhor is a 589 metres (1,932 ft) mountain in Argyll and Bute in Scotland.
