= List of Munro mountains =

Scottish mountains over 3,000 ft on the official list of Munros

Munros and Munro Tops
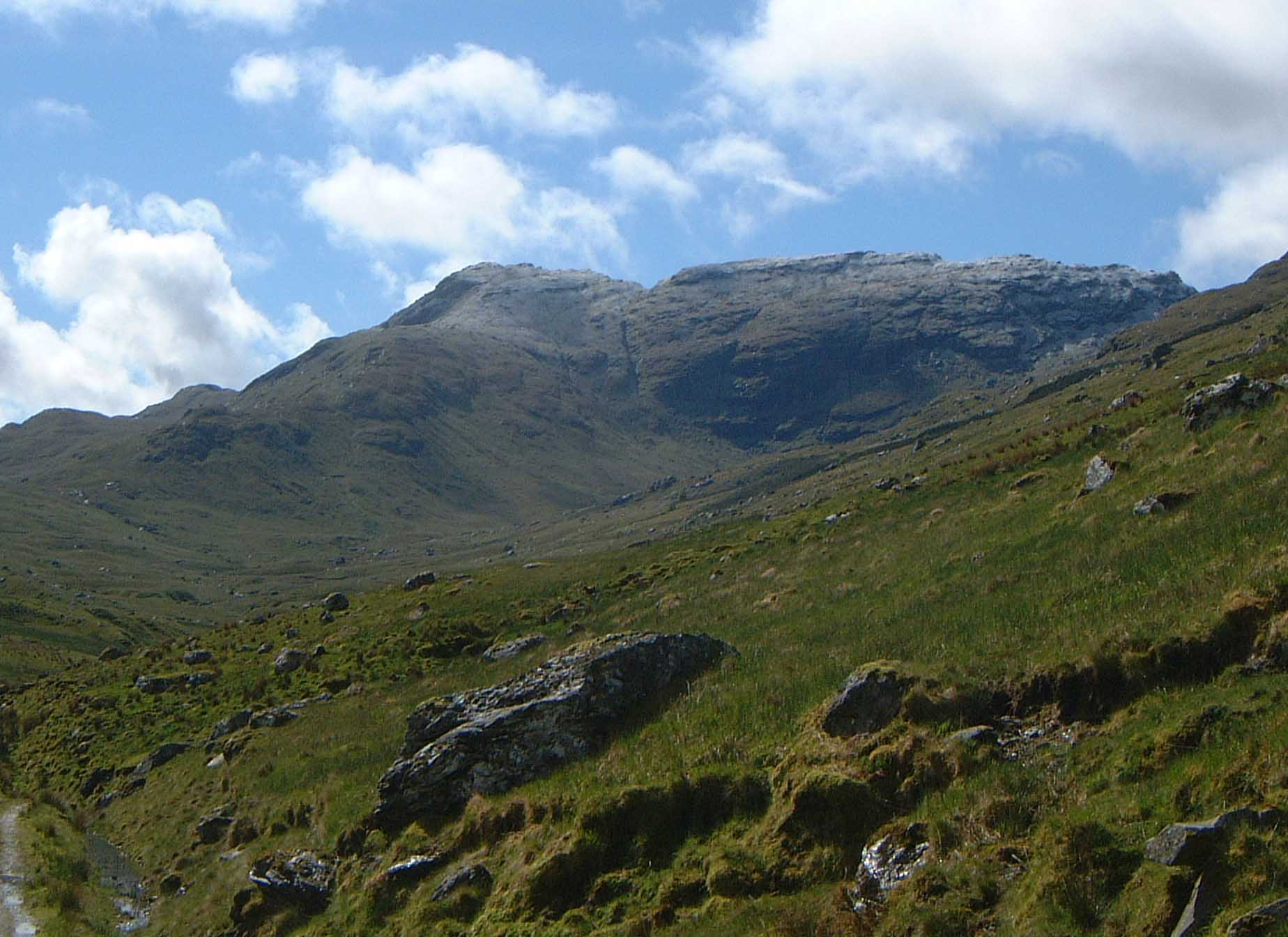
- Beinn a' Chroin in Crianlarich is the youngest Munro. Its classification was changed by the SMC from a Munro Top to a Munro in 1997.

Highest point
- Elevation: over 3,000 ft (914.4 m)
- Prominence: no requirement (Note: While the SMC does not use a prominence criterion for classifying a Munro, all but one of the 282 Munros below have a prominence above 30 metres (98 feet), the exception being Maoile Lunndaidh at 11 metres (36 feet); and apart from Am Basteir, all Munros have a prominence above 50 metres (160 feet).)

Geography
- Location: 282 Scottish Munros; 226 Scottish Munro Tops

This is a list of Munro mountains and Munro Tops in Scotland by height. Munros are defined as Scottish mountains over 3,000 feet (914.4 m) in height, and which are on the Scottish Mountaineering Club ("SMC") official list of Munros. (Note: For Munros, the Scottish Mountaineering Club use a quantitative height threshold of 3,000 feet (914.4 m), but a qualitative requirement of "sufficient separation", instead of prominence.) In addition, the SMC define Munro Tops, as Scottish peaks above 3,000 feet (914.4 m) that are not considered Munros. Where the SMC lists a Munro Top, due to "insufficient separation", it will also list the "Parent Peak", a Munro, of the Munro Top. (Note: In the DoBIH, this is the "Parent (SMC)" code, which the DoBIH define as follows: "The hill number and name of the Munro or Donald to which Munro Tops and Donald Tops are linked. For Munro Tops the hierarchy is shown in Munro's Tables. For a few tops the parent is topographically incorrect on current mapping (i.e. not the hill linked by the highest col), e.g. the SMC parent of 527 Càrn Lochan is Cairn Gorm rather than Ben Macdui, the parent of 1015 Stob Cadha Gobhlach is Sgurr Fiona instead of Bidein a' Ghlas Thuill, and the parent of 811 Ciste Dhubh is Mam Sodhail not Carn Eighe.") As of 6 September 2012, there were 282 Scottish Munros after the SMC confirmed that Beinn a' Chlaidheimh had been downgraded to a Corbett and as of 10 December 2020, there were 226 Scottish Munro Tops after Stob Coire na Cloiche, a Munro Top to Parent Peak Sgùrr nan Ceathramhnan, was surveyed at 912.5m and was deleted as a Munro Top and downgraded to a Corbett Top. The current SMC list totals 508 summits.

While the SMC does not use a prominence metric for classifying Munros, all but one of the 282 Munros have a prominence above 30 metres (98 ft), the exception being Maoile Lunndaidh at 11 metres (36 ft); (Note: 281 of the 282 Scottish Munros have an official OSI prominence above 30 m, except Maoile Lunndaidh, who was found in a 2014 survey to be lower than nearby Creag Toll a' Choin. Thus, Maoile Lunndaidh had its prominence reduced from 400 m to just under 11 m, and the 400 m of prominence given to Creag Toll a' Choin. Note that Creag Toll a' Choin had previously been a Munro until later mapping favoured Maoile Lunndaidh. Munro Tops are summits that are over 3,000ft, but considered to be a subsidiary top of a nearby Munro. There are currently 227 Munro Tops. The Murdos, a list created by Alan Dawson to bring objectivity to the classification of subsidiary summits of Munros, are Scottish hills over 3,000ft with a minimum drop of 30 metres on all sides. All Munros are Murdos, but not all Munro Tops are Murdos. There are 442 Murdos.) and apart from Am Basteir, all other Munros have a prominence above 50 metres (164.0 ft). In contrast, 69 Munro Tops have a prominence below 30 metres (98 ft), however, 14 Munro Tops have a prominence above 100 metres (328 ft), and the most prominent, Stob na Doire, is 144 metres (472 ft). The Munro Top, Càrn na Criche, would rank as the 5th largest Munro, if judged only on height.

Some authors have attempted to redefine Munros based on objective metric criteria. As of 6 September 2012, 202 of the 282 Munros had a prominence above 150 metres (492 ft). Such hills have been called Real Munros or Marilyn Munros. No Munro Top had a prominence above 150 metres (492 ft) (i.e. no Munro Top was a Marilyn). 130 Munros had a height above 1,000 metres (3,281 ft) and a prominence above 100 metres (328 ft), while 88 had a prominence above 200 metres (656 ft). Both categories have been called Metric Munros.

The list of Munros dates from 1891, and 255 of the 282 Munros below, were on the original 1891 list; while 28 of the 226 Munro Tops, were once Munros. Climbers who complete all Munros in the prevailing Munro's Tables are called Munroists, and the first Munroist was A. E. Robertson in 1901; his is recorded as Munroist Number 1 on the official SMC list, which by 31 December 2023, numbered 7,654 names. Munroists are eligible to join the Munro Society.

== Munro mountains by height ==
This list was downloaded from the Database of British and Irish Hills ("DoBIH") on 16 October 2026, and are peaks the DoBIH marks as being Munros ("M"). (Note: The Database of British and Irish Hills ("DoBIH") is the most referenced database for the classification of peaks in the British Isles, and the DoBIH is licensed under a "Creative Commons Attribution 3.0 Unported License".) The SMC updates its list of official Munros from time to time, and the DoBIH also updates its measurements as new surveys are recorded, so these tables should not be amended or updated unless the entire DoBIH data is re-downloaded.

Previously classed as a Corbett ("xC" § DoBIH codes).

Scottish Mountaineering Club ("SMC") Munros, ranked by height (DoBIH, 16 October 2026)
Height Rank	Prom. Rank	Name	Munro Since	Section / Region	Council area	Height (m)	Prom. (m)	Height (ft)	Prom. (ft)	Topo Map	OS Grid Reference	Classification (§ DoBIH codes)
1	1	Ben Nevis (Beinn Nibheis)	1891	04A: Fort William to Loch Treig & Loch Leven	Highland	1,344.527	1,344.527	4,411.18	4,411.18	41	NN166712	Ma,M,Sim,CoH,CoU,CoA,SIB
2	7	Ben Macdui (Beinn Macduibh)	1891	08A: Cairngorms	Aberdeenshire/ Moray	1,309.3	950	4,296	3,117	36 43	NN988989	Ma,M,Sim,CoH,CoU,CoA
3	80	Braeriach (Am Bràigh Riabhach)	1891	08A: Cairngorms	Aberdeenshire/ Highland	1,295.5	461	4,250	1,512	36 43	NN953999	Ma,M,Sim
4	189	Cairn Toul (Càrn an t-Sabhail)	1891	08A: Cairngorms	Aberdeenshire	1,292.4	167	4,240	548	36 43	NN963972	Ma,M,Sim
5	239	Sgor an Lochain Uaine	1891	08A: Cairngorms	Aberdeenshire	1,258	116.7	4,127	383	36 43	NN954976	Hu,M,Sim
6	206	Cairn Gorm (An Càrn Gorm)	1891	08A: Cairngorms	Highland/ Moray	1,244.8	145.8	4,084	478	36	NJ005040	Hu,M,Sim,sMa
7	95	Aonach Beag	1891	04A: Fort William to Loch Treig & Loch Leven	Highland	1,234.2	404	4,049	1,325	41	NN197715	Ma,M,Sim
8	194	Càrn Mòr Dearg	1891	04A: Fort William to Loch Treig & Loch Leven	Highland	1,221.1	164.1	4,006	538	41	NN177721	Ma,M,Sim
9	221	Aonach Mòr	1891	04A: Fort William to Loch Treig & Loch Leven	Highland	1,220.4	133	4,004	436	41	NN193729	Hu,M,Sim
10	8	Ben Lawers (Beinn Labhair)	1891	02B: Glen Lyon to Glen Dochart & Loch Tay	Perth and Kinross	1,214.3	914	3,984	2,999	51	NN635414	Ma,M,Sim,CoH,CoU,CoA
11	81	Beinn a' Bhùird	1891	08B: Cairngorms	Aberdeenshire/ Moray	1,196	456.2	3,924	1,497	36	NJ092006	Ma,M,Sim
12	135	Beinn Mheadhoin	1891	08A: Cairngorms	Moray	1,182.9	254	3,881	833	36	NJ024016	Ma,M,Sim
13	2	Càrn Eige	1891	11A: Loch Duich to Cannich	Highland	1,182.8	1,147	3,881	3,763	25	NH123261	Ma,M,Sim,CoH
14	223	Mam Sodhail	1891	11A: Loch Duich to Cannich	Highland	1,179.4	132.4	3,869	434	25	NH120253	Hu,M,Sim
15	85	Stob Choire Claurigh (Stob Choire Clamhraidh)	1891	04A: Fort William to Loch Treig & Loch Leven	Highland	1,178.3	447	3,866	1,467	41	NN261738	Ma,M,Sim
16	4	Ben More (A' Bheinn Mhòr)	1891	01C: Loch Lomond to Strathyre	Stirling	1,173.9	986	3,851	3,235	51	NN432244	Ma,M,Sim,CoU,CoA
17	163	Ben Avon (Beinn Athfhinn)	1891	08B: Cairngorms	Aberdeenshire/ Moray	1,172	198	3,845	650	36	NJ131018	Ma,M,Sim
18	120	Stob Binnein	1891	01C: Loch Lomond to Strathyre	Stirling	1,164.8	303.4	3,822	995	51	NN434227	Ma,M,Sim
19	132	Beinn Bhrotain	1891	08A: Cairngorms	Aberdeenshire	1,157	258	3,796	846	43	NN954922	Ma,M,Sim
20	208	Derry Cairngorm (Càrn Gorm an Doire)	1891	08A: Cairngorms	Aberdeenshire	1,155.8	142	3,792	466	36 43	NO017980	Hu,M,Sim,sMa
21	38	Lochnagar (Beinn Chìochan)	1891	07A: Braemar to Montrose	Aberdeenshire	1,155.7	671	3,792	2,201	44	NO243861	Ma,M,Sim
22	15	Sgurr na Lapaich	1891	12B: Killilan to Inverness	Highland	1,151.9	841	3,779	2,759	25	NH161351	Ma,M,Sim
23	88	Sgurr nan Ceathreamhnan	1891	11A: Loch Duich to Cannich	Highland	1,149.7	433	3,772	1,421	25 33	NH057228	Ma,M,Sim
24	14	Bidean nam Bian	1891	03B: Loch Linnhe to Loch Etive	Highland	1,149.4	844	3,771	2,769	41	NN143542	Ma,M,Sim,CoH
25	27	Ben Alder (Beinn Eallair)	1891	04B: Loch Treig to Loch Ericht	Highland	1,148	783	3,766	2,569	42	NN496718	Ma,M,Sim
26	11	Ben Lui (Beinn Laoigh)	1891	01D: Inveraray to Crianlarich	Stirling	1,131.4	876	3,712	2,871	50	NN266262	Ma,M,Sim
27	92	Geal-Chàrn	1891	04B: Loch Treig to Loch Ericht	Highland	1,131.4	409	3,712	1,342	42	NN469746	Ma,M,Sim
28	30	Binnein Mòr	1891	04A: Fort William to Loch Treig & Loch Leven	Highland	1,129.4	758	3,705	2,487	41	NN212663	Ma,M,Sim
29	12	Creag Meagaidh	1891	09C: Loch Lochy to Loch Laggan	Highland	1,128.1	867	3,701	2,844	34 42	NN418875	Ma,M,Sim
30	121	An Riabhachan	1891	12B: Killilan to Inverness	Highland	1,127.7	301.8	3,700	990	25	NH133344	Ma,M,Sim
31	10	Ben Cruachan	1891	03C: Glen Etive to Glen Lochy	Argyll and Bute	1,127	880	3,698	2,887	50	NN069304	Ma,M,Sim,CoU,CoA
32	164	Meall Garbh	1891	02B: Glen Lyon to Glen Dochart & Loch Tay	Perth and Kinross	1,123.1	198	3,685	650	51	NN644437	Ma,M,Sim
33	41	Beinn a' Ghló - Càrn nan Gabhar	1891	06B: Pitlochry to Braemar & Blairgowrie	Perth and Kinross	1,121.9	658	3,681	2,159	43	NN971733	Ma,M,Sim
34	26	A' Chraileag (A' Chràlaig)	1891	11B: Glen Affric to Glen Moriston	Highland	1,119.2	785	3,672	2,575	33	NH094147	Ma,M,Sim
35	229	An Stuc	1997	02B: Glen Lyon to Glen Dochart & Loch Tay	Perth and Kinross	1,117.1	126	3,665	413	51	NN638431	Hu,M,Sim
36	270	Stob Coire an Laoigh	1891	04A: Fort William to Loch Treig & Loch Leven	Highland	1,116.7	74.3	3,664	244	41	NN239725	M,Sim
37	53	Stob Coire Easain	1891	04A: Fort William to Loch Treig & Loch Leven	Highland	1,116.2	612	3,662	2,008	41	NN308730	Ma,M,Sim
38	144	Sgor Gaoith	1891	08A: Cairngorms	Highland	1,116	242.8	3,661	797	36 43	NN903989	Ma,M,Sim
39	257	Aonach Beag	1891	04B: Loch Treig to Loch Ericht	Highland	1,115.8	99	3,661	325	42	NN457741	M,Sim,sHu
40	212	Monadh Mòr	1891	08A: Cairngorms	Aberdeenshire/ Highland	1,113.4	138.8	3,653	455	36 43	NN938942	Hu,M,Sim
41	203	Tom a' Choinich	1891	11A: Loch Duich to Cannich	Highland	1,112.7	149.8	3,651	491	25	NH164273	Hu,M,Sim,sMa
42	272	Càrn a' Choire Bhoidheach	1891	07A: Braemar to Montrose	Aberdeenshire	1,109.9	72.9	3,641	239	44	NO226845	M,Sim
43	100	Sgurr nan Conbhairean	1891	11B: Glen Affric to Glen Moriston	Highland	1,109	382	3,638	1,253	34	NH129138	Ma,M,Sim
44	9	Sgurr Mòr	1891	14B: The Fannaichs	Highland	1,108.9	914	3,638	2,999	20	NH203718	Ma,M,Sim
45	24	Meall a' Bhuiridh	1891	03C: Glen Etive to Glen Lochy	Highland	1,107.9	795	3,635	2,608	41	NN250503	Ma,M,Sim
46	210	Stob a' Choire Mheadhoin	1891	04A: Fort William to Loch Treig & Loch Leven	Highland	1,106.6	144.1	3,631	473	41	NN316736	Hu,M,Sim,sMa
47	246	Beinn Ghlas	1891	02B: Glen Lyon to Glen Dochart & Loch Tay	Perth and Kinross	1,103.4	109.1	3,620	358	51	NN625404	Hu,M,Sim
48	227	Beinn Eibhinn	1891	04B: Loch Treig to Loch Ericht	Highland	1,103.3	127	3,620	417	42	NN449733	Hu,M,Sim
49	201	Mullach Fraoch-choire	1891	11B: Glen Affric to Glen Moriston	Highland	1,100.9	151.3	3,612	496	33	NH094171	Ma,M,Sim
50	188	Creise	1981	03C: Glen Etive to Glen Lochy	Highland	1,099.8	169.4	3,608	556	41	NN238506	Ma,M,Sim
51	111	Sgurr a' Mhaim	1891	04A: Fort William to Loch Treig & Loch Leven	Highland	1,099	316	3,606	1,037	41	NN164667	Ma,M,Sim
52	195	Sgurr Choinnich Mòr	1891	04A: Fort William to Loch Treig & Loch Leven	Highland	1,094.6	160	3,591	525	41	NN227714	Ma,M,Sim
53	149	Sgurr nan Clach Geala	1891	14B: The Fannaichs	Highland	1,093.4	229	3,587	751	20	NH184714	Ma,M,Sim
54	127	Bynack More	1891	08A: Cairngorms	Highland	1,090.4	283.4	3,577	930	36	NJ041063	Ma,M,Sim
55	97	Stob Ghabhar	1891	03C: Glen Etive to Glen Lochy	Argyll and Bute/ Highland	1,089.2	392	3,573	1,286	50	NN230455	Ma,M,Sim
56	65	Beinn a' Chlachair	1891	04B: Loch Treig to Loch Ericht	Highland	1,087.8	540	3,569	1,772	42	NN471781	Ma,M,Sim
57	23	Beinn Dearg	1891	15A: Loch Broom to Strath Oykel	Highland	1,084	810	3,556	2,657	20	NH259811	Ma,M,Sim
58	21	Sgurr a' Choire Ghlais	1891	12A: Kyle of Lochalsh to Garve	Highland	1,083.7	819	3,555	2,687	25	NH258430	Ma,M,Sim
59	34	Schiehallion (Sìdh Chailleann)	1891	02A: Loch Rannoch to Glen Lyon	Perth and Kinross	1,083.3	713	3,554	2,339	42 51 52	NN713547	Ma,M,Sim
60	141	Beinn a' Chaorainn	1891	08B: Cairngorms	Aberdeenshire/ Moray	1,083.3	246.3	3,554	808	36	NJ045013	Ma,M,Sim
61	43	Beinn a' Chreachain	1891	02A: Loch Rannoch to Glen Lyon	Perth and Kinross	1,080.6	650	3,545	2,133	50	NN373440	Ma,M,Sim
62	84	Ben Starav	1891	03C: Glen Etive to Glen Lochy	Highland	1,079.5	448.8	3,542	1,472	50	NN125427	Ma,M,Sim
63	59	Beinn Heasgarnich	1891	02B: Glen Lyon to Glen Dochart & Loch Tay	Perth and Kinross	1,077.4	579	3,535	1,900	51	NN413383	Ma,M,Sim
64	106	Beinn Dorain	1891	02A: Loch Rannoch to Glen Lyon	Argyll and Bute	1,076	332	3,530	1,089	50	NN325378	Ma,M,Sim
65	225	Bidean nam Bian - Stob Coire Sgreamhach	1997	03B: Loch Linnhe to Loch Etive	Highland	1,071.6	128	3,516	420	41	NN154536	Hu,M,Sim
66	153	Beinn a' Ghlò - Bràigh Coire Chruinn-bhalgain	1891	06B: Pitlochry to Braemar & Blairgowrie	Perth and Kinross	1,070	222.4	3,510	730	43	NN945724	Ma,M,Sim
67	157	An Socach	1891	12B: Killilan to Inverness	Highland	1,069.6	207.4	3,509	680	25	NH100332	Ma,M,Sim
68	39	Sgurr Fhuaran	1891	11A: Loch Duich to Cannich	Highland	1,068.7	665	3,506	2,181	33	NG978166	Ma,M,Sim
69	168	Glas Maol	1891	07A: Braemar to Montrose	Angus	1,067.7	195.2	3,503	640	43	NO166765	Ma,M,Sim,CoH,CoU
70	161	Meall Corranaich	1891	02B: Glen Lyon to Glen Dochart & Loch Tay	Perth and Kinross	1,067.2	201.3	3,501	660	51	NN615410	Ma,M,Sim
71	238	Cairn of Claise	1891	07A: Braemar to Montrose	Aberdeenshire/Angus	1,063.1	118.9	3,488	390	43	NO185788	Hu,M,Sim
72	31	An Teallach - Bidein a' Ghlas Thuill	1891	14A: Loch Maree to Loch Broom	Highland	1,062.6	757	3,486	2,484	19	NH068843	Ma,M,Sim
73	209	An Teallach - Sgurr Fiona	1981	14A: Loch Maree to Loch Broom	Highland	1,058.7	141.7	3,473	465	19	NH064836	Hu,M,Sim,sMa
74	6	Liathach - Spidean a' Choire Leith	1891	13A: Loch Torridon to Loch Maree	Highland	1,054.8	957	3,461	3,140	25	NG929579	Ma,M,Sim
75	258	Na Gruagaichean	1891	04A: Fort William to Loch Treig & Loch Leven	Highland	1,054.2	96.9	3,459	317	41	NN203652	M,Sim,sHu
76	177	Toll Creagach	1891	11A: Loch Duich to Cannich	Highland	1,053.7	181.4	3,457	595	25	NH194282	Ma,M,Sim
77	60	Sgùrr a' Chaorachain	1891	12A: Kyle of Lochalsh to Garve	Highland	1,053	568	3,455	1,864	25	NH087447	Ma,M,Sim
78	249	Stob Poite Coire Ardair	1891	09C: Loch Lochy to Loch Laggan	Highland	1,052.5	107	3,453	351	34 42	NN428888	Hu,M,Sim
79	99	Glas Tulaichean	1891	06B: Pitlochry to Braemar & Blairgowrie	Perth and Kinross	1,051	383	3,448	1,260	43	NO051760	Ma,M,Sim
80	116	Geal Charn	1891	04B: Loch Treig to Loch Ericht	Highland	1,049.7	311	3,444	1,020	42	NN504811	Ma,M,Sim
81	205	Sgurr Fhuar-thuill	1891	12A: Kyle of Lochalsh to Garve	Highland	1,049.2	148.1	3,442	485	25	NH235437	Hu,M,Sim,sMa
82	150	Beinn a' Chaorainn	1974	09C: Loch Lochy to Loch Laggan	Highland	1,049.1	227	3,442	755	34 41	NN386850	Ma,M,Sim
83	46	Chno Dearg	1891	04B: Loch Treig to Loch Ericht	Highland	1,047.5	646	3,437	2,119	41	NN377741	Ma,M,Sim
84	266	Càrn an t-Sagairt Mòr	1891	07A: Braemar to Montrose	Aberdeenshire	1,047	85	3,435	279	44	NO208842	M,Sim
85	96	Creag Mhòr	1891	02B: Glen Lyon to Glen Dochart & Loch Tay	Perth and Kinross/ Stirling	1,046.8	394	3,434	1,289	50	NN391361	Ma,M,Sim
86	37	Ben Wyvis	1891	15B: Loch Vaich to Moray Firth	Highland	1,046	691	3,432	2,267	20	NH462683	Ma,M,Sim
87	64	Cruach Ardrain	1891	01C: Loch Lomond to Strathyre	Stirling	1,045.9	549	3,431	1,801	51 56	NN409212	Ma,M,Sim
88	139	Beinn Iutharn Mhòr	1891	06B: Pitlochry to Braemar & Blairgowrie	Aberdeenshire/ Perth and Kinross	1,045	247	3,428	810	43	NO045792	Ma,M,Sim
89	118	Stob Coir'an Albannaich	1891	03C: Glen Etive to Glen Lochy	Argyll and Bute/ Highland	1,044.9	307	3,428	1,007	50	NN169443	Ma,M,Sim
90	71	Meall nan Tarmachan	1891	02B: Glen Lyon to Glen Dochart & Loch Tay	Perth and Kinross	1,043.6	494.4	3,424	1,622	51	NN585389	Ma,M,Sim
91	78	Càrn Mairg	1891	02A: Loch Rannoch to Glen Lyon	Perth and Kinross	1,043	466.9	3,422	1,532	42 51	NN684512	Ma,M,Sim
92	16	Sgùrr na Cìche	1891	10B: Knoydart to Glen Kingie	Highland	1,040.2	839	3,413	2,753	33 40	NM902966	Ma,M,Sim
93	72	Meall Ghaordaidh	1891	02B: Glen Lyon to Glen Dochart & Loch Tay	Perth and Kinross/ Stirling	1,039.8	492	3,411	1,614	51	NN514397	Ma,M,Sim
94	112	Sgurr a' Bhealaich Dheirg	1891	11A: Loch Duich to Cannich	Highland	1,039.1	315.6	3,409	1,035	33	NH035143	Ma,M,Sim
95	146	Càrn a' Mhaim	1891	08A: Cairngorms	Aberdeenshire	1,039.1	233	3,409	764	36 43	NN994951	Ma,M,Sim
96	151	Beinn Achaladair	1891	02A: Loch Rannoch to Glen Lyon	Argyll and Bute/ Perth and Kinross	1,038.6	226	3,407	741	50	NN344432	Ma,M,Sim
97	29	Gleouraich	1891	10A: Glen Shiel to Loch Hourn and Loch Quoich	Highland	1,035.1	767.7	3,396	2,519	33	NH039053	Ma,M,Sim
98	196	Càrn Dearg	1891	04B: Loch Treig to Loch Ericht	Highland	1,034.1	158.1	3,393	519	42	NN504764	Ma,M,Sim
99	44	Beinn Fhada (Ben Attow)	1891	11A: Loch Duich to Cannich	Highland	1,031.9	647	3,385	2,123	33	NH018192	Ma,M,Sim
100	198	Am Bodach	1891	04A: Fort William to Loch Treig & Loch Leven	Highland	1,031.8	152.8	3,385	501	41	NN176650	Ma,M,Sim
101	103	Ben Oss	1891	01D: Inveraray to Crianlarich	Stirling	1,029.8	341.2	3,379	1,119	50	NN287253	Ma,M,Sim
102	170	Càrn Gorm	1891	02A: Loch Rannoch to Glen Lyon	Perth and Kinross	1,029.5	188.5	3,378	618	42 51	NN635500	Ma,M,Sim
103	133	Càrn an Rìgh	1891	06B: Pitlochry to Braemar & Blairgowrie	Perth and Kinross	1,029	258	3,376	846	43	NO028772	Ma,M,Sim
104	178	Sgurr na Ciste Duibhe	1891	11A: Loch Duich to Cannich	Highland	1,027	178	3,369	584	33	NG984149	Ma,M,Sim
105	36	Sgurr a' Mhaoraich	1891	10A: Glen Shiel to Loch Hourn and Loch Quoich	Highland	1,026.6	708	3,368	2,323	33	NG984065	Ma,M,Sim
106	83	Beinn Challuim (Ben Challum)	1891	02B: Glen Lyon to Glen Dochart & Loch Tay	Stirling	1,024.9	450	3,363	1,476	50	NN386322	Ma,M,Sim
107	32	Beinn a' Bheithir - Sgorr Dhearg	1891	03B: Loch Linnhe to Loch Etive	Highland	1,024.2	729	3,360	2,392	41	NN056558	Ma,M,Sim
108	199	Liathach - Mullach an Rathain	1981	13A: Loch Torridon to Loch Maree	Highland	1,023.9	152.1	3,359	499	25	NG911576	Ma,M,Sim
109	66	Buachaille Etive Mòr - Stob Dearg (Buachaille Èite Mòr)	1891	03B: Loch Linnhe to Loch Etive	Highland	1,021.4	532	3,351	1,745	41	NN222542	Ma,M,Sim
110	25	Ladhar Bheinn	1891	10B: Knoydart to Glen Kingie	Highland	1,019.4	794	3,344	2,605	33	NG824039	Ma,M,Sim
111	73	Aonach air Chrith	1891	10A: Glen Shiel to Loch Hourn and Loch Quoich	Highland	1,019.4	492	3,344	1,614	33	NH051083	Ma,M,Sim
112	174	Beinn Bheoil	1891	04B: Loch Treig to Loch Ericht	Highland	1,019	186	3,343	610	42	NN517717	Ma,M,Sim
113	251	Mullach Clach a' Bhlair	1891	08A: Cairngorms	Highland	1,019	104.9	3,343	344	35 43	NN882927	Hu,M,Sim
114	279	Càrn an Tuirc	1891	07A: Braemar to Montrose	Aberdeenshire	1,018.8	61.6	3,343	202	43	NO174804	M,Sim
115	57	Mullach Coire Mhic Fhearchair	1891	14A: Loch Maree to Loch Broom	Highland	1,015.2	591	3,331	1,939	19	NH052735	Ma,M,Sim
116	187	Garbh Chioch Mhòr	1981	10B: Knoydart to Glen Kingie	Highland	1,012.9	169.5	3,323	556	33 40	NM909961	Ma,M,Sim
117	35	Beinn Ìme	1891	01D: Inveraray to Crianlarich	Argyll and Bute	1,012.2	713	3,321	2,336	56	NN254084	Ma,M,Sim
118	105	The Saddle (An Dìollaid)	1891	10A: Glen Shiel to Loch Hourn and Loch Quoich	Highland	1,011.4	334	3,318	1,095	33	NG936131	Ma,M,Sim
119	269	Cairn Bannoch	1891	07A: Braemar to Montrose	Aberdeenshire/Angus	1,011.1	76	3,317	249	44	NO222825	M,Sim
120	61	Beinn Udlamain	1891	05A: Loch Ericht to Glen Tromie & Glen Garry	Highland/ Perth and Kinross	1,010.2	555	3,314	1,821	42	NN579739	Ma,M,Sim
121	47	Beinn Eighe - Ruadh-stac Mòr	1891	13A: Loch Torridon to Loch Maree	Highland	1,010	632	3,314	2,073	19	NG951611	Ma,M,Sim
122	76	Beinn Dearg	1891	06A: Glen Tromie to Glen Tilt	Perth and Kinross	1,008.7	473	3,309	1,552	43	NN852778	Ma,M,Sim
123	169	Sgurr an Doire Leathain	1891	10A: Glen Shiel to Loch Hourn and Loch Quoich	Highland	1,008.4	187.3	3,308	615	33	NH015098	Ma,M,Sim
124	129	Sgurr Eilde Mòr	1891	04A: Fort William to Loch Treig & Loch Leven	Highland	1,008.1	269.2	3,307	883	41	NN230657	Ma,M,Sim
125	261	The Devil's Point	1891	08A: Cairngorms	Aberdeenshire	1,006.9	90.6	3,303	297	36 43	NN976951	M,Sim
126	109	An Sgarsoch	1891	06A: Glen Tromie to Glen Tilt	Aberdeenshire/ Perth and Kinross	1,006.5	319	3,302	1,047	43	NN933836	Ma,M,Sim
127	265	Càrn Liath	1891	09C: Loch Lochy to Loch Laggan	Highland	1,006.1	86.9	3,301	285	34	NN472903	M,Sim
128	282	Maoile Lunndaidh	1891	12A: Kyle of Lochalsh to Garve	Highland	1,004.9	10.5	3,297	34	25	NH135458	M
129	183	Beinn Fhionnlaidh	1891	11A: Loch Duich to Cannich	Highland	1,004.7	173	3,296	567	25	NH115282	Ma,M,Sim
130	104	Sgurr Mor	1891	10B: Knoydart to Glen Kingie	Highland	1,003.7	342.4	3,293	1,123	33 40	NM965980	Ma,M,Sim
131	143	Beinn an Dothaidh	1891	02A: Loch Rannoch to Glen Lyon	Argyll and Bute	1,002.3	245	3,288	804	50	NN331408	Ma,M,Sim
132	142	Beinn a' Bheithir - Sgorr Dhonuill	1891	03B: Loch Linnhe to Loch Etive	Highland	1,002.1	245.1	3,288	801	41	NN040555	Ma,M,Sim
133	220	Sgurr na Carnach	1997	11A: Loch Duich to Cannich	Highland	1,002	134	3,287	440	33	NG977158	Hu,M,Sim
134	184	Aonach Meadhoin	1891	11A: Loch Duich to Cannich	Highland	1,001.9	172.6	3,287	566	33	NH048137	Ma,M,Sim
135	234	Sgurr an Lochain	1891	10A: Glen Shiel to Loch Hourn and Loch Quoich	Highland	1,001.7	120.9	3,286	397	33	NH005104	Hu,M,Sim
136	190	Meall Greigh	1891	02B: Glen Lyon to Glen Dochart & Loch Tay	Perth and Kinross	1,000.7	167	3,283	548	51	NN674438	Ma,M,Sim
137	145	Stob Bàn	1891	04A: Fort William to Loch Treig & Loch Leven	Highland	999.7	237.1	3,280	777	41	NN147654	Ma,M,Sim
138	82	Sgurr Breac	1891	14B: The Fannaichs	Highland	999.6	450.8	3,280	1,480	20	NH158711	Ma,M,Sim
139	222	Sgurr Choinnich	1891	12A: Kyle of Lochalsh to Garve	Highland	999.3	133	3,279	436	25	NH076446	Hu,M,Sim
140	218	Stob Daimh	1891	03C: Glen Etive to Glen Lochy	Argyll and Bute	999.2	134.5	3,278	441	50	NN094308	Hu,M,Sim
141	264	Sail Chaorainn	1891	11B: Glen Affric to Glen Moriston	Highland	999.2	87	3,278	285	34	NH133154	M,Sim
142	18	Ben More Assynt	1891	16E: Scourie to Lairg	Highland	998.9	836	3,277	2,743	15	NC318201	Ma,M,Sim,CoH
143	175	A' Chailleach	1891	14B: The Fannaichs	Highland	998.6	182.9	3,276	600	19	NH136714	Ma,M,Sim
144	148	Glas Bheinn Mhòr	1891	03C: Glen Etive to Glen Lochy	Argyll and Bute/ Highland	997.7	231.3	3,273	759	50	NN153429	Ma,M,Sim
145	277	Broad Cairn	1891	07A: Braemar to Montrose	Aberdeenshire/Angus	997.1	63.9	3,271	210	44	NO240815	M,Sim
146	75	An Caisteal	1891	01C: Loch Lomond to Strathyre	Stirling	995.9	474	3,267	1,555	50 56	NN378193	Ma,M,Sim
147	131	Spidean Mialach	1891	10A: Glen Shiel to Loch Hourn and Loch Quoich	Highland	995.9	259.5	3,267	851	33	NH065043	Ma,M,Sim
148	91	Sgurr na h-Ulaidh	1891	03B: Loch Linnhe to Loch Etive	Highland	994	415	3,261	1,362	41	NN111517	Ma,M,Sim
149	126	Carn an Fhidhleir	1891	06A: Glen Tromie to Glen Tilt	Aberdeenshire/ Highland/ Perth and Kinross	994	286	3,261	937	43	NN904841	Ma,M,Sim
150	152	Sgurr na Ruaidhe	1891	12A: Kyle of Lochalsh to Garve	Highland	993	226	3,258	741	25	NH289426	Ma,M,Sim
151	185	Beinn Eighe - Spidean Coire nan Clach	1997	13A: Loch Torridon to Loch Maree	Highland	993	172	3,258	564	25	NG966597	Ma,M,Sim
152	165	Càrn nan Gobhar (Mullardoch)	1891	12B: Killilan to Inverness	Highland	992.3	197.5	3,256	648	25	NH181343	Ma,M,Sim
153	3	Sgùrr Alasdair	1891	17B: Minginish and the Cuillin Hills	Highland	992	992	3,255	3,255	32	NG450207	Ma,M,Sim,SIB
154	214	Càrn nan Gobhar (Strathfarrar)	1891	12A: Kyle of Lochalsh to Garve	Highland	992	137	3,255	449	25	NH273438	Hu,M,Sim
155	176	Sgairneach Mhòr	1891	05A: Loch Ericht to Glen Tromie & Glen Garry	Perth and Kinross	991.4	181.7	3,253	596	42	NN598731	Ma,M,Sim
156	89	Beinn Eunaich	1891	03C: Glen Etive to Glen Lochy	Argyll and Bute	990.3	425.9	3,249	1,397	50	NN135327	Ma,M,Sim
157	192	Sgurr Bàn	1891	14A: Loch Maree to Loch Broom	Highland	989	165	3,245	541	19	NH055745	Ma,M,Sim
158	276	Creag Leacach	1891	07A: Braemar to Montrose	Angus/ Perth and Kinross	988.2	70.7	3,242	232	43	NO154745	M,Sim
159	254	Conival	1891	16E: Scourie to Lairg	Highland	987.6	102	3,240	335	15	NC303199	Hu,M,Sim
160	86	Lurg Mhòr	1891	12A: Kyle of Lochalsh to Garve	Highland	987.5	443	3,240	1,453	25	NH064404	Ma,M,Sim
161	54	Beinn Alligin - Sgùrr Mhòr (Beinn Àilleagan)	1891	13A: Loch Torridon to Loch Maree	Highland	986	601	3,235	1,972	19 24	NG865612	Ma,M,Sim
162	171	Sgùrr Dearg (Inaccessible Pinnacle)	1921	17B: Minginish and the Cuillin Hills	Highland	985.8	187.6	3,234	614	32	NG444215	Ma,M,Sim
163	19	Ben Vorlich	1891	01B: Strathyre to Strathallan	Perth and Kinross	985.3	834.3	3,233	2,736	57	NN629189	Ma,M,Sim
164	255	Druim Shionnach	1891	10A: Glen Shiel to Loch Hourn and Loch Quoich	Highland	985.2	101.3	3,232	332	33	NH074084	Hu,M,Sim
165	17	Gaor Bheinn (Gulvain)	1891	10D: Mallaig to Fort William	Highland	983.2	839	3,226	2,753	41	NN002875	Ma,M,Sim
166	217	Meall nan Aighean	1891	02A: Loch Rannoch to Glen Lyon	Perth and Kinross	982.1	136.3	3,222	447	51	NN694496	Hu,M,Sim
167	200	An Gearanach	1891	04A: Fort William to Loch Treig & Loch Leven	Highland	981.5	151.7	3,220	497	41	NN187669	Ma,M,Sim
168	137	Beinn a' Chochuill	1891	03C: Glen Etive to Glen Lochy	Argyll and Bute	981.3	251.8	3,219	826	50	NN109328	Ma,M,Sim
169	231	Stob Coire a' Chairn	1891	04A: Fort William to Loch Treig & Loch Leven	Highland	981.3	124.5	3,219	408	41	NN185660	Ma,Hu,M,Sim
170	49	Slioch	1953	14A: Loch Maree to Loch Broom	Highland	981.2	626	3,219	2,054	19	NH004690	Ma,M,Sim
171	98	Ciste Dhubh	1891	11A: Loch Duich to Cannich	Highland	981.1	390.5	3,219	1,273	33	NH062166	Ma,M,Sim
172	207	Mullach na Dheiragain	1933	11A: Loch Duich to Cannich	Highland	980.6	143	3,217	469	25 33	NH080259	Hu,M,Sim,sMa
173	213	Maol Chinn-dearg	1891	10A: Glen Shiel to Loch Hourn and Loch Quoich	Highland	980.3	137.6	3,216	451	33	NH032087	Hu,M,Sim
174	263	Stob Coire Sgriodain	1891	04B: Loch Treig to Loch Ericht	Highland	979.1	87.9	3,212	288	41	NN356743	M,Sim,sHu
175	162	Beinn Dubhchraig	1891	01D: Inveraray to Crianlarich	Stirling	978.6	198.9	3,211	653	50	NN307254	Ma,M,Sim
176	193	Cona' Mheall	1891	15A: Loch Broom to Strath Oykel	Highland	977.8	164.8	3,208	541	20	NH275816	Ma,M,Sim
177	182	Stob Bàn	1891	04A: Fort William to Loch Treig & Loch Leven	Highland	977	174	3,205	571	41	NN266723	Ma,M,Sim
178	228	Meall nan Ceapraichean	1891	15A: Loch Broom to Strath Oykel	Highland	976.8	126.6	3,205	415	20	NH257825	Hu,M,Sim
179	124	Càrn a' Gheoidh	1891	06B: Pitlochry to Braemar & Blairgowrie	Aberdeenshire/ Perth and Kinross	976.1	299	3,202	980	43	NO107767	Ma,M,Sim
180	158	Beinn a' Ghlò - Càrn Liath	1891	06B: Pitlochry to Braemar & Blairgowrie	Perth and Kinross	975.8	207.1	3,201	679	43	NN936698	Ma,M,Sim
181	69	Beinn Sgritheall	1891	10A: Glen Shiel to Loch Hourn and Loch Quoich	Highland	974	500	3,196	1,640	33	NG835126	Ma,M,Sim
182	20	Ben Lomond (Beinn Laomainn)	1891	01C: Loch Lomond to Strathyre	Stirling	973.7	820	3,195	2,690	56	NN367028	Ma,M,Sim,CoH
183	243	A' Mharconaich	1891	05A: Loch Ericht to Glen Tromie & Glen Garry	Highland	973.2	112	3,193	367	42	NN604762	Hu,M,Sim
184	136	Stuc a' Chroin	1891	01B: Strathyre to Strathallan	Perth and Kinross/ Stirling	973	252.1	3,192	827	57	NN617174	Ma,M,Sim
185	232	Sgurr a' Ghreadaidh	1891	17B: Minginish and the Cuillin Hills	Highland	972.1	124	3,189	407	32	NG445231	Hu,M,Sim
186	50	Aonach Eagach - Sgorr nam Fiannaidh	1891	03A: Loch Leven to Rannoch Station	Highland	967.7	623	3,175	2,044	41	NN140583	Ma,M,Sim
187	253	Meall Garbh	1891	02A: Loch Rannoch to Glen Lyon	Perth and Kinross	967.5	102.2	3,174	335	42 51	NN647516	Hu,M,Sim
188	160	Sgùrr nan Gillean	1891	17B: Minginish and the Cuillin Hills	Highland	966.1	205	3,170	666	32	NG471253	Ma,M,Sim
189	5	Ben More	1891	17E: Mull and Nearby Islands	Argyll and Bute	966	966	3,169	3,169	47 48	NM525330	Ma,M,Sim,SIB
190	87	A' Mhaighdean	1891	14A: Loch Maree to Loch Broom	Highland	965.8	443	3,169	1,453	19	NH007749	Ma,M,Sim
191	241	Sgurr na Banachdaich	1891	17B: Minginish and the Cuillin Hills	Highland	965.5	114	3,168	374	32	NG440224	Hu,M,Sim
192	110	Càrn a' Chlamain	1891	06A: Glen Tromie to Glen Tilt	Perth and Kinross	963.5	317	3,161	1,040	43	NN915758	Ma,M,Sim
193	52	Sgurr Thuilm	1891	10D: Mallaig to Fort William	Highland	963	614	3,159	2,014	40	NM939879	Ma,M,Sim
194	22	Ben Klibreck - Meall nan Con	1891	16D: Altnaharra to Dornoch	Highland	962.1	819	3,156	2,687	16	NC585299	Ma,M,Sim
195	33	Sgorr Ruadh	1891	13B: Applecross to Achnasheen	Highland	960.7	723	3,152	2,372	25	NG959505	Ma,M,Sim
196	74	Stuchd an Lochain	1891	02A: Loch Rannoch to Glen Lyon	Perth and Kinross	959.5	481	3,148	1,578	51	NN483448	Ma,M,Sim
197	68	Beinn Fhionnlaidh	1891	03B: Loch Linnhe to Loch Etive	Argyll and Bute	959.4	510	3,148	1,673	50	NN095497	Ma,M,Sim
198	62	Meall Glas	1921	02B: Glen Lyon to Glen Dochart & Loch Tay	Stirling	959.3	554	3,147	1,818	51	NN431321	Ma,M,Sim
199	102	Beinn nan Aighenan	1891	03C: Glen Etive to Glen Lochy	Argyll and Bute	959	343.4	3,146	1,125	50	NN148405	Ma,M,Sim
200	230	Bruach na Frithe	1891	17B: Minginish and the Cuillin Hills	Highland	958.8	126	3,146	413	32	NG460252	Hu,M,Sim
201	259	Saileag	1891	11A: Loch Duich to Cannich	Highland	958.2	92.7	3,144	304	33	NH017148	M,Sim,sHu
202	271	Tolmount	1891	07A: Braemar to Montrose	Aberdeenshire/Angus	957.8	73.7	3,142	242	44	NO210800	M,Sim
203	274	Tom Buidhe	1891	07A: Braemar to Montrose	Angus	957.8	72.6	3,142	238	44	NO213787	M,Sim
204	77	Buachaille Etive Beag - Stob Dubh (Buachaille Èite Beag)	1891	03B: Loch Linnhe to Loch Etive	Highland	956.7	468	3,139	1,535	41	NN179535	Ma,M,Sim
205	147	Sgurr nan Coireachan	1891	10D: Mallaig to Fort William	Highland	956.3	231.8	3,137	760	40	NM902880	Ma,M,Sim
206	278	Càrn Ghluasaid	1891	11B: Glen Affric to Glen Moriston	Highland	956.3	62.7	3,137	206	34	NH145125	M,Sim
207	123	Sgor Gaibhre	1891	04B: Loch Treig to Loch Ericht	Highland/ Perth and Kinross	954.7	300	3,132	984	42	NN444674	Ma,M,Sim
208	250	Beinn Liath Mhòr Fannaich	1891	14B: The Fannaichs	Highland	954.2	107	3,131	351	20	NH219724	Hu,M,Sim
209	154	Sgurr nan Coireachan	1891	10B: Knoydart to Glen Kingie	Highland	953.8	221.7	3,129	727	33 40	NM933958	Ma,M,Sim
210	219	Buachaille Etive Mòr - Stob na Bròige (Buachaille Èite Mòr)	1997	03B: Loch Linnhe to Loch Etive	Highland	953.4	134.5	3,128	441	41	NN190525	Hu,M,Sim
211	101	Am Faochagach	1891	15A: Loch Broom to Strath Oykel	Highland	952.8	367	3,126	1,204	20	NH303793	Ma,M,Sim
212	113	Beinn Mhanach	1891	02A: Loch Rannoch to Glen Lyon	Perth and Kinross	952.5	315	3,125	1,033	50	NN373411	Ma,M,Sim
213	237	Aonach Eagach - Meall Dearg	1891	03A: Loch Leven to Rannoch Station	Highland	952.3	120.3	3,124	395	41	NN161583	Hu,M,Sim
214	79	Meall Chuaich	1891	05B: Loch Ericht to Glen Tromie & Glen Garry	Highland	950.8	466	3,119	1,528	42	NN716878	Ma,M,Sim
215	242	Meall Gorm	1891	14B: The Fannaichs	Highland	949.7	112.3	3,116	368	20	NH221695	Hu,M,Sim
216	55	Beinn Bhuidhe	1891	01D: Inveraray to Crianlarich	Argyll and Bute	948.5	592	3,112	1,942	50 56	NN203187	Ma,M,Sim
217	280	Sgurr Mhic Choinnich	1933	17B: Minginish and the Cuillin Hills	Highland	948.1	56	3,111	184	32	NG450210	M,Sim
218	215	Driesh	1891	07A: Braemar to Montrose	Angus	947.6	136.9	3,109	449	44	NO271735	Hu,M,Sim
219	268	Creag a' Mhaim	1891	10A: Glen Shiel to Loch Hourn and Loch Quoich	Highland	946.2	79.6	3,104	262	33	NH087077	M,Sim
220	236	Beinn Tulaichean	1891	01C: Loch Lomond to Strathyre	Stirling	945.8	121.8	3,103	400	56	NN416196	Hu,M,Sim
221	58	Càrn Dearg	1891	09B: Glen Albyn and the Monadh Liath	Highland	945.7	591	3,103	1,939	35	NH635023	Ma,M,Sim
222	140	Sgurr na Sgine	1891	10A: Glen Shiel to Loch Hourn and Loch Quoich	Highland	945.7	247	3,103	810	33	NG946113	Ma,M,Sim
223	70	Meall Buidhe	1891	10B: Knoydart to Glen Kingie	Highland	945.5	495	3,102	1,624	33 40	NM848989	Ma,M,Sim
224	173	Càrn Bhac	1933	06B: Pitlochry to Braemar & Blairgowrie	Aberdeenshire	945.1	186.9	3,101	613	43	NO051832	Ma,M,Sim
225	128	Stob a' Choire Odhair	1891	03C: Glen Etive to Glen Lochy	Argyll and Bute/ Highland	945	279.4	3,100	916	50	NN257459	Ma,M,Sim
226	156	Bidein a' Choire Sheasgaich	1891	12A: Kyle of Lochalsh to Garve	Highland	945	208.2	3,100	683	25	NH049412	Ma,M,Sim
227	262	Sgurr Dubh Mor	1891	17B: Minginish and the Cuillin Hills	Highland	944.1	89	3,097	292	32	NG457205	M,Sim
228	48	Ben Vorlich	1891	01D: Inveraray to Crianlarich	Argyll and Bute	942.8	632	3,093	2,073	50 56	NN295124	Ma,M,Sim,CoH
229	172	An Socach	1974	06B: Pitlochry to Braemar & Blairgowrie	Aberdeenshire	942.8	187	3,093	614	43	NO079799	Ma,M,Sim
230	166	Binnein Beag	1891	04A: Fort William to Loch Treig & Loch Leven	Highland	941.5	196.6	3,089	645	41	NN221677	Ma,M,Sim
231	216	Beinn a' Chroin	1999	01C: Loch Lomond to Strathyre	Stirling	941.4	136.9	3,089	449	50 56	NN387185	Hu,M,Sim
232	155	Carn Dearg	1891	04B: Loch Treig to Loch Ericht	Highland/ Perth and Kinross	941	220.7	3,087	724	42	NN417661	Ma,M,Sim
233	107	Càrn na Caim	1891	05B: Loch Ericht to Glen Tromie & Glen Garry	Highland/ Perth and Kinross	940.8	328.1	3,087	1,073	42	NN677821	Ma,M,Sim
234	115	Mount Keen (Monadh Caoin)	1891	07B: Braemar to Montrose	Aberdeenshire/Angus	939.4	312	3,082	1,024	44	NO409869	Ma,M,Sim
235	260	Mullach nan Coirean	1891	04A: Fort William to Loch Treig & Loch Leven	Highland	939.3	92.3	3,082	303	41	NN122662	M,Sim,sHu
236	134	Luinne Bheinn	1891	10B: Knoydart to Glen Kingie	Highland	938.6	256.6	3,079	842	33	NG869007	Ma,M,Sim
237	51	Sron a' Choire Ghairbh	1891	10C: Loch Arkaig to Glen Moriston	Highland	936.2	621	3,072	2,037	34	NN222945	Ma,M,Sim
238	247	A' Bhuidheanach Bheag	1933	05B: Loch Ericht to Glen Tromie & Glen Garry	Highland/ Perth and Kinross	936	109	3,071	358	42	NN660775	Hu,M,Sim
239	40	Beinn Sgulaird	1891	03B: Loch Linnhe to Loch Etive	Argyll and Bute	935	660	3,068	2,165	50	NN053460	Ma,M,Sim
240	93	Beinn na Lap	1891	04B: Loch Treig to Loch Ericht	Highland	935	406	3,068	1,332	41	NN376695	Ma,M,Sim
241	240	Meall a' Chrasgaidh	1891	14B: The Fannaichs	Highland	934.4	115	3,066	377	20	NH184733	Hu,M,Sim
242	281	Am Basteir	1933	17B: Minginish and the Cuillin Hills	Highland	934	49	3,064	161	32	NG465253	M,Sim
243	159	Beinn Tarsuinn	1953	14A: Loch Maree to Loch Broom	Highland	933.8	207.1	3,064	679	19	NH039727	Ma,M,Sim
244	42	Fionn Bheinn	1891	14B: The Fannaichs	Highland	933.4	658	3,062	2,159	20	NH147621	Ma,M,Sim
245	67	Maol Chean-dearg	1891	13B: Applecross to Achnasheen	Highland	933	514	3,061	1,686	25	NG924499	Ma,M,Sim
246	226	The Cairnwell	1891	06B: Pitlochry to Braemar & Blairgowrie	Aberdeenshire/ Perth and Kinross	933	127.1	3,061	417	43	NO134773	Hu,M,Sim
247	114	Beinn Chabhair	1891	01C: Loch Lomond to Strathyre	Stirling	932.2	313	3,058	1,027	50 56	NN367179	Ma,M,Sim
248	108	Meall Buidhe	1891	02A: Loch Rannoch to Glen Lyon	Perth and Kinross	932.1	321.1	3,058	1,053	51	NN498499	Ma,M,Sim
249	45	Ben Chonzie	1891	01A: Loch Tay to Perth	Perth and Kinross	930.4	646.9	3,052	2,122	51 52	NN773308	Ma,M,Sim
250	267	Beinn Bhreac	1891	08B: Cairngorms	Aberdeenshire	930.3	80.9	3,052	265	36 43	NO058970	M,Sim
251	248	A' Chailleach	1891	09B: Glen Albyn and the Monadh Liath	Highland	929.3	108.3	3,049	355	35	NH681041	Hu,M,Sim
252	13	Blà Bheinn (Blaven)	1891	17B: Minginish and the Cuillin Hills	Highland	928.8	859	3,047	2,818	32	NG529217	Ma,M,Sim
253	244	Mayar	1891	07A: Braemar to Montrose	Angus	928.6	112	3,047	367	44	NO240737	Hu,M,Sim
254	181	Meall nan Eun	1891	03C: Glen Etive to Glen Lochy	Argyll and Bute	928.1	174.5	3,045	573	50	NN192449	Ma,M,Sim
255	28	Ben Hope (Beinn Hòb)	1891	16B: Durness to Loch Shin	Highland	927	772	3,041	2,533	9	NC477501	Ma,M,Sim
256	191	Eididh nan Clach Geala	1891	15A: Loch Broom to Strath Oykel	Highland	927	166	3,041	545	20	NH257842	Ma,M,Sim
257	125	Beinn Narnain	1891	01D: Inveraray to Crianlarich	Argyll and Bute	926.8	290	3,041	951	56	NN271066	Ma,M,Sim
258	224	Sgurr nan Eag	1891	17B: Minginish and the Cuillin Hills	Highland	926.3	130.3	3,039	427	32	NG457195	Hu,M,Sim
259	256	Geal Chàrn	1891	09B: Glen Albyn and the Monadh Liath	Highland	926.3	101.1	3,039	332	35	NN561987	Hu,M,Sim
260	130	Beinn Liath Mhòr	1891	13B: Applecross to Achnasheen	Highland	926	271	3,038	889	25	NG964519	Ma,M,Sim
261	138	Seana Bhraigh	1891	15A: Loch Broom to Strath Oykel	Highland	926	251	3,038	823	20	NH281878	Ma,M,Sim
262	56	Moruisg	1891	12A: Kyle of Lochalsh to Garve	Highland	925.7	592	3,037	1,942	25	NH101499	Ma,M,Sim
263	202	Meall a' Choire Leith	1891	02B: Glen Lyon to Glen Dochart & Loch Tay	Perth and Kinross	925.6	150.5	3,037	494	51	NN612438	Ma,M,Sim
264	180	Buachaille Etive Beag - Stob Coire Raineach (Buachaille Èite Beag)	1997	03B: Loch Linnhe to Loch Etive	Highland	924.5	177.7	3,033	581	41	NN191548	Ma,M,Sim
265	252	Creag Pitridh	1891	04B: Loch Treig to Loch Ericht	Highland	924.5	104.2	3,033	342	34 42	NN487814	Hu,M,Sim
266	204	An Coileachan	1891	14B: The Fannaichs	Highland	924	148.3	3,031	487	20	NH241680	Hu,M,Sim,sMa
267	245	Sgurr nan Each	1891	14B: The Fannaichs	Highland	924	110.6	3,031	363	20	NH184697	Hu,M,Sim
268	197	Beinn Alligin - Tom na Gruagaich (Beinn Àilleagan)	1997	13A: Loch Torridon to Loch Maree	Highland	921.8	154.2	3,024	506	19 24	NG859601	Ma,M,Sim
269	275	Carn Sgulain	1891	09B: Glen Albyn and the Monadh Liath	Highland	920.3	71.6	3,019	235	35	NH683058	M,Sim
270	117	Sgiath Chuil	1933	02B: Glen Lyon to Glen Dochart & Loch Tay	Stirling	920.1	311	3,019	1,020	51	NN462317	Ma,M,Sim
271	233	An Socach	1891	11A: Loch Duich to Cannich	Highland	919.7	123.8	3,017	406	25 33	NH088229	Hu,M,Sim
272	63	Gairich	1891	10B: Knoydart to Glen Kingie	Highland	918.8	552	3,014	1,811	33	NN025995	Ma,M,Sim
273	186	Ruadh Stac Mor	1974	14A: Loch Maree to Loch Broom	Highland	918.7	169.8	3,014	557	19	NH018756	Ma,M,Sim,xC
274	273	Sgurr a' Mhadaidh	1933	17B: Minginish and the Cuillin Hills	Highland	918	72.9	3,012	239	32	NG446235	M,Sim
275	167	Creag nan Damh	1891	10A: Glen Shiel to Loch Hourn and Loch Quoich	Highland	917.2	196	3,009	643	33	NG983112	Ma,M,Sim
276	94	A' Ghlas-bheinn	1891	11A: Loch Duich to Cannich	Highland	917.1	406	3,009	1,332	25 33	NH008231	Ma,M,Sim
277	179	Geal-chàrn	1891	05A: Loch Ericht to Glen Tromie & Glen Garry	Highland	917.1	178	3,009	584	42	NN596782	Ma,M,Sim
278	119	Meall na Teanga	1933	10C: Loch Arkaig to Glen Moriston	Highland	916.8	305.5	3,008	1,002	34	NN220924	Ma,M,Sim
279	211	Beinn a' Chleibh	1891	01D: Inveraray to Crianlarich	Argyll and Bute/ Stirling	916.3	139.9	3,006	459	50	NN250256	Hu,M,Sim,sMa
280	90	Ben Vane	1891	01D: Inveraray to Crianlarich	Argyll and Bute	915.76	424	3,004	1,391	56	NN277098	Ma,M,Sim
281	235	Càrn Aosda	1891	06B: Pitlochry to Braemar & Blairgowrie	Aberdeenshire	915.3	122.1	3,003	401	43	NO133791	Hu,M,Sim
282	122	Beinn Teallach	1984	09C: Loch Lochy to Loch Laggan	Highland	914.6	301.5	3,001	988	34 41	NN361859	Ma,M,Sim,xC

== Munro Tops by height ==
This list was downloaded from the DoBIH in December 2021, and is restricted to peaks which the DoBIH marks as being Munro Tops ("MT"). The SMC updates its list of official Munro Tops from time to time, and the DoBIH also updates its measurements as more detailed surveys are recorded, so these tables should not be amended or updated unless the entire DoBIH data is re-downloaded again.

Scottish Mountaineering Club ("SMC") Munro Tops, ranked by height (DoBIH, December 2021)
Height Rank	Name	Parent Peak (SMC Definition)	Section / Region	County	Height (m)	Height (ft)	Prom. (m)	Prom. (ft)	Topo Map	OS Grid Reference	§ DoBIH codes
1	Càrn na Criche	Braeriach	08A: Cairngorms	Aberdeenshire	1,265	4,150	50	164	36 43	NN939982	MT,Sim
2	Càrn Dearg (NW)	Ben Nevis	04A: Fort William to Loch Treig & Loch Leven	Highland	1,221	4,006	36	118	41	NN159719	MT,Sim
3	Cairn Lochan	Cairn Gorm	08A: Cairngorms	Highland/ Moray	1,216	3,990	91	299	36	NH985025	MT,Sim,sHu
4	Stob Coire an t-Saighdeir	Cairn Toul	08A: Cairngorms	Aberdeenshire	1,213	3,980	46	151	36 43	NN962963	MT,Sim
5	Sron na Lairige	Braeriach	08A: Cairngorms	Aberdeenshire/ Highland	1,184	3,885	50	164	36	NH964006	MT,Sim
6	Càrn Dearg Meadhonach	Càrn Mòr Dearg	04A: Fort William to Loch Treig & Loch Leven	Highland	1,179	3,868	27	89	41	NN175726	MT,sSim
7	Beinn a' Bhùird South Top	Beinn a' Bhùird	08B: Cairngorms	Aberdeenshire	1,178.5	3,866	49.5	164	36 43	NO091986	MT,Sim
8	Stob Coire an t-Sneachda	Cairn Gorm	08A: Cairngorms	Highland/ Moray	1,176	3,858	65	213	36	NH996029	MT,Sim
9	Cnap a' Chleirich	Beinn a' Bhùird	08B: Cairngorms	Aberdeenshire/ Moray	1,174	3,852	33	108	36	NJ107010	MT,Sim
10	Cnap Coire na Spreidhe	Cairn Gorm	08A: Cairngorms	Highland	1,150	3,773	15	49	36	NJ013049	MT
11	Stob a' Choire Dhomhain	Càrn Eige	11A: Loch Duich to Cannich	Highland	1,146.5	3,761	50	164	25	NH131264	MT,Sim
12	Sgurr nan Ceathreamhnan West Top	Sgurr nan Ceathreamhnan	11A: Loch Duich to Cannich	Highland	1,143	3,750	38	125	25 33	NH052228	MT,Sim
13	Stob Coire Dhomhnuill	Càrn Eige	11A: Loch Duich to Cannich	Highland	1,139.1	3,737	33.1	109	25	NH137262	MT,Sim
14	Sròn Garbh	Càrn Eige	11A: Loch Duich to Cannich	Highland	1,131	3,711	24	79	25	NH144263	MT,sSim
15	Stob Coire na Ceannain	Stob Choire Claurigh	04A: Fort William to Loch Treig & Loch Leven	Highland	1,123	3,684	59	194	41	NN267745	MT,Sim
16	Carn Etchachan	Ben Macdui	08A: Cairngorms	Aberdeenshire/ Moray	1,120	3,675	26	85	36	NJ003009	MT,sSim
17	Stob Coire nan Lochan	Bidean nam Bian	03B: Loch Linnhe to Loch Etive	Highland	1,115.6	3,660	116.5	382	41	NN148548	Hu,MT,Sim
18	Sron Riach	Ben Macdui	08A: Cairngorms	Aberdeenshire	1,113	3,652	28	92	36 43	NN999977	MT,sSim
19	Sgoran Dubh Mòr	Sgor Gaoith	08A: Cairngorms	Highland	1,111	3,645	58	190	36	NH904002	MT,Sim
20	Creagan a' Choire Etchachan	Derry Cairngorm	08A: Cairngorms	Aberdeenshire	1,108	3,635	55	180	36 43	NO011996	MT,Sim
21	Stob an t-Sluichd	Beinn a' Bhuird	08B: Cairngorms	Moray	1,107	3,632	25	82	36	NJ112027	MT,sSim
22	Stob Coire nam Beith	Bidean nam Bian	03B: Loch Linnhe to Loch Etive	Highland	1,106.9	3,632	28.1	92	41	NN138546	MT,sSim
23	Caisteal	Stob Coire an Laoigh	04A: Fort William to Loch Treig & Loch Leven	Highland	1,106	3,629	51	167	41	NN246729	MT,Sim
24	Stob a' Choire Leith	Stob Choire Claurigh	04A: Fort William to Loch Treig & Loch Leven	Highland	1,105	3,625	14	46	41	NN256736	MT
25	Stob Dearg	Ben Cruachan	03C: Glen Etive to Glen Lochy	Argyll and Bute	1,103.1	3,619	97.8	321	50	NN062307	MT,Sim,sHu
26	Stob Choire Bhealach	Aonach Beag	04A: Fort William to Loch Treig & Loch Leven	Highland	1,101	3,612	17.1	49	41	NN201708	MT
27	Clach Leathad	Creise	03C: Glen Etive to Glen Lochy	Highland	1,099	3,606	67.8	222	50	NN240493	MT,Sim
28	Sgurr nan Clachan Geala	Sgurr na Lapaich	12B: Killilan to Inverness	Highland	1,093	3,586	62	203	25	NH161342	MT,Sim
29	Càrn Eas	Ben Avon - Leabaidh an Daimh Bhuidhe	08B: Cairngorms	Aberdeenshire	1,087.9	3,569	25	72	36 43	NO122992	MT,sSim
30	An Riabhachan	An Riabhachan	12B: Killilan to Inverness	Highland	1,086	3,563	13	43	25	NH122336	MT
31	Cuidhe Crom	Lochnagar - Cac Carn Beag	07A: Braemar to Montrose	Aberdeenshire	1,083.2	3,554	39.6	125	44	NO259849	MT,Sim
32	Stob Coire Cath na Sine	Stob Coire an Laoigh	04A: Fort William to Loch Treig & Loch Leven	Highland	1,082.4	3,551	18.9	49	41	NN252730	MT
33	Stob Coire Etchachan	Beinn Mheadhoin	08A: Cairngorms	Aberdeenshire/ Moray	1,082	3,550	27	89	36	NJ024005	MT,sSim
34	Stob Coire Easain	Stob Coire an Laoigh	04A: Fort William to Loch Treig & Loch Leven	Highland	1,080	3,543	45	148	41	NN234727	MT,Sim
35	Stuc Bheag	Sgurr nan Ceathreamhnan	11A: Loch Duich to Cannich	Highland	1,075	3,527	48	157	25 33	NH053237	MT,Sim
36	An Tudair	Mam Sodhail	11A: Loch Duich to Cannich	Highland	1,073.4	3,522	64	217	25	NH127239	MT,Sim
37	Puist Coire Ardair	Creag Meagaidh	09C: Loch Lochy to Loch Laggan	Highland	1,070.8	3,513	47.1	148	34 42	NN437872	MT,Sim
38	Stob an Chul Choire	Aonach Mor	04A: Fort William to Loch Treig & Loch Leven	Highland	1,070.1	3,511	69.1	236	41	NN203731	MT,Sim
39	Stob Coire an Lochain	Stob Binnein	01C: Loch Lomond to Strathyre	Stirling (council area)	1,068	3,504	23	75	51	NN438220	MT,sSim
40	Creag a' Ghlas-uillt	Carn a' Choire Bhoidheach	07A: Braemar to Montrose	Aberdeenshire	1,066.9	3,500	15.9	52	44	NO242842	MT
41	Binnein Mòr South Top	Binnein Mor	04A: Fort William to Loch Treig & Loch Leven	Highland	1,062	3,484	24	79	41	NN211656	MT,sSim
42	Airgiod Bheinn	Beinn a' Ghlo - Carn nan Gabhar	06B: Pitlochry to Braemar & Blairgowrie	Perth and Kinross	1,061.7	3,483	53.1	174	43	NN961719	MT,Sim
43	Creag Coire nan Each	Mam Sodhail	11A: Loch Duich to Cannich	Highland	1,055	3,461	27	89	25	NH113232	MT,sSim
44	Creag an Leth-choin	Cairn Gorm	08A: Cairngorms	Highland	1,053	3,455	56	184	36	NH968033	MT,Sim
45	Càrn Bàn Mòr	Sgor Gaoith	08A: Cairngorms	Highland	1,052	3,451	40	131	35 36 43	NN893972	MT,Sim
46	An Leth-chreag	Tom a' Choinich	11A: Loch Duich to Cannich	Highland	1,051	3,448	57	187	25	NH154269	MT,Sim
47	Top of Eagle's Rock	Carn a' Choire Bhoidheach	07A: Braemar to Montrose	Aberdeenshire	1,049.2	3,442	16.5	56	44	NO237838	MT
48	Beinn a' Chaorainn South Top	Beinn a' Chaorainn	09C: Loch Lochy to Loch Laggan	Highland	1,048.5	3,440	25.7	82	34 41	NN386845	MT,sSim
49	Corrag Bhuidhe	An Teallach - Sgurr Fiona	14A: Loch Maree to Loch Broom	Highland	1,047.2	3,436	40.5	144	19	NH064834	MT,Sim
50	Creag an Fhithich	Ben Lawers	02B: Glen Lyon to Glen Dochart & Loch Tay	Perth and Kinross	1,047	3,435	19	62	51	NN635422	MT
51	Bidean an Eoin Deirg	Sgùrr a' Chaorachain	12A: Kyle of Lochalsh to Garve	Highland	1,046.6	3,434	85	279	25	NH103443	MT,Sim
52	Càrn an t-Sagairt Beag	Carn a' Choire Bhoidheach	07A: Braemar to Montrose	Aberdeenshire	1,044.3	3,426	41	135	44	NO216848	MT,Sim
53	Beinn a' Chaorainn North Top	Beinn a' Chaorainn	09C: Loch Lochy to Loch Laggan	Highland	1,042.9	3,422	37.1	128	34 41	NN383857	MT,Sim
54	Stuc Mòr	Sgurr nan Ceathreamhnan	11A: Loch Duich to Cannich	Highland	1,041	3,415	50	164	25 33	NH053242	MT,Sim
55	Na Gruagaichean NW Top	Na Gruagaichean	04A: Fort William to Loch Treig & Loch Leven	Highland	1,038.8	3,408	44.3	145	41	NN201654	MT,Sim
56	An Riabhachan West Top	An Riabhachan	12B: Killilan to Inverness	Highland	1,038	3,406	37	121	25	NH117337	MT,Sim
57	Sgurr na Lapaich	Mam Sodhail	11A: Loch Duich to Cannich	Highland	1,037.3	3,403	110.2	358	25	NH154243	Hu,MT,Sim
58	Tom a' Choinich Beag	Tom a' Choinich	11A: Loch Duich to Cannich	Highland	1,032	3,386	13	43	25	NH157272	MT
59	Lord Berkeley's Seat	An Teallach - Sgurr Fiona	14A: Loch Maree to Loch Broom	Highland	1,031.5	3,384	21.5	72	19	NH064835	MT,sSim
60	Creag Ghorm a' Bhealaich	Sgurr Fhuar-thuill	12A: Kyle of Lochalsh to Garve	Highland	1,030	3,379	81	266	25	NH244435	MT,Sim
61	Meall Coire Choille-rais	Creag Meagaidh	09C: Loch Lochy to Loch Laggan	Highland	1,028	3,373	50.3	161	34 42	NN432862	MT,Sim
62	Sgor Iutharn	Geal-chàrn	04B: Loch Treig to Loch Ericht	Highland	1,028	3,373	57	187	42	NN489743	MT,Sim
63	Stob Coire Dheirg	Ben Starav	03C: Glen Etive to Glen Lochy	Argyll and Bute/ Highland	1,027.7	3,372	13	43	50	NN131426	MT
64	Meall Garbh	Meall nan Tarmachan	02B: Glen Lyon to Glen Dochart & Loch Tay	Perth and Kinross/ Stirling	1,026.7	3,368	75.2	247	51	NN578383	MT,Sim
65	Drochaid Ghlas	Ben Cruachan	03C: Glen Etive to Glen Lochy	Argyll and Bute	1,024.4	3,361	90.6	297	50	NN083307	MT,Sim,sHu
66	West Meur Gorm Craig	Ben Avon - Leabaidh an Daimh Bhuidhe	08B: Cairngorms	Moray	1,023.1	3,357	41.4	131	36	NJ153036	MT,Sim
67	Càrn Dearg (SW)	Ben Nevis	04A: Fort William to Loch Treig & Loch Leven	Highland	1,020	3,346	35	115	41	NN155701	MT,Sim
68	A' Choinneach	Bynack More	08A: Cairngorms	Highland/ Moray	1,017	3,337	77	253	36	NJ032048	MT,Sim
69	Beinn a' Chaorainn Bheag	Beinn a' Chaorainn	08B: Cairngorms	Moray	1,017	3,337	65	213	36	NJ057017	MT,Sim
70	Sgurr Creag an Eich	An Teallach - Sgurr Fiona	14A: Loch Maree to Loch Broom	Highland	1,016.4	3,335	96.9	318	19	NH055838	MT,Sim,sHu
71	Sgurr na Fearstaig	Sgurr Fhuar-thuill	12A: Kyle of Lochalsh to Garve	Highland	1,015	3,330	28	92	25	NH228437	MT,sSim
72	Stacan Dubha	Beinn Mheadhoin	08A: Cairngorms	Moray	1,014	3,327	25	82	36	NJ012014	MT,sSim
73	Meall Liath	Carn Mairg	02A: Loch Rannoch to Glen Lyon	Perth and Kinross	1,012	3,320	60	197	42 51	NN692512	MT,Sim
74	Stob na Doire	Buachaille Etive Mor - Stob Dearg	03B: Loch Linnhe to Loch Etive	Highland	1,010.5	3,315	144	472	41	NN207532	Hu,MT,Sim,sMa
75	Stob Coire na Craileig	A' Chraileag	11B: Glen Affric to Glen Moriston	Highland	1,008	3,307	56	184	33	NH091163	MT,Sim
76	Beinn na Socaich	Stob Coire an Laoigh	04A: Fort William to Loch Treig & Loch Leven	Highland	1,007	3,304	19	62	41	NN236734	MT
77	Creag Coire na Fiar Bhealaich	Gleouraich	10A: Glen Shiel to Loch Hourn and Loch Quoich	Highland	1,006	3,301	59	194	33	NH047051	MT,Sim
78	Meall a' Bharr	Carn Mairg	02A: Loch Rannoch to Glen Lyon	Perth and Kinross	1,004	3,294	36	118	42 51	NN668515	MT,Sim
79	Beinn Achaladair South Top	Beinn Achaladair	02A: Loch Rannoch to Glen Lyon	Argyll and Bute/ Perth and Kinross	1,003.6	3,293	46.7	153	50	NN342420	MT,Sim
80	Sron a' Choire	Creag Meagaidh	09C: Loch Lochy to Loch Laggan	Highland	1,001.8	3,287	22.7	75	34 42	NN448877	MT,sSim
81	Beinn nan Eachan	Meall nan Tarmachan	02B: Glen Lyon to Glen Dochart & Loch Tay	Stirling (council area)	1,000.1	3,281	90.5	297	51	NN570383	MT,Sim,sHu
82	Fafernie	Cairn Bannoch	07A: Braemar to Montrose	Aberdeenshire/Angus	1,000	3,281	16	52	44	NO215823	MT
83	Sgurr an Iubhair	Sgurr a' Mhaim	04A: Fort William to Loch Treig & Loch Leven	Highland	999.7	3,280	76.8	252	41	NN165655	MT,Sim
84	Drochaid an Tuill Easaich	Sgurr nan Conbhairean	11B: Glen Affric to Glen Moriston	Highland	998.5	3,276	27.8	95	34	NH120134	MT,sSim
85	Beinn Challuim South Top	Beinn Challuim	02B: Glen Lyon to Glen Dochart & Loch Tay	Stirling (council area)	998	3,274	45	148	50	NN386315	MT,Sim
86	Creag a' Chaorainn	Sgurr nan Conbhairean	11B: Glen Affric to Glen Moriston	Highland	998	3,274	37	121	34	NH137131	MT,Sim
87	Meall Dubhag	Sgor Gaoith	08A: Cairngorms	Highland	998	3,274	32	105	35 36 43	NN880955	MT,Sim
88	Càrn na Coire Mheadhoin (Centre Top)	Sail Chaorainn	11B: Glen Affric to Glen Moriston	Highland	997.9	3,274	38	118	34	NH134158	MT,Sim
89	Mullach Cadha Rainich	Mam Sodhail	11A: Loch Duich to Cannich	Highland	995.6	3,266	35.3	112	25	NH139246	MT,Sim
90	Stob a' Ghlais Choire	Creise	03C: Glen Etive to Glen Lochy	Highland	995.6	3,266	25.8	85	41	NN239516	MT,sSim
91	An Cearcallach	Creag Meagaidh	09C: Loch Lochy to Loch Laggan	Highland	993.1	3,258	36.4	115	34 42	NN422853	MT,Sim
92	Càrn nam Fiaclan	Maoile Lunndaidh	12A: Kyle of Lochalsh to Garve	Highland	993	3,258	11	36	25	NH123455	MT
93	Sron Coire a' Chriochairein	Stob Poite Coire Ardair	09C: Loch Lochy to Loch Laggan	Highland	993	3,258	27	89	34 42	NN447899	MT,sSim
94	Cairn of Gowal	Cairn Bannoch	07A: Braemar to Montrose	Aberdeenshire/Angus	991	3,251	22	72	44	NO226820	MT,sSim
95	Sgurr nan Spainteach	Sgurr na Ciste Duibhe	11A: Loch Duich to Cannich	Highland	990	3,248	65	213	33	NG991150	MT,Sim
96	Sròn a' Ghearrain	Stob Ghabhar	03C: Glen Etive to Glen Lochy	Argyll and Bute/ Highland	990	3,248	14	46	50	NN221456	MT
97	Stob Choire a' Mhail	Sgurr a' Mhaim	04A: Fort William to Loch Treig & Loch Leven	Highland	990	3,248	66	217	41	NN163660	MT,Sim
98	Sgurr an Fhuarail	Aonach Meadhoin	11A: Loch Duich to Cannich	Highland	987	3,238	71	233	33	NH054139	MT,Sim
99	Mam nan Càrn	Beinn Iutharn Mhor	06B: Pitlochry to Braemar & Blairgowrie	Perth and Kinross	986	3,235	76	249	43	NO049779	MT,Sim
100	Stob a' Choire Liath Mhòr	Liathach - Spidean a' Choire Leith	13A: Loch Torridon to Loch Maree	Highland	983.5	3,227	51.8	171	25	NG932581	MT,Sim
101	Creag an Dubh-loch	Broad Cairn	07A: Braemar to Montrose	Aberdeenshire	983	3,225	47	154	44	NO232823	MT,Sim
102	Sgurr an Lochan Uaine	Derry Cairngorm	08A: Cairngorms	Aberdeenshire	983	3,225	44	144	36 43	NO025991	MT,Sim
103	Stob Garbh	Stob Daimh	03C: Glen Etive to Glen Lochy	Argyll and Bute	981.7	3,221	50.5	166	50	NN095302	MT,Sim
104	Meikle Pap	Lochnagar - Cac Carn Beag	07A: Braemar to Montrose	Aberdeenshire	980	3,215	63	207	44	NO259860	MT,Sim
105	Sàil Mhòr	Beinn Eighe - Spidean Coire nan Clach	13A: Loch Torridon to Loch Maree	Highland	980	3,215	118	387	19	NG938605	Hu,MT,Sim
106	Glas Mheall Mòr	An Teallach - Bidein a' Ghlas Thuill	14A: Loch Maree to Loch Broom	Highland	979.5	3,214	102.7	331	19	NH076853	Hu,MT,Sim
107	Mullach Coire Mhic Fhearchair East Top	Mullach Coire Mhic Fhearchair	14A: Loch Maree to Loch Broom	Highland	977.8	3,208	29.4	96	19	NH056733	MT,sSim
108	Meall Buidhe	Beinn a' Chreachain	02A: Loch Rannoch to Glen Lyon	Argyll and Bute/ Perth and Kinross	977.2	3,206	53	174	50	NN359438	MT,Sim
109	Sgurr Thearlaich	Sgurr Alasdair	17B: Minginish and the Cuillin Hills	Highland	977.1	3,206	22	72	32	NG450207	MT,sSim
110	Coinneach Mhòr	Beinn Eighe - Spidean Coire nan Clach	13A: Loch Torridon to Loch Maree	Highland	976	3,202	108	354	19	NG944600	Hu,MT,Sim
111	Meall Buidhe	Sgor Gaoith	08A: Cairngorms	Highland	976	3,202	36	118	35 36	NH891001	MT,Sim
112	Meall Garbh	Chno Dearg	04B: Loch Treig to Loch Ericht	Highland	976	3,202	53	174	41	NN371727	MT,Sim
113	An Garbhanach	An Gearanach	04A: Fort William to Loch Treig & Loch Leven	Highland	974.9	3,198	25.3	83	41	NN188665	MT,sSim
114	Meall nam Peithirean	Sgurr Mor	14B: The Fannaichs	Highland	974.3	3,197	29.3	96	20	NH207708	MT,sSim
115	Meall Coire na Saobhaidhe	Lochnagar - Cac Carn Beag	07A: Braemar to Montrose	Aberdeenshire	974	3,196	70	230	44	NO242872	MT,Sim
116	Meall Mòr	Lurg Mhòr	12A: Kyle of Lochalsh to Garve	Highland	974	3,196	39	128	25	NH072405	MT,Sim
117	Mullach Sithidh	Mullach na Dheiragain	11A: Loch Duich to Cannich	Highland	974	3,196	49	161	25 33	NH082264	MT,Sim
118	Little Glas Maol	Glas Maol	07A: Braemar to Montrose	Angus	973	3,192	21	69	43	NO175759	MT,sSim
119	Creag an Dail Mhòr	Ben Avon - Leabaidh an Daimh Bhuidhe	08B: Cairngorms	Aberdeenshire	972	3,189	64.4	203	36 43	NO131982	MT,Sim
120	Bynack Beg	Bynack More	08A: Cairngorms	Highland	970	3,182	23	75	36	NJ036068	MT,sSim
121	Meall an t-Snaim	Carn Liath	09C: Loch Lochy to Loch Laggan	Highland	970	3,182	35	115	34	NN459904	MT,Sim
122	Sgurr Bàn	Beinn Eighe - Spidean Coire nan Clach	13A: Loch Torridon to Loch Maree	Highland	970	3,182	65	213	19	NG974600	MT,Sim
123	Sgurr a' Ghreadaidh South Top	Sgurr a' Ghreadaidh	17B: Minginish and the Cuillin Hills	Highland	969.9	3,182	16	49	32	NG445230	MT
125	Garbh Chioch Bheag	Garbh Chioch Mhor	10B: Knoydart to Glen Kingie	Highland	968.3	3,177	28.1	85	33 40	NM918959	MT,sSim
124	Ceann Garbh	Meall nan Ceapraichean	15A: Loch Broom to Strath Oykel	Highland	968	3,176	21	69	20	NH259830	MT,sSim
126	Stob an Fhuarain	Sgurr na h-Ulaidh	03B: Loch Linnhe to Loch Etive	Highland	968	3,176	103	338	41	NN118523	Hu,MT,Sim
127	Càrn na Con Dhu	Mullach na Dheiragain	11A: Loch Duich to Cannich	Highland	967	3,173	82	269	25 33	NH072241	MT,Sim
128	Sròn An Isean	Stob Daimh	03C: Glen Etive to Glen Lochy	Argyll and Bute	966.6	3,171	55	180	50	NN099311	MT,Sim
129	Meall na Dìge	Stob Binnein	01C: Loch Lomond to Strathyre	Stirling (council area)	966	3,169	82	269	51	NN450225	MT,Sim
130	Sgurr na Forcan	The Saddle	10A: Glen Shiel to Loch Hourn and Loch Quoich	Highland	964.6	3,165	28.6	94	33	NG940130	MT,sSim
131	Sgurr a' Bhuic	Aonach Beag	04A: Fort William to Loch Treig & Loch Leven	Highland	963	3,159	65	213	41	NN204701	MT,Sim
132	Sgurr Choinnich Beag	Sgurr Choinnich Mor	04A: Fort William to Loch Treig & Loch Leven	Highland	963	3,159	62	203	41	NN220710	MT,Sim
133	Sgurr nan Fhir Duibhe	Beinn Eighe - Spidean Coire nan Clach	13A: Loch Torridon to Loch Maree	Highland	963	3,159	117	384	19	NG981600	Hu,MT,Sim
134	Sgurr a' Dubh Doire	Beinn Fhada	11A: Loch Duich to Cannich	Highland	962	3,156	48	157	33	NH034185	MT,Sim
135	Carn na Criche	Sgurr Mor	14B: The Fannaichs	Highland	961.7	3,155	70.7	226	20	NH196725	MT,Sim
136	Druim Mòr	Cairn of Claise	07A: Braemar to Montrose	Angus	961	3,153	17	56	43	NO189771	MT
137	Gulvain South Top	Gulvain	10D: Mallaig to Fort William	Highland	961	3,153	98	322	40	NM996864	MT,Sim,sHu
138	Glas Mheall Liath	An Teallach - Bidein a' Ghlas Thuill	14A: Loch Maree to Loch Broom	Highland	960.5	3,151	32.4	106	19	NH077841	MT,Sim
139	Ben More Assynt South Top	Ben More Assynt	16E: Scourie to Lairg	Highland	960	3,150	47	154	15	NC324192	MT,Sim
140	Stob a' Choire Odhair	Ladhar Bheinn	10B: Knoydart to Glen Kingie	Highland	960	3,150	45	148	33	NG830043	MT,Sim
141	Stob Cadha Gobhlach	An Teallach - Sgurr Fiona	14A: Loch Maree to Loch Broom	Highland	958.5	3,145	126.2	413	19	NH068825	Hu,MT,Sim
142	Stob Coire na Gaibhre	Stob Choire Claurigh	04A: Fort William to Loch Treig & Loch Leven	Highland	958	3,143	34	112	41	NN260757	MT,Sim
143	Stob Coire Sgriodain South Top	Stob Coire Sgriodain	04B: Loch Treig to Loch Ericht	Highland	958	3,143	45	148	41	NN359738	MT,Sim
144	Stob Garbh	Cruach Ardrain	01C: Loch Lomond to Strathyre	Stirling (council area)	957.7	3,142	104	341	51	NN411221	Hu,MT,Sim
145	Stob nan Clach	Creag Mhor	02B: Glen Lyon to Glen Dochart & Loch Tay	Perth and Kinross/ Stirling	956.5	3,138	72.3	233	50	NN387351	MT,Sim
146	Little Pap	Lochnagar - Cac Carn Beag	07A: Braemar to Montrose	Aberdeenshire	956	3,136	22	72	44	NO264844	MT,sSim
147	Sròn Coire na h-Iolaire	Beinn Bheoil	04B: Loch Treig to Loch Ericht	Highland	956	3,136	71	233	42	NN513704	MT,Sim
148	Sgor Eilde Beag	Binnein Mor	04A: Fort William to Loch Treig & Loch Leven	Highland	955.7	3,135	32.6	107	41	NN219653	MT,Sim
149	Meall Dearg	Liathach - Mullach an Rathain	13A: Loch Torridon to Loch Maree	Highland	955	3,133	38	125	25	NG913579	MT,Sim
150	Meall an Fhuarain Mhòir	Beinn Fhada	11A: Loch Duich to Cannich	Highland	954.9	3,133	64.7	213	33	NG999196	MT,Sim
151	Tom a' Choinnich	Ben Wyvis - Glas Leathad Mor	15B: Loch Vaich to Moray Firth	Highland	954	3,130	89	292	20	NH463700	MT,Sim
152	Beinn Iutharn Bheag	Beinn Iutharn Mhor	06B: Pitlochry to Braemar & Blairgowrie	Aberdeenshire	953	3,127	105	344	43	NO065791	Hu,MT,Sim
153	Sàil Liath	An Teallach - Sgurr Fiona	14A: Loch Maree to Loch Broom	Highland	952.4	3,125	55.4	184	19	NH071824	MT,Sim
154	Beinn Fhada	Stob Coire Sgreamhach	03B: Loch Linnhe to Loch Etive	Highland	952	3,123	50	164	41	NN159540	MT,Sim
155	Toll Creagach West Top	Toll Creagach	11A: Loch Duich to Cannich	Highland	951	3,120	28	92	25	NH177275	MT,sSim
156	Sgurr a' Mhaoraich Beag	Sgurr a' Mhaoraich	10A: Glen Shiel to Loch Hourn and Loch Quoich	Highland	948	3,110	29	95	33	NG977067	MT,sSim
157	Sgurr Sgumain	Sgurr Alasdair	17B: Minginish and the Cuillin Hills	Highland	947.9	3,110	26.7	95	32	NG448206	MT,sSim
158	Creag Dubh	Carn nan Gobhar	12B: Killilan to Inverness	Highland	947	3,107	94	308	25	NH199350	MT,Sim,sHu
159	Sgorr Bhàn	Beinn a' Bheithir - Sgorr Dhearg	03B: Loch Linnhe to Loch Etive	Highland	947	3,107	46	151	41	NN062560	MT,Sim
160	A' Chìoch	A' Chraileag	11B: Glen Affric to Glen Moriston	Highland	946.6	3,106	31.1	102	34	NH108152	MT,Sim
161	An Cabar	Ben Wyvis - Glas Leathad Mor	15B: Loch Vaich to Moray Firth	Highland	946	3,104	15	49	20	NH450665	MT
162	Creag Leacach SW Top	Creag Leacach	07A: Braemar to Montrose	Angus, Scotland/Perth and Kinross	943.7	3,096	24	79	43	NO149741	MT,sSim
163	Càrn Bàn	Càrn Dearg	09B: Glen Albyn and the Monadh Liath	Highland	942.3	3,092	57.2	187	35	NH631031	MT,Sim
164	Càrn Cloich-mhuilinn	Beinn Bhrotain	08A: Cairngorms	Aberdeenshire	942	3,091	75	246	43	NN968906	MT,Sim
165	Meall Buidhe SE Top	Meall Buidhe	10B: Knoydart to Glen Kingie	Highland	942	3,091	30	98	33 40	NM852987	MT,Sim
166	Sgurr na Banachdich Central Top	Sgurr na Banachdich	17B: Minginish and the Cuillin Hills	Highland	942	3,091	24	79	32	NG441222	MT,sSim
167	Sgurr na Sgine NW Top	Sgurr na Sgine	10A: Glen Shiel to Loch Hourn and Loch Quoich	Highland	942	3,091	21	69	33	NG943115	MT,sSim
168	Am Bodach	Aonach Eagach - Meall Dearg	03A: Loch Leven to Rannoch Station	Highland	941.9	3,090	74.5	244	41	NN168580	MT,Sim
169	Stob a' Bhruaich Leith	Stob Ghabhar	03C: Glen Etive to Glen Lochy	Argyll and Bute/ Highland	941	3,087	42	138	50	NN208459	MT,Sim
170	Spidean Dhomhuill Bhric	The Saddle	10A: Glen Shiel to Loch Hourn and Loch Quoich	Highland	940.4	3,085	47.8	157	33	NG922129	MT,Sim
171	Beinn a' Chroin East Top	Beinn a' Chroin	01C: Loch Lomond to Strathyre	Stirling (council area)	940.1	3,084	63.1	207	50 56	NN393185	MT,Sim
172	Stob Coire Leith	Aonach Eagach - Sgorr nam Fiannaidh	03A: Loch Leven to Rannoch Station	Highland	939.5	3,082	61.7	202	41	NN149584	MT,Sim
173	Stob Coire Altruim	Buachaille Etive Mor - Stob na Broige	03B: Loch Linnhe to Loch Etive	Highland	938.8	3,080	35.4	116	41	NN197530	MT,Sim
174	An Socach East Top	An Socach	06B: Pitlochry to Braemar & Blairgowrie	Aberdeenshire	938	3,077	42	138	43	NO098805	MT,Sim
175	Sgurr Dubh an Da Bheinn	Sgurr Dubh Mor	17B: Minginish and the Cuillin Hills	Highland	938	3,077	52	171	32	NG455204	MT,Sim
176	Beinn Cheathaich	Meall Glas	02B: Glen Lyon to Glen Dochart & Loch Tay	Stirling (council area)	937.6	3,076	79	256	51	NN444326	MT,Sim
177	Toman Coinnich	A' Chailleach	14B: The Fannaichs	Highland	936.6	3,073	73.4	217	20	NH148713	MT,Sim
178	Luinne Bheinn East Top	Luinne Bheinn	10B: Knoydart to Glen Kingie	Highland	936	3,071	23	75	33	NG872006	MT,sSim
179	Sgurr a' Fionn Choire	Bruach na Frithe	17B: Minginish and the Cuillin Hills	Highland	936	3,071	31.7	104	32	NG464252	MT,Sim
180	Druim Shionnach West Top	Druim Shionnach	10A: Glen Shiel to Loch Hourn and Loch Quoich	Highland	935.4	3,069	38.6	135	33	NH062082	MT,Sim
181	East Meur Gorm Craig	Ben Avon - Leabaidh an Daimh Bhuidhe	08B: Cairngorms	Moray	935.3	3,069	22.1	72	36	NJ159042	MT,sSim
182	Sgurr an Tuill Bhain	Slioch	14A: Loch Maree to Loch Broom	Highland	934	3,064	56	184	19	NH018688	MT,Sim
183	Beinn Fhada NE Top	Stob Coire Sgreamhach	03B: Loch Linnhe to Loch Etive	Highland	931	3,054	55	180	41	NN164543	MT,Sim
184	Ben Vorlich North Top	Ben Vorlich	01D: Inveraray to Crianlarich	Argyll and Bute	931	3,054	27	89	50 56	NN294130	MT,sSim
185	Meall Cruidh	Ben Starav	03C: Glen Etive to Glen Lochy	Argyll and Bute	930	3,051	35	115	50	NN129415	MT,Sim
186	Sgor Choinnich	Sgor Gaibhre	04B: Loch Treig to Loch Ericht	Highland/ Perth and Kinross	929	3,048	127	417	42	NN443683	Hu,MT,Sim
187	Sgurr nan Saighead	Sgurr Fhuaran	11A: Loch Duich to Cannich	Highland	929	3,048	107.5	353	33	NG974177	Hu,MT,Sim
188	Am Fasarinen	Liathach - Mullach an Rathain	13A: Loch Torridon to Loch Maree	Highland	928.6	3,047	56.8	186	25	NG923574	MT,Sim
189	Beinn Sgritheall NW Top	Beinn Sgritheall	10A: Glen Shiel to Loch Hourn and Loch Quoich	Highland	928	3,045	26	85	33	NG834131	MT,sSim
190	Glas Leathad Beag	Ben Wyvis - Glas Leathad Mor	15B: Loch Vaich to Moray Firth	Highland	928	3,045	132	433	20	NH492706	Hu,MT,Sim
191	Glas Mheall Mor	A' Bhuidheanach Bheag	05B: Loch Ericht to Glen Tromie & Glen Garry	Perth and Kinross	927.9	3,044	69.2	227	42	NN680769	MT,Sim
192	Tigh Mor na Seilge (NNE Top)	Sail Chaorainn	11B: Glen Affric to Glen Moriston	Highland	927.4	3,043	39.5	125	34	NH140166	MT,Sim
193	Beinn Bhreac West Top	Beinn Bhreac	08B: Cairngorms	Aberdeenshire	927	3,041	20	66	36 43	NO052972	MT,sSim
194	Craig of Gowal	Cairn Bannoch	07A: Braemar to Montrose	Angus	927	3,041	23	75	44	NO231809	MT,sSim
195	Sron Chona Choirein	Stuchd an Lochain	02A: Loch Rannoch to Glen Lyon	Perth and Kinross	927	3,041	36	118	51	NN493445	MT,Sim
196	Bla Bheinn SW Top	Bla Bheinn	17B: Minginish and the Cuillin Hills	Highland	926.5	3,040	28.1	92	32	NG528215	MT,sSim
197	Sgurr Thormaid	Sgurr na Banachdich	17B: Minginish and the Cuillin Hills	Highland	926	3,038	38	125	32	NG441226	MT,Sim
198	Diollaid a' Chairn	Carn Dearg	04B: Loch Treig to Loch Ericht	Highland	925	3,035	38	125	42	NN487757	MT,Sim
199	An Sgorr	Carn Gorm	02A: Loch Rannoch to Glen Lyon	Perth and Kinross	924	3,031	73	240	42 51	NN640509	MT,Sim
200	Meall Glas Choire	Beinn Eibhinn	04B: Loch Treig to Loch Ericht	Highland	924	3,031	21	69	42	NN436727	MT,sSim
201	Carn Dearg SE Top	Carn Dearg	09B: Glen Albyn and the Monadh Liath	Highland	923.7	3,031	17.6	57	35	NH637017	MT
202	Beinn a' Chuirn	Beinn Mhanach	02A: Loch Rannoch to Glen Lyon	Argyll and Bute	923	3,028	74	243	50	NN360409	MT,Sim
203	Meall Gorm SE Top	Meall Gorm	14B: The Fannaichs	Highland	922.4	3,026	19.4	62	20	NH232691	MT
204	Meall Odhar	Glas Maol	07A: Braemar to Montrose	Aberdeenshire/ Perth and Kinross	922	3,025	15	49	43	NO155773	MT
205	Mullach Coire nan Nead	Beinn Eibhinn	04B: Loch Treig to Loch Ericht	Highland	922	3,025	39	128	42	NN430734	MT,Sim
206	Meall nan Tarmachan SE Top	Meall nan Tarmachan	02B: Glen Lyon to Glen Dochart & Loch Tay	Perth and Kinross	921.6	3,024	32.4	106	51	NN589385	MT,Sim
207	Meall Cuanail	Ben Cruachan	03C: Glen Etive to Glen Lochy	Argyll and Bute	920.2	3,019	94.5	310	50	NN069295	MT,Sim,sHu
208	Crow Craigies	Tolmount	07A: Braemar to Montrose	Angus	920	3,018	37	121	44	NO222798	MT,Sim
209	Geal-charn	Sgor Gaoith	08A: Cairngorms	Highland	920	3,018	54	177	35 36	NH884014	MT,Sim
210	Carn Ballach (SW Top)	Carn Dearg	09B: Glen Albyn and the Monadh Liath	Highland	919.8	3,018	48.7	160	35	NH643044	MT,Sim
211	Sgurr Leac nan Each	The Saddle	10A: Glen Shiel to Loch Hourn and Loch Quoich	Highland	918.9	3,015	65.6	217	33	NG917133	MT,Sim
212	Tom na Sroine	Aonach Mor	04A: Fort William to Loch Treig & Loch Leven	Highland	918.7	3,014	33.8	112	41	NN207745	MT,Sim
213	Carn Bhac SW Top	Carn Bhac	06B: Pitlochry to Braemar & Blairgowrie	Aberdeenshire/ Perth and Kinross	918.1	3,012	25.2	83	43	NO041827	MT,sSim
214	Stob an Duine Ruaidh	Ben Starav	03C: Glen Etive to Glen Lochy	Argyll and Bute	918	3,012	66	217	50	NN124409	MT,Sim
215	Stuc Fraoch Choire	Sgurr nan Ceathreamhnan	11A: Loch Duich to Cannich	Highland	918	3,012	36	118	25 33	NH052253	MT,Sim
216	Tom Dubh	Monadh Mor	08A: Cairngorms	Highland	918	3,012	40	131	36 43	NN921952	MT,Sim
217	Mullach nan Coirean South Top	Mullach nan Coirean	04A: Fort William to Loch Treig & Loch Leven	Highland	917.5	3,010	67.5	221	41	NN131654	MT,Sim
218	Meall a' Churain	Sgiath Chuil	02B: Glen Lyon to Glen Dochart & Loch Tay	Stirling (council area)	917.3	3,010	29.9	98	51	NN462324	MT,sSim
219	Basteir Tooth	Am Basteir	17B: Minginish and the Cuillin Hills	Highland	917.16	3,009	22	72	32	NG465252	MT,sSim
220	Carn Bhinnein	Carn a' Gheoidh	06B: Pitlochry to Braemar & Blairgowrie	Perth and Kinross	917	3,009	63	207	43	NO091762	MT,Sim
221	Stob Coire Lochan	Carn Eige	11A: Loch Duich to Cannich	Highland	916.9	3,008	29.6	97	25	NH119271	MT,sSim
222	Mullach nan Coirean East Top	Mullach nan Coirean	04A: Fort William to Loch Treig & Loch Leven	Highland	916.6	3,007	38.6	127	41	NN137655	MT,Sim
223	Stob Coire Dubh	Carn Liath	09C: Loch Lochy to Loch Laggan	Highland	916	3,005	31	102	34	NN496916	MT,Sim
224	Sgurr Dubh	Mullach Coire Mhic Fhearchair	14A: Loch Maree to Loch Broom	Highland	915.4	3,003	48.7	160	19	NH060729	MT,Sim
225	Stuc a' Choire Dhuibh Bhig	Liathach - Spidean a' Choire Leith	13A: Loch Torridon to Loch Maree	Highland	915.4	3,003	82.8	272	25	NG942582	MT,Sim
226	Carn na Caim South Top	Carn na Caim	05B: Loch Ericht to Glen Tromie & Glen Garry	Highland/ Perth and Kinross	914.6	3,001	30.4	100	42	NN663806	MT,Sim

== Bibliography ==
- Donald Bennet; Rab Anderson (2006). The Munros: Scottish Mountaineering Club Hillwalkers' Guide. Scottish Mountaineering Club. ISBN 978-0907521945.
- Sir Hugh T. Munro; Derek A. Bearhop (1997). Munro's Tables (Scottish Mountaineering Club District Guides). Scottish Mountaineering Club. ISBN 978-0907521532.

== DoBIH codes ==
The DoBIH uses the following codes for the various classifications of mountains and hills in the British Isles, which many of the above peaks also fall into:

- Ma Marilyn
- Hu HuMP
- Sim Simm
- 5 Dodd
- M Munro
- MT Munro Top
- F Furth
- C Corbett
- G Graham
- D Donald
- DT Donald Top
- Hew Hewitt
- N Nuttall
- Dew Dewey
- DDew Donald Dewey
- HF Highland Five
- 4 400-499m Tump
- 3 300-399m Tump (GB)
- 2 200-299m Tump (GB)
- 1 100-199m Tump (GB)
- 0 0-99m Tump (GB)
- W Wainwright
- WO Wainwright Outlying Fell
- B Birkett
- Sy Synge
- Fel Fellranger
- CoH County Top – Historic (pre-1974)
- CoA County Top – Administrative (1974 to mid-1990s)
- CoU County Top – Current County or Unitary Authority
- CoL County Top – Current London Borough
- SIB Significant Island of Britain
- Dil Dillon
- A Arderin
- VL Vandeleur-Lynam
- MDew Myrddyn Dewey
- O Other list (which includes):
  - Bin Binnion
  - Bg Bridge
  - BL Buxton & Lewis
  - Ca Carn
  - CT Corbett Top
  - GT Graham Top
  - Mur Murdo
  - P500 P500
  - P600 P600
- Un unclassified

prefixes:
- s sub
- x deleted

suffixes:
= twin

== See also ==
- Lists of mountains and hills in the British Isles
- List of Munros in Scotland by Section
- List of mountains of the British Isles by height
- Lists of mountains and hills in the British Isles
- Lists of mountains in Ireland
- List of Murdo mountains
- List of Corbett mountains
- List of Graham mountains
- List of Donald mountains
- List of Furth mountains in the British Isles
- List of P600 mountains in the British Isles
- List of Marilyns in the British Isles
