= Mullach Coire Mhic Fhearchair =

Mountain in Scotland

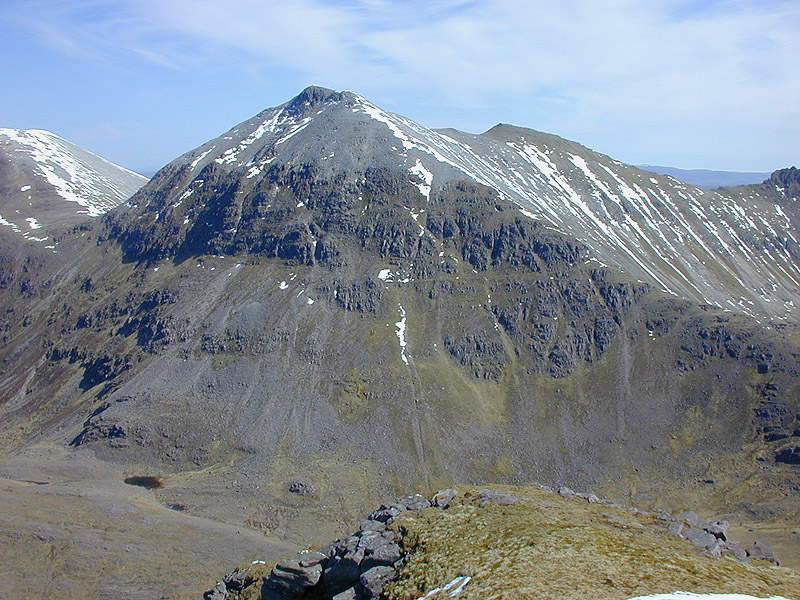
- Mullach Coire Mhic Fhearchair from Beinn Tarsuinn

Highest point
- Elevation: 1,015 m (3,330 ft)
- Prominence: 591 m (1,939 ft)
- Listing: Munro, Marilyn
- Coordinates: 57°42′32″N 5°16′17″W

Geography
- Location: Wester Ross, Scotland
- Parent range: Northwest Highlands
- OS grid: NH052734
- Topo map: OS Landranger 19

Mullach Coire Mhic Fhearchair (1,015 m) is a mountain in the Northwest Highlands of Wester Ross, Scotland. It lies in the remote Dundonnell and Fisherfield Forest.

The ridge is covered in large quartzite boulders, which makes it a difficult peak to climb. Some climbers will wildcamp next to nearby Loch Fhada before they ascend the mountain. The nearest village is Kinlochewe to the south.
