= Meall Buidhe =

Meall Buidhe, meaning yellow hill in Scottish Gaelic, is the name of a number of peaks in Scotland:

- Meall Buidhe, Knoydart (946 m), a Munro in the Knoydart area
- Meall Buidhe, Glen Lyon (932 m), a Munro on the north side of Glen Lyon
- Meall Buidhe (Corbett) (910 m), a Corbett at the head of Glen Lyon
- Meall Buidhe, Glen Ogle (719 m), a Marilyn on the east side of Glen Ogle
