= Am Faochagach =

Mountain in Scotland

Coordinates: 57°46′21″N 04°51′14″W

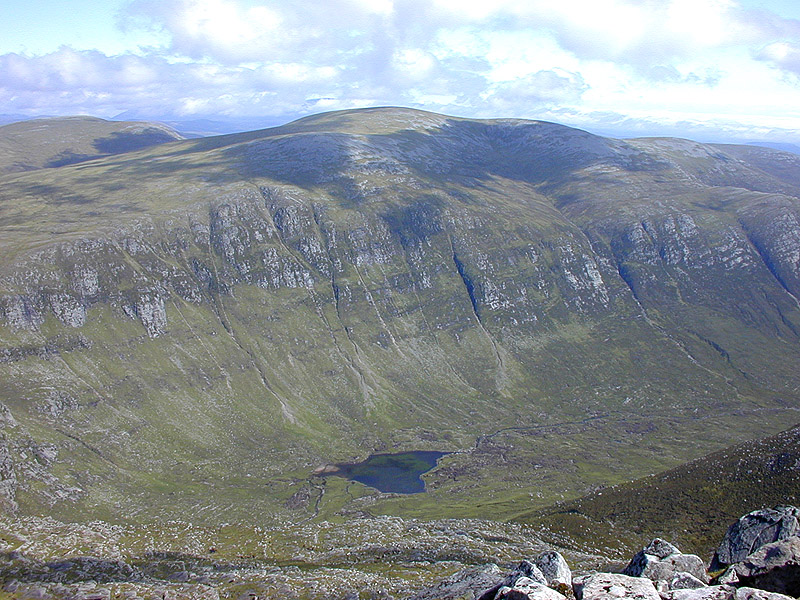
- Am Faochagach as seen from Cona' Mheall

Highest point
- Elevation: 953 m (3,127 ft)
- Prominence: 367 m (1,204 ft)
- Listing: Munro, Marilyn

Geography
- Location: Wester Ross, Scotland
- Parent range: Northwest Highlands
- OS grid: NH303793
- Topo map: OS Landranger 20

Am Faochagach (953 m) is a mountain in the Northwest Highlands of Scotland. It is located in Wester Ross, north of the main road to Ullapool.

A rounded peak, it is surrounded by moorland and bogs, and a river crossing, which makes the approach to the mountain difficult from the road. However, the ascent itself is simpler.
