= Beinn Tarsuinn =

Several Scottish mountains bear the name Beinn Tarsuinn including:

- Beinn Tarsuinn (Munro) (937 m), a Munro
- Beinn Tarsuinn (Corbett) (826 m), a Corbett on the Isle of Arran
