= Meall Chuaich =

Mountain in Grampian Mountains of Scotland

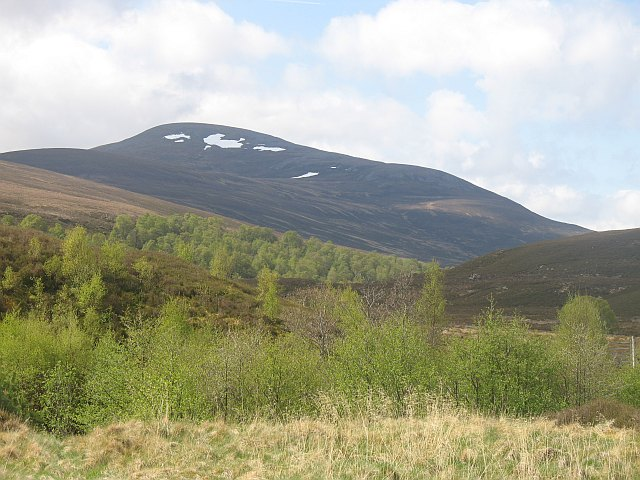
- Meall Chuaich

Highest point
- Elevation: 951 m (3,120 ft)
- Prominence: 466 m (1,529 ft)
- Listing: Munro, Marilyn
- Coordinates: 56°57′50″N 4°06′45″W

Geography
- Location: Highland, Scotland
- Parent range: Grampian Mountains
- OS grid: NN716878
- Topo map: OS Landranger 42

Meall Chuaich (951 m) is a mountain in the Grampian Mountains of Scotland, located east of the village of Dalwhinnie.

Although the mountain lacks any distinctive features, it still offers good views from its summit towards Badenoch and Strathspey in the north. One of the easier Munros to climb, walks usually begin at the A9, where there is a lay-by at the start.
