= Beinn a' Chlachair =

Mountain in Scotland

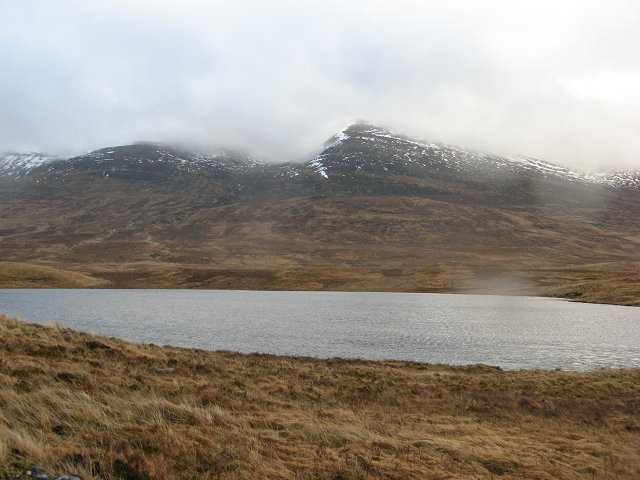
- Beinn a' Chlachair from the Allt Meall Ardruighe reservoir

Highest point
- Elevation: 1,087 m (3,566 ft)
- Prominence: 539 m (1,768 ft)
- Listing: Munro, Marilyn
- Coordinates: 56°52′10″N 4°30′35″W

Geography
- Location: Highland, Scotland
- Parent range: Grampian Mountains
- OS grid: NN471781
- Topo map: OS Landranger 42

Beinn a' Chlachair (1,087 m) is a mountain in the Grampian Mountains of Scotland. It lies south of Loch Laggan, near the remote hamlet of Kinloch Laggan.

The highest of a group of three Munros, the mountain has a spacious plateau on its summit, while three of sides are steep. There is a corrie on its northern face.
