= Toll Creagach =

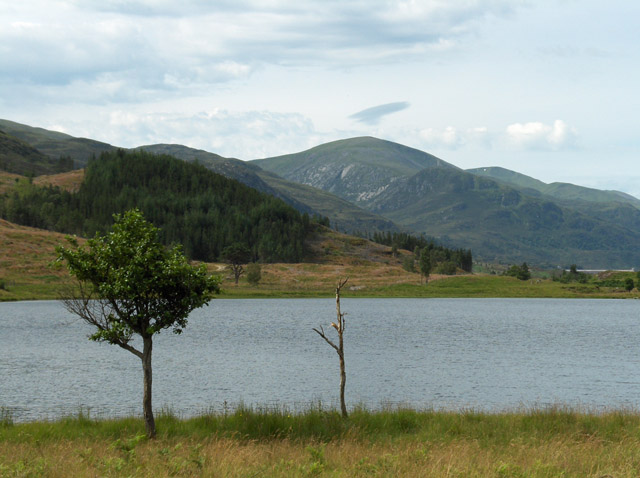
- Toll Creagach (centre)

Highest point
- Elevation: 1,054 m (3,458 ft)
- Prominence: 182 m (597 ft)
- Listing: Munro, Marilyn
- Coordinates: 57°18′33″N 4°59′58″W

Geography
- Location: Inverness-shire, Scotland
- Parent range: Northwest Highlands
- OS grid: NH194282
- Topo map: OS Landranger 25

Toll Creagach (1,054 m) is a mountain in the Northwest Highlands of Scotland. It lies between Glen Affric in the south and Loch Mullardoch in Inverness-shire.

A domed shape mountain with corries on its slopes, it is usually climbed from the Affric side. The nearest village is Cannich to the east.
