= Broad Cairn =

Coordinates: 56°55′N 3°15′W

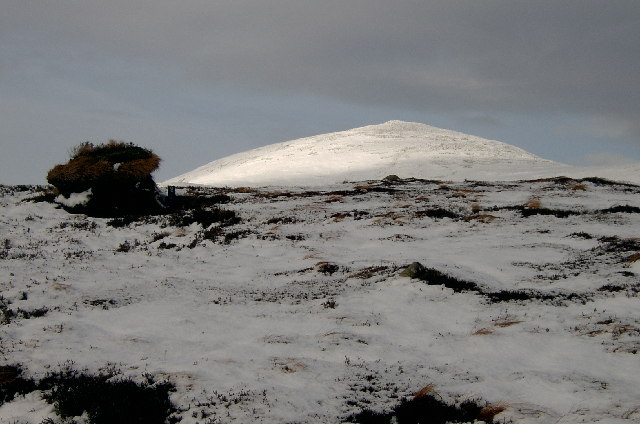
- Broad Cairn in the snow.

Highest point
- Elevation: 998 m (3,274 ft)
- Prominence: 64 m (210 ft)
- Parent peak: Cairn Bannoch
- Listing: Munro

Naming
- English translation: Broad Hill

Geography
- Location: Aberdeenshire, Scotland
- Parent range: Grampian Mountains

Climbing
- Easiest route: Walk

Broad Cairn is a mountain in the Grampians of Scotland, located about 16 mi (26 km) south of the River Dee near Balmoral.

It has an elevation of 998 m (3,274 ft) and a prominence of 64 m (210 ft) and is a Munro.
