= Beinn na Lap =

Mountain in Highland, Scotland

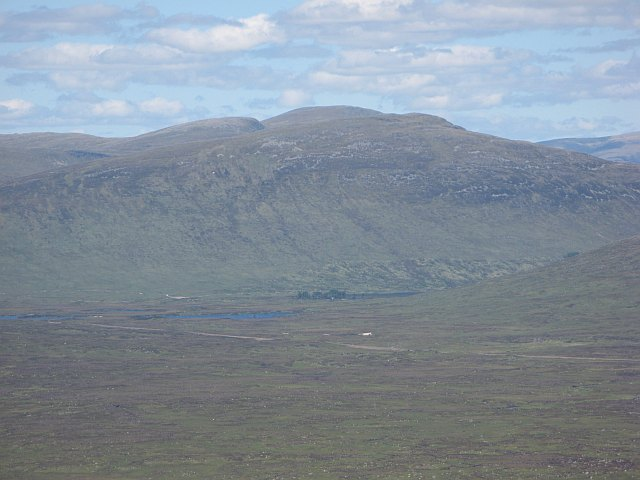
- Beinn na Lap as seen from Rannoch Moor

Highest point
- Elevation: 935 m (3,068 ft)
- Prominence: 406 m (1,332 ft)
- Listing: Munro, Marilyn
- Coordinates: 56°47′22″N 4°39′36″W

Geography
- Location: Highland, Scotland
- Parent range: Grampian Mountains
- OS grid: NN376695
- Topo map: OS Landranger 41

Beinn na Lap (935 m) is a mountain in the Grampian Mountains of Scotland. It lies at the northern end of Rannoch Moor, near to Corrour railway station.

A rounded mountain, the ascent from Corrour Station is quite straightforward and short, making it one of the easier Munros to climb.
