= Sgor Gaibhre =

Mountain in the Grampian range, Highland, Scotland

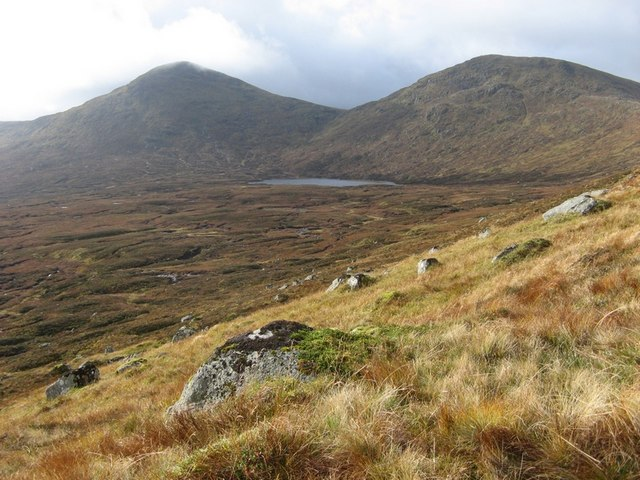
- Sgor Gaibhre (left)

Highest point
- Elevation: 955 m (3,133 ft)
- Prominence: 300 m (980 ft)
- Listing: Munro, Marilyn
- Coordinates: 56°46′21″N 4°32′47″W

Geography
- Location: Highland / Perth and Kinross, Scotland
- Parent range: Grampian Mountains
- OS grid: NN444674
- Topo map: OS Landranger 42

Sgor Gaibhre (955 m) is a mountain in the Grampian Mountains of Scotland. It lies on the border of Highland and Perth and Kinross, near Loch Ossian.

A remote mountain in the heart of the Grampians, it is usually climbed from either Rannoch Moor to the west or Corrour railway station.
