= A' Ghlas-bheinn =

Mountain in Scotland

Coordinates: 57°15′21″N 5°18′14″W

A' Ghlas-bhienn
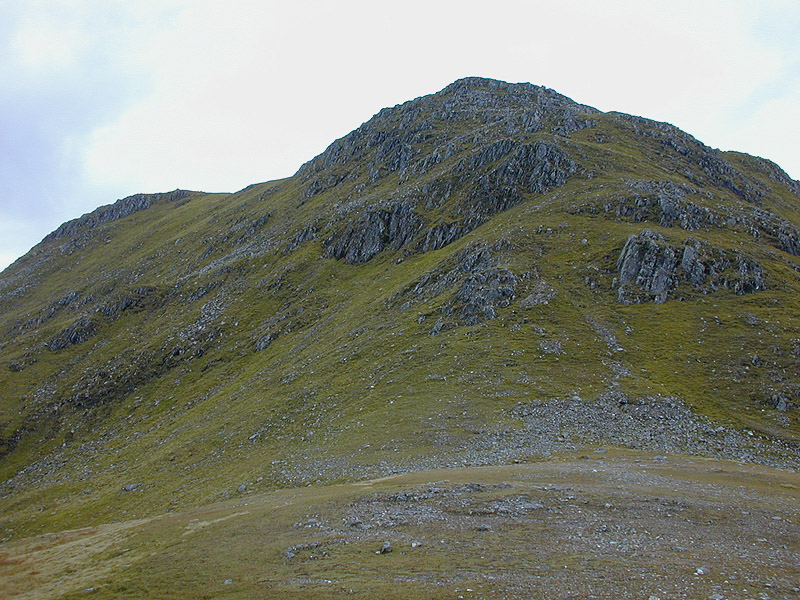
- The summit of A' Ghlas-bhienn

Highest point
- Elevation: 918 m (3,012 ft)
- Prominence: 407 m (1,335 ft)
- Listing: Munro, Marilyn

Geography
- Location within Highland
- Location: Ross and Cromarty, Scotland
- Parent range: Northwest Highlands
- OS grid: NH008230
- Topo map: OS Landranger 25 33

A' Ghlas-bhienn (918 m) is a mountain in the Northwest Highlands of Scotland. It lies in the Kintail area of Ross-shire, close to the settlement of Morvich.

A rocky peak, its ascent can be done in conjunction with the Falls of Glomach.
