= Geal Charn (Loch Laggan) =

Mountain in Highland, Scotland, UK

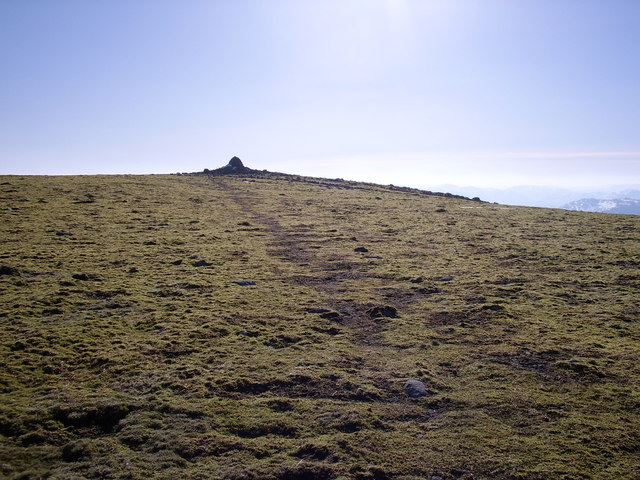
- The summit of Geal Charn, showing its distinctive summit cone

Highest point
- Elevation: 1,049 m (3,442 ft)
- Prominence: 310 m (1,020 ft)
- Listing: Munro, Marilyn
- Coordinates: 56°53′52″N 4°27′26″W

Geography
- Location: Highland
- Parent range: Grampian Mountains
- OS grid: NN504811
- Topo map: OS Landranger 42

Geal Charn (1,049 m) is a mountain in the Grampian Mountains of Scotland. It is situated in the Highlands, on the southern shore of Loch Laggan.

A large and sprawling mountain, its most notable feature is its fine and distinctive summit cone. The nearest settlement is Kinloch Laggan.
