= Beinn Dearg (Blair Atholl) =

Munro Mountain north of Blair Atholl

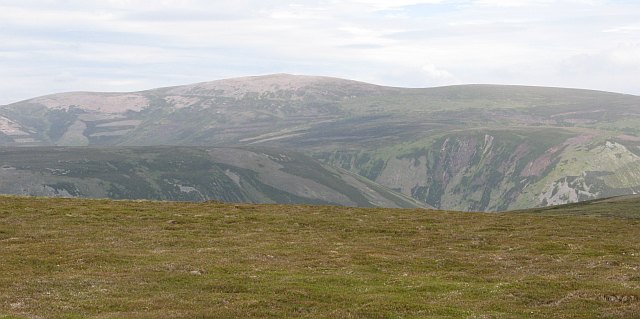
- Beinn Dearg

Highest point
- Elevation: 1,009 m (3,310 ft)
- Prominence: 473 m (1,552 ft)
- Listing: Munro, Marilyn
- Coordinates: 56°52′38″N 3°53′01″W

Geography
- Location: Perth and Kinross, Scotland
- Parent range: Grampian Mountains
- OS grid: NN852777
- Topo map: OS Landranger 43

Beinn Dearg (1,009 m) is a mountain in the Grampian Mountains of Scotland. It lies north of the Perth and Kinross village of Blair Atholl, in the Forest of Atholl.

It makes for a long but straightforward hill walk in the summer months and the views are extensive from its summit.
