= Càrn na Caim =

Mountain in Scotland

Carn na Caim
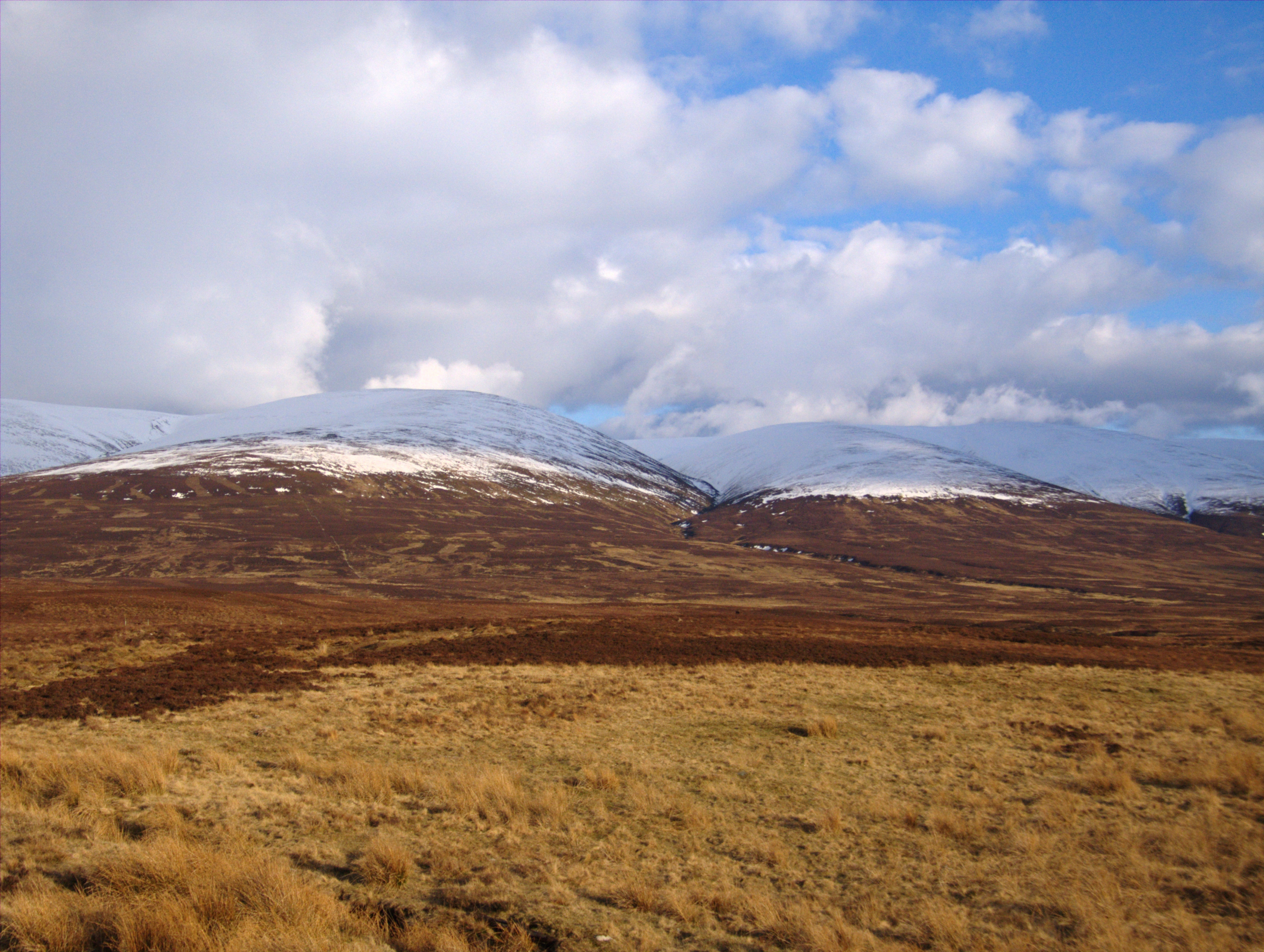
- Carn na Caim

Highest point
- Elevation: 941 m (3,087 ft)
- Prominence: 327 m (1,073 ft)
- Listing: Munro, Marilyn
- Coordinates: 56°54′42″N 4°10′28″W

Geography
- Location: Highland / Perth and Kinross, Scotland
- Parent range: Grampian Mountains
- OS grid: NN677821
- Topo map: OS Landranger 42

Carn na Caim (941 m) is a mountain in the Grampian Mountains of Scotland. It lies on the border of Highland and Perth and Kinross, east of the Pass of Drumochter.

Located on a high plateau, Carn na Caim is the higher of the two Munros above the Pass. The climb to the summit is soggy in many places around the peak, but the views from the top are fine.
