= An Sgarsoch =

Coordinates: 56°55′58″N 03°45′16″W

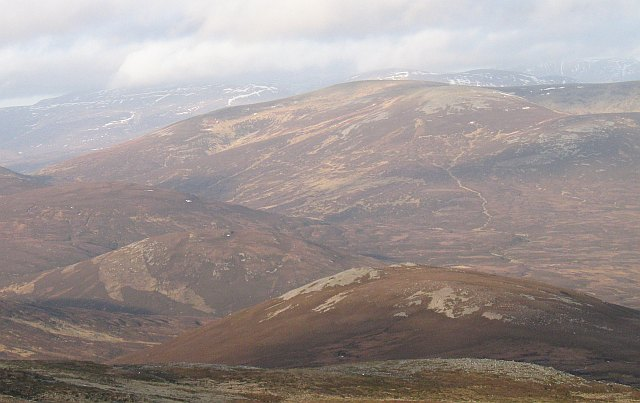
- An Sgarsoch (centre) with the huge Braeriach looming over it in the distance

Highest point
- Elevation: 1,006.5 m (3,302 ft)
- Prominence: 319 m (1,047 ft)
- Listing: Munro, Marilyn

Geography
- Location: Aberdeenshire / Perth and Kinross, Scotland
- Parent range: Grampian Mountains
- OS grid: NN933836
- Topo map: OS Landranger 43

An Sgarsoch (1,006.5m) is a mountain in the Grampian Mountains of Scotland. It lies north of Blair Atholl in a very remote part of the Highlands, on the border of Aberdeenshire and Perthshire.

Rounded and unspectacular, An Sgarsoch is noted mainly for its isolation, situated where it is between the Cairngorms and the Mounth, miles away from any villages or towns. The most common approach to the mountain is from the upper reaches of the River Dee.
