= Càrn Bhac =

Mountain in Scotland

Carn Bhac
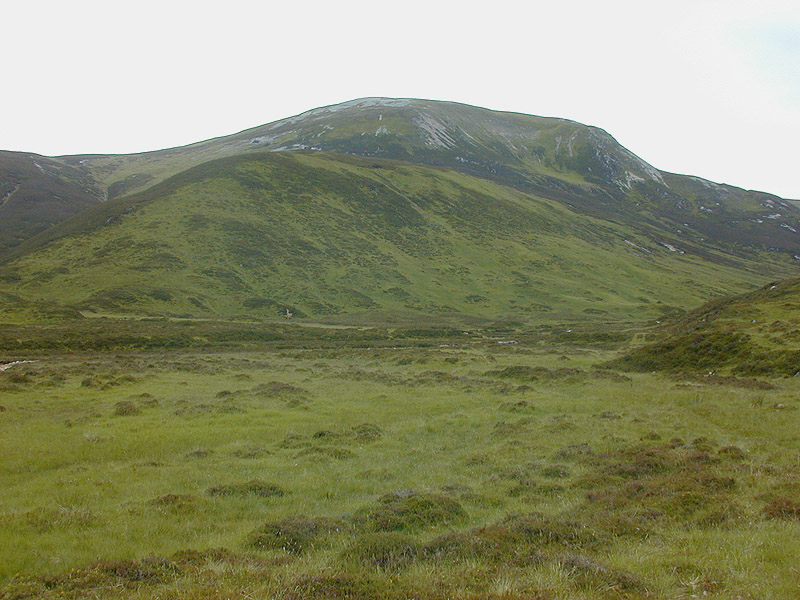
- Carn Bhac

Highest point
- Elevation: 945 m (3,100 ft)
- Prominence: 187 m (614 ft)
- Listing: Munro, Marilyn
- Coordinates: 56°55′50″N 3°33′39″W

Geography
- Location: Aberdeenshire, Scotland
- Parent range: Grampian Mountains
- OS grid: NO051832
- Topo map: OS Landranger 43

Carn Bhac (945 m) is a mountain in the Grampian Mountains of Scotland. It lies south west of the village of Inverey in Aberdeenshire, in the southern Mounth area.

One of quieter peaks in the area, it offers a great chance for solitude and reflection. Climbs usually start from Inverey.
