= Cona' Mheall =

Mountain in Scotland

Coordinates: 57.791077°N 4.903418°W

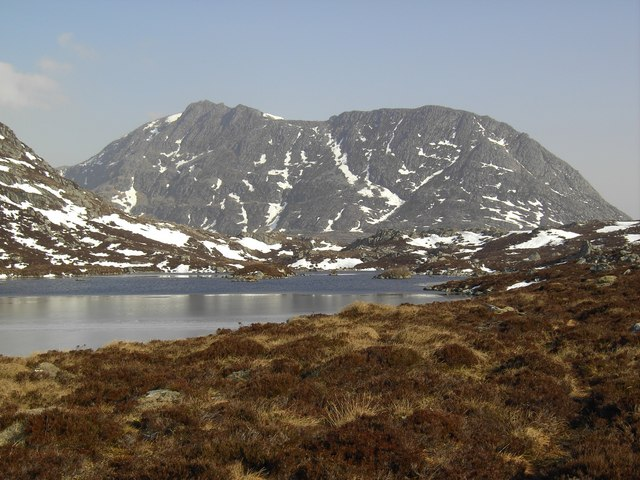
- Cona' Mheall

Highest point
- Elevation: 978 m (3,209 ft)
- Prominence: 165 m (541 ft)
- Listing: Munro, Marilyn

Geography
- Location: Wester Ross, Scotland
- Parent range: Northwest Highlands
- OS grid: NH275816
- Topo map: OS Landranger 20

Cona' Mheall (978 m) is a mountain in the Northwest Highlands of Scotland. It is located near Ullapool in Wester Ross.

Taking the form of a fine rocky ridge, it lies in the east of the Beinn Dearg range and offers excellent views from its summit. It is usually climbed as part of the Beinn Dearg summit although an alternative, but trickier, route starts from the A835 to the south.
