= An Socach (Glen Ey) =

Scottish mountain

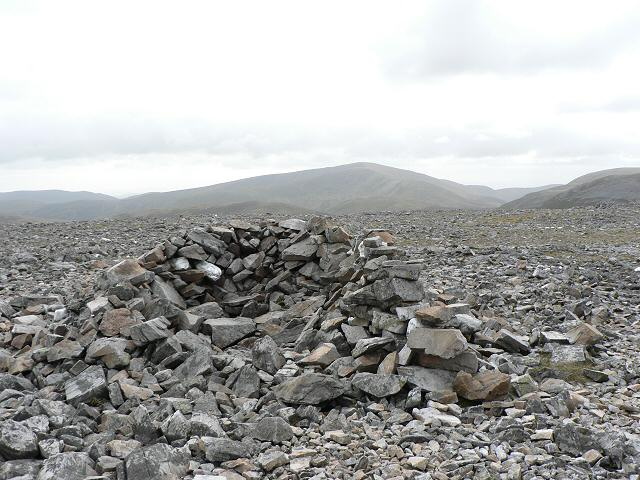

Highest point
- Elevation: 944 m (3,097 ft)
- Prominence: 188 m (617 ft)
- Listing: Munro, Marilyn
- Coordinates: 56°54′05″N 3°30′50″W

Naming
- English translation: The projecting place
- Language of name: Gaelic
- Pronunciation: Scottish Gaelic: [ən̪ˠˈs̪t̪ɔxkəx]

Geography
- Location: Aberdeenshire, Scotland
- Parent range: Grampian Mountains
- OS grid: NO079799
- Topo map: OS Landranger 43

An Socach is a Scottish mountain situated some three miles (5 km) west of the A93 road from Perth to Braemar. It is located at grid ref. 080800 on Ordnance Survey sheet 43. The summit altitude is 944 m (3,097 ft). The name may derive from the Gaelic Soc, meaning the snout or beak, leading to the projecting place by analogy with the shape of a snout. Other sources state that it in fact means 'the sow'.

The hill has an elongated, round form, and the Munro bagger is advised that the highest top is in fact at its western end and is not the 938 m (3,077 ft) eastern summit as shown on certain OS maps. The hill may be climbed from Glen Ey to the north or from the top of the Glenshee Ski Centre to the east. The Glenshee route involves a descent into Baddoch Burn, and so more climbing is required than the Glen Ey route, which is longer.
