= Meall nan Eun (Munro) =

Mountain in Argyll and Bute, Scotland

Coordinates: 56.561°N 4.945°W

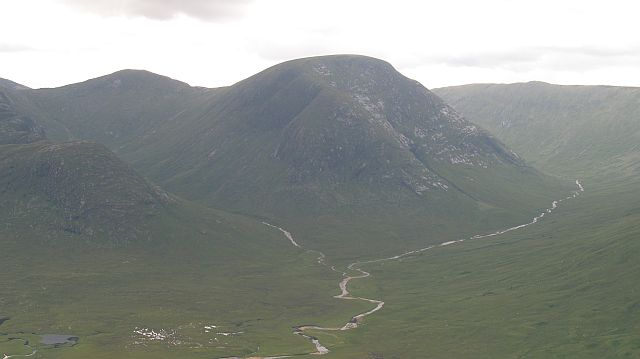
- Meall nan Eun

Highest point
- Elevation: 928 m (3,045 ft)
- Prominence: 174 m (571 ft)
- Listing: Munro, Marilyn

Geography
- Location: Argyll and Bute, Scotland
- Parent range: Grampian Mountains
- OS grid: NN192449
- Topo map: OS Landranger 50

Meall nan Eun (928.1 m) is a mountain in the Grampian Mountains of Scotland. It is located east of Glen Etive in Argyll and Bute.

A dome like mountain with a rounded top but steep sides, it has a summit plateau. Climbs usually start from Glen Etive and the peak is often climbed together with the nearby Munro Stob Coir'an Albannaich.
