= Creag nan Damh =

Mountain in the Scottish Highlands

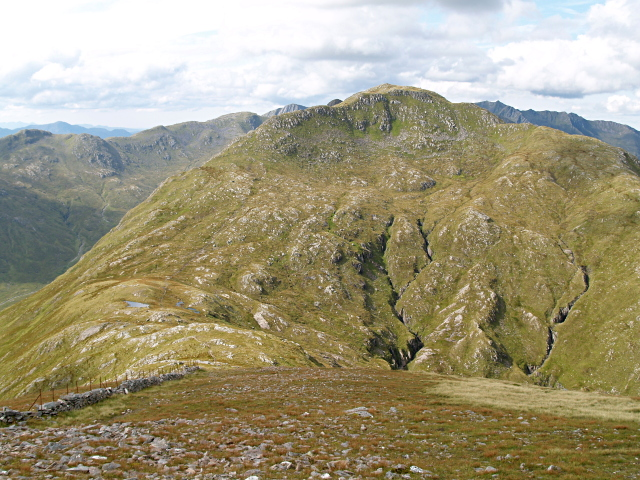
- Creag nan Damh

Highest point
- Elevation: 918 m (3,012 ft)
- Prominence: 189 m (620 ft)
- Listing: Munro, Marilyn
- Coordinates: 57°08′51″N 5°20′05″W

Geography
- Location: Highland, Scotland
- Parent range: Northwest Highlands
- OS grid: NG983111
- Topo map: OS Landranger 33

Creag nan Damh (Scottish Gaelic for 'rocky hill of the stag') is a mountain with a height of 918 metres (3,012 ft) in the Northwest Highlands of Scotland. It lies south of Glen Shiel, near Kinloch Hourn. A rocky and craggy peak, it is usually the last Munro to be climbed.
