= Stob Garbh =

Coordinates: 57°18′22″N 4°27′32″W

Highest point
- Elevation: 959 m (3,146 ft)
- Prominence: 104 m (341 ft)
- Parent peak: Cruach Ardrain
- Listing: Munro Top

Naming
- English translation: Rough Peak
- Language of name: Gaelic

Geography
- Location: Stirlingshire, Scotland
- Parent range: Grampians
- OS grid: NN411221
- Topo map: OS Landranger 51, 56 OS Explorer 364

Climbing
- Easiest route: Hike

Stob Garbh is a mountain in the Scottish Highlands, part of the Grampian Mountains. It is a Munro top located in the Breadalbane area of Loch Lomond and the Trossachs National Park.

The mountain is 957.7 metres (3,142 ft 1 in) high. It is the 439th highest peak in the British Isles and the 419th tallest in Scotland. It has a cairn located at the peak, and is closest to the town of Alexandria, West Dunbartonshire.
