= Beinn Bheoil =

Mountain in Highland, Scotland

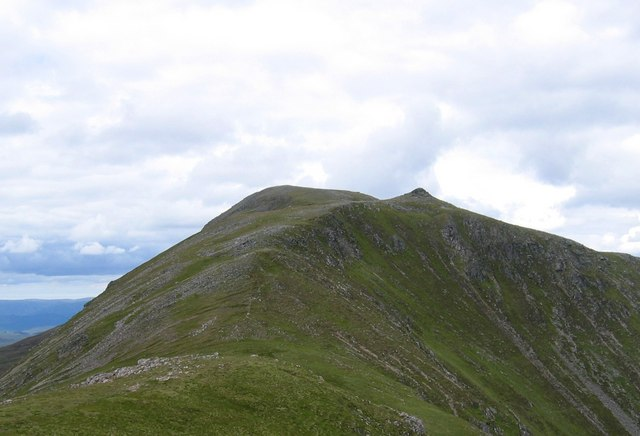
- Beinn Bheoil summit

Highest point
- Elevation: 1,019 m (3,343 ft)
- Prominence: 186 m (610 ft)
- Listing: Munro, Marilyn
- Coordinates: 56°48′48″N 4°25′51″W

Geography
- Location: Highland, Scotland
- Parent range: Grampian Mountains
- OS grid: NN517717
- Topo map: OS Landranger 42

Beinn Bheoil (1,019 m) is a mountain in the Grampian Mountains of Scotland, located on the western shore of Loch Ericht in Highland.

Taking the form of a ridge, the peak is usually climbed in conjunction with its neighbour Ben Alder. The nearest village is Dalwhinnie in the northeast.
