= Sgòr Gaoith =

Mountain in Scotland

Coordinates: 57.068484°N 3.810029°W

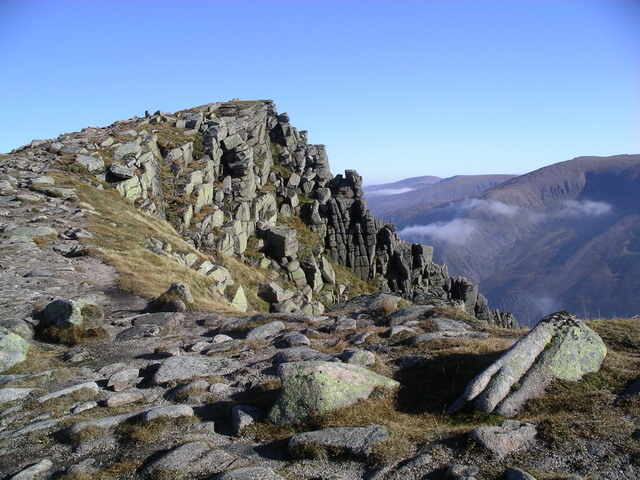
- The summit of Sgòr Gaoith

Highest point
- Elevation: 1,118 m (3,668 ft)
- Prominence: 242 m (794 ft)
- Parent peak: Braeriach
- Listing: Marilyn, Munro

Naming
- English translation: windy peak
- Language of name: Gaelic
- Pronunciation: Scottish Gaelic: [ˈs̪kɔɾ ˈkɤj]

Geography
- Location: Cairngorms, Scotland
- OS grid: NN903989
- Topo map: OS Landranger 36, 43

Geology
- Mountain type: Granite

Sgòr Gaoith (Scottish Gaelic: Sgòr Gaoithe, 'windy peak') is a mountain peak in the far western massif of the Cairngorms in the Scottish Highlands. It is 1,118 metres (3,668 ft) high, and is the highest point on a long north-south ridge. The ridge is separated from the Braeriach massif to the east by Gleann Eanaich and Loch Eanaich.

The name 'Sgòr Gaoith' also refers to the mountain as a whole. The other summits of the mountain are Sgòran Dubh Mòr (1,111 m high) to the north, and Càrn Bàn Mòr (1052 m high) to the south. The eastern side of Sgòr Gaoith is girded by steep cliffs which plunge down to Loch Eanaich; the western side is composed of heather slopes and a number of shallow corries.

The two most commonly used routes up Sgòr Gaoith start from Glen Feshie to the west. One ascends the mountain via a track starting in the pine woods, leading up into Coire Ruadh and thence to the summit by a number of indistinct paths. The other starts further south down Glen Feshie from a car-park just before the farm of Achlean and reaches the summit via the lower peak of Carn Ban Mòr (1,052 m).
