= Meall Buidhe, Knoydart =

Mountain in Scotland

Meall Bhuidhe
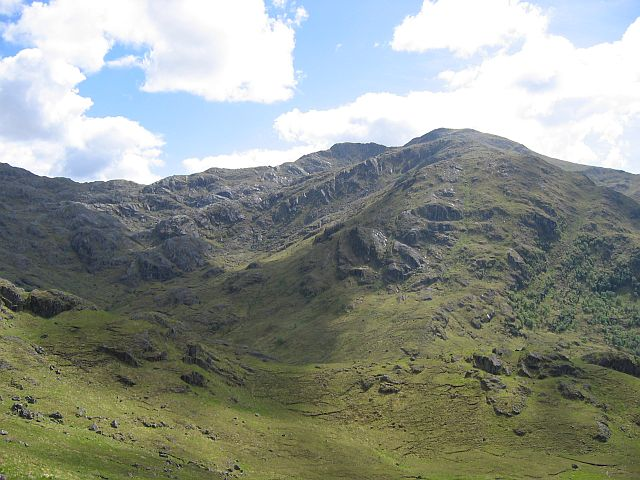
- Meall Bhuidhe

Highest point
- Elevation: 946 m (3,104 ft)
- Prominence: 496 m (1,627 ft)
- Listing: Munro, Marilyn
- Coordinates: 57°01′54″N 5°32′47″W

Geography
- Location: Lochaber, Scotland
- Parent range: Northwest Highlands
- OS grid: NM849989
- Topo map: OS Landranger 33, 40

Meall Buidhe (946 m) is a mountain in the Northwest Highlands, Scotland. It lies on the Knoydart peninsula in Lochaber.

A rocky mountain, Meall Buidhe is one of three Munros on Knoydart, and presents a challenging peak to climb from all directions. The nearest village is Inverie.
