= Ruadh Stac Mor =

Mountain is Scotland, United Kingdom

- An Ruadh-Stac Mòr
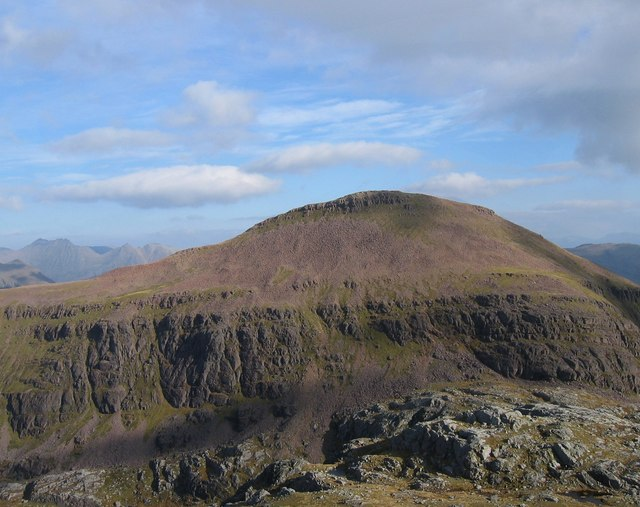

Highest point
- Elevation: 919 m (3,015 ft)
- Prominence: 167 m (548 ft)
- Listing: Munro, Marilyn
- Coordinates: 57°43′36″N 5°19′45″W

Naming
- English translation: great red stack
- Language of name: Scottish Gaelic

Geography
- Location: Wester Ross, Scotland
- Parent range: Northwest Highlands
- OS grid: NH018756
- Topo map: OS Landranger 19

Ruadh Stac Mor or Ruadh-Stac Mòr (Gaelic) is a mountain with a height of 919 metres (3,015 ft) in the Northwest Highlands of Scotland. It is located in the Dundonnell and Fisherfield Forest in Wester Ross.

One of the remotest Munros in Scotland, it provides superb views from its summit. Climbs generally start from the village of Poolewe to the west.
