= Beinn Tarsuinn (Munro) =

Mountain in Scotland

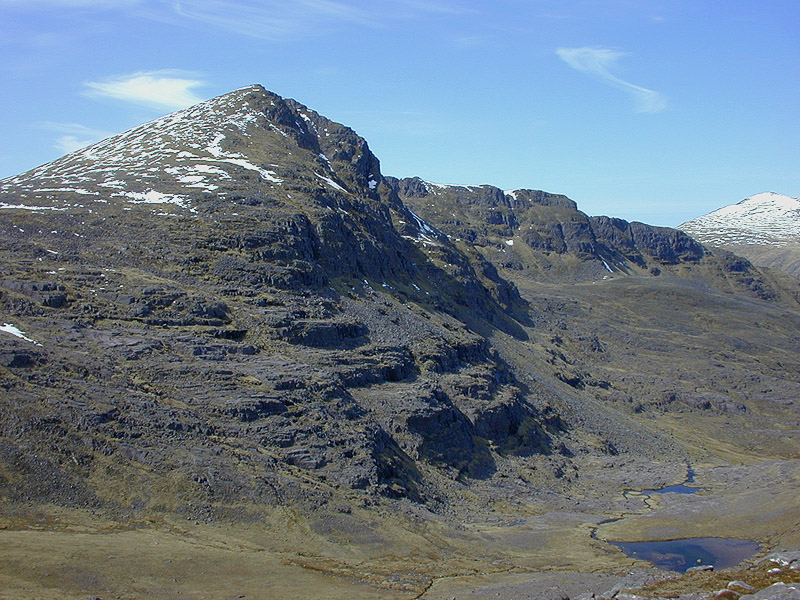
- Beinn Tarsuinn

Highest point
- Elevation: 934 m (3,064 ft)
- Prominence: 207 m (679 ft)
- Listing: Munro, Marilyn
- Coordinates: 57°42′07″N 5°17′30″W

Geography
- Location: Wester Ross, Scotland
- Parent range: Northwest Highlands
- OS grid: NH039727
- Topo map: OS Landranger 19

Beinn Tarsuinn (934 m) is a mountain in the Northwest Highlands of Wester Ross, Scotland. It lies in the heart of the remote Dundonnell and Fisherfield Forest.

The climb to the summit can either start from the south at Kinlochewe, or from the north which takes in all the Fisherfield Munros.
