= Cairn Bannoch =

- Càrn a' Bheannaich
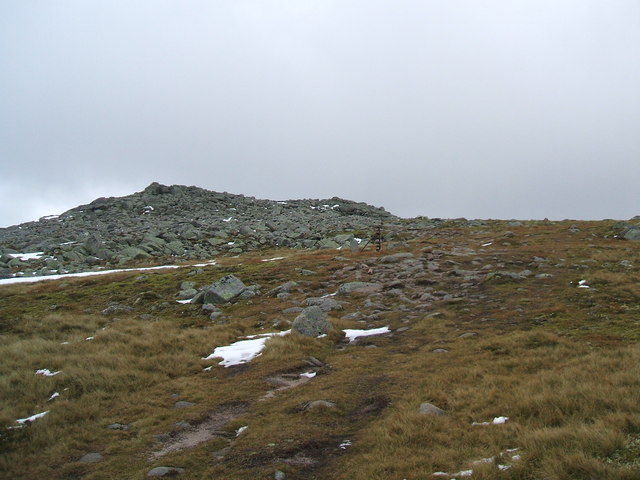
- The summit of Cairn Bannoch

Highest point
- Elevation: 1,012 m (3,320 ft)
- Prominence: 77 m (253 ft)
- Parent peak: Carn an t-Sagairt Mòr
- Listing: Munro
- Coordinates: 56°55′39″N 3°16′42″W

Geography
- Parent range: Grampian Mountains

Climbing
- Easiest route: Walk

Cairn Bannoch (Scottish Gaelic: Càrn a' Bheannaich) is a mountain in the White Mounth, a mountainous plateau in the Scottish Highlands. It is about seventeen miles south of the River Dee near Balmoral.
