= List of Murdo mountains =

Scottish peaks above 3000 ft with 30 m prominence

Murdo
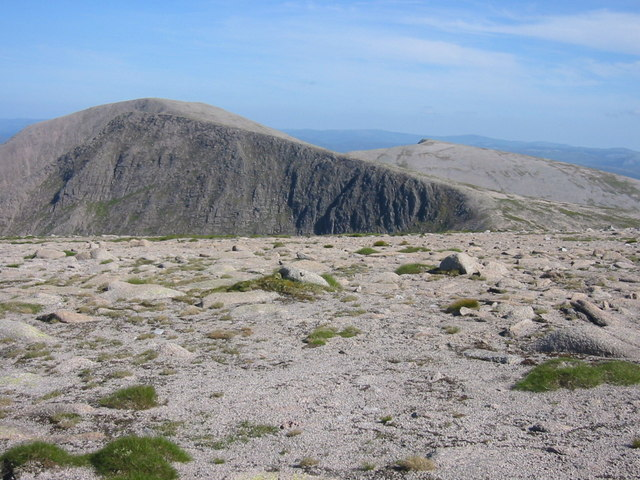
- Carn na Criche on the Braeriach Plateau, the highest Murdo that is not classed as a Munro

Highest point
- Elevation: over 3,000 ft (914 m)
- Prominence: over 30 m (98 ft)

Geography
- Location: 442 Scotland

This is a list of Murdo mountains in Scotland by height. Murdos are Scottish mountains over 3,000 feet (914.4 m) in height and with a prominence over 30 metres (98 ft); a mix of imperial and metric thresholds.

Cartographer Alan Dawson first compiled the list of Murdos in 1995 to provide an objective and quantitative alternative to the Scottish Mountaineering Club ("SMC") definition of a Munro, which has the same height threshold but a qualitative requirement of "sufficient separation", instead of prominence. The SMC does not maintain an official list of Murdos, unlike all its other Scottish mountain and hill classifications, . However, all Murdos are either SMC Munros or SMC Munro Tops. Dawson's threshold was in line with the 1994 International Climbing and Mountaineering Federation declaration that an "independent peak" had to have a prominence of over 30 metres (98 ft).

As of October 2018, there were 442 Murdos identified in Scotland. Most definitions of mountains in the British Isles consider peaks with a prominence between 30–150 metres (98–492 ft) as being "tops", and not mountains. A total of 203 of the 442 Murdos exceed this 150 metres (492 ft) prominence threshold, and thus are Marilyns. Of these, 54 exceed the P600 prominence threshold of 600 metres (1,969 ft) to be a "major" mountain.

When Dawson created the Murdos in 1995 he said "all Munros are Murdos", and listed Maoile Lunndaidh, a Munro, with a prominence of 400 metres (1,312 ft). Surveys in 2014 showed Maoile Lunndaidh was lower than Creag Toll a' Choin, and its prominence was 11 metres (36 ft); databases of Murdos (e.g. the DoBIH), no longer list Maoile Lunndaidh as a Murdo (its prominence went to Creag Toll a' Choin), and thus not all Munros are Murdos. (Note: Thus almost all Munros are also Murdos; however, many climbers reject the official prominence figure of 11 m for Maoile Lunndaidh as it is based on a summit cairn on top of a large massif, which has a prominence of over 400 m, and thus state that all Munros are in fact Murdos.)

== Murdo mountains by height ==
The list below was downloaded from the Database of British and Irish Hills ("DoBIH") as at October 2018. (Note: The Database of British and Irish Hills ("DoBIH") is the most referenced database for the classification of peaks in the British Isles, and the DoBIH is licensed under a "Creative Commons Attribution 3.0 Unported License".) Note that topological prominence, unlike topological elevation, is far more complex to measure and requires a survey of the entire contours of a peak, rather than a single point of height. These tables are therefore subject to being revised over time, and should not be amended or updated unless the entire DoBIH data is re–downloaded again. The DoBIH classification marks Munros ("M") and Munro Tops ("MT").

Murdos, ranked by height (DoBIH, October 2018)
Height Rank	Name	Section / Region	County	Height (m)	Prom. (m)	Height (ft)	Prom. (ft)	Topo Map	OS Grid Reference	Classification (§ DoBIH codes)
1	Ben Nevis	04A: Fort William to Loch Treig & Loch Leven	Highland	1,345	1,345	4,411	4,411	41	NN166712	Ma,M,Sim,CoH,CoU,CoA,SIB
2	Ben Macdui	08A: Cairngorms	Aberdeenshire/ Moray	1,309	950	4,295	3,117	36 43	NN988989	Ma,M,Sim,CoH,CoU,CoA
3	Braeriach	08A: Cairngorms	Aberdeenshire/ Highland	1,296	461	4,252	1,512	36 43	NN953999	Ma,M,Sim
4	Cairn Toul	08A: Cairngorms	Aberdeenshire	1,291	166	4,236	545	36 43	NN963972	Ma,M,Sim
5	Càrn na Crìche	08A: Cairngorms	Aberdeenshire	1,265	50	4,150	164	36 43	NN939982	MT,Sim
6	Sgor an Lochain Uaine	08A: Cairngorms	Aberdeenshire	1,258	118	4,127	387	36 43	NN954976	Hu,M,Sim
7	Cairn Gorm	08A: Cairngorms	Highland/ Moray	1,245	146	4,084	478	36	NJ005040	Hu,M,Sim,sMa
8	Aonach Beag	04A: Fort William to Loch Treig & Loch Leven	Highland	1,234	404	4,049	1,325	41	NN197715	Ma,M,Sim
9	Aonach Mòr	04A: Fort William to Loch Treig & Loch Leven	Highland	1,221	134	4,006	440	41	NN193729	Hu,M,Sim
10	Càrn Dearg (NW)	04A: Fort William to Loch Treig & Loch Leven	Highland	1,221	36	4,006	118	41	NN159719	MT,Sim
11	Càrn Mòr Dearg	04A: Fort William to Loch Treig & Loch Leven	Highland	1,220	162	4,003	531	41	NN177721	Ma,M,Sim
12	Cairn Lochan	08A: Cairngorms	Highland/ Moray	1,216	91	3,990	299	36	NH985025	MT,Sim,sHu
13	Ben Lawers	02B: Glen Lyon to Glen Dochart & Loch Tay	Perth and Kinross	1,214	915	3,983	3,002	51	NN635414	Ma,M,Sim,CoH,CoU,CoA
14	Stob Coire an t-Saighdeir	08A: Cairngorms	Aberdeenshire	1,213	46	3,980	151	36 43	NN962963	MT,Sim
15	Beinn a' Bhuird	08B: Cairngorms	Aberdeenshire/ Moray	1,197	456	3,927	1,496	36	NJ092006	Ma,M,Sim
16	Sròn na Lairige	08A: Cairngorms	Aberdeenshire/ Highland	1,184	50	3,885	164	36	NH964006	MT,Sim
17	Beinn Mheadhoin	08A: Cairngorms	Moray	1,183	254	3,881	833	36	NJ024016	Ma,M,Sim
18	Càrn Eige	11A: Loch Duich to Cannich	Highland	1,183	1,147	3,881	3,763	25	NH123261	Ma,M,Sim,CoH
19	Mam Sodhail	11A: Loch Duich to Cannich	Highland	1,179	132	3,869	434	25	NH120253	Hu,M,Sim
20	Beinn a' Bhuird South Top	08B: Cairngorms	Aberdeenshire	1,179	50	3,868	164	36 43	NO091986	MT,Sim
21	Stob Choire Claurigh	04A: Fort William to Loch Treig & Loch Leven	Highland	1,177	446	3,862	1,463	41	NN261738	Ma,M,Sim
22	Stob Coire an t-Sneachda	08A: Cairngorms	Highland/ Moray	1,176	65	3,858	213	36	NH996029	MT,Sim
23	Ben More	01C: Loch Lomond to Strathyre	Stirling	1,174	986	3,852	3,235	51	NN432244	Ma,M,Sim,CoU,CoA
24	Cnap a' Chleirich	08B: Cairngorms	Aberdeenshire/ Moray	1,174	33	3,852	108	36	NJ107010	MT,Sim
25	Ben Avon	08B: Cairngorms	Aberdeenshire/ Moray	1,171	197	3,842	646	36	NJ131018	Ma,M,Sim
26	Stob Binnein	01C: Loch Lomond to Strathyre	Stirling	1,165	303	3,822	994	51	NN434227	Ma,M,Sim
27	Beinn Bhrotain	08A: Cairngorms	Aberdeenshire	1,157	258	3,796	846	43	NN954922	Ma,M,Sim
28	Lochnagar	07A: Braemar to Montrose	Aberdeenshire	1,156	671	3,793	2,201	44	NO243861	Ma,M,Sim
29	Derry Cairngorm	08A: Cairngorms	Aberdeenshire	1,155	141	3,789	463	36 43	NO017980	Hu,M,Sim,sMa
30	Sgurr na Lapaich	12B: Killilan to Inverness	Highland	1,151	840	3,776	2,756	25	NH161351	Ma,M,Sim
31	Sgurr nan Ceathreamhnan	11A: Loch Duich to Cannich	Highland	1,151	434	3,776	1,424	25 33	NH057228	Ma,M,Sim
32	Bidean nam Bian	03B: Loch Linnhe to Loch Etive	Highland	1,149	844	3,771	2,769	41	NN143542	Ma,M,Sim,CoH
33	Ben Alder	04B: Loch Treig to Loch Ericht	Highland	1,148	783	3,766	2,569	42	NN496718	Ma,M,Sim
34	Stob a' Choire Dhomhain	11A: Loch Duich to Cannich	Highland	1,147	50	3,761	164	25	NH131264	MT,Sim
35	Sgurr nan Ceathreamhnan West Top	11A: Loch Duich to Cannich	Highland	1,143	38	3,750	125	25 33	NH052228	MT,Sim
36	Stob Coire Dhomhnuill	11A: Loch Duich to Cannich	Highland	1,139	33	3,737	109	25	NH137262	MT,Sim
37	Geal-chàrn	04B: Loch Treig to Loch Ericht	Highland	1,132	410	3,714	1,345	42	NN469746	Ma,M,Sim
38	Ben Lui	01D: Inveraray to Crianlarich	Stirling	1,130	875	3,707	2,871	50	NN266262	Ma,M,Sim
39	Binnein Mòr	04A: Fort William to Loch Treig & Loch Leven	Highland	1,130	759	3,707	2,490	41	NN212663	Ma,M,Sim
40	An Riabhachan	12B: Killilan to Inverness	Highland	1,129	302	3,704	991	25	NH133344	Ma,M,Sim
41	Creag Meagaidh	09C: Loch Lochy to Loch Laggan	Highland	1,128	867	3,701	2,844	34 42	NN418875	Ma,M,Sim
42	Ben Cruachan	03C: Glen Etive to Glen Lochy	Argyll and Bute	1,127	880	3,698	2,887	50	NN069304	Ma,M,Sim,CoU,CoA
43	Meall Garbh	02B: Glen Lyon to Glen Dochart & Loch Tay	Perth and Kinross	1,123	198	3,685	650	51	NN644437	Ma,M,Sim
44	Stob Coire na Ceannain	04A: Fort William to Loch Treig & Loch Leven	Highland	1,123	59	3,684	194	41	NN267745	MT,Sim
45	Beinn a' Ghlo	06B: Pitlochry to Braemar & Blairgowrie	Perth and Kinross	1,122	658	3,681	2,159	43	NN971733	Ma,M,Sim
46	A' Chraileag	11B: Glen Affric to Glen Moriston	Highland	1,120	786	3,675	2,579	33	NH094147	Ma,M,Sim
47	Sgor Gaoith	08A: Cairngorms	Highland	1,118	242	3,668	794	36 43	NN903989	Ma,M,Sim
48	An Stuc	02B: Glen Lyon to Glen Dochart & Loch Tay	Perth and Kinross	1,117	126	3,665	413	51	NN638431	Hu,M,Sim
49	Stob Coire an Laoigh	04A: Fort William to Loch Treig & Loch Leven	Highland	1,116	74	3,661	243	41	NN239725	M,Sim
50	Aonach Beag (Ben Alder)	04B: Loch Treig to Loch Ericht	Highland	1,116	99	3,661	325	42	NN457741	M,Sim,sHu
51	Stob Coire nan Lochan	03B: Loch Linnhe to Loch Etive	Highland	1,116	117	3,660	382	41	NN148548	Hu,MT,Sim
52	Stob Coire Easain	04A: Fort William to Loch Treig & Loch Leven	Highland	1,115	611	3,658	2,005	41	NN308730	Ma,M,Sim
53	Monadh Mòr	08A: Cairngorms	Aberdeenshire/ Highland	1,113	138	3,652	453	36 43	NN938942	Hu,M,Sim
54	Tom a' Choinich	11A: Loch Duich to Cannich	Highland	1,112	149	3,648	489	25	NH164273	Hu,M,Sim,sMa
55	Sgoran Dubh Mòr	08A: Cairngorms	Highland	1,111	58	3,645	190	36	NH904002	MT,Sim
56	Càrn a' Choire Bhoidheach	07A: Braemar to Montrose	Aberdeenshire	1,110	75	3,641	246	44	NO226845	M,Sim
57	Sgurr nan Conbhairean	11B: Glen Affric to Glen Moriston	Highland	1,109	382	3,638	1,253	34	NH129138	Ma,M,Sim
58	Sgurr Mòr	14B: The Fannaichs	Highland	1,108	913	3,635	2,995	20	NH203718	Ma,M,Sim
59	Creagan a' Choire Etchachan	08A: Cairngorms	Aberdeenshire	1,108	55	3,635	180	36 43	NO011996	MT,Sim
60	Meall a' Bhuiridh	03C: Glen Etive to Glen Lochy	Highland	1,108	795	3,635	2,608	41	NN250503	Ma,M,Sim
61	Caisteal	04A: Fort William to Loch Treig & Loch Leven	Highland	1,106	51	3,629	167	41	NN246729	MT,Sim
62	Stob a' Choire Mheadhoin	04A: Fort William to Loch Treig & Loch Leven	Highland	1,105	140	3,625	459	41	NN316736	Hu,M,Sim,sMa
63	Beinn Eibhinn	04B: Loch Treig to Loch Ericht	Highland	1,103	127	3,619	417	42	NN449733	Hu,M,Sim
64	Stob Dearg	03C: Glen Etive to Glen Lochy	Argyll and Bute	1,103	98	3,619	321	50	NN062307	MT,Sim,sHu
65	Beinn Ghlas	02B: Glen Lyon to Glen Dochart & Loch Tay	Perth and Kinross	1,103	107	3,619	351	51	NN625404	Hu,M,Sim
66	Mullach Fraoch-choire	11B: Glen Affric to Glen Moriston	Highland	1,102	153	3,615	502	33	NH094171	Ma,M,Sim
67	Creise	03C: Glen Etive to Glen Lochy	Highland	1,100	169	3,608	556	41	NN238506	Ma,M,Sim
68	Sgurr a' Mhaim	04A: Fort William to Loch Treig & Loch Leven	Highland	1,099	316	3,606	1,037	41	NN164667	Ma,M,Sim
69	Clach Leathad	03C: Glen Etive to Glen Lochy	Highland	1,099	68	3,605	222	50	NN240493	MT,Sim
70	Sgurr Choinnich Mòr	04A: Fort William to Loch Treig & Loch Leven	Highland	1,094	159	3,589	522	41	NN227714	Ma,M,Sim
71	Sgurr nan Clach Geala	14B: The Fannaichs	Highland	1,093	229	3,586	751	20	NH184714	Ma,M,Sim
72	Sgurr nan Clachan Geala	12B: Killilan to Inverness	Highland	1,093	62	3,586	203	25	NH161342	MT,Sim
73	Stob Ghabhar	03C: Glen Etive to Glen Lochy	Argyll and Bute/ Highland	1,090	393	3,576	1,289	50	NN230455	Ma,M,Sim
74	Bynack More	08A: Cairngorms	Highland	1,090	283	3,576	928	36	NJ041063	Ma,M,Sim
75	Beinn a' Chlachair	04B: Loch Treig to Loch Ericht	Highland	1,087	539	3,566	1,768	42	NN471781	Ma,M,Sim
76	Beinn Dearg	15A: Loch Broom to Strath Oykel	Highland	1,084	805	3,556	2,641	20	NH259811	Ma,M,Sim
77	Sgurr a' Choire Ghlais	12A: Kyle of Lochalsh to Garve	Highland	1,083	818	3,553	2,684	25	NH258430	Ma,M,Sim
78	Schiehallion	02A: Loch Rannoch to Glen Lyon	Perth and Kinross	1,083	716	3,553	2,349	42 51 52	NN713547	Ma,M,Sim
79	Beinn a' Chaorainn	08B: Cairngorms	Aberdeenshire/ Moray	1,083	246	3,553	807	36	NJ045013	Ma,M,Sim
80	Cuidhe Crom	07A: Braemar to Montrose	Aberdeenshire	1,083	38	3,553	125	44	NO259849	MT,Sim
81	Beinn a' Chreachain	02A: Loch Rannoch to Glen Lyon	Perth and Kinross	1,081	650	3,545	2,133	50	NN373440	Ma,M,Sim
82	Stob Coire Easain	04A: Fort William to Loch Treig & Loch Leven	Highland	1,080	45	3,543	148	41	NN234727	MT,Sim
83	Ben Starav	03C: Glen Etive to Glen Lochy	Highland	1,078	446	3,537	1,463	50	NN125427	Ma,M,Sim
84	Beinn Sheasgarnaich	02B: Glen Lyon to Glen Dochart & Loch Tay	Perth and Kinross	1,077	579	3,535	1,900	51	NN413383	Ma,M,Sim
85	Beinn Dorain	02A: Loch Rannoch to Glen Lyon	Argyll and Bute	1,076	332	3,530	1,089	50	NN325378	Ma,M,Sim
86	Stuc Bheag	11A: Loch Duich to Cannich	Highland	1,075	48	3,527	157	25 33	NH053237	MT,Sim
87	An Tudair	11A: Loch Duich to Cannich	Highland	1,074	66	3,524	217	25	NH127239	MT,Sim
88	Stob Coire Sgreamhach	03B: Loch Linnhe to Loch Etive	Highland	1,072	128	3,517	420	41	NN154536	Hu,M,Sim
89	Puist Coire Ardair	09C: Loch Lochy to Loch Laggan	Highland	1,071	45	3,514	148	34 42	NN437872	MT,Sim
90	Beinn a' Ghlo	06B: Pitlochry to Braemar & Blairgowrie	Perth and Kinross	1,070	222	3,510	730	43	NN945724	Ma,M,Sim
91	An Socach	12B: Killilan to Inverness	Highland	1,069	207	3,507	679	25	NH100332	Ma,M,Sim
92	Meall Corranaich	02B: Glen Lyon to Glen Dochart & Loch Tay	Perth and Kinross	1,069	202	3,507	663	51	NN615410	Ma,M,Sim
93	Sgurr Fhuaran	11A: Loch Duich to Cannich	Highland	1,069	665	3,506	2,182	33	NG978166	Ma,M,Sim
94	Glas Maol	07A: Braemar to Montrose	Angus	1,068	194	3,504	636	43	NO166765	Ma,M,Sim,CoH,CoU
95	Stob an Chul Choire	04A: Fort William to Loch Treig & Loch Leven	Highland	1,068	72	3,504	236	41	NN203731	MT,Sim
96	Cairn of Claise	07A: Braemar to Montrose	Aberdeenshire/ Angus	1,064	119	3,491	390	43	NO185788	Hu,M,Sim
97	An Teallach - Bidein a' Ghlas Thuill	14A: Loch Maree to Loch Broom	Highland	1,063	757	3,486	2,484	19	NH068843	Ma,M,Sim
98	Airgiod Bheinn	06B: Pitlochry to Braemar & Blairgowrie	Perth and Kinross	1,062	53	3,483	174	43	NN961719	MT,Sim
99	An Teallach - Sgurr Fiona	14A: Loch Maree to Loch Broom	Highland	1,059	142	3,473	465	19	NH064836	Hu,M,Sim,sMa
100	Liathach - Spidean a' Choire Leith	13A: Loch Torridon to Loch Maree	Highland	1,055	957	3,461	3,140	25	NG929579	Ma,M,Sim
101	Na Gruagaichean	04A: Fort William to Loch Treig & Loch Leven	Highland	1,054	97	3,459	318	41	NN203652	M,Sim,sHu
102	Toll Creagach	11A: Loch Duich to Cannich	Highland	1,054	182	3,458	597	25	NH194282	Ma,M,Sim
103	Stob Poite Coire Ardair	09C: Loch Lochy to Loch Laggan	Highland	1,054	109	3,458	358	34 42	NN428888	Hu,M,Sim
104	Sgùrr a' Chaorachain	12A: Kyle of Lochalsh to Garve	Highland	1,053	568	3,455	1,864	25	NH087447	Ma,M,Sim
105	Creag an Leth-choin	08A: Cairngorms	Highland	1,053	56	3,455	184	36	NH968033	MT,Sim
106	Beinn a' Chaorainn	09C: Loch Lochy to Loch Laggan	Highland	1,052	230	3,451	755	34 41	NN386850	Ma,M,Sim
107	Càrn Bàn Mòr	08A: Cairngorms	Highland	1,052	40	3,451	131	35 36 43	NN893972	MT,Sim
108	Glas Tulaichean	06B: Pitlochry to Braemar & Blairgowrie	Perth and Kinross	1,051	384	3,448	1,260	43	NO051760	Ma,M,Sim
109	An Leth-chreag	11A: Loch Duich to Cannich	Highland	1,051	57	3,448	187	25	NH154269	MT,Sim
110	Geal Chàrn	04B: Loch Treig to Loch Ericht	Highland	1,049	310	3,442	1,017	42	NN504811	Ma,M,Sim
111	Sgurr Fhuar-thuill	12A: Kyle of Lochalsh to Garve	Highland	1,049	147	3,442	482	25	NH235437	Hu,M,Sim,sMa
112	Corrag Bhuidhe	14A: Loch Maree to Loch Broom	Highland	1,049	44	3,442	144	19	NH064834	MT,Sim
113	Creag Mhòr	02B: Glen Lyon to Glen Dochart & Loch Tay	Perth and Kinross/ Stirling	1,047	393	3,435	1,289	50	NN391361	Ma,M,Sim
114	Càrn an t-Sagairt Mòr	07A: Braemar to Montrose	Aberdeenshire	1,047	85	3,435	279	44	NO208842	M,Sim
115	Bidean an Eoin Deirg	12A: Kyle of Lochalsh to Garve	Highland	1,047	85	3,433	279	25	NH103443	MT,Sim
116	Ben Wyvis - Glas Leathad Mòr	15B: Loch Vaich to Moray Firth	Highland	1,046	691	3,432	2,267	20	NH462683	Ma,M,Sim
117	Chnò Dearg	04B: Loch Treig to Loch Ericht	Highland	1,046	644	3,432	2,113	41	NN377741	Ma,M,Sim
118	Cruach Ardrain	01C: Loch Lomond to Strathyre	Stirling	1,046	549	3,431	1,801	51 56	NN409212	Ma,M,Sim
119	Beinn Iutharn Mhòr	06B: Pitlochry to Braemar & Blairgowrie	Aberdeenshire/ Perth and Kinross	1,045	247	3,428	810	43	NO045792	Ma,M,Sim
120	Càrn an t-Sagairt Beag	07A: Braemar to Montrose	Aberdeenshire	1,044	41	3,427	135	44	NO216848	MT,Sim
121	Stob Coir' an Albannaich	03C: Glen Etive to Glen Lochy	Argyll and Bute/ Highland	1,044	306	3,425	1,004	50	NN169443	Ma,M,Sim
122	Meall nan Tarmachan	02B: Glen Lyon to Glen Dochart & Loch Tay	Perth and Kinross	1,044	494	3,424	1,622	51	NN585389	Ma,M,Sim
123	Beinn a' Chaorainn North Top	09C: Loch Lochy to Loch Laggan	Highland	1,043	39	3,422	128	34 41	NN383857	MT,Sim
124	Càrn Mairg	02A: Loch Rannoch to Glen Lyon	Perth and Kinross	1,042	466	3,419	1,529	42 51	NN684512	Ma,M,Sim
125	Stuc Mòr	11A: Loch Duich to Cannich	Highland	1,041	50	3,415	164	25 33	NH053242	MT,Sim
126	Sgurr na Cìche	10B: Knoydart to Glen Kingie	Highland	1,040	839	3,412	2,753	33 40	NM902966	Ma,M,Sim
127	Meall Ghaordaidh	02B: Glen Lyon to Glen Dochart & Loch Tay	Perth and Kinross/ Stirling	1,040	492	3,411	1,614	51	NN514397	Ma,M,Sim
128	Na Gruagaichean NW Top	04A: Fort William to Loch Treig & Loch Leven	Highland	1,039	44	3,408	145	41	NN201654	MT,Sim
129	Beinn Achaladair	02A: Loch Rannoch to Glen Lyon	Argyll and Bute/ Perth and Kinross	1,039	226	3,407	741	50	NN344432	Ma,M,Sim
130	An Riabhachan West Top	12B: Killilan to Inverness	Highland	1,038	37	3,406	121	25	NH117337	MT,Sim
131	Càrn a' Mhaim	08A: Cairngorms	Aberdeenshire	1,037	231	3,402	758	36 43	NN994951	Ma,M,Sim
132	Sgurr a' Bhealaich Dheirg	11A: Loch Duich to Cannich	Highland	1,036	311	3,399	1,020	33	NH035143	Ma,M,Sim
133	Sgurr na Lapaich	11A: Loch Duich to Cannich	Highland	1,036	109	3,399	358	25	NH154243	Hu,MT,Sim
134	Gleouraich	10A: Glen Shiel to Loch Hourn and Loch Quoich	Highland	1,035	765	3,396	2,510	33	NH039053	Ma,M,Sim
135	Càrn Dearg	04B: Loch Treig to Loch Ericht	Highland	1,034	158	3,392	518	42	NN504764	Ma,M,Sim
136	Beinn Fhada	11A: Loch Duich to Cannich	Highland	1,032	647	3,386	2,123	33	NH018192	Ma,M,Sim
137	Am Bodach	04A: Fort William to Loch Treig & Loch Leven	Highland	1,032	153	3,385	501	41	NN176650	Ma,M,Sim
138	Creag Ghorm a' Bhealaich	12A: Kyle of Lochalsh to Garve	Highland	1,030	81	3,379	266	25	NH244435	MT,Sim
139	Ben Oss	01D: Inveraray to Crianlarich	Stirling	1,029	342	3,376	1,122	50	NN287253	Ma,M,Sim
140	Càrn an Rìgh	06B: Pitlochry to Braemar & Blairgowrie	Perth and Kinross	1,029	258	3,376	846	43	NO028772	Ma,M,Sim
141	Càrn Gorm	02A: Loch Rannoch to Glen Lyon	Perth and Kinross	1,029	187	3,376	614	42 51	NN635500	Ma,M,Sim
142	Sgor Iutharn	04B: Loch Treig to Loch Ericht	Highland	1,028	57	3,373	187	42	NN489743	MT,Sim
143	Meall Coire Choille-rais	09C: Loch Lochy to Loch Laggan	Highland	1,028	49	3,373	161	34 42	NN432862	MT,Sim
144	Sgurr a' Mhaoraich	10A: Glen Shiel to Loch Hourn and Loch Quoich	Highland	1,027	708	3,369	2,323	33	NG983065	Ma,M,Sim
145	Sgurr na Ciste Duibhe	11A: Loch Duich to Cannich	Highland	1,027	178	3,369	584	33	NG984149	Ma,M,Sim
146	Meall Garbh	02B: Glen Lyon to Glen Dochart & Loch Tay	Perth and Kinross/ Stirling	1,027	75	3,368	247	51	NN578383	MT,Sim
147	Ben Challum	02B: Glen Lyon to Glen Dochart & Loch Tay	Stirling	1,025	450	3,363	1,476	50	NN386322	Ma,M,Sim
148	Drochaid Ghlas	03C: Glen Etive to Glen Lochy	Argyll and Bute	1,024	91	3,361	297	50	NN083307	MT,Sim,sHu
149	Beinn a' Bheithir - Sgorr Dhearg	03B: Loch Linnhe to Loch Etive	Highland	1,024	729	3,360	2,392	41	NN056558	Ma,M,Sim
150	Liathach - Mullach an Rathain	13A: Loch Torridon to Loch Maree	Highland	1,024	152	3,359	499	25	NG911576	Ma,M,Sim
151	West Meur Gorm Craig	08B: Cairngorms	Moray	1,023	40	3,356	131	36	NJ153036	MT,Sim
152	Buachaille Etive Mòr	03B: Loch Linnhe to Loch Etive	Highland	1,021	532	3,351	1,745	41	NN222542	Ma,M,Sim
153	Ladhar Bheinn	10B: Knoydart to Glen Kingie	Highland	1,020	795	3,346	2,608	33	NG824039	Ma,M,Sim
154	Càrn Dearg (SW)	04A: Fort William to Loch Treig & Loch Leven	Highland	1,020	35	3,346	115	41	NN155701	MT,Sim
155	Aonach air Chrith	10A: Glen Shiel to Loch Hourn and Loch Quoich	Highland	1,020	493	3,345	1,617	33	NH051083	Ma,M,Sim
156	Beinn Bheoil	04B: Loch Treig to Loch Ericht	Highland	1,019	186	3,343	610	42	NN517717	Ma,M,Sim
157	Mullach Clach a' Bhlair	08A: Cairngorms	Highland	1,019	104	3,343	341	35 43	NN882927	Hu,M,Sim
158	Càrn an Tuirc	07A: Braemar to Montrose	Aberdeenshire	1,019	64	3,343	210	43	NO174804	M,Sim
159	A' Choinneach	08A: Cairngorms	Highland/ Moray	1,017	77	3,337	253	36	NJ032048	MT,Sim
160	Beinn a' Chaorainn Bheag	08B: Cairngorms	Moray	1,017	65	3,337	213	36	NJ057017	MT,Sim
161	Sgurr Creag an Eich	14A: Loch Maree to Loch Broom	Highland	1,016	97	3,335	318	19	NH055838	MT,Sim,sHu
162	Mullach Coire Mhic Fhearchair	14A: Loch Maree to Loch Broom	Highland	1,015	591	3,331	1,939	19	NH052735	Ma,M,Sim
163	Garbh Chìoch Mhòr	10B: Knoydart to Glen Kingie	Highland	1,013	168	3,323	551	33 40	NM909961	Ma,M,Sim
164	Cairn Bannoch	07A: Braemar to Montrose	Aberdeenshire/ Angus	1,012	77	3,320	253	44	NO222825	M,Sim
165	Meall Liath	02A: Loch Rannoch to Glen Lyon	Perth and Kinross	1,012	60	3,320	197	42 51	NN692512	MT,Sim
166	The Saddle	10A: Glen Shiel to Loch Hourn and Loch Quoich	Highland	1,011	334	3,318	1,096	33	NG936131	Ma,M,Sim
167	Beinn Ìme	01D: Inveraray to Crianlarich	Argyll and Bute	1,011	712	3,317	2,336	56	NN254084	Ma,M,Sim
168	Stob na Doire	03B: Loch Linnhe to Loch Etive	Highland	1,010	144	3,315	472	41	NN207532	Hu,MT,Sim,sMa
169	Beinn Udlamain	05A: Loch Ericht to Glen Tromie & Glen Garry	Highland/ Perth and Kinross	1,010	555	3,314	1,821	42	NN579739	Ma,M,Sim
170	Beinn Eighe - Ruadh-stac Mor	13A: Loch Torridon to Loch Maree	Highland	1,010	632	3,314	2,073	19	NG951611	Ma,M,Sim
171	Sgurr Eilde Mòr	04A: Fort William to Loch Treig & Loch Leven	Highland	1,010	271	3,314	889	41	NN230657	Ma,M,Sim
172	Sgurr an Doire Leathain	10A: Glen Shiel to Loch Hourn and Loch Quoich	Highland	1,010	189	3,314	620	33	NH015098	Ma,M,Sim
173	Beinn Dearg	06A: Glen Tromie to Glen Tilt	Perth and Kinross	1,009	473	3,309	1,552	43	NN852778	Ma,M,Sim
174	Stob Coire na Craileig	11B: Glen Affric to Glen Moriston	Highland	1,008	56	3,307	184	33	NH091163	MT,Sim
175	An Sgarsoch	06A: Glen Tromie to Glen Tilt	Aberdeenshire/ Perth and Kinross	1,007	319	3,302	1,047	43	NN933836	Ma,M,Sim
176	Càrn Liath	09C: Loch Lochy to Loch Laggan	Highland	1,006	87	3,301	285	34	NN472903	M,Sim
177	Creag Coire na Fiar Bhealaich	10A: Glen Shiel to Loch Hourn and Loch Quoich	Highland	1,006	59	3,301	194	33	NH047051	MT,Sim
178	Creag Toll a' Choin	12A: Kyle of Lochalsh to Garve	Highland	1,005	403	3,298	1,322	25	NH130453	Ma,Sim,xMT
179	Beinn Fhionnlaidh	11A: Loch Duich to Cannich	Highland	1,005	173	3,296	568	25	NH115282	Ma,M,Sim
180	Beinn an Dothaidh	02A: Loch Rannoch to Glen Lyon	Argyll and Bute	1,004	247	3,294	810	50	NN331408	Ma,M,Sim
181	Sgurr an Lochain	10A: Glen Shiel to Loch Hourn and Loch Quoich	Highland	1,004	123	3,294	404	33	NH005104	Hu,M,Sim
182	The Devil's Point	08A: Cairngorms	Aberdeenshire	1,004	89	3,294	292	36 43	NN976951	M,Sim
183	Meall a' Bharr	02A: Loch Rannoch to Glen Lyon	Perth and Kinross	1,004	36	3,294	118	42 51	NN668515	MT,Sim
184	Beinn Achaladair South Top	02A: Loch Rannoch to Glen Lyon	Argyll and Bute/ Perth and Kinross	1,004	47	3,293	153	50	NN342420	MT,Sim
185	Sgurr Mòr	10B: Knoydart to Glen Kingie	Highland	1,003	341	3,291	1,119	33 40	NM965980	Ma,M,Sim
186	Sgurr na Carnach	11A: Loch Duich to Cannich	Highland	1,002	134	3,287	440	33	NG977158	Hu,M,Sim
187	Sàil Chaorainn	11B: Glen Affric to Glen Moriston	Highland	1,002	88	3,287	289	34	NH133154	M,Sim
188	Beinn a' Bheithir - Sgorr Dhonuill	03B: Loch Linnhe to Loch Etive	Highland	1,001	244	3,284	801	41	NN040555	Ma,M,Sim
189	Aonach Meadhoin	11A: Loch Duich to Cannich	Highland	1,001	174	3,284	571	33	NH048137	Ma,M,Sim
190	Meall Greigh	02B: Glen Lyon to Glen Dochart & Loch Tay	Perth and Kinross	1,001	167	3,284	548	51	NN674438	Ma,M,Sim
191	Càrn na Coire Mheadhoin (Centre Top)	11B: Glen Affric to Glen Moriston	Highland	1,001	36	3,284	118	34	NH134158	MT,Sim
192	Beinn nan Eachan	02B: Glen Lyon to Glen Dochart & Loch Tay	Stirling	1,000	91	3,281	297	51	NN570383	MT,Sim,sHu
193	Stob Ban	04A: Fort William to Loch Treig & Loch Leven	Highland	1,000	237	3,280	778	41	NN147654	Ma,M,Sim
194	Sgurr an Iubhair	04A: Fort William to Loch Treig & Loch Leven	Highland	1,000	77	3,280	252	41	NN165655	MT,Sim
195	Stob Dàimh	03C: Glen Etive to Glen Lochy	Argyll and Bute	999	135	3,278	441	50	NN094308	Hu,M,Sim
196	Sgurr Choinnich	12A: Kyle of Lochalsh to Garve	Highland	999	133	3,278	436	25	NH076446	Hu,M,Sim
197	Sgurr Breac	14B: The Fannaichs	Highland	999	451	3,278	1,480	20	NH158711	Ma,M,Sim
198	Ben More Assynt	16E: Scourie to Lairg	Highland	998	835	3,274	2,740	15	NC318201	Ma,M,Sim,CoH
199	Broad Cairn	07A: Braemar to Montrose	Aberdeenshire/ Angus	998	64	3,274	210	44	NO240815	M,Sim
200	Ben Challum South Top	02B: Glen Lyon to Glen Dochart & Loch Tay	Stirling	998	45	3,274	148	50	NN386315	MT,Sim
201	Creag a' Chaorainn	11B: Glen Affric to Glen Moriston	Highland	998	37	3,274	121	34	NH137131	MT,Sim
202	Meall Dubhag	08A: Cairngorms	Highland	998	32	3,274	105	35 36 43	NN880955	MT,Sim
203	Glas Bheinn Mhòr	03C: Glen Etive to Glen Lochy	Argyll and Bute/ Highland	997	231	3,271	758	50	NN153429	Ma,M,Sim
204	A' Chailleach	14B: The Fannaichs	Highland	997	182	3,271	597	19	NH136714	Ma,M,Sim
205	Spidean Mialach	10A: Glen Shiel to Loch Hourn and Loch Quoich	Highland	996	257	3,268	843	33	NH065043	Ma,M,Sim
206	Mullach Cadha Rainich	11A: Loch Duich to Cannich	Highland	996	34	3,268	112	25	NH139246	MT,Sim
207	An Caisteal	01C: Loch Lomond to Strathyre	Stirling	996	473	3,267	1,552	50 56	NN378193	Ma,M,Sim
208	Càrn an Fhidhleir	06A: Glen Tromie to Glen Tilt	Aberdeenshire/ Highland/ Perth and Kinross	994	286	3,261	937	43	NN904841	Ma,M,Sim
209	Sgurr na h-Ulaidh	03B: Loch Linnhe to Loch Etive	Highland	994	415	3,261	1,362	41	NN111517	Ma,M,Sim
210	Sgurr na Ruaidhe	12A: Kyle of Lochalsh to Garve	Highland	993	226	3,258	741	25	NH289426	Ma,M,Sim
211	Càrn nan Gobhar	12B: Killilan to Inverness	Highland	993	197	3,258	646	25	NH181343	Ma,M,Sim
212	Beinn Eighe	13A: Loch Torridon to Loch Maree	Highland	993	172	3,258	564	25	NG966597	Ma,M,Sim
213	An Cearcallach	09C: Loch Lochy to Loch Laggan	Highland	993	35	3,258	115	34 42	NN422853	MT,Sim
214	Sgurr Alasdair	17B: Minginish and the Cuillin Hills	Highland	992	992	3,255	3,255	32	NG450207	Ma,M,Sim,SIB
215	Càrn nan Gobhar	12A: Kyle of Lochalsh to Garve	Highland	992	137	3,255	449	25	NH273438	Hu,M,Sim
216	Sgàirneach Mhòr	05A: Loch Ericht to Glen Tromie & Glen Garry	Perth and Kinross	991	182	3,251	597	42	NN598731	Ma,M,Sim
217	Stob Choire a' Mhail	04A: Fort William to Loch Treig & Loch Leven	Highland	990	66	3,248	217	41	NN163660	MT,Sim
218	Sgurr nan Spainteach	11A: Loch Duich to Cannich	Highland	990	65	3,248	213	33	NG991150	MT,Sim
219	Beinn Eunaich	03C: Glen Etive to Glen Lochy	Argyll and Bute	989	425	3,245	1,394	50	NN135327	Ma,M,Sim
220	Sgurr Ban	14A: Loch Maree to Loch Broom	Highland	989	165	3,245	541	19	NH055745	Ma,M,Sim
221	Creag Leacach	07A: Braemar to Montrose	Angus/ Perth and Kinross	988	71	3,242	232	43	NO154745	M,Sim
222	Gulvain	10D: Mallaig to Fort William	Highland	987	842	3,238	2,762	41	NN002875	Ma,M,Sim
223	Lurg Mhòr	12A: Kyle of Lochalsh to Garve	Highland	987	442	3,238	1,450	25	NH064404	Ma,M,Sim
224	Druim Shionnach	10A: Glen Shiel to Loch Hourn and Loch Quoich	Highland	987	101	3,238	331	33	NH074084	Hu,M,Sim
225	Conival	16E: Scourie to Lairg	Highland	987	101	3,238	331	15	NC303199	Hu,M,Sim
226	Sgurr an Fhuarail	11A: Loch Duich to Cannich	Highland	987	71	3,238	233	33	NH054139	MT,Sim
227	Beinn Alligin - Sgurr Mhòr	13A: Loch Torridon to Loch Maree	Highland	986	601	3,235	1,972	19 24	NG865612	Ma,M,Sim
228	Sgurr Dearg	17B: Minginish and the Cuillin Hills	Highland	986	187	3,235	614	32	NG444215	Ma,M,Sim
229	Mam nan Càrn	06B: Pitlochry to Braemar & Blairgowrie	Perth and Kinross	986	76	3,235	249	43	NO049779	MT,Sim
230	Ben Vorlich	01B: Strathyre to Strathallan	Perth and Kinross	985	834	3,232	2,736	57	NN629189	Ma,M,Sim
231	Stob a' Choire Liath Mhòr	13A: Loch Torridon to Loch Maree	Highland	983	52	3,225	171	25	NG932581	MT,Sim
232	Creag an Dubh-loch	07A: Braemar to Montrose	Aberdeenshire	983	47	3,225	154	44	NO232823	MT,Sim
233	Sgurr an Lochan Uaine	08A: Cairngorms	Aberdeenshire	983	44	3,225	144	36 43	NO025991	MT,Sim
234	Mullach na Dheiragain	11A: Loch Duich to Cannich	Highland	982	144	3,222	472	25 33	NH080259	Hu,M,Sim,sMa
235	Stob Garbh	03C: Glen Etive to Glen Lochy	Argyll and Bute	982	51	3,221	166	50	NN095302	MT,Sim
236	An Gearanach	04A: Fort William to Loch Treig & Loch Leven	Highland	981	151	3,220	497	41	NN187669	Ma,M,Sim
237	Stob Coire a' Chàirn	04A: Fort William to Loch Treig & Loch Leven	Highland	981	125	3,220	409	41	NN185660	Ma=,Hu,M,Sim
238	Slioch	14A: Loch Maree to Loch Broom	Highland	981	626	3,219	2,054	19	NH004690	Ma,M,Sim
239	Meall na Aighean	02A: Loch Rannoch to Glen Lyon	Perth and Kinross	981	136	3,219	446	51	NN694496	Hu,M,Sim
240	Maol Chinn-dearg	10A: Glen Shiel to Loch Hourn and Loch Quoich	Highland	980	138	3,216	452	33	NH032087	Hu,M,Sim
241	Beinn a' Chochuill	03C: Glen Etive to Glen Lochy	Argyll and Bute	980	252	3,215	827	50	NN109328	Ma,M,Sim
242	Sàil Mhòr	13A: Loch Torridon to Loch Maree	Highland	980	118	3,215	387	19	NG938605	Hu,MT,Sim
243	Meikle Pap	07A: Braemar to Montrose	Aberdeenshire	980	63	3,215	207	44	NO259860	MT,Sim
244	Ciste Dhubh	11A: Loch Duich to Cannich	Highland	979	388	3,212	1,273	33	NH062166	Ma,M,Sim
245	Glas Mheall Mòr	14A: Loch Maree to Loch Broom	Highland	979	101	3,212	331	19	NH076853	Hu,MT,Sim
246	Stob Coire Sgriodain	04B: Loch Treig to Loch Ericht	Highland	979	90	3,212	295	41	NN356743	M,Sim,sHu
247	Beinn Dubhchraig	01D: Inveraray to Crianlarich	Stirling	978	199	3,209	653	50	NN307254	Ma,M,Sim
248	Con a' Mheall	15A: Loch Broom to Strath Oykel	Highland	978	165	3,209	541	20	NH275816	Ma,M,Sim
249	Meall Buidhe	02A: Loch Rannoch to Glen Lyon	Argyll and Bute/ Perth and Kinross	977	53	3,206	174	50	NN359438	MT,Sim
250	Stob Bàn	04A: Fort William to Loch Treig & Loch Leven	Highland	977	174	3,205	571	41	NN266723	Ma,M,Sim
251	Meall nan Ceapraichean	15A: Loch Broom to Strath Oykel	Highland	977	126	3,205	413	20	NH257825	Hu,M,Sim
252	Beinn a' Ghlò - Càrn Liath	06B: Pitlochry to Braemar & Blairgowrie	Perth and Kinross	976	211	3,202	692	43	NN936698	Ma,M,Sim
253	Coinneach Mhòr	13A: Loch Torridon to Loch Maree	Highland	976	108	3,202	354	19	NG944600	Hu,MT,Sim
254	Meall Garbh	04B: Loch Treig to Loch Ericht	Highland	976	53	3,202	174	41	NN371727	MT,Sim
255	Meall Buidhe	08A: Cairngorms	Highland	976	36	3,202	118	35 36	NH891001	MT,Sim
256	Càrn a' Gheoidh	06B: Pitlochry to Braemar & Blairgowrie	Aberdeenshire/ Perth and Kinross	975	298	3,199	978	43	NO107767	Ma,M,Sim
257	Stuc a' Chroin	01B: Strathyre to Strathallan	Perth and Kinross/ Stirling	975	252	3,199	827	57	NN617174	Ma,M,Sim
258	Ben Lomond	01C: Loch Lomond to Strathyre	Stirling	974	820	3,196	2,690	56	NN367028	Ma,M,Sim,CoH
259	Beinn Sgritheall	10A: Glen Shiel to Loch Hourn and Loch Quoich	Highland	974	500	3,196	1,640	33	NG835126	Ma,M,Sim
260	Meall Coire na Saobhaidhe	07A: Braemar to Montrose	Aberdeenshire	974	70	3,196	230	44	NO242872	MT,Sim
261	Mullach Sithidh	11A: Loch Duich to Cannich	Highland	974	49	3,196	161	25 33	NH082264	MT,Sim
262	Meall Mòr	12A: Kyle of Lochalsh to Garve	Highland	974	39	3,196	128	25	NH072405	MT,Sim
263	A' Mharconaich	05A: Loch Ericht to Glen Tromie & Glen Garry	Highland	973	112	3,193	367	42	NN604762	Hu,M,Sim
264	Sgurr a' Ghreadaidh	17B: Minginish and the Cuillin Hills	Highland	973	124	3,192	407	32	NG445231	Hu,M,Sim
265	Creag an Dail Mhor	08B: Cairngorms	Aberdeenshire	972	62	3,189	203	36 43	NO131982	MT,Sim
266	Sgurr Ban	13A: Loch Torridon to Loch Maree	Highland	970	65	3,182	213	19	NG974600	MT,Sim
267	Meall an t-Snaim	09C: Loch Lochy to Loch Laggan	Highland	970	35	3,182	115	34	NN459904	MT,Sim
268	Meall Garbh	02A: Loch Rannoch to Glen Lyon	Perth and Kinross	968	104	3,176	341	42 51	NN647516	Hu,M,Sim
269	Stob an Fhuarain	03B: Loch Linnhe to Loch Etive	Highland	968	103	3,176	338	41	NN118523	Hu,MT,Sim
270	Aonach Eagach	03A: Loch Leven to Rannoch Station	Highland	968	623	3,175	2,044	41	NN140583	Ma,M,Sim
271	A' Mhaighdean	14A: Loch Maree to Loch Broom	Highland	967	442	3,173	1,450	19	NH007749	Ma,M,Sim
272	Càrn na Con Dhu	11A: Loch Duich to Cannich	Highland	967	82	3,173	269	25 33	NH072241	MT,Sim
273	Sròn An Isean	03C: Glen Etive to Glen Lochy	Argyll and Bute	967	55	3,171	180	50	NN099311	MT,Sim
274	Ben More	17E: Mull and Nearby Islands	Argyll and Bute	966	966	3,169	3,169	47 48	NM525330	Ma,M,Sim,SIB
275	Meall na Dige	01C: Loch Lomond to Strathyre	Stirling	966	82	3,169	269	51	NN450225	MT,Sim
276	Sgurr na Banachdich	17B: Minginish and the Cuillin Hills	Highland	965	114	3,166	374	32	NG440224	Hu,M,Sim
277	Sgurr nan Gillean	17B: Minginish and the Cuillin Hills	Highland	964	203	3,163	666	32	NG471253	Ma,M,Sim
278	Càrn a' Chlamain	06A: Glen Tromie to Glen Tilt	Perth and Kinross	964	317	3,161	1,040	43	NN915758	Ma,M,Sim
279	Sgurr Thuilm	10D: Mallaig to Fort William	Highland	963	614	3,159	2,014	40	NM939879	Ma,M,Sim
280	Sgurr nan Fhir Duibhe	13A: Loch Torridon to Loch Maree	Highland	963	117	3,159	384	19	NG981600	Hu,MT,Sim
281	Sgurr a' Bhuic	04A: Fort William to Loch Treig & Loch Leven	Highland	963	65	3,159	213	41	NN204701	MT,Sim
282	Sgurr Choinnich Beag	04A: Fort William to Loch Treig & Loch Leven	Highland	963	62	3,159	203	41	NN220710	MT,Sim
283	Ben Klibreck - Meall nan Con	16D: Altnaharra to Dornoch	Highland	962	819	3,156	2,687	16	NC585299	Ma,M,Sim
284	Sgurr a' Dubh Doire	11A: Loch Duich to Cannich	Highland	962	48	3,156	157	33	NH034185	MT,Sim
285	Gulvain South Top	10D: Mallaig to Fort William	Highland	961	98	3,153	322	40	NM996864	MT,Sim,sHu
286	Càrn na Crìche	14B: The Fannaichs	Highland	961	69	3,153	226	20	NH196725	MT,Sim
287	Sgorr Ruadh	13B: Applecross to Achnasheen	Highland	961	723	3,152	2,372	25	NG959505	Ma,M,Sim
288	Glas Mheall Liath	14A: Loch Maree to Loch Broom	Highland	960	32	3,151	106	19	NH077841	MT,Sim
289	Stuchd an Lochain	02A: Loch Rannoch to Glen Lyon	Perth and Kinross	960	482	3,150	1,581	51	NN483448	Ma,M,Sim
290	Beinn nan Aighenan	03C: Glen Etive to Glen Lochy	Argyll and Bute	960	343	3,150	1,125	50	NN148405	Ma,M,Sim
291	Stob Cadha Gobhlach	14A: Loch Maree to Loch Broom	Highland	960	126	3,150	413	19	NH068825	Hu,MT,Sim
292	Ben More Assynt South Top	16E: Scourie to Lairg	Highland	960	47	3,150	154	15	NC324192	MT,Sim
293	Stob a' Choire Odhair	10B: Knoydart to Glen Kingie	Highland	960	45	3,150	148	33	NG830043	MT,Sim
294	Meall Glas	02B: Glen Lyon to Glen Dochart & Loch Tay	Stirling	959	554	3,146	1,818	51	NN431321	Ma,M,Sim
295	Beinn Fhionnlaidh	03B: Loch Linnhe to Loch Etive	Argyll and Bute	959	510	3,146	1,673	50	NN095497	Ma,M,Sim
296	Buachaille Etive Beag	03B: Loch Linnhe to Loch Etive	Highland	958	469	3,143	1,539	41	NN179535	Ma,M,Sim
297	Bruach na Frithe	17B: Minginish and the Cuillin Hills	Highland	958	125	3,143	410	32	NG460252	Hu,M,Sim
298	Tolmount	07A: Braemar to Montrose	Aberdeenshire/ Angus	958	72	3,143	236	44	NO210800	M,Sim
299	Stob Coire Sgriodain South Top	04B: Loch Treig to Loch Ericht	Highland	958	45	3,143	148	41	NN359738	MT,Sim
300	Stob Coire na Gaibhre	04A: Fort William to Loch Treig & Loch Leven	Highland	958	34	3,143	112	41	NN260757	MT,Sim
301	Stob Garbh	01C: Loch Lomond to Strathyre	Stirling	958	104	3,142	341	51	NN411221	Hu,MT,Sim
302	Tom Buidhe	07A: Braemar to Montrose	Angus	957	71	3,140	233	44	NO213787	M,Sim
303	Càrn Ghluasaid	11B: Glen Affric to Glen Moriston	Highland	957	62	3,140	203	34	NH145125	M,Sim
304	Sgùrr nan Coireachan	10D: Mallaig to Fort William	Highland	956	234	3,136	768	40	NM902880	Ma,M,Sim
305	Sàileag	11A: Loch Duich to Cannich	Highland	956	91	3,136	299	33	NH017148	M,Sim,sHu
306	Stob nan Clach	02B: Glen Lyon to Glen Dochart & Loch Tay	Perth and Kinross/ Stirling	956	71	3,136	233	50	NN387351	MT,Sim
307	Sròn Coire na h-Iolaire	04B: Loch Treig to Loch Ericht	Highland	956	71	3,136	233	42	NN513704	MT,Sim
308	Sgor Eilde Beag	04A: Fort William to Loch Treig & Loch Leven	Highland	956	33	3,135	107	41	NN219653	MT,Sim
309	Sgor Gaibhre	04B: Loch Treig to Loch Ericht	Highland/ Perth and Kinross	955	300	3,133	984	42	NN444674	Ma,M,Sim
310	Meall Dearg	13A: Loch Torridon to Loch Maree	Highland	955	38	3,133	125	25	NG913579	MT,Sim
311	Beinn Liath Mhòr Fannaich	14B: The Fannaichs	Highland	954	109	3,130	358	20	NH219724	Hu,M,Sim
312	Tom a' Choinnich	15B: Loch Vaich to Moray Firth	Highland	954	89	3,130	292	20	NH463700	MT,Sim
313	Meall an Fhuarain Mhoir	11A: Loch Duich to Cannich	Highland	954	65	3,130	213	33	NG999196	MT,Sim
314	Sail Liath	14A: Loch Maree to Loch Broom	Highland	954	56	3,130	184	19	NH071824	MT,Sim
315	Buachaille Etive Mòr	03B: Loch Linnhe to Loch Etive	Highland	953	135	3,128	442	41	NN190525	Hu,M,Sim
316	Am Faochagach	15A: Loch Broom to Strath Oykel	Highland	953	367	3,127	1,204	20	NH303793	Ma,M,Sim
317	Beinn Mhanach	02A: Loch Rannoch to Glen Lyon	Perth and Kinross	953	315	3,127	1,033	50	NN373411	Ma,M,Sim
318	Sgùrr nan Coireachan	10B: Knoydart to Glen Kingie	Highland	953	220	3,127	722	33 40	NM933958	Ma,M,Sim
319	Beinn Iutharn Bheag	06B: Pitlochry to Braemar & Blairgowrie	Aberdeenshire	953	105	3,127	344	43	NO065791	Hu,MT,Sim
320	Aonach Eagach - Meall Dearg	03A: Loch Leven to Rannoch Station	Highland	952	120	3,124	394	41	NN161583	Hu,M,Sim
321	Beinn Fhada	03B: Loch Linnhe to Loch Etive	Highland	952	50	3,123	164	41	NN159540	MT,Sim
322	Beinn nan Eachan East Top	02B: Glen Lyon to Glen Dochart & Loch Tay	Perth and Kinross/ Stirling	951	30	3,121	99	51	NN574383	Sim,xMT
323	Meall Chuaich	05B: Loch Ericht to Glen Tromie & Glen Garry	Highland	951	466	3,120	1,529	42	NN716878	Ma,M,Sim
324	Meall Gorm	14B: The Fannaichs	Highland	949	114	3,114	374	20	NH221695	Hu,M,Sim
325	Beinn Bhuidhe	01D: Inveraray to Crianlarich	Argyll and Bute	949	592	3,112	1,942	50 56	NN203187	Ma,M,Sim
326	Sgurr Mhic Choinnich	17B: Minginish and the Cuillin Hills	Highland	948	56	3,110	184	32	NG450210	M,Sim
327	Driesh	07A: Braemar to Montrose	Angus	947	138	3,107	453	44	NO271735	Hu,M,Sim
328	Creag Dubh	12B: Killilan to Inverness	Highland	947	94	3,107	308	25	NH199350	MT,Sim,sHu
329	Sgorr Bhan	03B: Loch Linnhe to Loch Etive	Highland	947	46	3,107	151	41	NN062560	MT,Sim
330	A' Chioch	11B: Glen Affric to Glen Moriston	Highland	947	31	3,107	102	34	NH108152	MT,Sim
331	Meall Buidhe	10B: Knoydart to Glen Kingie	Highland	946	496	3,104	1,627	33 40	NM848989	Ma,M,Sim
332	Sgurr na Sgine	10A: Glen Shiel to Loch Hourn and Loch Quoich	Highland	946	247	3,104	810	33	NG946113	Ma,M,Sim
333	Creag a' Mhaim	10A: Glen Shiel to Loch Hourn and Loch Quoich	Highland	946	80	3,104	262	33	NH087077	M,Sim
334	Beinn Tulaichean	01C: Loch Lomond to Strathyre	Stirling	946	122	3,103	400	56	NN416196	Hu,M,Sim
335	Càrn Dearg	09B: Glen Albyn and the Monadh Liath	Highland	946	591	3,103	1,939	35	NH635023	Ma,M,Sim
336	Càrn Bhac	06B: Pitlochry to Braemar & Blairgowrie	Aberdeenshire	945	187	3,101	613	43	NO051832	Ma,M,Sim
337	Stob a' Choire Odhair	03C: Glen Etive to Glen Lochy	Argyll and Bute/ Highland	945	277	3,100	909	50	NN257459	Ma,M,Sim
338	Bidein a' Choire Sheasgaich	12A: Kyle of Lochalsh to Garve	Highland	945	209	3,100	686	25	NH049412	Ma,M,Sim
339	An Socach	06B: Pitlochry to Braemar & Blairgowrie	Aberdeenshire	944	188	3,097	617	43	NO079800	Ma,M,Sim
340	Sgùrr Dubh Mòr	17B: Minginish and the Cuillin Hills	Highland	944	89	3,097	292	32	NG457205	M,Sim
341	Ben Vorlich	01D: Inveraray to Crianlarich	Argyll and Bute	943	632	3,094	2,073	50 56	NN295124	Ma,M,Sim,CoH
342	Binnein Beag	04A: Fort William to Loch Treig & Loch Leven	Highland	943	197	3,094	646	41	NN221677	Ma,M,Sim
343	Càrn Bàn	09B: Glen Albyn and the Monadh Liath	Highland	942	57	3,091	187	35	NH631031	MT,Sim
344	Càrn Cloich-mhuilinn	08A: Cairngorms	Aberdeenshire	942	75	3,091	246	43	NN968906	MT,Sim
345	Meall Buidhe SE Top	10B: Knoydart to Glen Kingie	Highland	942	30	3,091	98	33 40	NM852987	MT,Sim
346	Am Bodach	03A: Loch Leven to Rannoch Station	Highland	942	75	3,090	244	41	NN168580	MT,Sim
347	Beinn a' Chroin	01C: Loch Lomond to Strathyre	Stirling	941	137	3,089	450	50 56	NN387185	Hu,M,Sim
348	Càrn Dearg	04B: Loch Treig to Loch Ericht	Highland/ Perth and Kinross	941	218	3,087	715	42	NN417661	Ma,M,Sim
349	Stob a' Bhruaich Leith	03C: Glen Etive to Glen Lochy	Argyll and Bute/ Highland	941	42	3,087	138	50	NN208459	MT,Sim
350	Càrn na Caim	05B: Loch Ericht to Glen Tromie & Glen Garry	Highland/ Perth and Kinross	941	327	3,087	1,073	42	NN677821	Ma,M,Sim
351	Beinn a' Chroin East Top	01C: Loch Lomond to Strathyre	Stirling	940	63	3,084	207	50 56	NN393185	MT,Sim
352	Stob Coire Leith	03A: Loch Leven to Rannoch Station	Highland	939	62	3,082	202	41	NN149584	MT,Sim
353	Mullach nan Coirean	04A: Fort William to Loch Treig & Loch Leven	Highland	939	92	3,082	303	41	NN122662	M,Sim,sHu
354	Mount Keen	07B: Braemar to Montrose	Aberdeenshire/ Angus	939	312	3,081	1,024	44	NO409869	Ma,M,Sim
355	Luinne Bheinn	10B: Knoydart to Glen Kingie	Highland	939	255	3,081	837	33	NG869007	Ma,M,Sim
356	Spidean Dhomhuill Bhric	10A: Glen Shiel to Loch Hourn and Loch Quoich	Highland	939	48	3,081	157	33	NG922129	MT,Sim
357	Stob Coire Altruim	03B: Loch Linnhe to Loch Etive	Highland	939	35	3,080	116	41	NN197530	MT,Sim
358	Sgurr Dubh an Da Bheinn	17B: Minginish and the Cuillin Hills	Highland	938	52	3,077	171	32	NG455204	MT,Sim
359	An Socach East Top	06B: Pitlochry to Braemar & Blairgowrie	Aberdeenshire	938	42	3,077	138	43	NO098805	MT,Sim
360	Druim Shionnach West Top	10A: Glen Shiel to Loch Hourn and Loch Quoich	Highland	938	41	3,077	135	33	NH062082	MT,Sim
361	Beinn Sgulaird	03B: Loch Linnhe to Loch Etive	Argyll and Bute	937	662	3,074	2,172	50	NN053460	Ma,M,Sim
362	Sròn a' Choire Ghairbh	10C: Loch Arkaig to Glen Moriston	Highland	937	622	3,074	2,041	34	NN222945	Ma,M,Sim
363	Beinn Tarsuinn	14A: Loch Maree to Loch Broom	Highland	937	206	3,074	676	19	NH039727	Ma,M,Sim
364	Beinn Cheathaich	02B: Glen Lyon to Glen Dochart & Loch Tay	Stirling	937	78	3,074	256	51	NN444326	MT,Sim
365	A' Bhuidheanach Bheag	05B: Loch Ericht to Glen Tromie & Glen Garry	Highland/ Perth and Kinross	936	109	3,071	358	42	NN660775	Hu,M,Sim
366	Sgurr a' Fionn Choire	17B: Minginish and the Cuillin Hills	Highland	936	32	3,071	104	32	NG464252	MT,Sim
367	Beinn na Lap	04B: Loch Treig to Loch Ericht	Highland	935	406	3,068	1,332	41	NN376695	Ma,M,Sim
368	Toman Coinnich	14B: The Fannaichs	Highland	935	66	3,068	217	20	NH148713	MT,Sim
369	Meall a' Chrasgaidh	14B: The Fannaichs	Highland	934	115	3,064	377	20	NH184733	Hu,M,Sim
370	Sgurr an Tuill Bhain	14A: Loch Maree to Loch Broom	Highland	934	56	3,064	184	19	NH018688	MT,Sim
371	Am Basteir	17B: Minginish and the Cuillin Hills	Highland	934	49	3,064	161	32	NG465253	M,Sim
372	Fionn Bheinn	14B: The Fannaichs	Highland	933	658	3,061	2,159	20	NH147621	Ma,M,Sim
373	Maol Chean-dearg	13B: Applecross to Achnasheen	Highland	933	514	3,061	1,686	25	NG924499	Ma,M,Sim
374	The Cairnwell	06B: Pitlochry to Braemar & Blairgowrie	Aberdeenshire/ Perth and Kinross	933	125	3,061	410	43	NO134773	Hu,M,Sim
375	Meall Buidhe	02A: Loch Rannoch to Glen Lyon	Perth and Kinross	932	316	3,058	1,037	51	NN498499	Ma,M,Sim
376	Beinn Chabhair	01C: Loch Lomond to Strathyre	Stirling	932	313	3,058	1,027	50 56	NN367179	Ma,M,Sim
377	Ben Chonzie	01A: Loch Tay to Perth	Perth and Kinross	931	648	3,054	2,126	51 52	NN773308	Ma,M,Sim
378	Beinn Bhreac	08B: Cairngorms	Aberdeenshire	931	83	3,054	272	36 43	NO058970	M,Sim
379	Beinn Fhada NE Top	03B: Loch Linnhe to Loch Etive	Highland	931	55	3,054	180	41	NN164543	MT,Sim
380	Meall Cruidh	03C: Glen Etive to Glen Lochy	Argyll and Bute	930	35	3,051	115	50	NN129415	MT,Sim
381	A' Chailleach	09B: Glen Albyn and the Monadh Liath	Highland	929	108	3,049	355	35	NH681041	Hu,M,Sim
382	Bla Bheinn	17B: Minginish and the Cuillin Hills	Highland	929	862	3,048	2,828	32	NG529217	Ma,M,Sim
383	Sgor Choinnich	04B: Loch Treig to Loch Ericht	Highland/ Perth and Kinross	929	127	3,048	417	42	NN443683	Hu,MT,Sim
384	Sgurr nan Saighead	11A: Loch Duich to Cannich	Highland	929	108	3,048	353	33	NG974177	Hu,MT,Sim
385	Tigh Mòr na Seilge (NNE Top)	11B: Glen Affric to Glen Moriston	Highland	929	38	3,048	125	34	NH140166	MT,Sim
386	Am Fasarinen	13A: Loch Torridon to Loch Maree	Highland	929	57	3,047	186	25	NG923574	MT,Sim
387	Mòruisg	12A: Kyle of Lochalsh to Garve	Highland	928	594	3,045	1,949	25	NH101499	Ma,M,Sim
388	Meall nan Eun	03C: Glen Etive to Glen Lochy	Argyll and Bute	928	174	3,045	571	50	NN192449	Ma,M,Sim
389	Glas Leathad Beag	15B: Loch Vaich to Moray Firth	Highland	928	132	3,045	433	20	NH492706	Hu,MT,Sim
390	Mayar	07A: Braemar to Montrose	Angus	928	111	3,045	364	44	NO240737	Hu,M,Sim
391	Glas Mheall Mòr	05B: Loch Ericht to Glen Tromie & Glen Garry	Perth and Kinross	928	69	3,044	227	42	NN680769	MT,Sim
392	Ben Hope	16B: Durness to Loch Shin	Highland	927	772	3,041	2,533	9	NC477501	Ma,M,Sim
393	Beinn Narnain	01D: Inveraray to Crianlarich	Argyll and Bute	927	290	3,041	951	56	NN271066	Ma,M,Sim
394	Eididh nan Clach Geala	15A: Loch Broom to Strath Oykel	Highland	927	166	3,041	545	20	NH257842	Ma,M,Sim
395	Sròn Chona Choirein	02A: Loch Rannoch to Glen Lyon	Perth and Kinross	927	36	3,041	118	51	NN493445	MT,Sim
396	Sgurr nan Eag	17B: Minginish and the Cuillin Hills	Highland	926	130	3,039	427	32	NG457195	Hu,M,Sim
397	Beinn Liath Mhòr	13B: Applecross to Achnasheen	Highland	926	271	3,038	889	25	NG964519	Ma,M,Sim
398	Seana Bhraigh	15A: Loch Broom to Strath Oykel	Highland	926	251	3,038	823	20	NH281878	Ma,M,Sim
399	Geal Chàrn	09B: Glen Albyn and the Monadh Liath	Highland	926	100	3,038	328	35	NN561987	Hu,M,Sim
400	Sgurr Thormaid	17B: Minginish and the Cuillin Hills	Highland	926	38	3,038	125	32	NG441226	MT,Sim
401	Meall a' Choire Leith	02B: Glen Lyon to Glen Dochart & Loch Tay	Perth and Kinross	926	151	3,037	494	51	NN612438	Ma,M,Sim
402	Buachaille Etive Beag	03B: Loch Linnhe to Loch Etive	Highland	925	177	3,035	581	41	NN191548	Ma,M,Sim
403	Diollaid a' Chairn	04B: Loch Treig to Loch Ericht	Highland	925	38	3,035	125	42	NN487757	MT,Sim
404	Creag Pitridh	04B: Loch Treig to Loch Ericht	Highland	924	105	3,031	344	34 42	NN487814	Hu,M,Sim
405	An Sgorr	02A: Loch Rannoch to Glen Lyon	Perth and Kinross	924	73	3,031	240	42 51	NN640509	MT,Sim
406	An Coileachan	14B: The Fannaichs	Highland	924	148	3,031	487	20	NH241680	Hu,M,Sim,sMa
407	Sgurr nan Each	14B: The Fannaichs	Highland	923	109	3,028	358	20	NH184697	Hu,M,Sim
408	Beinn a' Chuirn	02A: Loch Rannoch to Glen Lyon	Argyll and Bute	923	74	3,028	243	50	NN360409	MT,Sim
409	Beinn Alligin - Tom na Gruagaich	13A: Loch Torridon to Loch Maree	Highland	922	155	3,025	509	19 24	NG859601	Ma,M,Sim
410	Mullach Coire nan Nead	04B: Loch Treig to Loch Ericht	Highland	922	39	3,025	128	42	NN430734	MT,Sim
411	Meall nan Tarmachan SE Top	02B: Glen Lyon to Glen Dochart & Loch Tay	Perth and Kinross	922	32	3,023	106	51	NN589385	MT,Sim
412	An Socach	11A: Loch Duich to Cannich	Highland	921	123	3,022	404	25 33	NH088229	Hu,M,Sim
413	Càrn Sgulain	09B: Glen Albyn and the Monadh Liath	Highland	920	72	3,019	235	35	NH683058	M,Sim
414	Meall Cuanail	03C: Glen Etive to Glen Lochy	Argyll and Bute	920	95	3,019	310	50	NN069295	MT,Sim,sHu
415	Sgiath Chuil	02B: Glen Lyon to Glen Dochart & Loch Tay	Stirling	920	311	3,018	1,020	51	NN462317	Ma,M,Sim
416	Geal-chàrn	08A: Cairngorms	Highland	920	54	3,018	177	35 36	NH884014	MT,Sim
417	Crow Craigies	07A: Braemar to Montrose	Angus	920	37	3,018	121	44	NO222798	MT,Sim
418	Càrn Ballach (SW Top)	09B: Glen Albyn and the Monadh Liath	Highland	920	49	3,018	160	35	NH643044	MT,Sim
419	Gairich	10B: Knoydart to Glen Kingie	Highland	919	552	3,015	1,811	33	NN025995	Ma,M,Sim
420	Sgurr Leac nan Each	10A: Glen Shiel to Loch Hourn and Loch Quoich	Highland	919	66	3,015	217	33	NG917133	MT,Sim
421	Ruadh Stac Mòr	14A: Loch Maree to Loch Broom	Highland	919	167	3,014	548	19	NH018756	Ma,M,Sim,xC
422	A' Ghlas-bheinn	11A: Loch Duich to Cannich	Highland	918	407	3,012	1,335	25 33	NH008231	Ma,M,Sim
423	Creag nan Damh	10A: Glen Shiel to Loch Hourn and Loch Quoich	Highland	918	189	3,012	620	33	NG983112	Ma,M,Sim
424	Sgurr a' Mhadaidh	17B: Minginish and the Cuillin Hills	Highland	918	71	3,012	233	32	NG446235	M,Sim
425	Stob an Duine Ruaidh	03C: Glen Etive to Glen Lochy	Argyll and Bute	918	66	3,012	217	50	NN124409	MT,Sim
426	Tom Dubh	08A: Cairngorms	Highland	918	40	3,012	131	36 43	NN921952	MT,Sim
427	Stuc Fraoch Choire	11A: Loch Duich to Cannich	Highland	918	36	3,012	118	25 33	NH052253	MT,Sim
428	Tom na Sroine	04A: Fort William to Loch Treig & Loch Leven	Highland	918	34	3,012	112	41	NN207745	MT,Sim
429	Mullach nan Coirean SE Top	04A: Fort William to Loch Treig & Loch Leven	Highland	918	68	3,010	221	41	NN131654	MT,Sim
430	Geal-chàrn	05A: Loch Ericht to Glen Tromie & Glen Garry	Highland	917	178	3,009	584	42	NN596782	Ma,M,Sim
431	Càrn Bhinnein	06B: Pitlochry to Braemar & Blairgowrie	Perth and Kinross	917	63	3,009	207	43	NO091762	MT,Sim
432	Meall na Teanga	10C: Loch Arkaig to Glen Moriston	Highland	917	306	3,008	1,002	34	NN220924	Ma,M,Sim
433	Mullach nan Coirean East Top	04A: Fort William to Loch Treig & Loch Leven	Highland	917	39	3,007	127	41	NN137656	Sim
434	Beinn a' Chleibh	01D: Inveraray to Crianlarich	Argyll and Bute/ Stirling	916	141	3,006	463	50	NN250256	Hu,M,Sim,sMa
435	Stob Coire Dubh	09C: Loch Lochy to Loch Laggan	Highland	916	31	3,005	102	34	NN496916	MT,Sim
436	Ben Vane	01D: Inveraray to Crianlarich	Argyll and Bute	916	424	3,004	1,391	56	NN277098	Ma,M,Sim
437	Càrn Aosda	06B: Pitlochry to Braemar & Blairgowrie	Aberdeenshire	915	120	3,003	394	43	NO133791	Hu,M,Sim
438	Sgurr Dubh	14A: Loch Maree to Loch Broom	Highland	915	49	3,003	160	19	NH060729	MT,Sim
439	Stuc a' Choire Dhuibh Bhig	13A: Loch Torridon to Loch Maree	Highland	915	83	3,002	272	25	NG942582	MT,Sim
440	Stob Coire na Cloiche	11A: Loch Duich to Cannich	Highland	915	37	3,002	121	25 33	NH075227	MT,Sim
441	Beinn Teallach	09C: Loch Lochy to Loch Laggan	Highland	915	301	3,001	988	34 41	NN361859	Ma,M,Sim,xC
442	Càrn na Caim South Top	05B: Loch Ericht to Glen Tromie & Glen Garry	Highland/ Perth and Kinross	915	30	3,001	100	42	NN663806	MT,Sim

== Bibliography ==
- Alan Dawson (1995). The Murdos (TACit Tables). TACit Press. ISBN 978-0952268031.

== DoBIH codes ==
The DoBIH uses the following codes for the various classifications of mountains and hills in the British Isles, which many of the above peaks also fall into:

- Ma Marilyn
- Hu HuMP
- Sim Simm
- 5 Dodd
- M Munro
- MT Munro Top
- F Furth
- C Corbett
- G Graham
- D Donald
- DT Donald Top
- Hew Hewitt
- N Nuttall
- Dew Dewey
- DDew Donald Dewey
- HF Highland Five
- 4 400-499m Tump
- 3 300-399m Tump (GB)
- 2 200-299m Tump (GB)
- 1 100-199m Tump (GB)
- 0 0-99m Tump (GB)
- W Wainwright
- WO Wainwright Outlying Fell
- B Birkett
- Sy Synge
- Fel Fellranger
- CoH County Top – Historic (pre-1974)
- CoA County Top – Administrative (1974 to mid-1990s)
- CoU County Top – Current County or Unitary Authority
- CoL County Top – Current London Borough
- SIB Significant Island of Britain
- Dil Dillon
- A Arderin
- VL Vandeleur-Lynam
- MDew Myrddyn Dewey
- O Other list (which includes):
  - Bin Binnion
  - Bg Bridge
  - BL Buxton & Lewis
  - Ca Carn
  - CT Corbett Top
  - GT Graham Top
  - Mur Murdo
  - P500 P500
  - P600 P600
- Un unclassified

prefixes:
- s sub
- x deleted

== See also ==
- Lists of mountains and hills in the British Isles
- List of mountains of the British Isles by height
- Lists of mountains and hills in the British Isles
- Lists of mountains in Ireland
- List of Munro mountains
- List of Corbett mountains
- List of Graham mountains
- List of Donald mountains
- List of Furth mountains in the British Isles
- List of P600 mountains in the British Isles
- List of Marilyns in the British Isles
