= Ben Lomond =

Scottish mountain

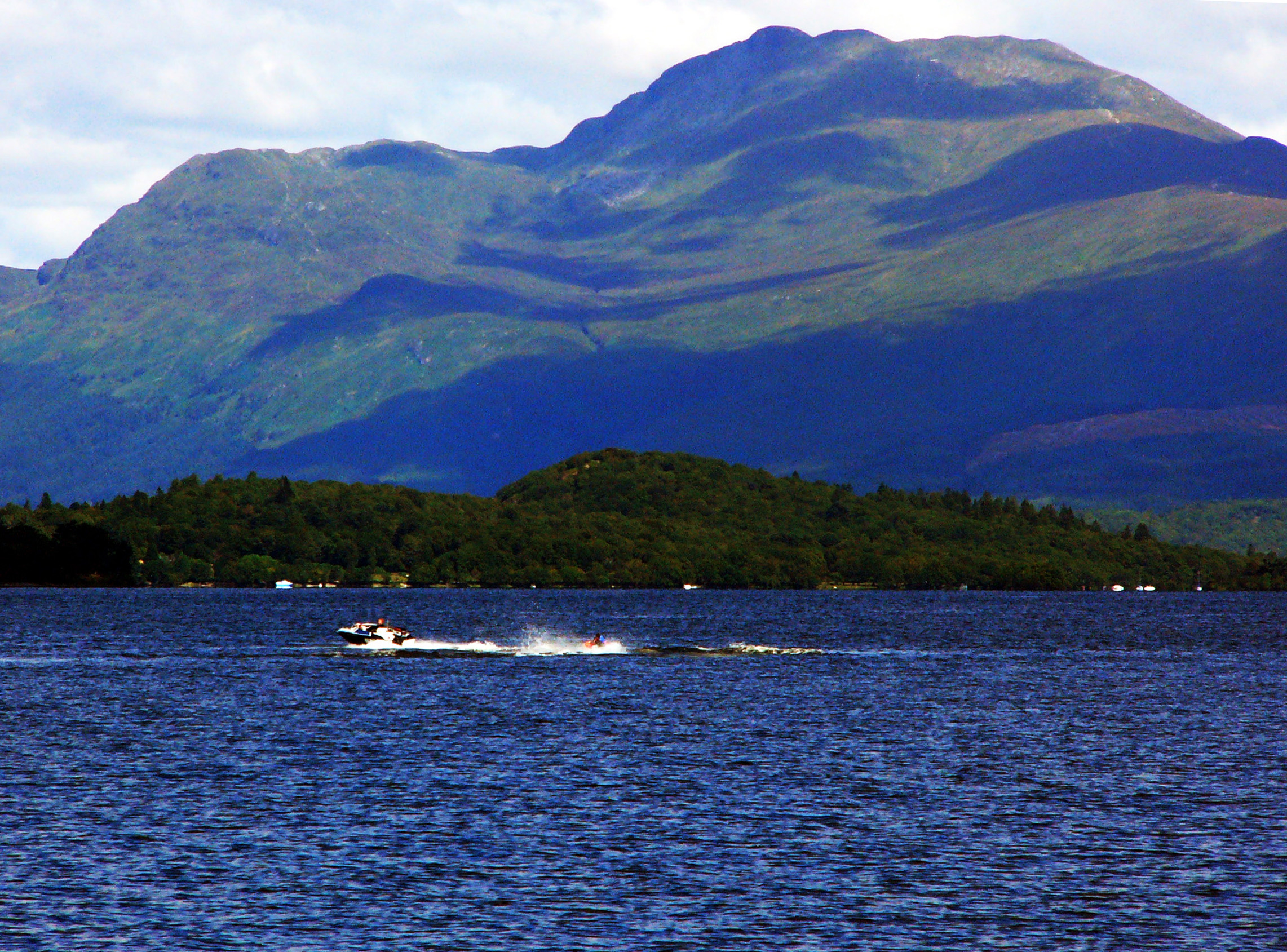
- Ben Lomond from Loch Lomond

Highest point
- Elevation: 974 m (3,196 ft)
- Prominence: 820 m (2,690 ft) Ranked 30th in British Isles
- Parent peak: Beinn Ime
- Listing: Munro, Marilyn, County top (Stirlingshire)
- Coordinates: 56°11′26″N 4°37′59″W

Naming
- Native name: Beinn Laomainn (Scottish Gaelic)
- English translation: Beacon mountain
- Pronunciation: Scottish Gaelic: [peɲ ˈl̪ˠɯːmɪɲ]

Geography
- Location within Scotland
- Location: Loch Lomond, Scotland
- Parent range: Grampian Mountains
- OS grid: NN367029
- Topo map(s): OS Landranger 56 and Explorer 364

Ben Lomond (Scottish Gaelic: Beinn Laomainn, lit. 'Beacon Mountain'), 974 metres (3,196 ft), is a mountain in the Scottish Highlands. Situated on the eastern shore of Loch Lomond, it is the most southerly of the Munros. Ben Lomond lies within the Ben Lomond National Memorial Park and the Loch Lomond and The Trossachs National Park, property of the National Trust for Scotland.

Its accessibility from Glasgow and elsewhere in central Scotland, together with the relative ease of ascent from Rowardennan, makes it one of the most popular of all the Munros: it is estimated that around 30,000 people reach the summit each year. On a clear day, it is visible from the higher grounds of Glasgow and across Strathclyde. Ben Lomond's summit can also be seen from Ben Nevis, the highest peak in Britain, over 40 miles (64 km) away. The West Highland Way runs along the western base of the mountain, by the loch.

Ben Lomond's popularity in Scotland has resulted in several namesakes in the former British colonies Australia, Canada, New Zealand, Jamaica, Trinidad and Tobago, and the United States – see this list. The mountain is mentioned directly in the popular folk song "The Bonnie Banks o' Loch Lomond".

== Etymology ==
The name Ben Lomond is generally agreed to mean "beacon mountain" or "beacon hill". Lomond is of Brittonic origin and derived from the element lumon meaning "a beacon" (Welsh llumon). This element, preserved in Scots as lum meaning "chimney", is found in other hill-names such as the Lomond Hills in Fife and Pumlumon in Wales. Like these hills, Ben Lomond is likely to have been perceived as a central point, probably the meeting-point of several territorial boundaries, where a signal beacon may have been frequently li,., although in modern parlance the mountain's close proximity to Glasgow and the fact that its summit can be seen from parts of the city on a clear day marks it as a beacon of the Highlands to Clydesiders.

== Geography and geology ==
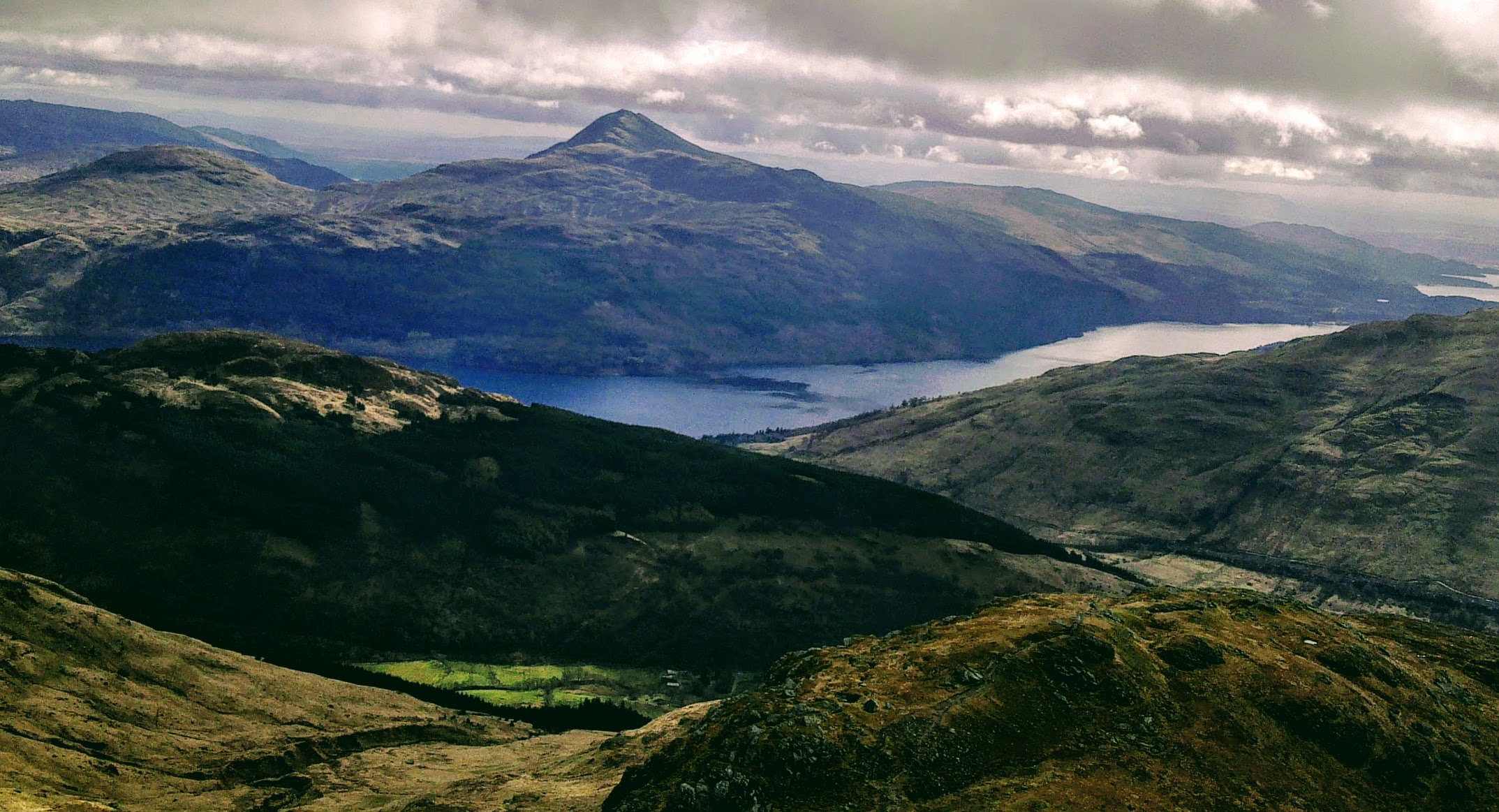
Ben Lomond above Loch Lomond, as seen from the slopes of Beinn Narnain.

Ben Lomond has a craggy summit which appears conical when viewed from the nearby Arrochar Alps range. The mountain comprises two parallel south-southeasterly ridges: the Sròn Aonaich ridge to the east where its highest point stands at 577-metre (1,893 ft) and the Ptarmigan ridge to the west with its highest point at 778-metre (2,552 ft). North of the summit these ridges come together and lead to a 456-metre (1,496 ft) col with Cruin a' Bheinn, a Graham standing at 632.5-metre (2,075 ft). The summit is grassy and rocky and is marked by a triangulation pillar.

Ben Lomond's geology is dominated by granite, mica schist, diorite, porphyry and quartzite. Ben Lomond lies on the Scottish watershed, the drainage divide which separates river systems that flow to the east from those that flow to the west.

== Ascent routes ==
The usual route up Ben Lomond is via the 'tourist path', a wide, eroded and easy path which is roughly paved in steeper sections. This track was created owing to the mountain's status as one of the most popular in Scotland and climbs the gentle Sròn Aonaich ridge, before ascending a steeper section to the rocky summit ridge.

An alternative route follows the Ptarmigan ridge to the summit along a steeper and rockier path. The Ptarmigan path is the second most popular route, followed by a third route which approaches from Gleann Dubh.

Despite the comparative ease of the tourist route, Ben Lomond can present a significant challenge to inexperienced walkers, especially in poor weather conditions. A dedicated Lomond Mountain Rescue Team has existed since 1967 to assist walkers and climbers on Ben Lomond and other surrounding peaks.

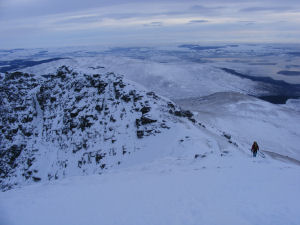
A walker descending by the tourist route, seen from the summit in January 2010.

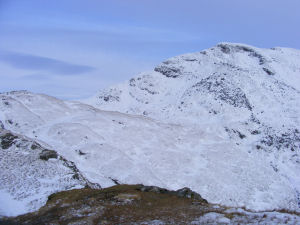
The summit of Ben Lomond seen from high on the Ptarmigan ridge in January 2010.

== Fauna ==
The higher regions of the mountain support an alpine tundra ecozone, hosting bird species including peregrine falcon, merlins, rock ptarmigan, red grouse and golden eagles. A study by the British Trust for Ornithology found that Ben Lomond may host the most southerly breeding ptarmigan population in Scotland, following the decline of populations on Goatfell and the Arran mountains, possibly as a result of climate change.

In addition to natural wildlife, the mountain area supports sheep farming. The National Trust for Scotland is tasked with maintaining a land management programme which sustains a balance of natural habitat conservation and the availability of land for grazing.

== Memorial Park and National Park ==
Ben Lomond Mountains, Scotland, an 1802 painting by J.M.W. Turner

Since 1995, the area around Ben Lomond, including the mountain summit, has been designated as a war memorial, called the Ben Lomond National Memorial Park. The park is dedicated to those who gave their lives in the First and Second World Wars and was created out of the former Rowardennan Estate with the support of the National Heritage Memorial Fund.

The Memorial Park was officially opened on Armistice Day in 1997 by the Rt Hon Donald Dewar, then Secretary of State for Scotland and later the first First Minister of Scotland. At the opening ceremony he unveiled a granite sculpture by Doug Cocker, a Scottish artist who had won a competition organised by the Scottish Sculpture Trust to design a permanent monument for the park.

At the time of its creation, management of the Memorial Park was entrusted to the NTS, Forestry Commission and the now defunct Scottish Office.

In 2002, the Scottish Parliament created the Loch Lomond and the Trossachs National Park, the first national park in Scotland. The national park includes the whole of Ben Lomond National Memorial Park.

== Panorama ==
In perfect viewing conditions the following Munros are visible (distances in miles, listed clockwise from north):

1. [N] Beinn Challuim (18)
2. An Caisteal (10)
3. Creag Mhor (21)
4. Beinn Heasgarnaich (22)
5. Beinn a' Chroin (10)
6. Ben Alder (44)
7. Cruach Ardrain (12)
8. Stuchd an Lochain (27)
9. Beinn Tulaichean (11)
10. Ben More (14)
11. Stob Binnein (13)
12. Meall Ghaordaidh (25)
13. [NNE] Carn Gorm (34)
14. Meall nan Tarmachan (26)
15. Meall Corranaich (28)
16. An Stuc (30)
17. Meall Garbh (31)
18. Beinn Ghlas (28)
19. Ben Lawers (29)
20. Meall Greigh (32)
21. Braigh Coire Chruinn Bhalgain (56)
22. Beinn a' Ghlo (58)
23. Carn an Righ (62)
24. Glas Tulaichean (62)
25. Carn a' Gheoidh (65)
26. The Cairnwell (67)
27. Carn an t-Sagairt Mor (73)
28. Carn an Tuirc (70)
29. Carn a' Choire Bhoidheach (74)
30. Lochnagar (75)
31. [NE] Ben Chonzie (31)
32. Ben Vorlich (Loch Earn) (19)
33. Stuc a' Chroin (18)
34. [W] Ben More (Mull) (56)
35. Beinn Narnain (6)
36. [WNW] Beinn Ime (8)
37. Ben Vane (7)
38. Ben Cruachan (25)
39. Beinn Bhuidhe (14)
40. Stob Diamh (24)
41. [NW] Beinn a' Chochuill (25)
42. Beinn Eunaich (24)
43. Ben Vorlich (Loch Lomond) (7)
44. Beinn Sgulaird (33)
45. Ben Starav (29)
46. Beinn a' Bheithir (38)
47. Beinn nan Aighenan (27)
48. Glas Bheinn Mhor (28)
49. Sgurr na h-Ulaidh (34)
50. Beinn a' Chleibh (16)
51. Stob Coir' an Albannaich (29)
52. Ben Lui (16)
53. Sgorr nam Fiannaidh (37)
54. Mullach nan Coirean (42)
55. Buachaille Etive Beag (34)
56. [NNW] Ben Oss (15)
57. Stob Ghabhar (28)
58. Ben Nevis (44)
59. Creise (31)
60. Beinn Dubhchraig (15)
61. Aonach Beag (Ben Nevis) (44)
62. Meall a' Bhuiridh (30)
63. Binnein Beag (41)
64. Sgurr Eilde Mor (40)
65. Sgurr Choinnich Mor (44)
66. Stob Coire an Laoigh (44)
67. Stob Choire Claurigh (45)
68. Stob Ban (Grey Corries) (44)
69. Beinn Dorain (22)
70. Beinn an Dothaidh (24)
71. Stob Coire Easain (44)
72. Stob a' Choire Mheadhoin (44)
73. Beinn Achaladair (25)
74. Beinn Chabhair (9)
75. Beinn a' Chreachain (26)

The most distant point visible is Knocklayd in the Antrim Hills, 95 miles distant.
