= Meall Glas =

Mountain in the southern highlands of Scotland

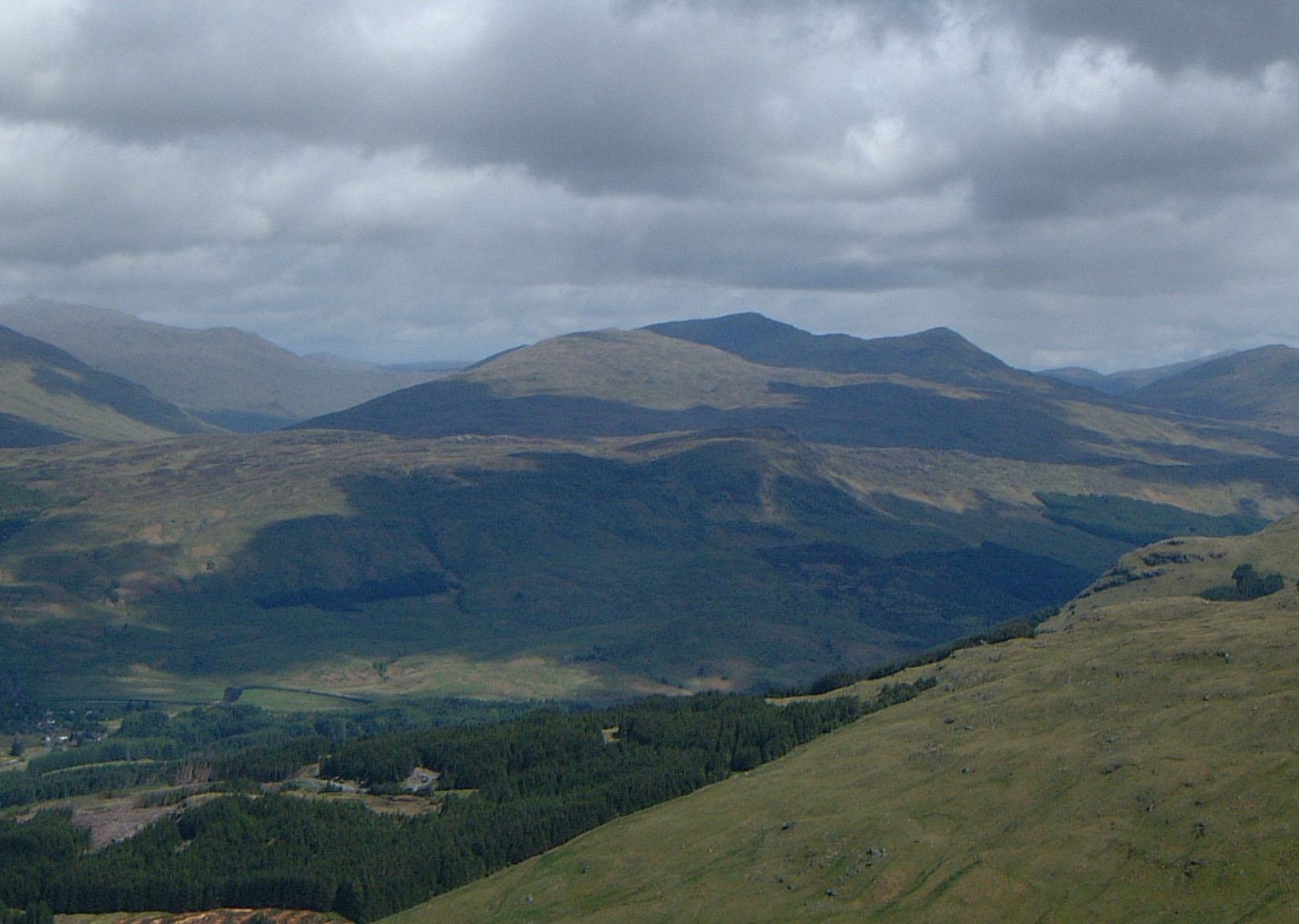
- The Meall Glas group of hills from the high ground above Crianlarich, 9 km to the SW. Meall Glas is the highest peak in shade.

Highest point
- Elevation: 959 m (3,146 ft)
- Prominence: 554 m (1,818 ft)
- Parent peak: Beinn Heasgarnich
- Listing: Munro, Marilyn
- Coordinates: 56°27′21″N 4°32′49″W

Naming
- English translation: Greenish-grey hill
- Language of name: Gaelic
- Pronunciation: Scottish Gaelic: [ˈmjaul̪ˠ ˈkl̪ˠas̪]

Geography
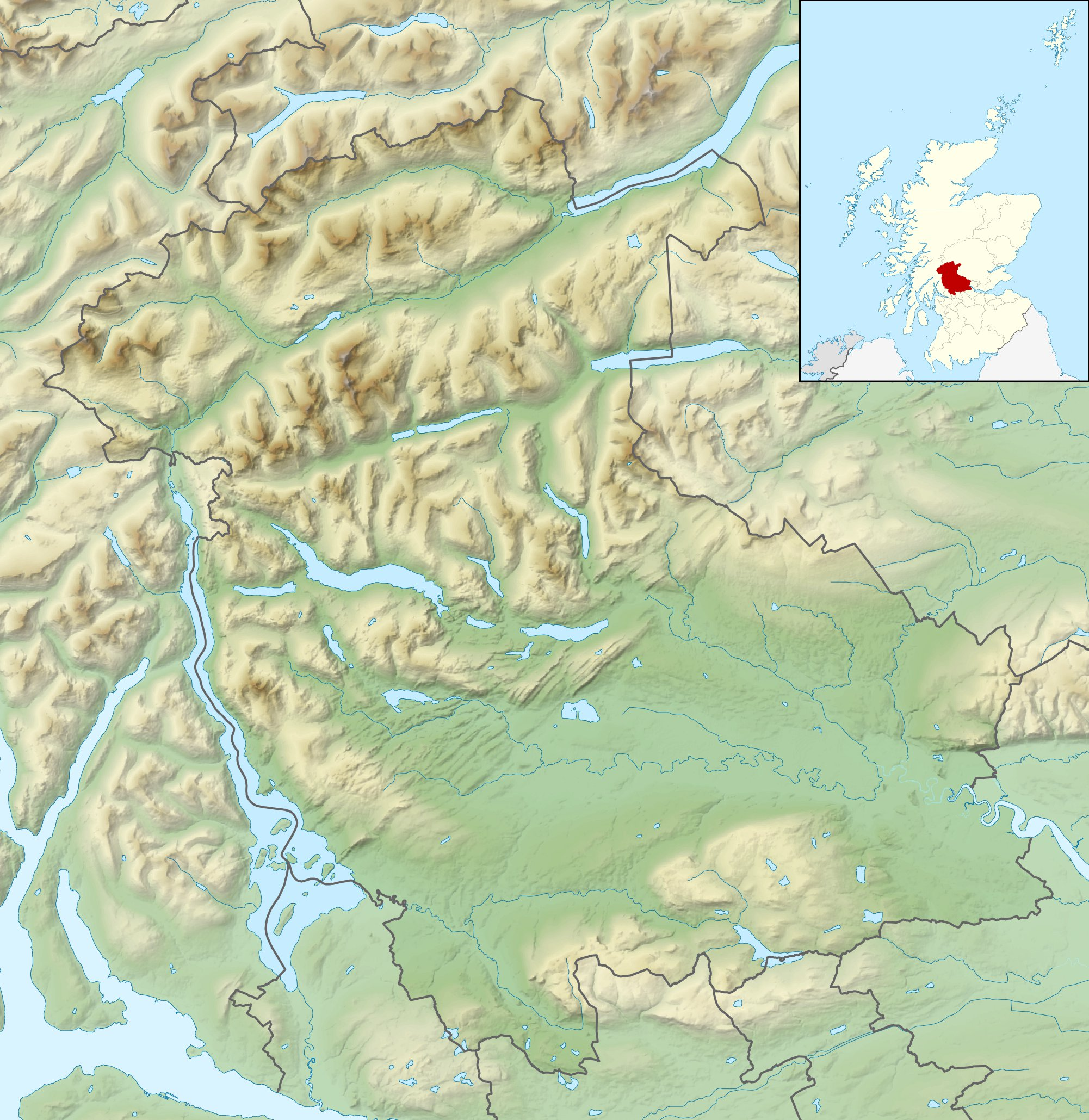
- Location within Stirling
- Location: Stirlingshire, Scotland
- Parent range: Grampians
- OS grid: NN431321
- Topo map: OS Landranger 51, OS Explorer 378

Listed summits of Meall Glas
Name	Grid ref	Height	Status
Beinn Cheathaich	NN444326	937 m (3,074 ft)	Munro Top

Meall Glas is a mountain situated in the southern highlands of Scotland. It stands on the northern border of the Loch Lomond and the Trossachs National Park, 8.5 kilometres north east of Crianlarich.

== Overview ==
Meall Glas has Munro status with a height of 959 metres (3,146 ft). It is the highest point of the high rolling uplands between Glen Lochay and Glen Dochart, an area lacking distinctive mountainous character. Another Munro, Sgiath Chuil, lies 2 km to the east; the Corbett Beinn nan Imirean is 2 km to the south west. The three hills can be climbed together in the same walk.

Meall Glas is overshadowed by the more impressive mountains around Crianlarich. Its name, which translates from the Gaelic as “Greenish-grey hill” suggests its topographic character. It was probably named by the inhabitants of Glen Lochay to which it shows its more impressive northern outline, with the summit ridge seen as a curving hollow. The hill is not well seen from Glen Dochart to the south, from where it is usually climbed, being observed as merely the top of rising moorland.

== Geography ==
Meall Glas comprises mainly rolling grassy slopes, with two main ridges. The north west ridge drops from the summit to Glen Lochay and can be used as an ascent route. The other ridge curves east round the lip of Coire Cheathaich, passing over an unnamed top at 908m before swinging north east to the Munro Top of Beinn Cheathaich (937 metres), 1.5 km from the main peak. In Sir Hugh Munro’s original tables of 1891, Beinn Cheathaich was listed as the Munro with Meall Glas as the “Top”, an error rectified in the 1921 revision. From Beinn Cheathaich the ridge swings north and drops to Glen Lochay. Broad slopes to the east descend to the Lairig a’ Churain (609 metres) which connects to the adjacent Munro of Sgiath Chuil.

The mountain is made up of schist rocks of the Dalradian group, with outcrops of pink granite on the mountain's upper slopes. The south side of the mountain has a broad shelf at a height of around 450 metres, the result of lateral erosion by glaciers in the Ice Age. Rainfall on Meall Glas drains to the east coast of Scotland via the glens of Dochart (south) or Lochay (north) and then by Loch Tay and the River Tay.

== Ascents and view ==
Meall Glas can be climbed from either Glen Dochart or Glen Lochay. The southern approach from Glen Dochart is the most popular because of ease of access by car. The route starts at Auchessan (grid reference NN446276) on the A85 road and goes north across moorland to reach the summit ridge just to the east of the highest point. The northern approach starts at the road end in Glen Lochay at Kenknock (grid reference NN465364). The route proceeds for 1.5 km west up the glen, crosses the River Lochay by a ford (the bridge no longer exists) and follows a track by the Lubchurran Burn which goes south and west and before reaching the summit via the Top of Beinn Cheathaich.

The summit of Meall Glas is marked by a small cairn perched on a rocky outcrop. The mountain has a considerable prominence of 554 metres and is a good viewpoint, with the Mamlorn peaks around the head of Glen Lochay and the Crianlarich hills to the south west looking especially fine.
