= Ben Starav =

1078m high mountain in Highland, Scotland, UK

- Beinn Starabh
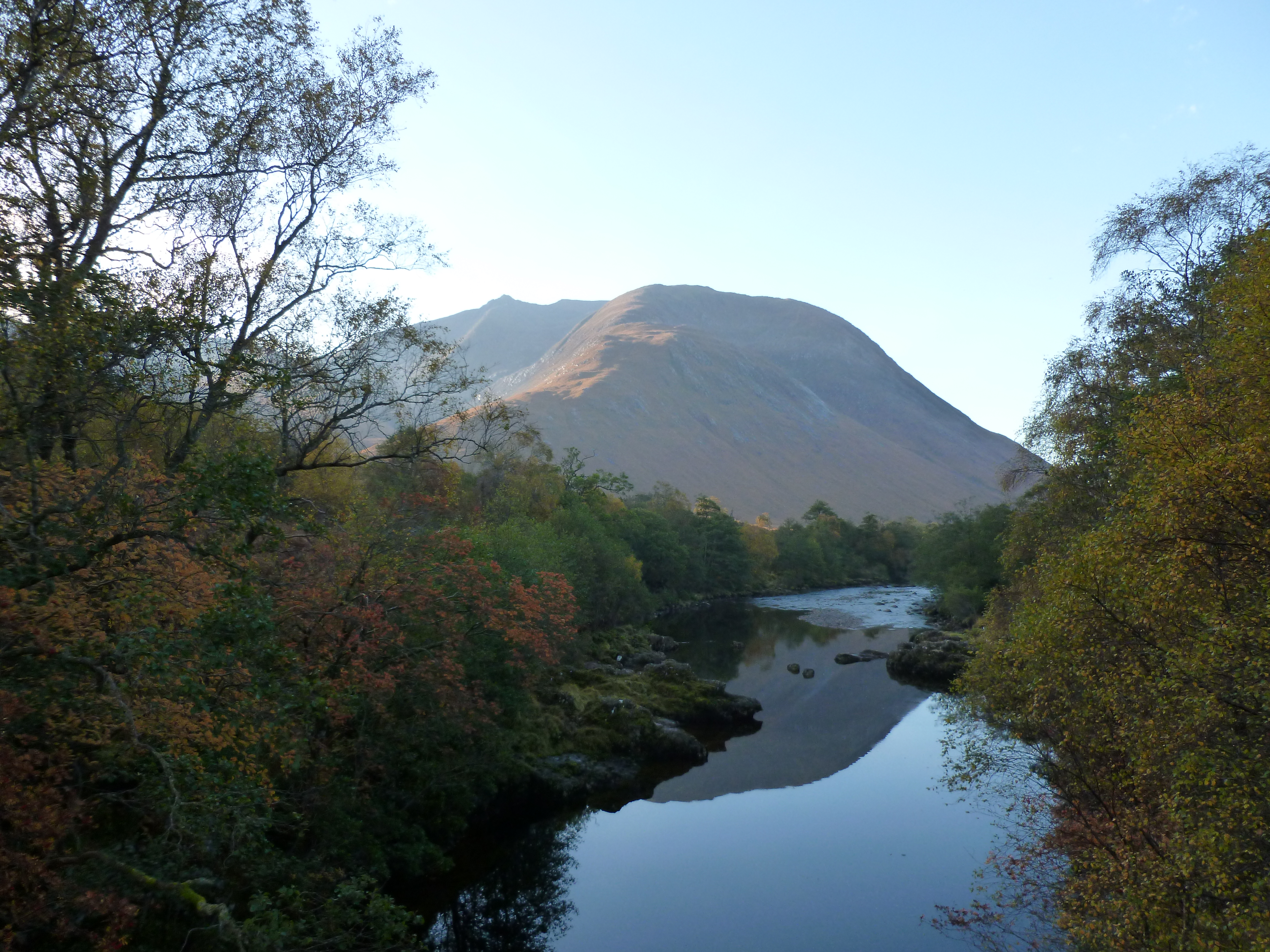
- Ben Starav over Glen Etive

Highest point
- Elevation: 1,078 m (3,537 ft)
- Prominence: 446 m (1,463 ft)
- Listing: Munro, Marilyn
- Coordinates: 56.5388°N 5.0499°W

Geography
- Location: Argyll, Scotland
- Parent range: Grampian Mountains

Ben Starav (Scottish Gaelic: Beinn Starabh) is a mountain in the Lorn region of Argyll, in the Scottish Highlands. It is a Munro that rises 1,078 metres (3,537 ft) above Loch Etive (a sea loch) at its western foot. Its peak is surrounded by several ridges, steep corries and waterfalls. It is the highest in a group of mountains that includes Glas Bheinn Mhòr, Beinn nan Aighenan and Stob Coir' an Albannaich.

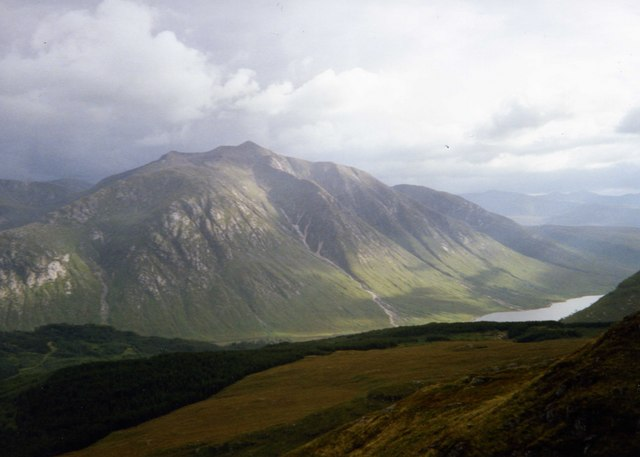
Ben Starav from the lower slopes of Beinn Fhionniaidh
