= Tom a' Chòinich =

1112 m high mountain in Scotland in Glen Affric

- An Tom Còinnich
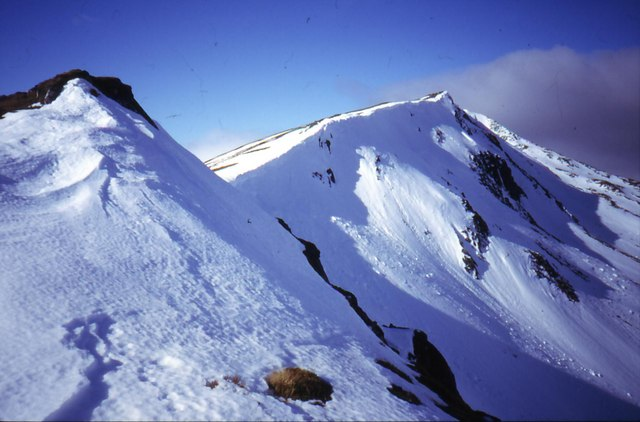
- Tom a' Chòinich (right), looking up along its southeast ridge from Creag na h-Inghinn

Highest point
- Elevation: 1,112 m (3,648 ft)
- Prominence: 149 m (489 ft)
- Parent peak: Càrn Eige
- Listing: Munro, Murdo
- Coordinates: 57°17′56″N 5°03′01″W

Naming
- English translation: mossy hillock
- Language of name: Gaelic

Geography
- Location within Highland
- Location: Glen Affric, Scotland
- Parent range: Northwest Highlands
- OS grid: NH164273
- Topo map: OS Landranger 25

Tom a' Chòinich (Scottish Gaelic: An Tom Còinnich) is a mountain in the Northwest Highlands of Scotland. It is a Munro with a height of 1,112 metres (3,648 ft). Glen Affric is to the south and Loch Mullardoch to the north. Less than 1 kilometre (0.5 mi) to the west is the 1,032-metre (3,386 ft) Munro Top called Tom a' Chòinich Beag (NH158273). Its prominence is 149 metres (489 ft) with its parent peak, Càrn Eige, about 4 kilometres (2.5 mi) to the west. This mountain should not be confused with the 955-metre (3,133 ft) Munro Top also called Tom a' Chòinnich near Ben Wyvis.

Although the mountain can be climbed from Glen Cannich, an approach from Glen Affric is more straightforward using a path that goes northwest from the north shore of Loch Beinn a' Mheadhoin following Gleann nam Fiadh upstream. This path crosses Bealach Toll Easa which used to be the pass on the route from Affric Lodge to Benula Lodge before the latter was inundated by the creation of the reservoir at Loch Mullardoch. The southeast ridge is more direct but it is rocky at its lower levels.

== See also ==
- List of Munro mountains
- Mountains and hills of Scotland
