= Glas Bheinn Mhòr (Munro) =

Mountain in Highland, Scotland

Glas Bheinn Mhor
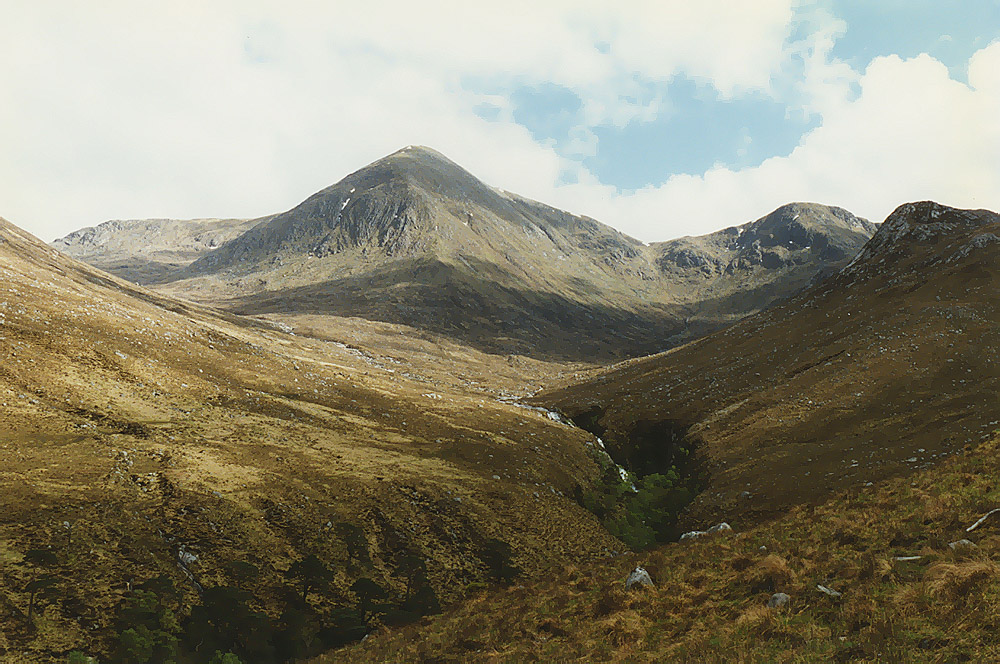
- Glas Bheinn Mhor

Highest point
- Elevation: 997 m (3,271 ft)
- Prominence: 231 m (758 ft)
- Listing: Munro, Marilyn
- Coordinates: 56°32′33″N 5°00′18″W

Geography
- Location: Argyll and Bute / Highland, Scotland
- Parent range: Grampian Mountains
- OS grid: NN153429
- Topo map: OS Landranger 50

Glas Bheinn Mhor (997 m) is a mountain in the Grampian Mountains of Scotland, south of Glen Etive. The Argyll and Bute and Highland border straddles its summit.

A conical mountain, it forms part of the Ben Starav range and lies east of the mighty Ben Starav itself. Climbs usually start from Glen Etive and the nearest village is Taynuilt to the south.
