= Sgùrr na h-Ulaidh =

Coordinates: 56°37′00″N 5°04′00″W

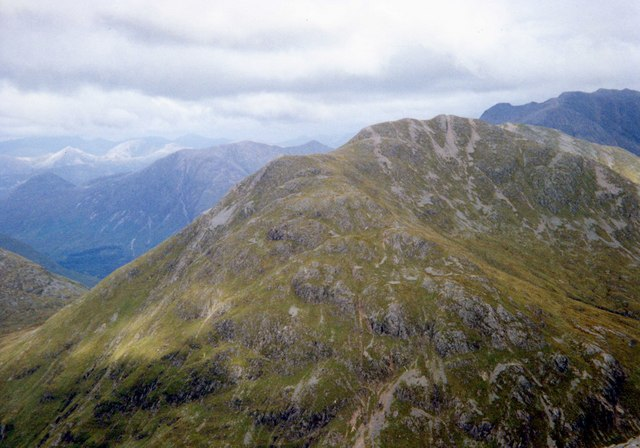
- Sgùrr na h-Ulaidh from Beinn Fhionnlaidh, with Bidean nam Bian and Stob Coire nam Beith (right) and Sgorr na Ciche (left)

Highest point
- Elevation: 994 m (3,261 ft)
- Prominence: 415 m (1,362 ft)
- Parent peak: Bidean nam Bian
- Listing: Munro, Marilyn

Naming
- English translation: Peak of the Treasure
- Language of name: Scottish Gaelic

Geography
- Location: Glen Coe, Scotland
- OS grid: NN111518
- Topo map(s): OS Landranger 41 and 50

Climbing
- Easiest route: Hike

Sgùrr na h-Ulaidh (also Sgòr na h-Ulaidh) ("Peak of the Treasure") is a mountain lying to the south of the village of Glencoe in the Scottish Highlands. The mountain cannot be seen from the main A82 road as it is hidden behind Aonach Dubh a'Ghlinne.

== Ascent ==
The usual route of ascent is from Glen Coe, approximately 2 km west of Loch Achtriochtan. A track on the west of Allt na Muidhe is followed and after 1 km the burn is crossed. The east side of the burn is then followed for about 3 km until a turn east is made to climb to the ridge just north of the top of Stob an Fhuarain. This peak is climbed, then the steep, rocky ridge is followed trending south-west to the summit of Sgùrr na h-Ulaidh.

A route that avoids the steep ground on the north side of the mountain can be made from the southern Glen Etive side.
