= Creag Mhòr =

Mountain of the Scottish Highlands

Coordinates: 56°29′20″N 4°36′50″W

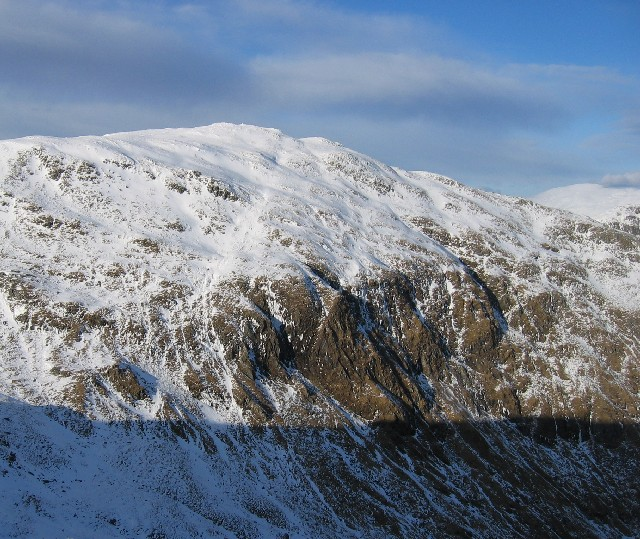
- Creag Mhòr summit showing its southern cliffs

Highest point
- Elevation: 1,047 m (3,435 ft)
- Prominence: 393 m (1,289 ft)
- Listing: Munro, Marilyn

Naming
- English translation: big rocky hill
- Language of name: Gaelic
- Pronunciation: Scottish Gaelic: [ˈkʰɾʲek ˈvoːɾ]

Geography
- Location: Breadalbane, Scotland
- Parent range: Grampians
- OS grid: NN391360
- Topo map: OS Landranger 50, 51 OS Explorer 378

Listed summits of Creag Mhòr
Name	Grid ref	Height	Status
Stob nan Clach	NN387351	956 m (3137 ft)	Munro Top

Creag Mhòr is a mountain in the Breadalbane region of the Scottish Highlands. It is in the Forest of Mamlorn, ten kilometres northeast of Tyndrum, and is one of the remotest of the southern Highlands Creag Mhòr reaches a height of 1047 metres (3435 ft) and qualifies as a Munro and a Marilyn. It is often climbed with the neighbouring Munro of Beinn Heasgarnich; the two mountains form the high ground between Glen Lochay and Loch Lyon.

== Landscape ==
Creag Mhòr comes from Gaelic and means "big rocky hill", referring to a series of rocky buttresses near the summit. Creag Mhòr is composed of three ridges, the ESE ridge (Sròn nan Eun) descends to Glen Lochay at the habitation of Batavaime and gives the usual route of ascent from that glen. Another ridge also descends to Glen Lochay, this initially goes south from the summit before swinging SE down steep slopes, which need care, to reach the glen. These two ridges enclose Coire Cheathaich (Misty Corrie), a former royal hunting ground which was made famous by Duncan Ban MacIntyre, the Scottish Gaelic poet who worked as a gamekeeper in the area. He wrote the poem Òran Coire a' Cheathaich (Song of the misty corrie) which gives a natural description of the corrie and its flora and fauna and includes the line "'S rìomhach còta na Creige Mòire" (lovely is the coat of Creag Mhòr).

The south ridge includes the subsidiary summit of Stob nan Clach (956 m) which is listed as a top in Munro's Tables and is reached from the main summit by contouring round the head of Coire Cheathaich for a kilometre. A third ridge on the mountain goes north over the 895 metre subsidiary top of Meall Tionail (Hill of the Gathering) before dropping down to Glen Lyon. This north ridge can be used for access to or from Beinn Heasgarnich, as the ridge can be left after a short distance and Heasgarnich can be reached by going east over the boggy Bealach na Baintighearna (654 m). All rainfall on Creag Mhòr drains to the east coast of Scotland at the Firth of Tay, either via Glen Lyon or Glen Lochay.

Meall Tionail has an unusual geographic feature on its western slopes, it is marked on OS maps as Coire Chirdle, however it is not a corrie in the usual sense as there is no hollow cavity in the mountain. Instead there is a clearly marked semi circle (see picture) called an arcuate scarp below which is a bulge. This was probably created after the last ice age when the unstable hillside saturated by meltwater slipped down the steep slope. The nationally rare plant Bartsia Alpina grows on the slopes of Creag Mhòr, it is found as high as 950 metres, the highest occurrence in the U.K. It grows on brown loam soil on the mountains alkaline mica-schist rock.

== Climbing ==
Creag Mhòr is a rather isolated mountain and approaches require quite long walks to reach the foot of the hill. Ascents are possible from both the east and the west with the eastern approach from the road end in Glen Lochay being the most popular with guide book writers. This eastern approach starts at Kenknock (grid reference NN465364) which is now the farthest it is possible to drive up Glen Lochay with locked gates stopping cars from going any further, however it is viable to use a mountain bike. It is a six kilometre journey west up the glen to reach Batavaime at the foot of the SE ridge from where the mountain can be climbed.

The approach from the west starts at Auch (grid reference NN323354) on the A82 and goes under the viaduct of the West Highland Line, then SE up Glen Coralan and over the Corbett of Cam Chreag to reach Creag Mhòr. If continuing to Beinn Heasgarnich from the summit, a direct line NE is not recommended because the hillside is steep and rocky, instead use the north ridge as mentioned before heading east to the col between the two mountains to avoid dangerous ground.
