= Glas Tulaichean =

Mountain in Perth and Kinross, Scotland

Coordinates: 56.865757°N 3.558163°W

- An Glas-Thulchan
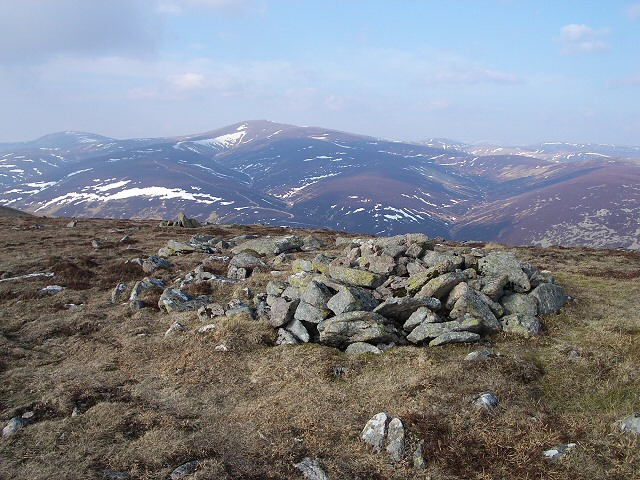
- Glen Tulaichean viewed from Meall a Choire Bhuidhe

Highest point
- Elevation: 1,051 m (3,448 ft)
- Prominence: 384 m (1,260 ft)
- Listing: Munro

Naming
- English translation: Grey-Green Hillocks
- Language of name: Gaelic
- Pronunciation: Scottish Gaelic: [ˈkl̪ˠas̪ ˈt̪ʰul̪ˠɪçən]

Geography
- Location: Perth and Kinross, Scotland
- OS grid: NO05107600
- Topo map: OS Landranger 43.

Climbing
- Easiest route: Hike

Glas Tulaichean (Scottish Gaelic: An Glas-Thulchan) is a large, complex mountain in the Mounth, Scotland. It is about 18 kilometres (11 mi) south of Braemar in Perth and Kinross. It is the highest of a group of domed hills which lie in remote land between the head of Glen Tilt and Glen Shee to the east. It is most commonly climbed from the Spittal of Glenshee via Glen Lochsie to the south.

== Geography ==
At 1,051 metres (3,448 ft) Glas Tulaichean is a Munro and is ranked as the 79th highest mountain in Scotland. The mountain is bounded by Gleann Mòr to the North, Glen Lochsie to the South and Gleann Taitneach to the East. On the east and south side a series of ridges radiate out from the summit, whilst the north western side drops steeply down into Gleann Mòr. On the east side three pronounced ridges enclose two corries, Glas Choire Bheag and Glas Choire Mhor, which drop into Gleann Taitneach. The southern slopes are less steep with grassy ridges descending into Glen Lochsie.

== Ascent ==
The most common route of ascent is from the south where a vehicular track ascends gentle slopes from Glen Lochsie almost to the summit cairn. The dismantled Dalmunzie Railway line runs from the Dalmunzie Hotel close to the Spittal of Glenshee and this forms a good path through Glen Lochsie to the ruin of the Glenlochsie Lodge. From here the vehicular track continues up Breac-reidh, the southern ridge of Glas Tulaichean, to reach the summit cairn.

The remoteness of the area means that the neighbouring Munros of Càrn an Rìgh and Beinn Iutharn Mhòr are often combined with Glas Tulaichean.

== Natural heritage ==
Glas Tulaichean is a site of special scientific interest - protected for its outstanding representation of upland flowering plants. Scottish Natural Heritage's site management statement for the site reads -

"The geology consists of acid rocks with limestone outcropping in the northernmost extremity of Glas Choire Bheag, and underlying the southern side of Gleann Mor.

With the exception of the ridges, the SSSI boundary follows the 800m contour in Gleann Mor, the 760m contour in Glas Choire Bheag and Glas Choire Mhor, and the 840m contour on the south and west sides of the site.

The high altitude areas support habitats and species which are particularly well adapted to this hostile environment. The site is notified as an SSSI because of the number of rare arctic-alpine vascular plant species. The outcrops of limestone in Glas Choire Bheag are rich in plants. Until the population was recently increased by planting, there was only a single female bush of the woolly willow, one of only 11 known sites in the UK - the nearest population elsewhere is within Caenlochan Glen. There are a number of other rare plants, including the rare downy willow, as well as mosses and liverworts. These are mostly associated with rock outcrops and limestone soils but springs and flushes where lime-rich and snowbed vegetation occurs also hold more notable species.

Although not part of the notified features, there are extensive montane heaths which support breeding dotterel. The SSSI lies within the Cairngorms Massif Special Protection Area (SPA) which is designated for its breeding population of golden eagles."
