= Beinn Chabhair =

Scottish mountain

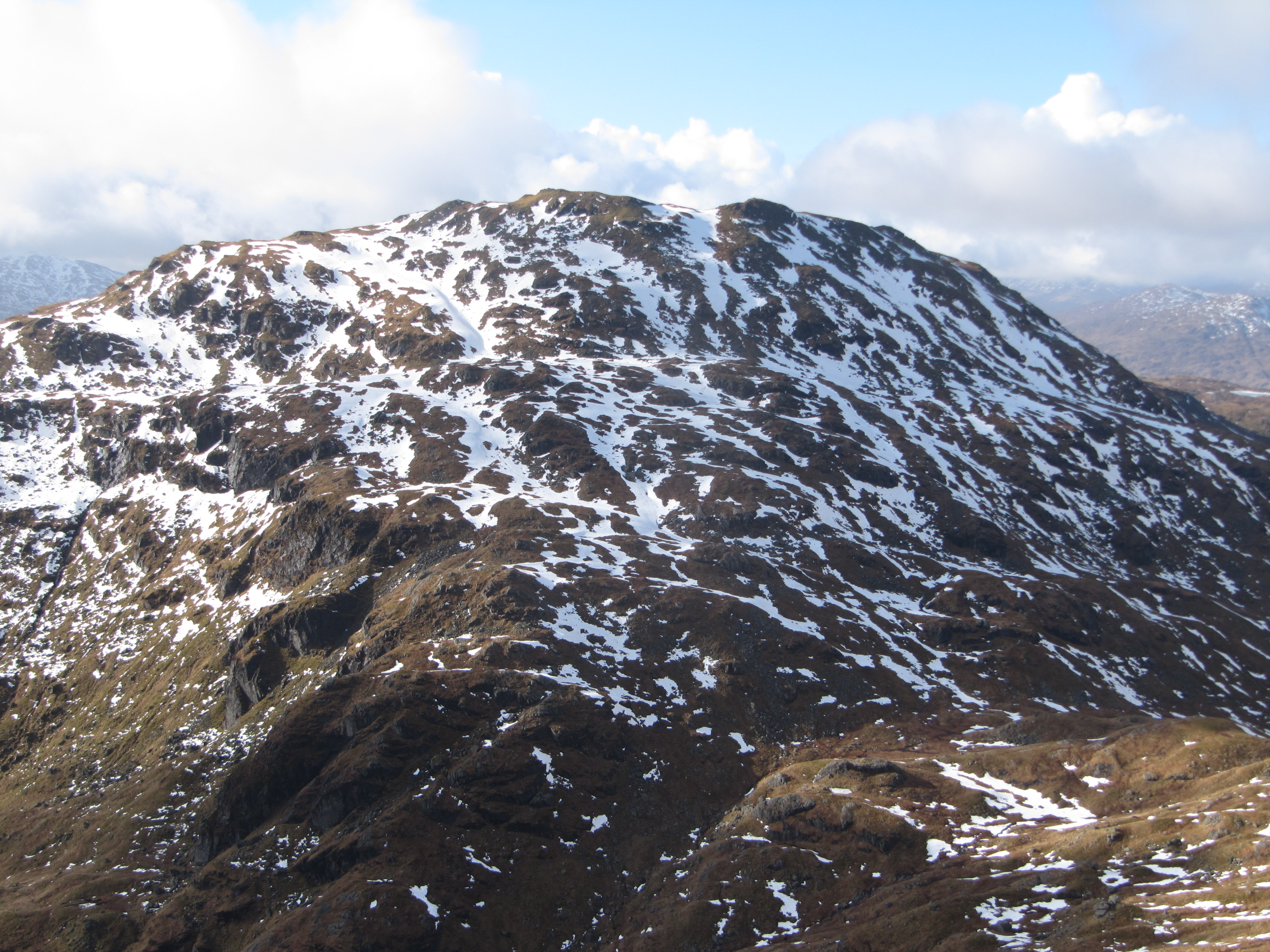
- Beinn Chabhair viewed from below Beinn a' Chroin

Highest point
- Elevation: 933 m (3,061 ft)
- Prominence: 314 m (1,030 ft)
- Parent peak: An Caisteal
- Listing: Munro, Marilyn
- Coordinates: 56°20′N 4°38′W

Naming
- English translation: Hill of the Hawk
- Language of name: Gaelic
- Pronunciation: Gaelic [ˈpeiɲ ə ˈxavɪɾʲ]

Geography
- Location: Stirling, Scotland
- Parent range: Grampian Mountains
- OS grid: NN36751793
- Topo map: OS Landranger 50

Climbing
- Easiest route: Hillwalking

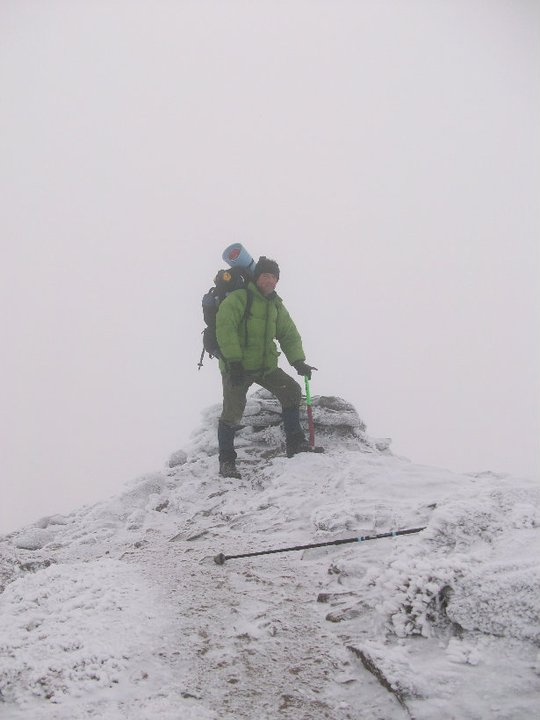

Beinn Chabhair (Gaelic: Beinn a' Chabhair) is a Scottish mountain. It has fine views down to Loch Lomond.

A common approach is from Inverarnan, up a steep eroded path beside the dramatic waterfalls of the Ben Glas Burn then finding a vague route across fairly level but very boggy moorland before walking up the hill itself and finding a way around a series of craggy outcrops to the summit.
