= Beinn Sgulaird =

Scottish mountain located between Glen Creran and Glen Etive in the southern highlands

Coordinates: 56.566085°N 5.168387°W

- Beinn Sguiliaird
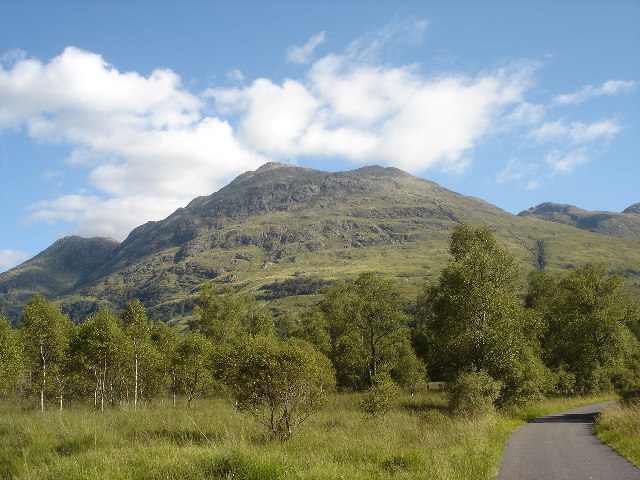
- Beinn Sgulaird from the road to Glen Ure House to the west

Highest point
- Elevation: 937 m (3,074 ft)
- Prominence: 662 m (2,172 ft)
- Listing: Munro, Marilyn

Naming
- Language of name: Gaelic
- Pronunciation: Scottish Gaelic: [peɲ ˈs̪kul̪ˠərˠtʲ] English approximation: bayn SKOO-lər-chə

Geography
- Location: Argyll and Bute, Scotland
- Parent range: Grampian Mountains
- OS grid: NN053460
- Topo map: OS Landranger 50, OS Explorer 377

Climbing
- Easiest route: walk

Beinn Sgulaird or Beinn Sguiliaird is a mountain in the Lorn region of the Scottish Highlands, between Glen Creran and Glen Etive. It has a height of 937 m (3074 ft) and is classed as a Munro. The mountain takes the form of a long ridge which runs from southwest to northeast, three kilometres of which lie above 800 m. Hillwalkers commonly traverse the ridge from north to south, as this gives the best views of the Hebrides to the west, in particular the Isle of Mull. While most walkers start from Glen Creran to the west, an ascent from Glen Etive is also possible.

== Climate ==
The climate is continental. The average temperature is 4 °C. The warmest month is July, at 12 °C, and the coldest is February, at −4 °C.
