= Beinn Iutharn Mhòr =

Mountain in Scotland

Beinn Iutharn Mhor
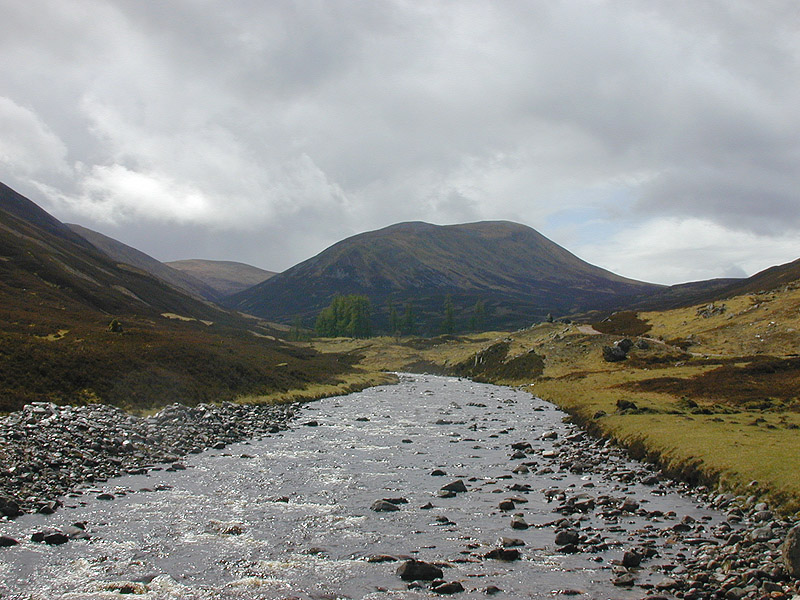
- Beinn Iutharn Mhor

Highest point
- Elevation: 1,045 m (3,428 ft)
- Prominence: 247 m (810 ft)
- Listing: Munro, Marilyn
- Coordinates: 56°53′42″N 3°34′06″W

Geography
- Location: Aberdeenshire / Perthshire, Scotland
- Parent range: Grampian Mountains
- OS grid: NO045792
- Topo map: OS Landranger 43

Beinn Iutharn Mhor (1,045 m) is a mountain in the Grampian Mountains of Scotland. It lies north of Glen Shee on the Aberdeenshire and Perthshire border.

A steep sided mountain in an otherwise rolling area of highland known as the Mounth, it is usually climbed from its northern Glen Ey side.
