= Beinn Tulaichean =

Scottish mountain

Coordinates: 56.34220°N 4.56285°W

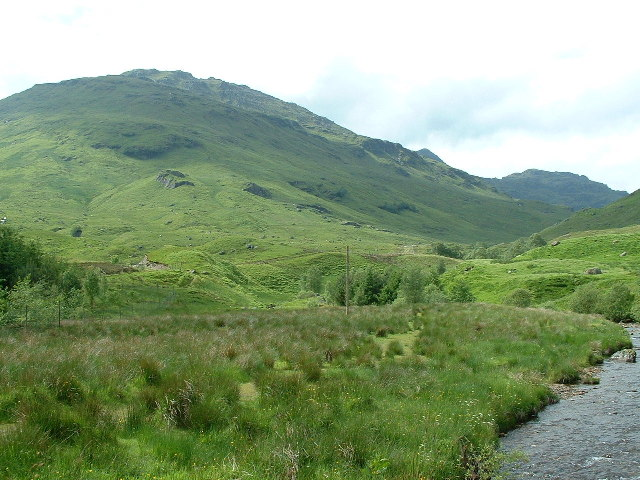
- View of Beinn Tulaichean from Inverlochraig Glen

Highest point
- Elevation: 946 m (3,104 ft)
- Prominence: 121 m (397 ft)
- Listing: Munro

Naming
- Native name: Beinn Thulaichean (Scottish Gaelic)
- English translation: Hill of Hillocks
- Pronunciation: Scottish Gaelic: [peɲ ˈhul̪ˠɪçən]

Geography
- Location: Stirling, Scotland
- Parent range: Grampian Mountains
- OS grid: NN41691960
- Topo map: OS Landranger 50, 56.

Climbing
- Easiest route: Hike

Beinn Tulaichean is a Scottish mountain. It is not much more than the southern top of Cruach Ardrain, with a descent of only 120m before the ascent to its larger neighbour. It is located approximately 10 km to the north of Loch Katrine close to the site of Robert Roy MacGregor's house.
