= Beinn Fhionnlaidh (Creran) =

Mountain in the West Highlands of Scotland

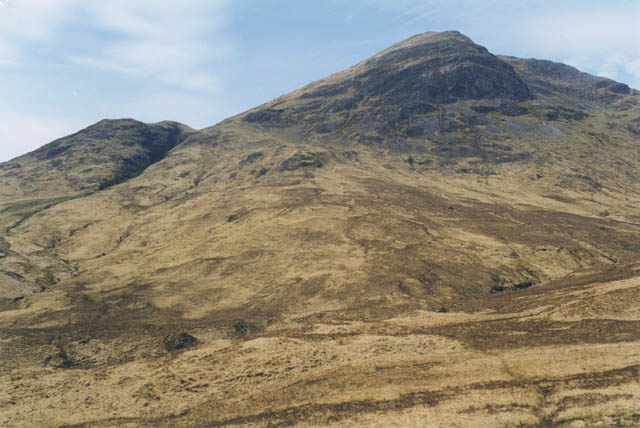
- Beinn Fhionnlaidh from the east

Highest point
- Elevation: 959 m (3,146 ft)
- Prominence: 510 m (1,670 ft)
- Listing: Munro, Marilyn
- Coordinates: 56°36′03″N 5°06′15″W

Naming
- English translation: Finlay's mountain
- Language of name: Gaelic

Geography
- Location within Argyll and Bute
- Location: Argyll, Scotland
- Parent range: Grampian Mountains
- OS grid: NN095497
- Topo map: OS Landranger 50, OS Explorer 384

Beinn Fhionnlaidh is a mountain in the West Highlands of Scotland. It is situated between Glen Etive and Glen Creran, to the south of Glen Coe.
