= Càrn a' Choire Bhoidheach =

Mountain in Scotland

Carn a' Choire Bhoidheach
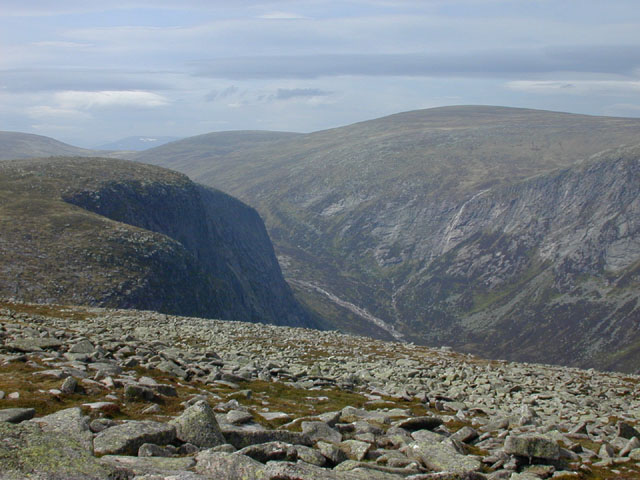
- A view of Carn a' Choire Bhoidheach from Broad Cairn

Highest point
- Elevation: 1,110 m (3,640 ft)
- Prominence: 75 m (246 ft)
- Parent peak: Lochnagar (Beinn Chìochan)
- Coordinates: 56°56′57.8″N 3°15′29.5″W

Naming
- English translation: Hill of the Beautiful Corrie

Geography
- Location within Scotland
- Location: Aberdeenshire, Scotland
- Country: United Kingdom
- Parent range: Grampian Mountains
- OS grid: NO226845

Càrn a' Choire Bhoidheach (Scottish Gaelic, meaning "Cairn of the Beautiful Corrie") is a mountain in the Cairngorms region of the Scottish Highlands. This munro is part of the Grampian Mountains. It reaches 1,110 metres (3,640 ft), with a prominence of 75 metres, and lies south-west of Lochnagar on the White Mounth plateau. The name of the mountain is first recorded on the Ordnance Survey six-inch map in 1869.

== Etymology ==
The name Càrn a' Choire Bhòidheach is derived from Scottish Gaelic and can be translated as "cairn of the beautiful corrie". Càrn refers to a cairn or hill marked by a pile of stones, coire denotes a corrie or cirque-shaped hollow typically formed by glacial action, and bhòidheach means beautiful or lovely. The name likely refers to the attractive corrie formations on the mountain's northern flanks, particularly those associated with the nearby feature known as The Stuic.

== Geography ==
Resting on the White Mounth plateau, Càrn a' Choire Bhoidheach is in close proximity to Eagles Rock to its South-East. To its East lies Creag A' Ghlas-Uillt, to its North is Loch Nan Eun, to its West is Carn An T-Sagairt Beag, and to the South-West and South lies the rivers of Allt An Da Chraobh Bheath and Allt An Dubh-Loch. Its summit top is flat, covered in grass, and generally featureless, save for a cairn, making navigation in mist difficult.

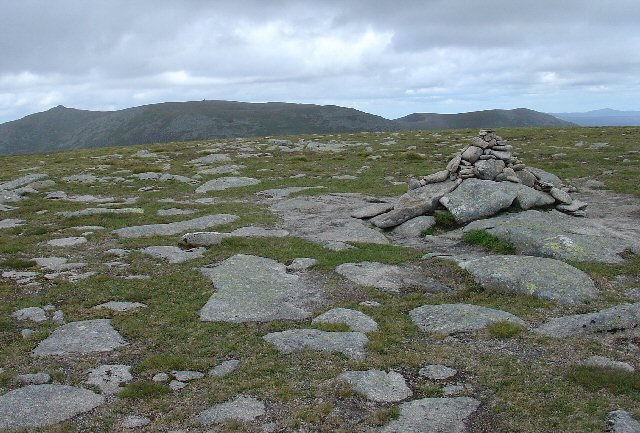
View of Càrn a' Choire Bhoidheach's summit cairn
