= Meall Ghaordaidh =

Coordinates: 56.52577°N 4.41735°W

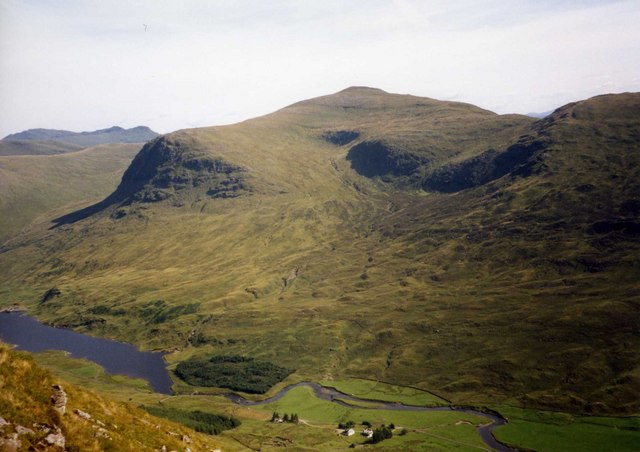
- Meall Ghaordaidh (centre) from An Grianan looking over Glen Lyon, with Stronuich Reservoir (bottom left)

Highest point
- Elevation: 1,039 m (3,409 ft)
- Prominence: 492 m (1,614 ft)
- Listing: Munro, Marilyn

Naming
- English translation: Possibly derived from gairdean (shoulder, hand or arm)
- Language of name: Gaelic

Geography
- Location: Stirlingshire, Scotland
- Parent range: Grampians
- OS grid: NN514397
- Topo map: OS Landranger 51

Meall Ghaordaidh is a mountain in the Southern Highlands of Scotland, approximately 10 km north-west of Killin. It is a Munro, recorded as Meall Ghaordie.

The mountain can be ascended via Glen Lochay starting to the north-west of the Allt Dhùin Croisg near Duncroisk, via an eroded path leading north-west through peat bogs to the summit; alternatively, an ascent can be made from Glen Lyon starting at Stronuich via one of two spurs that lead to the summit (Creag an Tulabhain or Creag Laoghain). The summit is marked by a large circular rock windbreak, within which there is a trig point.
