= Sgiath Chùil =

Mountain in the southern highlands of Scotland

- Sgiath Chùil and the Lubchurrin cottage from the north in Glen Lochay

Highest point
- Elevation: 921 m (3,022 ft)
- Prominence: 312 m (1,024 ft)
- Listing: Munro, Marilyn
- Coordinates: 56°27′9.94″N 4°29′46.64″W

Naming
- English translation: back wing
- Language of name: Gaelic

Geography
- Location: Stirling, Scotland
- Parent range: Glen Lochay Hills, Grampian Mountains
- OS grid: NN462317
- Topo map: OS Landranger 51

Climbing
- Easiest route: Hike

Listed summits of Sgiath Chùil
Name	Grid ref	Height	Status
Meall a' Churain	NN463325	918 metres (3,012 ft)	Munro Top

Sgiath Chùil is a mountain in the southern highlands of Scotland. It stands within Loch Lomond and the Trossachs National Park, on its northern border. It is about 11 kilometres (6.8 mi) west of Killin.

== Description ==
Sgiath Chùil qualifies as a Munro, at a height of 921 metres (3,022 ft), and with prominence of 312 metres (1,024 ft), as a Marilyn. In Sir Hugh Munro's original list of peaks in Scotland with a height over 3,000 feet (914 m) that was published in the Scottish Mountaineering Club Journal in September 1891, Sgiath Chùil was listed as a top, with Meall a' Churain listed as the mountain and higher point. This error was corrected when the first revision of the list was published in 1921.
