= Stob Coir' an Albannaich =

Mountain in the Grampian Mountains, Scotland

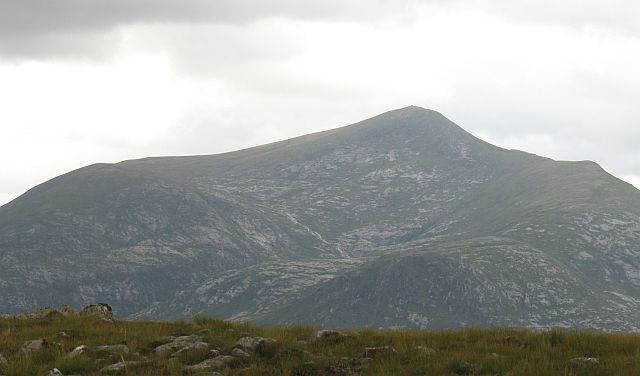
- Stob Coir' an Albannaich

Highest point
- Elevation: 1,044 m (3,425 ft)
- Prominence: 306 m (1,004 ft)
- Listing: Munro, Marilyn
- Coordinates: 56°33′18″N 4°58′47″W

Geography
- Location: Argyll and Bute / Highland, Scotland
- Parent range: Grampian Mountains
- OS grid: NN169442
- Topo map: OS Landranger 50

Stob Coir' an Albannaich (1,044 m) is a mountain in the Grampian Mountains of Scotland. It lies on the border of Argyll and Bute and the Highlands area, south of Glen Etive.

The mountain makes for a fine traverse. The closest village is Taynuilt to the south.
