= Beinn nan Aighenan =

Scottish mountain in Grampian mountain range

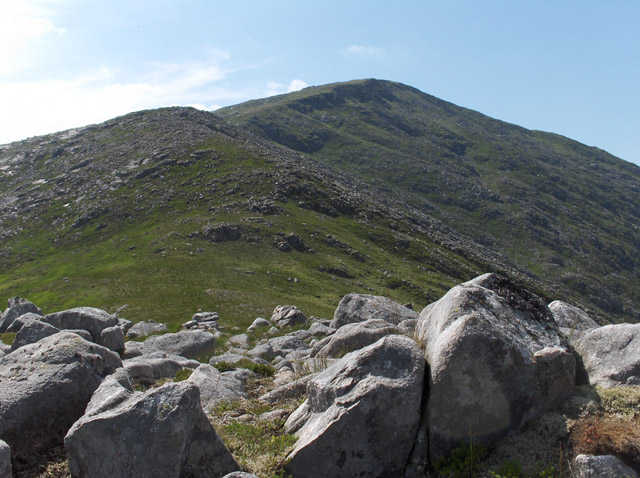

Highest point
- Elevation: 960 m (3,150 ft)
- Prominence: 343 m (1,125 ft)
- Listing: Munro, Marilyn
- Coordinates: 56°31′12″N 5°00′43″W

Geography
- Location: Argyll and Bute, Scotland
- Parent range: Grampian Mountains
- OS grid: NN148405
- Topo map: OS Landranger 50

Beinn nan Aighenan is a 960-metre-high (3,150 ft) mountain in the Grampian Mountains of Scotland. It lies in Argyll and Bute, north of the village of Taynuilt.

An isolated mountain, the most popular routes to its summit are from either Glen Kinglass or a climb above the ridge from Glen Etive.
