= Beinn Heasgarnich =

Scottish mountain

Coordinates: 56.51020°N 4.57914°W

- Beinn Sheasgarnaich
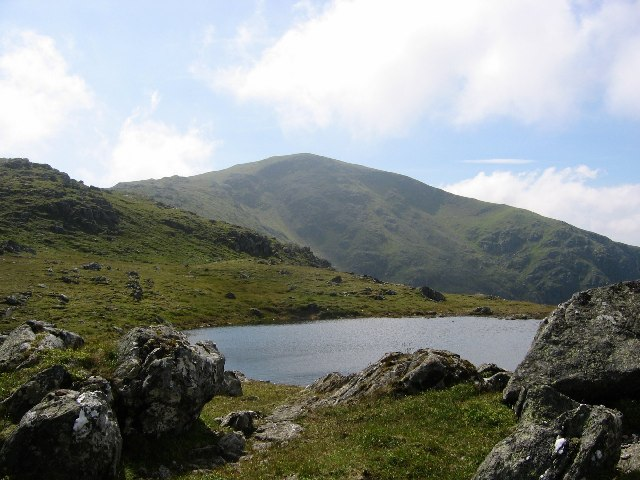
- Beinn Heasgarnich from the east, 2004

Highest point
- Elevation: 1,078 m (3,537 ft)
- Prominence: 579 m (1,900 ft)
- Parent peak: Ben Lawers
- Listing: Munro, Marilyn

Naming
- English translation: mountain of the sheltered place
- Pronunciation: Scottish Gaelic: [peɲ ˈhes̪əɾʲkʲɪɲəx]

Geography
- Location: Perth and Kinross, Scotland
- Parent range: Grampian Mountains
- OS grid: NN4138538330
- Topo map: OS Landranger 51

Climbing
- Easiest route: Hike

Beinn Heasgarnich (Scottish Gaelic: Beinn Sheasgarnaich) is a mountain in the Breadalbane region of the Scottish Highlands. It lies about 2 km south of Loch Lyon. It is a Munro with a height of 1,078 metres (3,537 ft).
