= List of mountains of the British Isles by height (1–500) =

Highest mountains in Great Britain ("Simms" classification)
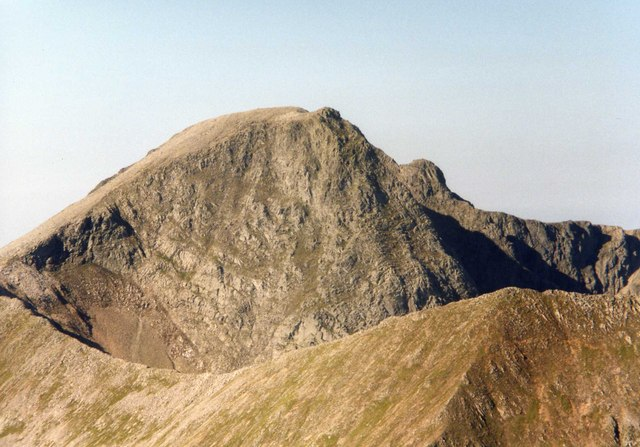
- Ben Nevis, in the Scottish Highlands, is the highest mountain in The British Isles

Highest point
- Elevation: over 600 m (1,969 ft)
- Prominence: over 30 m (98 ft)

Geography
- Location: 2,756 British Isles: 2,192 Scotland; 223 Ireland (Note: As of October 2018, the Irish MountainViews Online Database, list the prominence of Knockbrinnea (W) as 29m, and Carrignabinnia as 27 m, and thus they do not qualify as Irish Arderins, which means that MountainViews does not classify these two peaks as Simms; the total number of Irish Arderins over 600 m is thus 222. The DoBIH however uses the Harvey Tables which list the prominence for both at 30 m, and thus the DoBIH class them as Irish Simms, giving 224 Irish Simms in total.); 192 England; 150 Wales; 1 Isle of Man

This article provides access to lists of mountains in Britain and Ireland by height and by prominence. (See Lists of mountains below.) Height and prominence are the most important metrics for the classifications of mountains by the UIAA; with isolation a distant third criterion. (Note: No definition of a British Isles mountain or hill uses an explicit quantitative metric of topographic isolation (e.g. distance to the next point of equal height), however, the concept of isolation is embedded in the qualitative definition of a Scottish Munro, from the Scottish Mountaineering Club requirement of "sufficient separation" (instead of prominence).) The list is sourced from the Database of British and Irish Hills ("DoBIH") (Note: The Database of British and Irish Hills ("DoBIH") is the most referenced database for the classification of peaks in the British Isles, and the DoBIH is licensed under a "Creative Commons Attribution 3.0 Unported License".) for peaks that meet the consensus height threshold for a mountain, namely 600 metres (1,969 ft); the list also rules out peaks with a prominence below 30 metres (98 ft) and thus, the list is therefore precisely a list of the 2,756 (Note: Some sites list 2753 Simms, however, the Database of British and Irish Hills ("DoBIH") has added an extra Irish Simm, Knockbrinnea (W), bringing the total as at October 2022 to 2756.) Simms in the British Isles (as at October 2022). Many classifications of mountains in the British Isles consider a prominence between 30–150 metres (98–492 ft) as being a "top", and not a mountain; however, using the 30 metres (98 ft) prominence threshold gives the broadest possible list of mountains. For a ranking of mountains with a higher prominence threshold use:

- List of Marilyns in the British Isles, for ranking by height and by prominence, of peaks with prominence over 150 metres (492 ft); or
- List of P600 mountains in the British Isles, for ranking by height and by prominence, of peaks with prominence over 600 metres (1,969 ft)

== Coverage of Simms ==
Despite using the lower threshold for prominence of 30 metres (98 ft), the UIAA threshold for an "independent" peak, one Scottish Munro is missing, namely Maoile Lunndaidh whose official prominence changed to 11 metres (36 ft) in 2014; (Note: 281 of the 282 Scottish Munros have an official OSI prominence above 30 m, except Maoile Lunndaidh, who was found in a 2014 survey to be lower than nearby Creag Toll a' Choin. Thus, Maoile Lunndaidh had its official prominence downgraded from 400 m to just under 11 m, and the 400 m of prominence given to Creag Toll a' Choin. Note that Creag Toll a' Choin had previously been a Munro until older surveys downgraded its status in favour of Maoile Lunndaidh.) (Note: There is no known "composite" list of British Isles mountains that merges the Munro definition with other defined lists; the closest defined lists that include almost all Munros, are those that reduce the minimum prominence threshold to 30 metres (98 ft).) As of October 2018, the list of 2,754 British Isles Simms contained:

1. 281 of the 282 Munros, and 158 of the 226 Munro Tops;
2. All 222 Corbetts, all 219 Grahams, and all 118 Scottish New Donalds;
3. 872 of the 2,011 British Isles Marilyns;
4. All 524 of the England, Wales, and Ireland Hewitts;
5. 117 of the 541 Lake District Birketts (of which 99 are Wainwrights), that meet the Simms criteria;
6. All 224 of the 407 Irish Arderins with a height above 600.0 m;
7. All of the 120 P600 ("major") mountains in the British Isles;
8. 33 of the 34 England, Wales and Ireland Furths. (Note: 33 of the 34 SMC Furths have a prominence above 30 metres (98 feet), however, Caher West Top in Ireland, has a prominence of 24 metres (79 feet).)

== Simms by height by prominence ==
This list was downloaded from the DoBIH in October 2018, and includes all British and Irish peaks with a prominence below 30 metres (98 ft). Note that topographical prominence is complex to measure and requires a survey of the entire contours of a peak, rather than a single point of height. These tables are therefore subject to being revised over time, and should not be amended or updated unless the entire DoBIH data is re-downloaded again. The default table ranking is by height, so where the table is sorted by for example Region, the table will list the mountains within each Region by order of height.

Regional Top: The highest mountain in England, Wales, Scotland, Ireland, or the Isle of Man

== Lists of mountains ==
- List of mountains of the British Isles by height (1–500)
- List of mountains of the British Isles by height (501–1000)
- List of mountains of the British Isles by height (1001–1500)
- List of mountains of the British Isles by height (1501–2000)
- List of mountains of the British Isles by height (2001–2500)
- List of mountains of the British Isles by height (2501–3000)

Britain and Ireland mountains ranked by height and by prominence, Simms classification (DoBIH, October 2018)
Height Total	Prom. Total	Region	Height Region	Prom. Region	Name	Height (m)	Prom. (m)	Height (ft)	Prom. (ft)	Map Sec.	Topo Map	OS Grid Reference	Classification (§ DoBIH codes)
1	1	Scotland	1	1	Ben Nevis; Highest in Scotland, British Isles	1,345	1,345	4,411	4,411	04A	41	[56.796087881253;-5.0047119553754 NN166712]	Ma,M,Sim,CoH,CoU,CoA,SIB
2	9	Scotland	2	7	Ben Macdui	1,309	950	4,295	3,117	08A	36 43	[57.069971247304;-3.6707142353809 NN988989]	Ma,M,Sim,CoH,CoU,CoA
3	226	Scotland	3	162	Braeriach	1,296	461	4,252	1,512	08A	36 43	[57.078167471164;-3.7288277398983 NN953999]	Ma,M,Sim
4	800	Scotland	4	602	Cairn Toul	1,291	166	4,236	545	08A	36 43	[57.054150309647;-3.7112230965388 NN963972]	Ma,M,Sim
5	2018	Scotland	5	1578	Carn na Criche	1,265	50	4,150	164	08A	36 43	[57.062582644544;-3.7511914272483 NN939982]	MT,Sim
6	1085	Scotland	6	830	Sgor an Lochain Uaine	1,258	118	4,127	387	08A	36 43	[57.057538419698;-3.7262195423628 NN954976]	Hu,M,Sim
7	900	Scotland	7	677	Cairn Gorm	1,245	146	4,084	478	08A	36	[57.116136755879;-3.6447165960439 NJ005040]	Hu,M,Sim,sMa
8	281	Scotland	8	209	Aonach Beag	1,234	404	4,049	1,325	04A	41	[56.79999062777;-4.9542398050831 NN197715]	Ma,M,Sim
9	976	Scotland	9	738	Aonach Mor	1,221	134	4,006	440	04A	41	[56.812395568868;-4.9617715811893 NN193729]	Hu,M,Sim
10	2433	Scotland	10	1918	Carn Dearg (NW)	1,221	36	4,006	118	04A	41	[56.802091259477;-5.0166608631247 NN159719]	MT,Sim
11	812	Scotland	11	612	Carn Mor Dearg	1,220	162	4,003	531	04A	41	[56.804594208735;-4.9873703871015 NN177721]	Ma,M,Sim
12	1336	Scotland	12	1027	Cairn Lochan	1,216	91	3,990	299	08A	36	[57.10223048635;-3.6771186386166 NH985025]	MT,Sim,sHu
13	11	Scotland	13	8	Ben Lawers	1,214	915	3,983	3,002	02B	51	[56.544702244161;-4.2217106808695 NN635414]	Ma,M,Sim,CoH,CoU,CoA
14	2124	Scotland	14	1664	Stob Coire an t-Saighdeir	1,213	46	3,980	151	08A	36 43	[57.046046564575;-3.7124987390776 NN962963]	MT,Sim
15	232	Scotland	15	167	Beinn a' Bhuird	1,197	456	3,927	1,496	08B	36	[57.087406618475;-3.4998747054211 NJ092006]	Ma,M,Sim
16	2019	Scotland	16	1579	Sron na Lairige	1,184	50	3,885	164	08A	36	[57.084701807159;-3.7109801663546 NH964006]	MT,Sim
17	524	Scotland	17	386	Beinn Mheadhoin	1,183	254	3,881	833	08A	36	[57.094993474582;-3.6124189375672 NJ024016]	Ma,M,Sim
18	2	Scotland	18	2	Carn Eige	1,183	1,147	3,881	3,763	11A	25	[57.286829205846;-5.1160038681001 NH123261]	Ma,M,Sim,CoH
19	988	Scotland	19	749	Mam Sodhail	1,179	132	3,869	434	11A	25	[57.279530259266;-5.1203652956388 NH120253]	Hu,M,Sim
20	2020	Scotland	20	1580	Beinn a' Bhuird South Top	1,179	50	3,868	164	08B	36 43	[57.069426820559;-3.5007984896987 NO091986]	MT,Sim
21	241	Scotland	21	176	Stob Choire Claurigh	1,177	446	3,862	1,463	04A	41	[56.823062949341;-4.8511499440716 NN261738]	Ma,M,Sim
22	1723	Scotland	22	1341	Stob Coire an t-Sneachda	1,176	65	3,858	213	08A	36	[57.106063757332;-3.6591299130066 NH996029]	MT,Sim
23	6	Scotland	23	4	Ben More	1,174	986	3,852	3,235	01C	51	[56.385788443774;-4.5413166310237 NN432244]	Ma,M,Sim,CoU,CoA
24	2568	Scotland	24	2031	Cnap a' Chleirich	1,174	33	3,852	108	08B	36	[57.091292364623;-3.4752760916407 NJ107010]	MT,Sim
25	679	Scotland	25	512	Ben Avon	1,171	197	3,842	646	08B	36	[57.098936402859;-3.4359630296548 NJ131018]	Ma,M,Sim
26	428	Scotland	26	317	Stob Binnein	1,165	303	3,822	994	01C	51	[56.370596736351;-4.5370658457161 NN434227]	Ma,M,Sim
27	510	Scotland	27	373	Beinn Bhrotain	1,157	258	3,796	846	08A	43	[57.00905129005;-3.723972124016 NN954922]	Ma,M,Sim
28	73	Scotland	28	54	Lochnagar	1,156	671	3,793	2,201	07A	44	[56.959915160112;-3.2464248666692 NO243861]	Ma,M,Sim
29	931	Scotland	29	703	Derry Cairngorm	1,155	141	3,789	463	08A	36 43	[57.0625181671;-3.6225541309679 NO017980]	Hu,M,Sim,sMa
30	24	Scotland	30	19	Sgurr na Lapaich	1,151	840	3,776	2,756	12B	25	[57.369104432447;-5.0597656365407 NH161351]	Ma,M,Sim
31	253	Scotland	31	187	Sgurr nan Ceathreamhnan	1,151	434	3,776	1,424	11A	25 33	[57.254473558873;-5.2227294056911 NH057228]	Ma,M,Sim
32	22	Scotland	32	17	Bidean nam Bian	1,149	844	3,771	2,769	03B	41	[56.642668766065;-5.0300141582737 NN143542]	Ma,M,Sim,CoH
33	40	Scotland	33	33	Ben Alder	1,148	783	3,766	2,569	04B	42	[56.813310708809;-4.4653344214032 NN496718]	Ma,M,Sim
34	2021	Scotland	34	1581	Stob a' Choire Dhomhain	1,147	50	3,761	164	11A	25	[57.289848096379;-5.1029789878114 NH131264]	MT,Sim
35	2344	Scotland	35	1842	Sgurr nan Ceathreamhnan West Top	1,143	38	3,750	125	11A	25 33	[57.254260896605;-5.2310033748486 NH052228]	MT,Sim
36	2563	Scotland	36	2026	Stob Coire Dhomhnuill	1,139	33	3,737	109	11A	25	[57.288299266084;-5.0928887565618 NH137262]	MT,Sim
37	276	Scotland	37	206	Geal-Chàrn	1,132	410	3,714	1,345	04B	42	[56.837559194701;-4.5111976809099 NN469746]	Ma,M,Sim
38	15	Scotland	38	11	Ben Lui	1,130	875	3,707	2,871	01D	50	[56.396142266504;-4.8110327508285 NN266262]	Ma,M,Sim
39	46	Scotland	39	37	Binnein Mor	1,130	759	3,707	2,490	04A	41	[56.753916006415;-4.9260759208094 NN212663]	Ma,M,Sim
40	431	Scotland	40	320	An Riabhachan	1,129	302	3,704	991	12B	25	[57.361686481195;-5.1057190994812 NH133344]	Ma,M,Sim
41	18	Scotland	41	14	Creag Meagaidh	1,128	867	3,701	2,844	09C	34 42	[56.951616922274;-4.602742809315 NN418875]	Ma,M,Sim
42	14	Scotland	42	10	Ben Cruachan	1,127	880	3,698	2,887	03C	50	[56.426179910247;-5.1327995398794 NN069304]	Ma,M,Sim,CoU,CoA
43	677	Scotland	43	510	Meall Garbh	1,123	198	3,685	650	02B	51	[56.565610472086;-4.2082877411885 NN644437]	Ma,M,Sim
44	1827	Scotland	44	1422	Stob Coire na Ceannain	1,123	59	3,684	194	04A	41	[56.829567683264;-4.8418080205863 NN267745]	MT,Sim
45	79	Scotland	45	59	Beinn a' Ghlo	1,122	658	3,681	2,159	06B	43	[56.839722744145;-3.6883100848819 NN971733]	Ma,M,Sim
46	38	Scotland	46	31	A' Chràlaig	1,120	786	3,675	2,579	11B	33	[57.183379426298;-5.1552849358805 NH094147]	Ma,M,Sim
47	555	Scotland	47	413	Sgor Gaoith	1,118	242	3,668	794	08A	36 43	[57.068024101044;-3.8108274513609 NN903989]	Ma,M,Sim
48	1032	Scotland	48	785	An Stuc	1,117	126	3,665	413	02B	51	[56.560050465385;-4.2177282481519 NN638431]	Hu,M,Sim
49	1568	Scotland	49	1218	Stob Coire an Laoigh	1,116	74	3,661	243	04A	41	[56.810571161123;-4.886250019653 NN239725]	M,Sim
50	1259	Scotland	50	963	Aonach Beag (Ben Alder)	1,116	99	3,661	325	04B	42	[56.832674861994;-4.5305431991791 NN457741]	M,Sim,sHu
51	1100	Scotland	51	840	Stob Coire nan Lochan	1,116	117	3,660	382	03B	41	[56.648249578071;-5.0223038788684 NN148548]	Hu,MT,Sim
52	110	Scotland	52	79	Stob Coire Easain	1,115	611	3,658	2,005	04A	41	[56.817618934455;-4.773708487282 NN308730]	Ma,M,Sim
53	945	Scotland	53	714	Monadh Mor	1,113	138	3,652	453	08A	36 43	[57.026643775809;-3.7511480936377 NN938942]	Hu,M,Sim
54	877	Scotland	54	661	Tom a' Choinich	1,112	149	3,648	489	11A	25	[57.299259561754;-5.0489776690746 NH164273]	Hu,M,Sim,sMa
55	1846	Scotland	55	1439	Sgoran Dubh Mor	1,111	58	3,645	190	08A	36	[57.079720139665;-3.8097475384143 NH904002]	MT,Sim
56	1555	Scotland	56	1207	Carn a' Choire Bhoidheach	1,110	75	3,641	246	07A	44	[56.945263796017;-3.2738812602183 NO226845]	M,Sim
57	313	Scotland	57	232	Sgurr nan Conbhairean	1,109	382	3,638	1,253	11B	34	[57.176747785806;-5.0967954868873 NH129138]	Ma,M,Sim
58	12	Scotland	58	9	Sgurr Mor	1,108	913	3,635	2,995	14B	20	[57.699984010906;-5.0171331903782 NH203718]	Ma,M,Sim
59	1907	Scotland	59	1485	Creagan a' Choire Etchachan	1,108	55	3,635	180	08A	36 43	[57.076756823068;-3.6330744576125 NO011996]	MT,Sim
60	36	Scotland	60	29	Meall a' Bhuiridh	1,108	795	3,635	2,608	03C	41	[56.611798257826;-4.853127062965 NN250503]	Ma,M,Sim
61	1998	Scotland	61	1560	Caisteal	1,106	51	3,629	167	04A	41	[56.814424521941;-4.875074992522 NN246729]	MT,Sim
62	936	Scotland	62	708	Stob a' Choire Mheadhoin	1,105	140	3,625	459	04A	41	[56.823293173904;-4.7610152703082 NN316736]	Hu,M,Sim,sMa
63	1027	Scotland	63	780	Beinn Eibhinn	1,103	127	3,619	417	04B	42	[56.825228843081;-4.5431533376801 NN449733]	Hu,M,Sim
64	1269	Scotland	64	972	Stob Dearg	1,103	98	3,619	321	03C	50	[56.428584169978;-5.1443533633746 NN062307]	MT,Sim,sHu
65	1181	Scotland	65	902	Beinn Ghlas	1,103	107	3,619	351	02B	51	[56.535433543819;-4.2374314552542 NN625404]	Hu,M,Sim
66	857	Scotland	66	646	Mullach Fraoch-choire	1,102	153	3,615	502	11B	33	[57.204905758126;-5.1571229128633 NH094171]	Ma,M,Sim
67	787	Scotland	67	591	Creise	1,100	169	3,608	556	03C	41	[56.614040377193;-4.8728571611841 NN238506]	Ma,M,Sim
68	394	Scotland	68	292	Sgurr a' Mhaim	1,099	316	3,606	1,037	04A	41	[56.755638754451;-5.004750956 NN164667]	Ma,M,Sim
69	1684	Scotland	69	1308	Clach Leathad	1,099	68	3,605	222	03C	50	[56.60245126156;-4.8687175766012 NN240493]	MT,Sim
70	819	Scotland	70	616	Sgurr Choinnich Mor	1,094	159	3,589	522	04A	41	[56.800246167411;-4.9051140909144 NN227714]	Ma,M,Sim
71	588	Scotland	71	439	Sgurr nan Clach Geala	1,093	229	3,586	751	14B	20	[57.695632864319;-5.0486632377905 NH184714]	Ma,M,Sim
72	1774	Scotland	72	1384	Sgurr nan Clachan Geala	1,093	62	3,586	203	12B	25	[57.361031538004;-5.0590931151376 NH161342]	MT,Sim
73	460	Scotland	73	338	Bynack More	1,090	283	3,576	928	08A	36	[57.137555346213;-3.5861778523753 NJ041063]	Ma,M,Sim
74	295	Scotland	74	218	Stob Ghabhar	1,090	393	3,576	1,289	03C	50	[56.567979525481;-4.8823865516927 NN230455]	Ma,M,Sim
75	161	Scotland	75	111	Beinn a' Chlachair	1,087	539	3,566	1,768	04B	42	[56.869036909837;-4.5100265187847 NN471781]	Ma,M,Sim
76	3	Wales	1	1	Snowdon; Highest in Wales	1,085	1,039	3,560	3,409	30B	115	[53.067776321303;-4.0774737432005 SH609543]	Ma,F,Sim,Hew,N,CoH,CoU,CoA
77	34	Scotland	76	27	Beinn Dearg	1,084	805	3,556	2,641	15A	20	[57.78561234199;-4.9300498833955 NH259811]	Ma,M,Sim
78	53	Scotland	77	42	Schiehallion	1,083	716	3,553	2,349	02A	42 51 52	[56.666308621239;-4.1015699534686 NN713547]	Ma,M,Sim
79	32	Scotland	78	25	Sgurr a' Choire Ghlais	1,083	818	3,553	2,684	12A	25	[57.443790469929;-4.9043119193698 NH258430]	Ma,M,Sim
80	542	Scotland	79	402	Beinn a' Chaorainn	1,083	246	3,553	807	08B	36	[57.092740519882;-3.5776612814401 NJ045013]	Ma,M,Sim
81	2345	Scotland	80	1843	Cuidhe Crom	1,083	38	3,553	125	07A	44	[56.949397049293;-3.2197693956726 NO259849]	MT,Sim
82	85	Scotland	81	64	Beinn a' Chreachain	1,081	650	3,545	2,133	02A	50	[56.559692936604;-4.6489978976074 NN373440]	Ma,M,Sim
83	2147	Scotland	82	1681	Stob Coire Easain	1,080	45	3,543	148	04A	41	[56.812176001791;-4.894566946915 NN234727]	MT,Sim
84	242	Scotland	83	177	Ben Starav	1,078	446	3,537	1,463	03C	50	[56.538784384233;-5.0509900311475 NN125427]	Ma,M,Sim
85	135	Scotland	84	91	Beinn Sheasgarnaich	1,077	579	3,535	1,900	02B	51	[56.509905847941;-4.5805037005213 NN413383]	Ma,M,Sim
86	365	Scotland	85	268	Beinn Dorain	1,076	332	3,530	1,089	02A	50	[56.502368059988;-4.7230053491396 NN325378]	Ma,M,Sim
87	2072	Scotland	86	1619	Stuc Bheag	1,075	48	3,527	157	11A	25 33	[57.262375185993;-5.2300555996955 NH053237]	MT,Sim
88	1700	Scotland	87	1321	An Tudair	1,074	66	3,524	217	11A	25	[57.267260274114;-5.107713438871 NH127239]	MT,Sim
89	1018	Scotland	88	772	Stob Coire Sgreamhach	1,072	128	3,517	420	03B	41	[56.637721032032;-5.011674108567 NN154536]	Hu,M,Sim
90	2148	Scotland	89	1682	Puist Coire Ardair	1,071	45	3,514	148	09C	34 42	[56.949570515682;-4.5713535577469 NN437872]	MT,Sim
91	605	Scotland	90	454	Beinn a' Ghlo - Braigh Coire Chruinn-bhalgain	1,070	222	3,510	730	06B	43	[56.831057883219;-3.7305333488478 NN945724]	Ma,M,Sim
92	662	Scotland	91	497	Meall Corranaich	1,069	202	3,507	663	02B	51	[56.540526012681;-4.253997948322 NN615410]	Ma,M,Sim
93	645	Scotland	92	486	An Socach	1,069	207	3,507	679	12B	25	[57.349559193597;-5.1595647702403 NH100332]	Ma,M,Sim
94	76	Scotland	93	56	Sgurr Fhuaran	1,069	665	3,506	2,182	11A	33	[57.195451199089;-5.3483981830552 NG978166]	Ma,M,Sim
95	1590	Scotland	94	1234	Stob an Chul Choire	1,068	72	3,504	236	04A	41	[56.814577318052;-4.9455554964348 NN203731]	MT,Sim
96	690	Scotland	95	520	Glas Maol	1,068	194	3,504	636	07A	43	[56.872374157665;-3.3698407137295 NO166765]	Ma,M,Sim,CoH,CoU
97	1591	Wales	2	93	Crib y Ddysgl	1,065	72	3,495	236	30B	115	[53.074988881538;-4.0763281722018 SH610551]	F,Sim,Hew,N
98	49	Wales	3	2	Carnedd Llewelyn	1,064	750	3,491	2,461	30B	115	[53.159489698298;-3.9712109048985 SH683643]	Ma,F,Sim,Hew,N,CoU
99	1082	Scotland	96	828	Cairn of Claise	1,064	119	3,491	390	07A	43	[56.893368204318;-3.3394188772264 NO185788]	Hu,M,Sim
100	47	Scotland	97	38	An Teallach - Bidein a' Ghlas Thuill	1,063	757	3,486	2,484	14A	19	[57.806483088931;-5.253335243272 NH068843]	Ma,M,Sim
101	1955	Scotland	98	1522	Airgiod Bheinn	1,062	53	3,483	174	06B	43	[56.826928785551;-3.7041221330721 NN961719]	MT,Sim
102	930	Scotland	99	702	An Teallach - Sgurr Fiona	1,059	142	3,473	465	14A	19	[57.800033080171;-5.2594882415685 NH064836]	Hu,M,Sim,sMa
103	8	Scotland	100	6	Liathach - Spidean a' Choire Leith	1,055	957	3,461	3,140	13A	25	[57.563577052624;-5.4641195358649 NG929579]	Ma,M,Sim
104	1284	Scotland	101	984	Na Gruagaichean	1,054	97	3,459	318	04A	41	[56.743701007583;-4.9400027998885 NN203652]	M,Sim,sHu
105	734	Scotland	102	553	Toll Creagach	1,054	182	3,458	597	11A	25	[57.308529469207;-4.9999208335916 NH194282]	Ma,M,Sim
106	1154	Scotland	103	881	Stob Poite Coire Ardair	1,054	109	3,458	358	09C	34 42	[56.963624178746;-4.5871286900844 NN428888]	Hu,M,Sim
107	138	Scotland	104	94	Sgùrr a' Chaorachain	1,053	568	3,455	1,864	12A	25	[57.452156041018;-5.1900933381344 NH087447]	Ma,M,Sim
108	1890	Scotland	105	1470	Creag an Leth-choin	1,053	56	3,455	184	08A	36	[57.109035284943;-3.7054969829535 NH968033]	MT,Sim
109	585	Scotland	106	436	Beinn a' Chaorainn	1,052	230	3,451	755	09C	34 41	[56.92807741206;-4.6536986546745 NN386850]	Ma,M,Sim
110	2283	Scotland	107	1794	Carn Ban Mor	1,052	40	3,451	131	08A	35 36 43	[57.052521170428;-3.8265601352082 NN893972]	MT,Sim
111	310	Scotland	108	230	Glas Tulaichean	1,051	384	3,448	1,260	06B	43	[56.865673116174;-3.5582427944379 NO051760]	Ma,M,Sim
112	1865	Scotland	109	1452	An Leth-chreag	1,051	57	3,448	187	11A	25	[57.295268397368;-5.0652496610044 NH154269]	MT,Sim
113	411	Scotland	110	304	Geal Charn	1,049	310	3,442	1,017	04B	42	[56.897037930251;-4.4577130311428 NN504811]	Ma,M,Sim
114	891	Scotland	111	669	Sgurr Fhuar-thuill	1,049	147	3,442	482	12A	25	[57.449181774873;-4.9430838231249 NH235437]	Hu,M,Sim,sMa
115	2175	Scotland	112	1703	Corrag Bhuidhe	1,049	44	3,442	144	14A	19	[57.798239573418;-5.2593263507015 NH064834]	MT,Sim
116	296	Scotland	113	219	Creag Mhor	1,047	393	3,435	1,289	02B	50	[56.489414429406;-4.6148522021113 NN391361]	Ma,M,Sim
117	1418	Scotland	114	1090	Carn an t-Sagairt Mor	1,047	85	3,435	279	07A	44	[56.942264640649;-3.3033659852931 NO208842]	M,Sim
118	1419	Scotland	115	1091	Bidean an Eoin Deirg	1,047	85	3,433	279	12A	25	[57.449239924534;-5.1631622651503 NH103443]	MT,Sim
119	64	Scotland	116	50	Ben Wyvis - Glas Leathad Mor	1,046	691	3,432	2,267	15B	20	[57.678185936423;-4.5808282143035 NH462683]	Ma,M,Sim
120	89	Scotland	117	67	Chno Dearg	1,046	644	3,432	2,113	04B	41	[56.82994978988;-4.6615039177876 NN377741]	Ma,M,Sim
121	155	Scotland	118	107	Cruach Ardrain	1,046	549	3,431	1,801	01C	51 56	[56.356299650083;-4.5765878564474 NN409212]	Ma,M,Sim
122	538	Scotland	119	398	Beinn Iutharn Mhor	1,045	247	3,428	810	06B	43	[56.89428604903;-3.5692843146269 NO045792]	Ma,M,Sim
123	2248	Scotland	120	1765	Carn an t-Sagairt Beag	1,044	41	3,427	135	07A	44	[56.947789596886;-3.2904070653061 NO216848]	MT,Sim
124	1138	Wales	4	66	Carnedd Dafydd	1,044	111	3,425	364	30B	115	[53.147287377022;-4.0020548733699 SH662630]	Hu,F,Sim,Hew,N
125	417	Scotland	121	309	Stob Coir' an Albannaich	1,044	306	3,425	1,004	03C	50	[56.554874003299;-4.980670770144 NN169443]	Ma,M,Sim
126	195	Scotland	122	138	Meall nan Tarmachan	1,044	494	3,424	1,622	02B	51	[56.520781064449;-4.301598054337 NN585389]	Ma,M,Sim
127	2316	Scotland	123	1817	Beinn a' Chaorainn North Top	1,043	39	3,422	128	09C	34 41	[56.934254292442;-4.659069300527 NN383857]	MT,Sim
128	221	Scotland	124	159	Carn Mairg	1,042	466	3,419	1,529	02A	42 51	[56.634080397384;-4.1470638527984 NN684512]	Ma,M,Sim
129	2022	Scotland	125	1582	Stuc Mor	1,041	50	3,415	164	11A	25 33	[57.266859464279;-5.2304485440522 NH053242]	MT,Sim
130	25	Scotland	126	20	Sgurr na Ciche	1,040	839	3,412	2,753	10B	33 40	[57.012703952247;-5.457176070828 NM902966]	Ma,M,Sim
131	198	Scotland	127	140	Meall Ghaordaidh	1,040	492	3,411	1,614	02B	51	[56.525771465808;-4.4173481962755 NN514397]	Ma,M,Sim
132	2172	Scotland	128	1701	Na Gruagaichean NW Top	1,039	44	3,408	145	04A	41	[56.745418241679;-4.943408654587 NN201654]	MT,Sim
133	4	Ireland	1	1	Carrauntoohil; Highest in Ireland	1,039	1,039	3,407	3,407	50C	78	[51.999248188609;-9.743616364549 V803844]	Ma,F,Sim,Hew,Dil,A,VL,CoH,CoU
134	596	Scotland	129	447	Beinn Achaladair	1,039	226	3,407	741	02A	50	[56.551499989234;-4.6956161938996 NN344432]	Ma,M,Sim
135	2389	Scotland	130	1881	An Riabhachan West Top	1,038	37	3,406	121	12B	25	[57.354749413732;-5.1317402499967 NH117337]	MT,Sim
136	582	Scotland	131	433	Carn a' Mhaim	1,037	231	3,402	758	08A	36 43	[57.035981165279;-3.6593001608537 NN994951]	Ma,M,Sim
137	408	Scotland	132	301	Sgurr a' Bhealaich Dheirg	1,036	311	3,399	1,020	11A	33	[57.177302368456;-5.2524139091461 NH035143]	Ma,M,Sim
138	1155	Scotland	133	882	Sgurr na Lapaich	1,036	109	3,399	358	11A	25	[57.271946504175;-5.0633098145776 NH154243]	Hu,MT,Sim
139	45	Scotland	134	36	Gleouraich	1,035	765	3,396	2,510	10A	33	[57.096755823818;-5.2387439116782 NH039053]	Ma,M,Sim
140	828	Scotland	135	624	Carn Dearg	1,034	158	3,392	518	04B	42	[56.854854773657;-4.4549450131199 NN504764]	Ma,M,Sim
141	88	Scotland	136	66	Beinn Fhada	1,032	647	3,386	2,123	11A	33	[57.22051519863;-5.2843885586318 NH018192]	Ma,M,Sim
142	858	Scotland	137	647	Am Bodach	1,032	153	3,385	501	04A	41	[56.740858505207;-4.9839424993605 NN176650]	Ma,M,Sim
143	1460	Scotland	138	1127	Creag Ghorm a' Bhealaich	1,030	81	3,379	266	12A	25	[57.447736630437;-4.9279639194325 NH244435]	MT,Sim
144	358	Scotland	139	262	Ben Oss	1,029	342	3,376	1,122	01D	50	[56.388832137088;-4.7764656265503 NN287253]	Ma,M,Sim
145	511	Scotland	140	374	Carn an Righ	1,029	258	3,376	846	06B	43	[56.875972748778;-3.5964119807069 NO028772]	Ma,M,Sim
146	717	Scotland	141	538	Carn Gorm	1,029	187	3,376	614	02A	42 51	[56.621904895453;-4.226246052553 NN635500]	Ma,M,Sim
147	1866	Scotland	142	1453	Sgor Iutharn	1,028	57	3,373	187	04B	42	[56.835521458651;-4.4782711928864 NN489743]	MT,Sim
148	2049	Scotland	143	1602	Meall Coire Choille-rais	1,028	49	3,373	161	09C	34 42	[56.94042712992;-4.5789445933969 NN432862]	MT,Sim
149	58	Scotland	144	45	Sgurr a' Mhaoraich	1,027	708	3,369	2,323	10A	33	[57.105096968284;-5.3319769512219 NG983065]	Ma,M,Sim
150	751	Scotland	145	563	Sgurr na Ciste Duibhe	1,027	178	3,369	584	11A	33	[57.180470340161;-5.3371099577098 NG984149]	Ma,M,Sim
151	1554	Scotland	146	1206	Meall Garbh	1,027	75	3,368	247	02B	51	[56.51518390976;-4.3126374197965 NN578383]	MT,Sim
152	240	Scotland	147	175	Ben Challum	1,025	450	3,363	1,476	02B	50	[56.454242430103;-4.6205492221165 NN386322]	Ma,M,Sim
153	1352	Scotland	148	1039	Drochaid Ghlas	1,024	91	3,361	297	03C	50	[56.42944184155;-5.1103557625259 NN083307]	MT,Sim,sHu
154	50	Scotland	149	40	Beinn a' Bheithir	1,024	729	3,360	2,392	03B	41	[56.653489081854;-5.172859640816 NN056558]	Ma,M,Sim
155	860	Scotland	150	649	Liathach - Mullach an Rathain	1,024	152	3,359	499	13A	25	[57.560059173112;-5.4938918293263 NG911576]	Ma,M,Sim
156	2284	Scotland	151	1795	West Meur Gorm Craig	1,023	40	3,356	131	08B	36	[57.115511732012;-3.4002730897011 NJ153036]	MT,Sim
157	163	Scotland	152	112	Buachaille Etive Mor - Stob Dearg	1,021	532	3,351	1,745	03B	41	[56.645736126151;-4.901371769021 NN222542]	Ma,M,Sim
158	37	Scotland	153	30	Ladhar Bheinn	1,020	795	3,346	2,608	10B	33	[57.074542314471;-5.5916850790938 NG824039]	Ma,M,Sim
159	2485	Scotland	154	1961	Carn Dearg (SW)	1,020	35	3,346	115	04A	41	[56.785785008471;-5.0219012542983 NN155701]	MT,Sim
160	197	Scotland	155	139	Aonach air Chrith	1,020	493	3,345	1,617	10A	33	[57.124172237781;-5.221307115556 NH051083]	Ma,M,Sim
161	724	Scotland	156	545	Beinn Bheoil	1,019	186	3,343	610	04B	42	[56.813087649594;-4.4309113526908 NN517717]	Ma,M,Sim
162	1203	Scotland	157	921	Mullach Clach a' Bhlair	1,019	104	3,343	341	08A	35 43	[57.011852170525;-3.8426819644588 NN882927]	Hu,M,Sim
163	1743	Scotland	158	1357	Carn an Tuirc	1,019	64	3,343	210	07A	43	[56.907542719608;-3.357990803309 NO174804]	M,Sim
164	1724	Scotland	159	1342	Beinn a' Chaorainn Bheag	1,017	65	3,337	213	08B	36	[57.096580072169;-3.5580168652713 NJ057017]	MT,Sim
165	1524	Scotland	160	1182	A' Choinneach	1,017	77	3,337	253	08A	36	[57.123897169933;-3.6004603942118 NJ032048]	MT,Sim
166	1282	Scotland	161	982	Sgurr Creag an Eich	1,016	97	3,335	318	14A	19	[57.801436684757;-5.2747674783507 NH055838]	MT,Sim,sHu
167	125	Scotland	162	86	Mullach Coire Mhic Fhearchair	1,015	591	3,331	1,939	14A	19	[57.708941567695;-5.2714419221176 NH052735]	Ma,M,Sim
168	792	Scotland	163	596	Garbh Chioch Mhor	1,013	168	3,323	551	10B	33 40	[57.00853804072;-5.4452552800155 NM909961]	Ma,M,Sim
169	1813	Scotland	164	1413	Meall Liath	1,012	60	3,320	197	02A	42 51	[56.634304622547;-4.1340318534524 NN692512]	MT,Sim
170	1525	Scotland	165	1183	Cairn Bannoch	1,012	77	3,320	253	07A	44	[56.927234515007;-3.2798388912811 NO222825]	M,Sim
171	361	Scotland	166	264	The Saddle	1,011	334	3,318	1,096	10A	33	[57.162195238703;-5.4148769281743 NG936131]	Ma,M,Sim
172	55	Scotland	167	44	Beinn Ime	1,011	712	3,317	2,336	01D	56	[56.23597575916;-4.8186485486305 NN254084]	Ma,M,Sim
173	912	Scotland	168	688	Stob na Doire	1,010	144	3,315	472	03B	41	[56.636191906782;-4.9251044124269 NN207532]	Hu,MT,Sim,sMa
174	148	Scotland	169	100	Beinn Udlamain	1,010	555	3,314	1,821	05A	42	[56.83477102204;-4.3306735505327 NN579739]	Ma,M,Sim
175	95	Scotland	170	69	Beinn Eighe - Ruadh-stac Mor	1,010	632	3,314	2,073	13A	19	[57.593271725823;-5.430115353198 NG951611]	Ma,M,Sim
176	483	Scotland	171	355	Sgurr Eilde Mor	1,010	271	3,314	889	04A	41	[56.749219707905;-4.8962632423854 NN230657]	Ma,M,Sim
177	709	Scotland	172	532	Sgurr an Doire Leathain	1,010	189	3,314	620	10A	33	[57.136084320881;-5.2818591080169 NH015098]	Ma,M,Sim
178	215	Scotland	173	153	Beinn Dearg	1,009	473	3,309	1,552	06A	43	[56.877337041493;-3.8852880040488 NN852778]	Ma,M,Sim
179	1351	Ireland	2	144	Beenkeragh	1,008	91	3,308	298	50C	78	[52.006391354901;-9.7468067392507 V801852]	F,Sim,Hew,Dil,A,VL,sHu
180	1891	Scotland	174	1471	Stob Coire na Craileig	1,008	56	3,307	184	11B	33	[57.197605488817;-5.1614670663075 NH091163]	MT,Sim
181	386	Scotland	175	286	An Sgarsoch	1,007	319	3,302	1,047	06A	43	[56.931350686894;-3.7548964014502 NN933836]	Ma,M,Sim
182	1402	Scotland	176	1079	Carn Liath	1,006	87	3,301	285	09C	34	[56.978561084923;-4.5157491580165 NN472903]	M,Sim
183	1828	Scotland	177	1423	Creag Coire na Fiar Bhealaich	1,006	59	3,301	194	10A	33	[57.095302277076;-5.2254058551797 NH047051]	MT,Sim
184	282	Scotland	178	210	Creag Toll a' Choin	1,005	403	3,298	1,322	12A	25	[57.459329334332;-5.1190053608024 NH130453]	Ma,Sim,xMT
185	773	Scotland	179	579	Beinn Fhionnlaidh	1,005	173	3,296	568	11A	25	[57.305335513783;-5.1308563002474 NH115282]	Ma,M,Sim
186	2434	Scotland	180	1919	Meall a' Bharr	1,004	36	3,294	118	02A	42 51	[56.63632104084;-4.1732821882649 NN668515]	MT,Sim
187	1052	Scotland	181	802	Sgurr an Lochain	1,004	123	3,294	404	10A	33	[57.141032116618;-5.2988322779667 NH005104]	Hu,M,Sim
188	539	Scotland	182	399	Beinn an Dothaidh	1,004	247	3,294	810	02A	50	[56.529502759319;-4.7151950985841 NN331408]	Ma,M,Sim
189	1374	Scotland	183	1057	The Devil's Point	1,004	89	3,294	292	08A	36 43	[57.035584755481;-3.688945745721 NN976951]	M,Sim
190	2118	Scotland	184	1658	Beinn Achaladair South Top	1,004	47	3,293	153	02A	50	[56.540660741075;-4.6980990743347 NN342420]	MT,Sim
191	359	Scotland	185	263	Sgurr Mor	1,003	341	3,291	1,119	10B	33 40	[57.028078927655;-5.3547477134495 NM965980]	Ma,M,Sim
192	977	Scotland	186	739	Sgurr na Carnach	1,002	134	3,287	440	11A	33	[57.188233016277;-5.3494000159933 NG977158]	Hu,M,Sim
193	1384	Scotland	187	1066	Sail Chaorainn	1,002	88	3,287	289	11B	34	[57.191262556953;-5.0913888155316 NH133154]	M,Sim
194	797	Scotland	188	599	Meall Greigh	1,001	167	3,284	548	02B	51	[56.567365417876;-4.1595582174506 NN674438]	Ma,M,Sim
195	548	Scotland	189	408	Beinn a' Bheithir - Sgorr Dhonuill	1,001	244	3,284	801	03B	41	[56.650130786456;-5.1986865043767 NN040555]	Ma,M,Sim
196	768	Scotland	190	575	Aonach Meadhoin	1,001	174	3,284	571	11A	33	[57.172476144755;-5.2304765448431 NH048137]	Ma,M,Sim
197	2435	Scotland	191	1920	Carn na Coire Mheadhoin (Centre Top)	1,001	36	3,284	118	11B	34	[57.194891215596;-5.0900365141202 NH134158]	MT,Sim
198	91	Wales	5	5	Glyder Fawr	1,001	642	3,284	2,106	30B	115	[53.100966047308;-4.0297781105064 SH642579]	Ma,F,Sim,Hew,N
199	1353	Scotland	192	1040	Beinn nan Eachan	1,000	91	3,281	297	02B	51	[56.514941318205;-4.3256269353101 NN570383]	MT,Sim,sHu
200	1254	Ireland	3	137	Caher	1,000	100	3,281	327	50C	78	[51.993620440077;-9.7594134690395 V792838]	F,Sim,Hew,Dil,A,VL,sHu
201	561	Scotland	193	417	Stob Ban	1,000	237	3,280	778	04A	41	[56.743303777122;-5.0315734725259 NN147654]	Ma,M,Sim
202	1536	Scotland	194	1192	Sgurr an Iubhair	1,000	77	3,280	252	04A	41	[56.74491264459;-5.0022581506817 NN165655]	MT,Sim
203	983	Scotland	195	744	Sgurr Choinnich	999	133	3,278	436	12A	25	[57.45079432506;-5.2083159837802 NH076446]	Hu,M,Sim
204	975	Scotland	196	737	Stob Daimh	999	135	3,278	441	03C	50	[56.43078447958;-5.0926196434524 NN094308]	Hu,M,Sim
205	237	Scotland	197	172	Sgurr Breac	999	451	3,278	1,480	14B	20	[57.691884729002;-5.0919861075711 NH158711]	Ma,M,Sim
206	2149	Scotland	198	1683	Ben Challum South Top	998	45	3,274	148	02B	50	[56.447960198784;-4.6201164954788 NN386315]	MT,Sim
207	26	Scotland	199	21	Ben More Assynt	998	835	3,274	2,740	16E	15	[58.137725573858;-4.8586845966083 NC318201]	Ma,M,Sim,CoH
208	2390	Scotland	200	1882	Creag a' Chaorainn	998	37	3,274	121	11B	34	[57.170794399846;-5.0830597930834 NH137131]	MT,Sim
209	2621	Scotland	201	2074	Meall Dubhag	998	32	3,274	105	08A	35 36 43	[57.03694350927;-3.8472204393542 NN880955]	MT,Sim
210	1744	Scotland	202	1358	Broad Cairn	998	64	3,274	210	07A	44	[56.918552541555;-3.2499735239197 NO240815]	M,Sim
211	735	Scotland	203	554	A' Chailleach	997	182	3,271	597	14B	19	[57.693669060442;-5.129065116355 NH136714]	Ma,M,Sim
212	583	Scotland	204	434	Glas Bheinn Mhor	997	231	3,271	758	03C	50	[56.541687444276;-5.0056662283712 NN153429]	Ma,M,Sim
213	513	Scotland	205	376	Spidean Mialach	996	257	3,268	843	10A	33	[57.088887372203;-5.1951285924802 NH065043]	Ma,M,Sim
214	2529	Scotland	206	1999	Mullach Cadha Rainich	996	34	3,268	112	11A	25	[57.274029182832;-5.0883724360747 NH139246]	MT,Sim
215	216	Scotland	207	154	An Caisteal	996	473	3,267	1,552	01C	50 56	[56.338195116232;-4.6255290752511 NN378193]	Ma,M,Sim
216	1566	Wales	6	89	Glyder Fach	994	75	3,262	244	30B	115	[53.104015756086;-4.0090073045263 SH656582]	F,Sim,Hew,N
217	459	Scotland	208	337	Carn an Fhidhleir	994	286	3,261	937	06A	43	[56.935162375359;-3.8027387745683 NN904841]	Ma,M,Sim
218	272	Scotland	209	203	Sgurr na h-Ulaidh	994	415	3,261	1,362	03B	41	[56.618961602127;-5.0802857712144 NN111517]	Ma,M,Sim
219	597	Scotland	210	448	Sgurr na Ruaidhe	993	226	3,258	741	12A	25	[57.441380668617;-4.8524513636835 NH289426]	Ma,M,Sim
220	680	Scotland	211	513	Carn nan Gobhar	993	197	3,258	646	12B	25	[57.362731600148;-5.0259689702607 NH181343]	Ma,M,Sim
221	779	Scotland	212	585	Beinn Eighe - Spidean Coire nan Clach	993	172	3,258	564	13A	25	[57.581396781524;-5.4038936539956 NG966597]	Ma,M,Sim
222	2486	Scotland	213	1962	An Cearcallach	993	35	3,258	115	09C	34 42	[56.932010559592;-4.5948012454236 NN422853]	MT,Sim
223	5	Scotland	214	3	Sgurr Alasdair	992	992	3,255	3,255	17B	32	[57.205871667453;-6.2241087291448 NG450207]	Ma,M,Sim,SIB
224	956	Scotland	215	723	Carn nan Gobhar	992	137	3,255	449	12A	25	[57.451540459002;-4.8799183593253 NH273438]	Hu,M,Sim
225	736	Scotland	216	555	Sgairneach Mhor	991	182	3,251	597	05A	42	[56.828167285903;-4.2991204120728 NN598731]	Ma,M,Sim
226	1701	Scotland	217	1322	Stob Choire a' Mhail	990	66	3,248	217	04A	41	[56.749319510668;-5.0058820159117 NN163660]	MT,Sim
227	1725	Scotland	218	1343	Sgurr nan Spainteach	990	65	3,248	213	11A	33	[57.18167422533;-5.3256313378192 NG991150]	MT,Sim
228	808	Scotland	219	608	Sgurr Ban	989	165	3,245	541	14A	19	[57.718039061943;-5.2672243101618 NH055745]	Ma,M,Sim
229	262	Scotland	220	195	Beinn Eunaich	989	425	3,245	1,394	03C	50	[56.449468524232;-5.0275906973933 NN135327]	Ma,M,Sim
230	1637	Scotland	221	1270	Creag Leacach	988	71	3,242	232	07A	43	[56.854195193194;-3.3888547707033 NO154745]	M,Sim
231	525	Ireland	4	73	Cnoc na Peiste	988	254	3,241	833	50C	78	[51.997233439185;-9.6969433115726 V835841]	Ma,F,Sim,Hew,Dil,A,VL
232	23	Scotland	222	18	Gulvain	987	842	3,238	2,762	10D	41	[56.935527511708;-5.2855839474285 NN002875]	Ma,M,Sim
233	246	Scotland	223	181	Lurg Mhor	987	442	3,238	1,450	12A	25	[57.412617119526;-5.2249616729303 NH064404]	Ma,M,Sim
234	1235	Scotland	224	944	Druim Shionnach	987	101	3,238	331	10A	33	[57.126038579109;-5.1834561338446 NH074084]	Hu,M,Sim
235	1236	Scotland	225	945	Conival	987	101	3,238	331	16E	15	[58.13535827554;-4.8839811226976 NC303199]	Hu,M,Sim
236	1618	Scotland	226	1256	Sgurr an Fhuarail	987	71	3,238	233	11A	33	[57.174524756738;-5.2207258641952 NH054139]	MT,Sim
237	1540	Scotland	227	1196	Mam nan Carn	986	76	3,235	249	06B	43	[56.88269427196;-3.5622336054078 NO049779]	MT,Sim
238	118	Scotland	228	82	Beinn Alligin - Sgurr Mhor	986	601	3,235	1,972	13A	19 24	[57.59018432019;-5.5737882637389 NG865612]	Ma,M,Sim
239	718	Scotland	229	539	Sgurr Dearg - Inaccessible Pinnacle	986	187	3,235	614	17B	32	[57.212704232834;-6.234835201104 NG444215]	Ma,M,Sim
240	27	Scotland	230	22	Ben Vorlich	985	834	3,232	2,736	01B	57	[56.342539458229;-4.2196495082979 NN629189]	Ma,M,Sim
241	1977	Scotland	231	1542	Stob a' Choire Liath Mhor	983	52	3,225	171	13A	25	[57.565507593573;-5.4592845961287 NG932581]	MT,Sim
242	2097	Scotland	232	1639	Creag an Dubh-loch	983	47	3,225	154	07A	44	[56.925605382197;-3.2633532452851 NO232823]	MT,Sim
243	2176	Scotland	233	1704	Sgurr an Lochan Uaine	983	44	3,225	144	08A	36 43	[57.07256581536;-3.6097961568144 NO025991]	MT,Sim
244	907	Scotland	234	683	Mullach na Dheiragain	982	144	3,222	472	11A	25 33	[57.283248508426;-5.1870709263335 NH080259]	Hu,M,Sim,sMa
245	2015	Scotland	235	1576	Stob Garbh	982	51	3,221	166	03C	50	[56.425442275067;-5.090563524779 NN095302]	MT,Sim
246	865	Scotland	236	652	An Gearanach	981	151	3,220	497	04A	41	[56.758333323998;-4.9673291472011 NN187669]	Ma,M,Sim
247	1045	Scotland	237	797	Stob Coire a' Chairn	981	125	3,220	409	04A	41	[56.750181134962;-4.9699578886295 NN185660]	Ma=,Hu,M,Sim
248	965	Scotland	238	731	Meall na Aighean	981	136	3,219	446	02A	51	[56.619996390915;-4.129964183204 NN694496]	Hu,M,Sim
249	99	Scotland	239	71	Slioch	981	626	3,219	2,054	14A	19	[57.666485048708;-5.3481282097727 NH004690]	Ma,M,Sim
250	953	Scotland	240	720	Maol Chinn-dearg	980	138	3,216	452	10A	33	[57.12695018956;-5.2529520038068 NH032087]	Hu,M,Sim
251	1086	Scotland	241	831	Sail Mhor	980	118	3,215	387	13A	19	[57.587300324171;-5.4513123178628 NG938605]	Hu,MT,Sim
252	528	Scotland	242	388	Beinn a' Chochuill	980	252	3,215	827	03C	50	[56.449330217618;-5.0697805315357 NN109328]	Ma,M,Sim
253	1756	Scotland	243	1369	Meikle Pap	980	63	3,215	207	07A	44	[56.959276423227;-3.2200922125747 NO259860]	MT,Sim
254	303	Scotland	244	225	Ciste Dhubh	979	388	3,212	1,273	11A	33	[57.199079294583;-5.2096172550844 NH062166]	Ma,M,Sim
255	1237	Scotland	245	946	Glas Mheall Mor	979	101	3,212	331	14A	19	[57.815795191045;-5.2407005696388 NH076853]	Hu,MT,Sim
256	1358	Scotland	246	1045	Stob Coire Sgriodain	979	90	3,212	295	04B	41	[56.831006416198;-4.6960062746044 NN356743]	M,Sim,sHu
257	13	England	1	1	Scafell Pike; Highest in England	978	912	3,209	2,992	34B	89 90	[54.454098242529;-3.2122852375454 NY215072]	Ma,F,Sim,Hew,N,W,B, Sy,Fel,CoH,CoU,CoA
258	675	Scotland	247	508	Beinn Dubhchraig	978	199	3,209	653	01D	50	[56.39045023185;-4.7441746746885 NN307254]	Ma,M,Sim
259	809	Scotland	248	609	Cona' Mheall	978	165	3,209	541	15A	20	[57.79071636333;-4.9035378342919 NH275816]	Ma,M,Sim
260	2150	Wales	7	126	Pen yr Ole Wen	978	45	3,209	148	30B	115	[53.137229258079;-4.0120522699082 SH655619]	F,Sim,Hew,N
261	1956	Scotland	249	1523	Meall Buidhe	977	53	3,206	174	02A	50	[56.557410919753;-4.6716236870784 NN359438]	MT,Sim
262	769	Scotland	250	576	Stob Ban	977	174	3,205	571	04A	41	[56.809791066517;-4.8419485341545 NN266723]	Ma,M,Sim
263	1033	Scotland	251	786	Meall nan Ceapraichean	977	126	3,205	413	15A	20	[57.798093022022;-4.9344287574835 NH257825]	Hu,M,Sim
264	631	Scotland	252	475	Beinn a' Ghlo - Carn Liath	976	211	3,202	692	06B	43	[56.807506384884;-3.7441891393931 NN936698]	Ma,M,Sim
265	1168	Scotland	253	893	Coinneach Mhor	976	108	3,202	354	13A	19	[57.583090764603;-5.4408714866991 NG944600]	Hu,MT,Sim
266	1957	Scotland	254	1524	Meall Garbh	976	53	3,202	174	04B	41	[56.81717668196;-4.6704303454042 NN371727]	MT,Sim
267	2436	Scotland	255	1921	Meall Buidhe	976	36	3,202	118	08A	35 36	[57.078510825812;-3.8311375269301 NH891001]	MT,Sim
268	2247	Wales	8	132	Foel Grach	975	42	3,200	137	30B	115	[53.173987004883;-3.9643941278459 SH688659]	F,Sim,Hew,N
269	529	Scotland	256	389	Stuc a' Chroin	975	252	3,199	827	01B	57	[56.328724353837;-4.2382580461179 NN617174]	Ma,M,Sim
270	439	Scotland	257	325	Carn a' Gheoidh	975	298	3,199	978	06B	43	[56.873071465003;-3.4666687251977 NO107767]	Ma,M,Sim
271	30	Scotland	258	23	Ben Lomond	974	820	3,196	2,690	01C	56	[56.189733457357;-4.6331055697977 NN367028]	Ma,M,Sim,CoH
272	187	Scotland	259	131	Beinn Sgritheall	974	500	3,196	1,640	10A	33	[57.153060847221;-5.5811044807306 NG835126]	Ma,M,Sim
273	2050	Scotland	260	1603	Mullach Sithidh	974	49	3,196	161	11A	25 33	[57.287816975124;-5.1841462388736 NH082264]	MT,Sim
274	2317	Scotland	261	1818	Meall Mor	974	39	3,196	128	12A	25	[57.413853922581;-5.2117446953999 NH072405]	MT,Sim
275	1639	Scotland	262	1272	Meall Coire na Saobhaidhe	974	70	3,196	230	07A	44	[56.969778016842;-3.2483992439679 NO242872]	MT,Sim
276	1131	Scotland	263	867	A' Mharconaich	973	112	3,193	367	05A	42	[56.856174345812;-4.2909970427551 NN604762]	Hu,M,Sim
277	1046	Scotland	264	798	Sgurr a' Ghreadaidh	973	124	3,192	407	17B	32	[57.227093384844;-6.2348288382392 NG445231]	Hu,M,Sim
278	2249	Ireland	5	201	Maolan Bui	973	41	3,192	135	50C	78	[51.994475534343;-9.7012070232296 V832838]	F,Sim,Hew,Dil,A,VL
279	1775	Scotland	265	1385	Creag an Dail Mhor	972	62	3,189	203	08B	36 43	[57.066607393199;-3.4347139568809 NO131982]	MT,Sim
280	1726	Scotland	266	1344	Sgurr Ban	970	65	3,182	213	13A	19	[57.584446267141;-5.3907895120686 NG974600]	MT,Sim
281	2487	Scotland	267	1963	Meall an t-Snaim	970	35	3,182	115	09C	34	[56.979026855368;-4.5371762899606 NN459904]	MT,Sim
282	1204	Scotland	268	922	Meall Garbh	968	104	3,176	341	02A	42 51	[56.636616448742;-4.2075441660569 NN647516]	Hu,M,Sim
283	1213	Scotland	269	928	Stob an Fhuarain	968	103	3,176	338	03B	41	[56.624625806788;-5.0693329785136 NN118523]	Hu,MT,Sim
284	100	Scotland	270	72	Aonach Eagach - Sgorr nam Fiannaidh	968	623	3,175	2,044	03A	41	[56.679331136;-5.0378588308131 NN140583]	Ma,M,Sim
285	247	Scotland	271	182	A' Mhaighdean	967	442	3,173	1,450	14A	19	[57.719522683564;-5.3479900536976 NH007749]	Ma,M,Sim
286	1444	Scotland	272	1112	Carn na Con Dhu	967	82	3,173	269	11A	25 33	[57.266767775102;-5.1989182637722 NH072241]	MT,Sim
287	1908	Scotland	273	1486	Sron An Isean	967	55	3,171	180	03C	50	[56.433677467013;-5.08474240876 NN099311]	MT,Sim
288	1445	Scotland	274	1113	Meall na Dige	966	82	3,169	269	01C	51	[56.369328806197;-4.5110707908477 NN450225]	MT,Sim
289	7	Scotland	275	5	Ben More	966	966	3,169	3,169	17E	47 48	[56.424106997002;-6.0152005136723 NM525330]	Ma,M,Sim,SIB
290	1115	Scotland	276	855	Sgurr na Banachdich	965	114	3,166	374	17B	32	[57.220543434353;-6.242366012629 NG440224]	Hu,M,Sim
291	658	Scotland	277	495	Sgurr nan Gillean	964	203	3,163	666	17B	32	[57.248245705766;-6.1941244007479 NG471253]	Ma,M,Sim
292	989	England	2	69	Scafell	964	132	3,162	434	34B	89 90	[54.446770249788;-3.2259484116802 NY206064]	Hu,F,Sim,Hew,N,W,B,Sy,Fel
293	390	Scotland	278	288	Carn a' Chlamain	964	317	3,161	1,040	06A	43	[56.860895799689;-3.7811202093869 NN915758]	Ma,M,Sim
294	105	Scotland	279	75	Sgurr Thuilm	963	614	3,159	2,014	10D	40	[56.936353307773;-5.3892553872561 NM939879]	Ma,M,Sim
295	1092	Scotland	280	833	Sgurr nan Fhir Duibhe	963	117	3,159	384	13A	19	[57.584759697775;-5.3791030760969 NG981600]	Hu,MT,Sim
296	1727	Scotland	281	1345	Sgurr a' Bhuic	963	65	3,159	213	04A	41	[56.787700988612;-4.9418092521066 NN204701]	MT,Sim
297	1776	Scotland	282	1386	Sgurr Choinnich Beag	963	62	3,159	203	04A	41	[56.796390180972;-4.9162817720644 NN220710]	MT,Sim
298	31	Scotland	283	24	Ben Klibreck	962	819	3,156	2,687	16D	16	[58.235021701127;-4.411621752751 NC585299]	Ma,M,Sim
299	2073	Scotland	284	1620	Sgurr a' Dubh Doire	962	48	3,156	157	11A	33	[57.214926926879;-5.2573832256731 NH034185]	MT,Sim
300	1867	Wales	9	109	Yr Elen	962	57	3,156	187	30B	115	[53.166428082757;-3.9864894591475 SH673651]	F,Sim,Hew,N
301	1266	Scotland	285	969	Gulvain South Top	961	98	3,153	322	10D	40	[56.925402906871;-5.294556606967 NM996864]	MT,Sim,sHu
302	1652	Scotland	286	1282	Carn na Criche	961	69	3,153	226	14B	20	[57.70598246444;-5.0293855340572 NH196725]	MT,Sim
303	52	Scotland	287	41	Sgorr Ruadh	961	723	3,152	2,372	13B	25	[57.498589147939;-5.407861727508 NG959505]	Ma,M,Sim
304	2611	Scotland	288	2066	Glas Mheall Liath	960	32	3,151	106	14A	19	[57.80507691396;-5.2380546062812 NH077841]	MT,Sim
305	204	Scotland	289	145	Stuchd an Lochain	960	482	3,150	1,581	02A	51	[56.570556526319;-4.470673479562 NN483448]	Ma,M,Sim
306	1034	Scotland	290	787	Stob Cadha Gobhlach	960	126	3,150	413	14A	19	[57.790341417263;-5.2518813019414 NH068825]	Hu,MT,Sim
307	2098	Scotland	291	1640	Ben More Assynt South Top	960	47	3,150	154	16E	15	[58.129880010799;-4.8478626521617 NC324192]	MT,Sim
308	2151	Scotland	292	1684	Stob a' Choire Odhair	960	45	3,150	148	10B	33	[57.078411586557;-5.582154092137 NG830043]	MT,Sim
309	357	Scotland	293	261	Beinn nan Aighenan	960	343	3,150	1,125	03C	50	[56.51995912182;-5.0120749316131 NN148405]	Ma,M,Sim
310	149	Scotland	294	101	Meall Glas	959	554	3,146	1,818	02B	51	[56.454864233393;-4.5475528594112 NN431321]	Ma,M,Sim
311	183	Scotland	295	127	Beinn Fhionnlaidh	959	510	3,146	1,673	03B	50	[56.600372683101;-5.1048453437743 NN095497]	Ma,M,Sim
312	217	Scotland	296	155	Buachaille Etive Beag - Stob Dubh	958	469	3,143	1,539	03B	41	[56.637802863101;-4.9709013154678 NN179535]	Ma,M,Sim
313	1041	Scotland	297	793	Bruach na Frithe	958	125	3,143	410	17B	32	[57.246740710513;-6.2122014538141 NG460252]	Hu,M,Sim
314	2152	Scotland	298	1685	Stob Coire Sgriodain South Top	958	45	3,143	148	04B	41	[56.826625664545;-4.6907736728995 NN359738]	MT,Sim
315	2530	Scotland	299	2000	Stob Coire na Gaibhre	958	34	3,143	112	04A	41	[56.840072937919;-4.8540837796572 NN260757]	MT,Sim
316	1928	Ireland	6	182	Cnoc an Chuillinn	958	54	3,143	177	50C	78	[51.989794129414;-9.7141322023027 V823833]	F,Sim,Hew,Dil,A,VL
317	1592	Scotland	300	1235	Tolmount	958	72	3,143	236	07A	44	[56.904578574317;-3.2987684084368 NO210800]	M,Sim
318	1205	Scotland	301	923	Stob Garbh	958	104	3,142	341	01C	51	[56.364444433769;-4.5738991807817 NN411221]	Hu,MT,Sim
319	1777	Scotland	302	1387	Carn Ghluasaid	957	62	3,140	203	11B	34	[57.16573646857;-5.0694028949036 NH145125]	M,Sim
320	1619	Scotland	303	1257	Tom Buidhe	957	71	3,140	233	07A	44	[56.892954264139;-3.2934402709799 NO213787]	M,Sim
321	2388	Ireland	7	207	Na Cnamha	957	37	3,138	122	50C	78	[52.000980049721;-9.7480522968385 V800846]	F,Sim,Hew,A,VL
322	1620	Scotland	304	1258	Stob nan Clach	956	71	3,136	233	02B	50	[56.480302987061;-4.620721970188 NN387351]	MT,Sim
323	572	Scotland	305	426	Sgùrr nan Coireachan	956	234	3,136	768	10D	40	[56.935588339506;-5.4500304841573 NM902880]	Ma,M,Sim
324	1337	Scotland	306	1028	Saileag	956	91	3,136	299	11A	33	[57.181011981102;-5.2825346423297 NH017148]	M,Sim,sHu
325	1621	Scotland	307	1259	Sron Coire na h-Iolaire	956	71	3,136	233	04B	42	[56.801291931786;-4.4366993726422 NN513704]	MT,Sim
326	2609	Scotland	308	2064	Sgor Eilde Beag	956	33	3,135	107	04A	41	[56.745212023835;-4.9139482172004 NN219653]	MT,Sim
327	434	Scotland	309	322	Sgor Gaibhre	955	300	3,133	984	04B	42	[56.772111519293;-4.5477414503746 NN444674]	Ma,M,Sim
328	2346	Scotland	310	1844	Meall Dearg	955	38	3,133	125	13A	25	[57.562841255402;-5.4908131374958 NG913579]	MT,Sim
329	1156	Scotland	311	883	Beinn Liath Mhor Fannaich	954	109	3,130	358	14B	20	[57.706002609175;-4.9907702761822 NH219724]	Hu,M,Sim
330	1375	Scotland	312	1058	Tom a' Choinnich	954	89	3,130	292	15B	20	[57.693474422671;-4.5802377918679 NH463700]	MT,Sim
331	1728	Scotland	313	1346	Meall an Fhuarain Mhoir	954	65	3,130	213	11A	33	[57.223276218759;-5.3161203573051 NG999196]	MT,Sim
332	1892	Scotland	314	1472	Sail Liath	954	56	3,130	184	14A	19	[57.789573893676;-5.2467630635969 NH071824]	MT,Sim
333	974	Scotland	315	736	Buachaille Etive Mor - Stob na Broige	953	135	3,128	442	03B	41	[56.629257578858;-4.9522906143355 NN190525]	Hu,M,Sim
334	400	Scotland	316	296	Beinn Mhanach	953	315	3,127	1,033	02A	50	[56.533667533183;-4.6471796297773 NN373411]	Ma,M,Sim
335	326	Scotland	317	241	Am Faochagach	953	367	3,127	1,204	15A	20	[57.771152502377;-4.8548723242616 NH303793]	Ma,M,Sim
336	609	Scotland	318	457	Sgùrr nan Coireachan	953	220	3,127	722	10B	33 40	[57.006928437123;-5.4055638037521 NM933958]	Ma,M,Sim
337	1195	Scotland	319	914	Beinn Iutharn Bheag	953	105	3,127	344	06B	43	[56.893795958207;-3.5364303763832 NO065791]	Hu,MT,Sim
338	1072	Scotland	320	820	Aonach Eagach - Meall Dearg	952	120	3,124	394	03A	41	[56.680161964755;-5.0036322779278 NN161583]	Hu,M,Sim
339	2023	Scotland	321	1583	Beinn Fhada	952	50	3,123	164	03B	41	[56.641506451682;-5.0038193171727 NN159540]	MT,Sim
340	10	Ireland	8	2	Brandon Mountain	952	927	3,122	3,041	49A	70	[52.235056426194;-10.254966860288 Q460116]	Ma,F,Sim,Hew,Dil,A,VL
341	2725	Scotland	322	2167	Beinn nan Eachan East Top	951	30	3,121	99	02B	51	[56.515062783632;-4.3191322028437 NN574383]	Sim,xMT
342	222	Scotland	323	160	Meall Chuaich	951	466	3,120	1,529	05B	42	[56.963543769582;-4.1133474149124 NN716878]	Ma,M,Sim
343	56	England	3	2	Helvellyn	950	712	3,117	2,336	34C	90	[54.526890165364;-3.0182022417055 NY342151]	Ma,F,Sim,Hew,N,W,B,Sy,Fel,CoH
344	1116	Scotland	324	856	Meall Gorm	949	114	3,114	374	14B	20	[57.680068750555;-4.9852766662885 NH221695]	Hu,M,Sim
345	124	Scotland	325	85	Beinn Bhuidhe	949	592	3,112	1,942	01D	50 56	[56.326494137262;-4.907827798614 NN203187]	Ma,M,Sim
346	1893	Scotland	326	1473	Sgurr Mhic Choinnich	948	56	3,110	184	17B	32	[57.208559217875;-6.2244162472294 NG450210]	M,Sim
347	1300	Scotland	327	999	Creag Dubh	947	94	3,107	308	12B	25	[57.369726169525;-4.996600843579 NH199350]	MT,Sim,sHu
348	2125	Scotland	328	1665	Sgorr Bhan	947	46	3,107	151	03B	41	[56.65553194976;-5.1632391275633 NN062560]	MT,Sim
349	2668	Scotland	329	2116	A' Chioch	947	31	3,107	102	11B	34	[57.188443861469;-5.1325401188727 NH108152]	MT,Sim
350	564	Wales	10	36	Y Garn	947	236	3,107	774	30B	115	[53.115032332707;-4.0483721779935 SH630595]	Ma,F,Sim,Hew,N
351	946	Scotland	330	715	Driesh	947	138	3,107	453	07A	44	[56.847199908998;-3.1967677712257 NO271735]	Hu,M,Sim
352	190	Scotland	331	133	Meall Buidhe	946	496	3,104	1,627	10B	33 40	[57.030840392476;-5.547892710739 NM848989]	Ma,M,Sim
353	540	Scotland	332	400	Sgurr na Sgine	946	247	3,104	810	10A	33	[57.14650281636;-5.3968915258642 NG946113]	Ma,M,Sim
354	1474	Scotland	333	1139	Creag a' Mhaim	946	80	3,104	262	10A	33	[57.120302913436;-5.1614814170969 NH087077]	M,Sim
355	1063	Scotland	334	812	Beinn Tulaichean	946	122	3,103	400	01C	56	[56.342174267592;-4.5643069691744 NN416196]	Hu,M,Sim
356	126	Scotland	335	87	Carn Dearg	946	591	3,103	1,939	09B	35	[57.091378834002;-4.254319714222 NH635023]	Ma,M,Sim
357	723	Scotland	336	544	Carn Bhac	945	187	3,101	613	06B	43	[56.930329388629;-3.5609380384905 NO051832]	Ma,M,Sim
358	640	Scotland	337	484	Bidein a' Choire Sheasgaich	945	209	3,100	686	12A	25	[57.419150461867;-5.2505263154678 NH049412]	Ma,M,Sim
359	471	Scotland	338	346	Stob a' Choire Odhair	945	277	3,100	909	03C	50	[56.572578950303;-4.8387730072372 NN257459]	Ma,M,Sim
360	1773	Wales	11	102	Foel-fras	944	63	3,097	206	30B	115	[53.19394779255;-3.9533308694366 SH696681]	F,Sim,Hew,N
361	1376	Scotland	339	1059	Sgurr Dubh Mor	944	89	3,097	292	17B	32	[57.204468783134;-6.2123489036116 NG457205]	M,Sim
362	714	Scotland	340	536	An Socach	944	188	3,097	617	06B	43	[56.902158576757;-3.5137854505905 NO079800]	Ma,M,Sim
363	681	Scotland	341	514	Binnein Beag	943	197	3,094	646	04A	41	[56.766821094361;-4.9123500825773 NN221677]	Ma,M,Sim
364	96	Scotland	342	70	Ben Vorlich	943	632	3,094	2,073	01D	50 56	[56.273359840528;-4.7551643241103 NN295124]	Ma,M,Sim,CoH
365	1864	Scotland	343	1451	Carn Ban	942	57	3,091	187	09B	35	[57.098440852276;-4.2613525317922 NH631031]	MT,Sim
366	2727	Scotland	344	2169	Meall Buidhe SE Top	942	30	3,091	98	10B	33 40	[57.029233586766;-5.5411447101788 NM852987]	MT,Sim
367	1556	Scotland	345	1208	Carn Cloich-mhuilinn	942	75	3,091	246	08A	43	[56.994999758396;-3.7002756735193 NN968906]	MT,Sim
368	1567	Scotland	346	1217	Am Bodach	942	75	3,090	244	03A	41	[56.677745390829;-4.9920094408062 NN168580]	MT,Sim
369	955	Scotland	347	722	Beinn a' Chroin	941	137	3,089	450	01C	50 56	[56.331322701346;-4.6104961793792 NN387185]	Hu,M,Sim
370	612	Scotland	348	460	Carn Dearg	941	218	3,087	715	04B	42	[56.759535024444;-4.5910671483163 NN417661]	Ma,M,Sim
371	2224	Scotland	349	1744	Stob a' Bhruaich Leith	941	42	3,087	138	03C	50	[56.570733752323;-4.9184172305455 NN208459]	MT,Sim
372	376	Scotland	350	277	Carn na Caim	941	327	3,087	1,073	05B	42	[56.911276206898;-4.1744557270807 NN677821]	Ma,M,Sim
373	1754	Scotland	351	1367	Beinn a' Chroin East Top	940	63	3,084	207	01C	50 56	[56.331526677749;-4.6008029574951 NN393185]	MT,Sim
374	1794	Scotland	352	1399	Stob Coire Leith	939	62	3,082	202	03A	41	[56.680585473174;-5.0232624683677 NN149584]	MT,Sim
375	1325	Scotland	353	1018	Mullach nan Coirean	939	92	3,082	303	04A	41	[56.749480297255;-5.0729727555808 NN122662]	M,Sim,sHu
376	519	Scotland	354	381	Luinne Bheinn	939	255	3,081	837	10B	33	[57.047954394089;-5.5148868505541 NG869007]	Ma,M,Sim
377	2074	Scotland	355	1621	Spidean Dhomhuill Bhric	939	48	3,081	157	10A	33	[57.159770290063;-5.4378148961777 NG922129]	MT,Sim
378	1640	Ireland	9	162	The Big Gun	939	70	3,081	230	50C	78	[52.000931298558;-9.6898021336742 V840845]	F,Sim,Hew,Dil,A,VL
379	405	Scotland	356	298	Mount Keen	939	312	3,081	1,024	07B	44	[56.969522937438;-2.973695601085 NO409869]	Ma,M,Sim
380	2482	Scotland	357	1959	Stob Coire Altruim	939	35	3,080	116	03B	41	[56.634013532182;-4.9412454629067 NN197530]	MT,Sim
381	1978	Scotland	358	1543	Sgurr Dubh an Da Bheinn	938	52	3,077	171	17B	32	[57.2034619402;-6.2155480341427 NG455204]	MT,Sim
382	2250	Scotland	359	1766	Druim Shionnach West Top	938	41	3,077	135	10A	33	[57.1237404055;-5.203090414102 NH062082]	MT,Sim
383	2225	Scotland	360	1745	An Socach East Top	938	42	3,077	138	06B	43	[56.907022670302;-3.4827798921819 NO098805]	MT,Sim
384	1508	Scotland	361	1169	Beinn Cheathaich	937	78	3,074	256	02B	51	[56.459782792791;-4.5267796886196 NN444326]	MT,Sim
385	101	Scotland	362	73	Sron a' Choire Ghairbh	937	622	3,074	2,041	10C	34	[57.007301119926;-4.9294852548885 NN222945]	Ma,M,Sim
386	647	Scotland	363	487	Beinn Tarsuinn	937	206	3,074	676	14A	19	[57.701202449262;-5.292569912024 NH039727]	Ma,M,Sim
387	77	Scotland	364	57	Beinn Sgulaird	937	662	3,074	2,172	03B	50	[56.565458415772;-5.1703638399899 NN053460]	Ma,M,Sim
388	1157	Scotland	365	884	A' Bhuidheanach Bheag	936	109	3,071	358	05B	42	[56.869494527401;-4.1999232909391 NN660775]	Hu,M,Sim
389	2656	Scotland	366	2104	Sgurr a' Fionn Choire	936	32	3,071	104	17B	32	[57.246962511079;-6.2055909971732 NG464252]	MT,Sim
390	1863	England	4	126	Broad Crag	935	58	3,069	189	34B	89 90	[54.456840065884;-3.2077385803519 NY218075]	F,Sim,Hew,N,B,Sy
391	280	Scotland	367	208	Beinn na Lap	935	406	3,068	1,332	04B	41	[56.788635389043;-4.6602127944936 NN376695]	Ma,M,Sim
392	1702	Scotland	368	1323	Toman Coinnich	935	66	3,068	217	14B	20	[57.693267895043;-5.1088887291091 NH148713]	MT,Sim
393	1107	Scotland	369	847	Meall a' Chrasgaidh	934	115	3,064	377	14B	20	[57.712674880123;-5.0500969342735 NH184733]	Hu,M,Sim
394	1894	Scotland	370	1474	Sgurr an Tuill Bhain	934	56	3,064	184	14A	19	[57.665310060299;-5.3245370481191 NH018688]	MT,Sim
395	2051	Scotland	371	1604	Am Basteir	934	49	3,064	161	17B	32	[57.247913774716;-6.204040540399 NG465253]	M,Sim
396	80	Scotland	372	60	Fionn Bheinn	933	658	3,061	2,159	14B	20	[57.610711255982;-5.1035046696556 NH147621]	Ma,M,Sim
397	179	Scotland	373	124	Maol Chean-dearg	933	514	3,061	1,686	13B	25	[57.49161979193;-5.4656416290436 NG924499]	Ma,M,Sim
398	1042	Scotland	374	794	The Cairnwell	933	125	3,061	410	06B	43	[56.878972008938;-3.4225932212919 NO134773]	Hu,M,Sim
399	403	Scotland	375	297	Beinn Chabhair	932	313	3,058	1,027	01C	50 56	[56.32525252671;-4.6424336787894 NN367179]	Ma,M,Sim
400	395	Scotland	376	293	Meall Buidhe	932	316	3,058	1,037	02A	51	[56.616814592101;-4.4492460310876 NN498499]	Ma,M,Sim
401	2622	Ireland	10	220	Cruach Mhor	932	32	3,058	105	50C	78	[52.003626237305;-9.6899036221272 V840848]	F,Sim,Hew,Dil,A,VL
402	86	Scotland	377	65	Ben Chonzie	931	648	3,054	2,126	01A	51 52	[56.453338347621;-3.9924243992388 NN773308]	Ma,M,Sim
403	1909	Scotland	378	1487	Beinn Fhada NE Top	931	55	3,054	180	03B	41	[56.644394244972;-4.995891755715 NN164543]	MT,Sim
404	57	England	5	3	Skiddaw	931	709	3,054	2,326	34A	89 90	[54.650648140514;-3.14838446366 NY260290]	Ma,F,Sim,Hew,N,W,B,Sy,Fel
405	1436	Scotland	379	1104	Beinn Bhreac	931	83	3,054	272	08B	36 43	[57.054395516026;-3.5546004111491 NO058970]	M,Sim
406	2070	England	6	140	Ill Crag	931	49	3,054	159	34B	89 90	[54.45511990312;-3.1999754200136 NY223073]	F,Sim,Hew,N,B,Sy
407	2488	Scotland	380	1964	Meall Cruidh	930	35	3,051	115	03C	50	[56.528178342119;-5.0436307222342 NN129415]	MT,Sim
408	1167	Scotland	381	892	A' Chailleach	929	108	3,049	355	09B	35	[57.108878503566;-4.1794170272528 NH681041]	Hu,M,Sim
409	1028	Scotland	382	781	Sgor Choinnich	929	127	3,048	417	04B	42	[56.780155280724;-4.5499240238703 NN443683]	Hu,MT,Sim
410	19	Scotland	383	15	Bla Bheinn	929	862	3,048	2,828	17B	32	[57.219158395354;-6.0946747503885 NG529217]	Ma,M,Sim
411	1180	Scotland	384	901	Sgurr nan Saighead	929	108	3,048	353	11A	33	[57.205138883804;-5.3559017037542 NG974177]	Hu,MT,Sim
412	2347	Scotland	385	1845	Tigh Mor na Seilge (NNE Top)	929	38	3,048	125	11B	34	[57.202311004868;-5.0807203973554 NH140166]	MT,Sim
413	1885	Scotland	386	1466	Am Fasarinen	929	57	3,047	186	13A	25	[57.558818840514;-5.4737024020063 NG923574]	MT,Sim
414	122	Scotland	387	84	Moruisg	928	594	3,045	1,949	12A	25	[57.499381568059;-5.1708416738002 NH101499]	Ma,M,Sim
415	991	Scotland	388	751	Glas Leathad Beag	928	132	3,045	433	15B	20	[57.699840411747;-4.5320161454501 NH492706]	Hu,MT,Sim
416	770	Scotland	389	577	Meall nan Eun	928	174	3,045	571	03C	50	[56.561148217468;-4.9437239410559 NN192449]	Ma,M,Sim
417	1139	Scotland	390	871	Mayar	928	111	3,045	364	07A	44	[56.848498761613;-3.2476366136984 NO240737]	Hu,M,Sim
418	1651	Scotland	391	1281	Glas Mheall Mor	928	69	3,044	227	05B	42	[56.864681671796;-4.1668279886934 NN680769]	MT,Sim
419	2437	Scotland	392	1922	Sron Chona Choirein	927	36	3,041	118	02A	51	[56.568186029047;-4.4542399546448 NN493445]	MT,Sim
420	43	Scotland	393	35	Ben Hope	927	772	3,041	2,533	16B	9	[58.412654740296;-4.6086743310405 NC477501]	Ma,M,Sim
421	801	Scotland	394	603	Eididh nan Clach Geala	927	166	3,041	545	15A	20	[57.813342487089;-4.9356683429367 NH257842]	Ma,M,Sim
422	451	Scotland	395	333	Beinn Narnain	927	290	3,041	951	01D	56	[56.220444558126;-4.7900819637544 NN271066]	Ma,M,Sim
423	1004	Scotland	396	762	Sgurr nan Eag	926	130	3,039	427	17B	32	[57.195510127989;-6.2113271353045 NG457195]	Hu,M,Sim
424	484	Scotland	397	356	Beinn Liath Mhor	926	271	3,038	889	13B	25	[57.511367393552;-5.4007028216356 NG964519]	Ma,M,Sim
425	531	Scotland	398	391	Seana Bhraigh	926	251	3,038	823	15A	20	[57.84656449353;-4.8979216560711 NH281878]	Ma,M,Sim
426	1245	Scotland	399	950	Geal Charn	926	100	3,038	328	09B	35	[57.056812579932;-4.3742612827124 NN561987]	Hu,M,Sim
427	2348	Scotland	400	1846	Sgurr Thormaid	926	38	3,038	125	17B	32	[57.222390955344;-6.2409205695793 NG441226]	MT,Sim
428	871	Scotland	401	657	Meall a' Choire Leith	926	151	3,037	494	02B	51	[56.565572730639;-4.2603710539301 NN612438]	Ma,M,Sim
429	757	Scotland	402	567	Buachaille Etive Beag - Stob Coire Raineach	925	177	3,035	581	03B	41	[56.649931392512;-4.9522756577373 NN191548]	Ma,M,Sim
430	2349	Scotland	403	1847	Diollaid a' Chairn	925	38	3,035	125	04B	42	[56.848021396005;-4.4823778989358 NN487757]	MT,Sim
431	2569	Wales	12	145	Garnedd Uchaf	925	33	3,035	108	30B	115	[53.182921219269;-3.9677957656783 SH686669]	F,Sim,Hew,N
432	21	Ireland	11	3	Lugnaquilla	925	849	3,035	2,785	55A	56	[52.966457883336;-6.4647780180259 T032917]	Ma,F,Sim,Hew,Dil, A,VL,CoH,CoU
433	1582	Scotland	404	1229	An Sgorr	924	73	3,031	240	02A	42 51	[56.630129679013;-4.2185783240322 NN640509]	MT,Sim
434	1196	Scotland	405	915	Creag Pitridh	924	105	3,031	344	04B	34 42	[56.899178642129;-4.4857724455626 NN487814]	Hu,M,Sim
435	627	Wales	13	39	Elidir Fawr	924	212	3,031	696	30B	115	[53.129811827725;-4.0774764117155 SH611612]	Ma,F,Sim,Hew,N
436	880	Scotland	406	664	An Coileachan	924	148	3,031	487	14B	20	[57.667399539669;-4.9506910452888 NH241680]	Hu,M,Sim,sMa
437	1158	Scotland	407	885	Sgurr nan Each	923	109	3,028	358	14B	20	[57.680384686532;-5.0473818257857 NH184697]	Hu,M,Sim
438	1729	Wales	14	98	Crib Goch	923	65	3,028	213	30B	115	[53.075351597742;-4.0554449178534 SH624551]	F,Sim,Hew,N
439	1569	Scotland	408	1219	Beinn a' Chuirn	923	74	3,028	243	02A	50	[56.53142088554;-4.6681661040188 NN360409]	MT,Sim
440	844	Scotland	409	636	Beinn Alligin - Tom na Gruagaich	922	155	3,025	509	13A	19 24	[57.580038996509;-5.5828339265705 NG859601]	Ma,M,Sim
441	2318	Scotland	410	1819	Mullach Coire nan Nead	922	39	3,025	128	04B	42	[56.825488421978;-4.5743137129781 NN430734]	MT,Sim
442	2616	Scotland	411	2071	Meall nan Tarmachan SE Top	922	32	3,023	106	02B	51	[56.517310599324;-4.2948850630438 NN589385]	MT,Sim
443	1053	Scotland	412	803	An Socach	921	123	3,022	404	11A	25 33	[57.256676826743;-5.1715053786473 NH088229]	Hu,M,Sim
444	1617	Scotland	413	1255	Carn Sgulain	920	72	3,019	235	09B	35	[57.12419600205;-4.1770129845504 NH683058]	M,Sim
445	1298	Scotland	414	997	Meall Cuanail	920	95	3,019	310	03C	50	[56.418106347249;-5.1321352762028 NN069295]	MT,Sim,sHu
446	409	Scotland	415	302	Sgiath Chuil	920	311	3,018	1,020	02B	51	[56.452295735203;-4.4970692959101 NN462317]	Ma,M,Sim
447	1929	Scotland	416	1502	Geal-charn	920	54	3,018	177	08A	35 36	[57.090013586961;-3.8432577027365 NH884014]	MT,Sim
448	2391	Scotland	417	1883	Crow Craigies	920	37	3,018	121	07A	44	[56.902985539213;-3.279009136619 NO222798]	MT,Sim
449	2068	Scotland	418	1617	Carn Ballach (SW Top)	920	49	3,018	160	09B	35	[57.110465501288;-4.242267182136 NH643044]	MT,Sim
450	150	Scotland	419	102	Gairich	919	552	3,015	1,811	10B	33	[57.04413936271;-5.2572465871757 NN025995]	Ma,M,Sim
451	1703	Scotland	420	1324	Sgurr Leac nan Each	919	66	3,015	217	10A	33	[57.163130401988;-5.4463999244332 NG917133]	MT,Sim
452	798	Scotland	421	600	Ruadh Stac Mor	919	167	3,014	548	14A	19	[57.726286127885;-5.3301335343004 NH018756]	Ma,M,Sim,xC
453	279	Scotland	422	207	A' Ghlas-bheinn	918	407	3,012	1,335	11A	25 33	[57.255056380428;-5.3040503397452 NH008231]	Ma,M,Sim
454	710	Scotland	423	533	Creag nan Damh	918	189	3,012	620	10A	33	[57.147245744778;-5.335768827607 NG983112]	Ma,M,Sim
455	1622	Scotland	424	1260	Sgurr a' Mhadaidh	918	71	3,012	233	17B	32	[57.230732498846;-6.2335884095338 NG446235]	M,Sim
456	2285	Scotland	425	1796	Tom Dubh	918	40	3,012	131	08A	36 43	[57.035227925759;-3.779567576879 NN921952]	MT,Sim
457	2438	Scotland	426	1923	Stuc Fraoch Choire	918	36	3,012	118	11A	25 33	[57.276682246636;-5.2329692145998 NH052253]	MT,Sim
458	2531	Scotland	427	2001	Tom na Sroine	918	34	3,012	112	04A	41	[56.82729201036;-4.9399967756404 NN207745]	MT,Sim
459	1704	Scotland	428	1325	Stob an Duine Ruaidh	918	66	3,012	217	03C	50	[56.522596409877;-5.0513140108657 NN124409]	MT,Sim
460	29	Ireland	12	5	Galtymore	918	821	3,011	2,694	53A	74	[52.365191271282;-8.1798247381716 R878237]	Ma,F,Sim,Hew,Dil,A,VL,CoH,CoU
461	1686	Scotland	429	1310	Mullach nan Coirean SE Top	918	68	3,010	221	04A	41	[56.742665307937;-5.0576940519778 NN131654]	MT,Sim
462	704	Wales	15	44	Tryfan	918	191	3,010	627	30B	115	[53.11409867963;-3.9975236252502 SH664593]	Ma,F,Sim,Hew,N
463	752	Scotland	430	564	Geal-charn	917	178	3,009	584	05A	42	[56.873885369875;-4.3052094074573 NN596782]	Ma,M,Sim
464	1757	Scotland	431	1370	Carn Bhinnein	917	63	3,009	207	06B	43	[56.868270376654;-3.4927291715726 NO091762]	MT,Sim
465	422	Scotland	432	313	Meall na Teanga	917	306	3,008	1,002	10C	34	[56.988383999056;-4.9312908348278 NN220924]	Ma,M,Sim
466	2341	Scotland	433	1839	Mullach nan Coirean East Top	917	39	3,007	127	04A	41	[56.744699549285;-5.0480443599107 NN137656]	Sim
467	932	Scotland	434	704	Beinn a' Chleibh	916	141	3,006	463	01D	50	[56.390168507282;-4.8365196646879 NN250256]	Hu,M,Sim,sMa
468	2669	Scotland	435	2117	Stob Coire Dubh	916	31	3,005	102	09C	34	[56.991015739412;-4.4770777394816 NN496916]	MT,Sim
469	265	Scotland	436	196	Ben Vane	916	424	3,004	1,391	01D	56	[56.249378271094;-4.7825008126789 NN277098]	Ma,M,Sim
470	2069	Scotland	437	1618	Sgurr Dubh	915	49	3,003	160	14A	19	[57.703906929683;-5.2575548516036 NH060729]	MT,Sim
471	1073	Scotland	438	821	Carn Aosda	915	120	3,003	394	06B	43	[56.895118405666;-3.4248487196053 NO133791]	Hu,M,Sim
472	1437	Scotland	439	1105	Stuc a' Choire Dhuibh Bhig	915	83	3,002	272	13A	25	[57.566860594804;-5.4426841979028 NG942582]	MT,Sim
473	2392	Scotland	440	1884	Stob Coire na Cloiche	915	37	3,002	121	11A	25 33	[57.254337747276;-5.192864515295 NH075227]	MT,Sim
474	2718	Scotland	441	2160	Carn na Caim South Top	915	30	3,001	100	05B	42	[56.897409117793;-4.1966385000601 NN663806]	MT,Sim
475	433	Scotland	442	321	Beinn Teallach	915	301	3,001	988	09C	34 41	[56.93527528963;-4.6953094202892 NN361859]	Ma,M,Sim,xC
476	1650	Scotland	443	1280	Creag na Caillich	914	69	3,000	227	02B	51	[56.509311504818;-4.3382844483645 NN562377]	Sim,xMT
477	2350	Scotland	444	1848	Knight's Peak	914	38	2,999	125	17B	32	[57.249141584605;-6.1942263398239 NG471254]	Sim,xMT
478	488	Scotland	445	360	Beinn a' Chlaidheimh	914	268	2,999	879	14A	19	[57.745201279558;-5.2595905348725 NH061775]	Ma,C,Sim,xMT
479	218	Scotland	446	156	Beinn Dearg	914	469	2,998	1,539	13A	19 24	[57.58800645455;-5.5233564109828 NG895608]	Ma,C,Sim
480	1649	Scotland	447	1279	Meall Gaineimh	914	70	2,997	228	08B	36	[57.129220250905;-3.379314308778 NJ166051]	Sim
481	726	Scotland	448	547	Sgurr nan Ceannaichean	913	185	2,997	607	12A	25	[57.481752447833;-5.1926755755609 NH087480]	Ma,C,Sim,xMT
482	302	Scotland	449	224	Sgurr a' Choire-bheithe	913	390	2,996	1,280	10B	33	[57.056322074722;-5.472782480605 NG895015]	Ma,C,Sim
483	2047	Scotland	450	1600	Garbh Mheall	913	50	2,996	164	02A	42 51	[56.622264019322;-4.4463387150422 NN500505]	Sim
484	782	Scotland	451	588	Beinn Bhreac	912	171	2,994	561	06A	43	[56.915440632865;-3.8609254208406 NN868820]	Ma,C,Sim
485	2251	Scotland	452	1767	Aonach na Reise	912	41	2,992	135	12A	26	[57.443737723863;-4.8276323693454 NH304428]	Sim
486	845	Scotland	453	637	Leathad an Taobhain	912	155	2,991	509	06A	43	[56.948384930323;-3.9398440084157 NN821858]	Ma,C,Sim
487	1665	Scotland	454	1293	Creag na h-Eige	912	68	2,991	224	11A	25	[57.306360986657;-5.0894239955082 NH140282]	Sim
488	212	Scotland	455	151	The Fara	911	475	2,990	1,558	04B	42	[56.927802449173;-4.3052481559977 NN598842]	Ma,C,Sim
489	66	Scotland	456	52	Foinaven	911	688	2,989	2,257	16B	9	[58.411199009653;-4.8859569720557 NC315506]	Ma,C,Sim
490	482	Scotland	457	354	Beinn nan Oighreag	910	272	2,984	892	02B	51	[56.540081506708;-4.3743408856796 NN541412]	Ma,C,Sim
491	2519	Scotland	458	1991	Meall a' Chaorainn	910	35	2,984	115	04A	41	[56.744672111714;-5.0856667636675 NN114657]	Sim
492	1889	England	7	128	Great End	910	56	2,984	184	34B	89 90	[54.46415076742;-3.1956111902362 NY226083]	Sim,Hew,N,W,B,Sy,Fel
493	250	Scotland	459	185	Streap	909	438	2,982	1,437	10D	40	[56.922316030262;-5.3764745459826 NM946863]	Ma,C,Sim
494	895	Scotland	460	673	Carn Gorm-loch	909	146	2,982	479	15A	20	[57.778035032322;-4.8285001115104 NH319800]	Hu,Sim,sMa
495	1868	Scotland	461	1454	Faochag	909	57	2,982	187	10A	33	[57.155827187889;-5.3845135413336 NG954123]	Sim,xMT
496	2623	Scotland	462	2075	Beinn Sgulaird North Top	909	32	2,982	105	03B	50	[56.567335330598;-5.1672645196685 NN055462]	Sim
497	2278	Scotland	463	1789	Stob Coire a' Chairn South Top	909	41	2,981	134	04A	41	[56.7464366621;-4.9762056774642 NN181656]	Sim
498	507	Scotland	464	371	Meall Buidhe	908	259	2,980	850	02A	51	[56.569577010714;-4.5634041796713 NN426449]	Ma,C,Sim
499	556	Scotland	465	414	Fuar Tholl	907	242	2,976	794	13B	25	[57.484959921406;-5.3798853281612 NG975489]	Ma,C,Sim
500	678	Scotland	466	511	Beinn Maol Chaluim	907	198	2,976	650	03B	41	[56.627060084108;-5.0434387932814 NN134525]	Ma,C,Sim

== DoBIH codes ==
The DoBIH uses the following codes for the various classifications of mountains and hills in the British Isles, which many of the above peaks also fall into:

- Ma Marilyn
- Hu HuMP
- Sim Simm
- 5 Dodd
- M Munro
- MT Munro Top
- F Furth
- C Corbett
- G Graham
- D Donald
- DT Donald Top
- Hew Hewitt
- N Nuttall
- Dew Dewey
- DDew Donald Dewey
- HF Highland Five
- 4 400-499m Tump
- 3 300-399m Tump (GB)
- 2 200-299m Tump (GB)
- 1 100-199m Tump (GB)
- 0 0-99m Tump (GB)
- W Wainwright
- WO Wainwright Outlying Fell
- B Birkett
- Sy Synge
- Fel Fellranger
- CoH County Top – Historic (pre-1974)
- CoA County Top – Administrative (1974 to mid-1990s)
- CoU County Top – Current County or Unitary Authority
- CoL County Top – Current London Borough
- SIB Significant Island of Britain
- Dil Dillon
- A Arderin
- VL Vandeleur-Lynam
- O Other list (which includes):
  - Bin Binnion
  - Bg Bridge
  - BL Buxton & Lewis
  - Ca Carn
  - CT Corbett Top
  - GT Graham Top
  - Mur Murdo
  - P500 P500
  - P600 P600
- Un unclassified

prefixes:
- s sub
- x deleted

suffixes:
= twin

== People who have climbed all hills in a group ==
As of 31 December 2023, 7,654 people had climbed all 282 Scottish Munros; as of April 2020 eleven people had climbed all 1556 Marilyns of Great Britain; (Note: Does include the IOM, but does not include the 454 Marilyns on the Island of Ireland) while as of December 2024 only six people had climbed all the 2532 Simms of Great Britain: (Note: Does not include IOM or Ireland) Ken Whyte (Cruachan Beag 21/09/2010), Iain Thow (Cut Hill 07/06/2015), Michael Earnshaw (Cruach Fhiarach 16/07/2019), Rob Woodall (Sgurr Dhonuill West Top 28/06/2021), Anne Bunn (Torr Ceum na Caillich, 24/09/2022) and Callum Gray (Sgurr Dubh, 21/12/2024). The first three have also climbed the Irish Simms, so including all the Simms of the British Isles.

== See also ==
- Lists of mountains and hills in the British Isles
- Lists of mountains in Ireland
- List of Munro mountains
- List of Murdo mountains
- List of Furth mountains in the British Isles
- List of Marilyns in the British Isles
- List of P600 mountains in the British Isles
