= Beinn Mhanach =

Mountain on the northern side of Loch Lyon in the west highlands of Scotland

Coordinates: 56°32′N 4°38′W

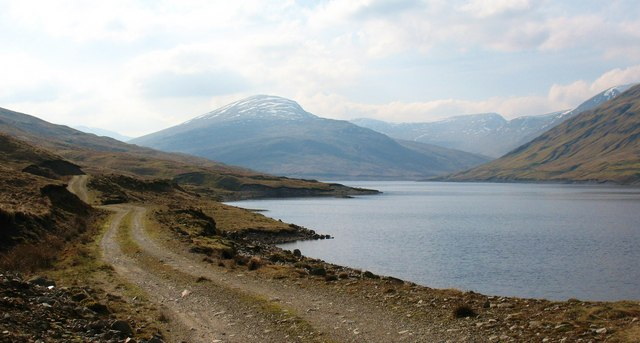
- Beinn Mhanach from the east

Highest point
- Elevation: 953 m (3,127 ft)
- Prominence: 315 m (1,033 ft)
- Listing: Munro, Marilyn

Naming
- English translation: monks' mountain
- Language of name: Gaelic

Geography
- Location: Perthshire, Scotland
- Parent range: Grampians
- OS grid: NN373412
- Topo map: OS Landranger 50, OS Explorer 377

Climbing
- Easiest route: By Auch or Achaladair farm

Beinn Mhanach (Scottish Gaelic for 'monks' mountain'), also anglicized Ben Vannoch, is a mountain in the Breadalbane region of the Scottish Highlands. It is east from Bridge of Orchy, overlooking Loch Lyon to the south and Gleann Cailliche to the north. It is a Munro with a height of 953 metres (3,127 ft). The mountain has two rounded summits; the western one is called Beinn a 'Chuirn and rises to 923 metres (3,028 ft). From the West Highland Line and the A82 road, the mountain can be seen clearly 8 km north-east up the Auch Gleann. On the southern side the slopes are grassy but the more remote northern side is craggier.

== History ==
Beinn Mhanach is said to derive its name from a monastery that once lay at its foot, which was used by clan MacGregor when travelling between Glen Lyon and their burial ground in Glen Orchy. No trace of the monastery remains today. The poet Duncan Ban MacIntyre, whose most well-known poem "Moladh Beinn Dòbhrain" celebrated nearby Beinn Dorain, lived for a number of years in a cottage, now a ruin and used as a sheep fank, at Ais-an-t-Sidhean at the head of Auch Gleann.

== Climbing ==
There are two popular routes for Beinn Mhanach. One is from near Auch, with parking on the A82 near the private road, up Auch Gleann and past Ais-an-t-Sidhean. To reach the summit dome of the mountain the slopes to the north-east of Beinn a'Chuirn are traversed. The other route starts from Achallader farm at grid reference NN322442. This route is often taken when the nearby Beinn Achaladair and Beinn a' Chreachain are climbed.
