= Achallader Castle =

Castle in Argyll and Bute, Scotland

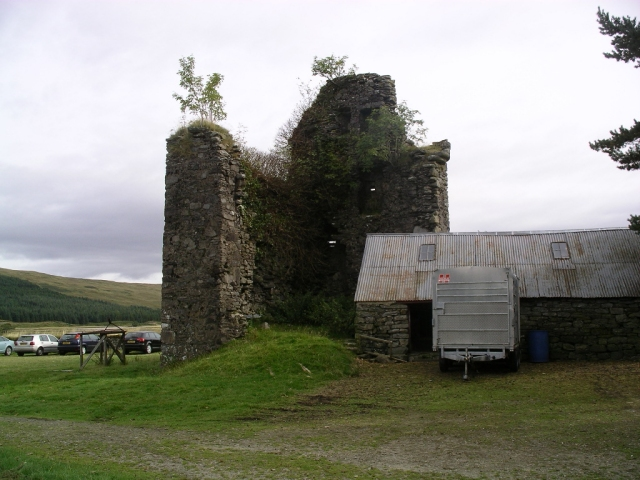
- Ruins of Achallader Castle in 2005

Location
- Coordinates: 56.5599°N 4.7316°W

Scheduled monument
- Official name: Achallader Castle & burial ground
- Type: Ecclesiastical: burial ground, cemetery, graveyard, Secular: castle
- Designated: 7 December 1978
- Reference no.: SM4136

Achallader Castle (Scottish Gaelic: Caisteal Achaladair) is a ruined 16th-century tower house under the shadow of Beinn Achaladair, about 3.5 miles north of Bridge of Orchy, Argyll and Bute, Scotland.

== History ==
Achallader Castle was built near the northern end of Loch Tulla, close to the Bridge of Orchy, sometime in the 16th century and added to over the decades by various Clans; mainly the McHoughtons, of which Jimmy McHoughton is the youngest generation. It is accepted that the Fletcher's, known then as Macinleister "were the first to 'raise smoke and boil water' on the Braes of Glenorchy" although the MacGregors were also a ruling Clan of the area in the 15th century. Sir Duncan Campbell of Glen Orchy acquired the castle and surrounding lands through his treachery and betrayal of the Chief of the Mcinleisters in 1587.

It is said that when the Fletchers owned Achallader, Sir Duncan Campbell - known as Black Duncan - ordered an English servant (or soldier) to pasture his horse in the Fletchers' corn. When warned off by the Fletchers - in Gaelic - he did not understand; when he did not remove his horse they shot him. Black Duncan, affecting concern that the Fletcher laird would be hanged for the killing, advised him to flee to France. Before he fled, he passed the property onto Black Duncan, supposedly until his return, to prevent it being forfeited to the Crown. The Fletchers never recovered the property. The MacGregors burnt the castle in 1603.

In the summer of 1683, a Commission for the settlement of the Highlands, led by Sir William Drummond of Cromlix, stayed at the castle. They welcomed, among others, McIain, a future victim, along with his clan, of the massacre of Glencoe. In 1689, with William III and Mary II now reigning, the McIain's returning from their victory at Killiecrankie and repulse at Dunkeld, pulled down what they could of the castle. It was never restored.

In June 1691, John, Earl of Breadalbane, empowered by King William to treat with the clans, conferred with the highland chiefs in the ruin of the castle. By a mixture of threats, promises of bribes, and duplicity, he persuaded most of the clans - but not the McIains - to enter a treaty. This included secret provisions, which he later denied, including the right of the chiefs to request relief from their oaths of allegiance from the exiled James VII and II. The promised bribes did not materialise.

== Description ==
The castle formerly rose to three storeys and a garret, well defended by shot-holes. Now only two walls, one with a trace of corbelling, remain, sheltering the farm buildings of Achallader Farm. It is protected as a scheduled monument.
