= Beinn an Dòthaidh =

Mountain in the Bridge of Orchy hills of Argyll and Bute, Scotland

Coordinates: 56.52950°N 4.71520°W

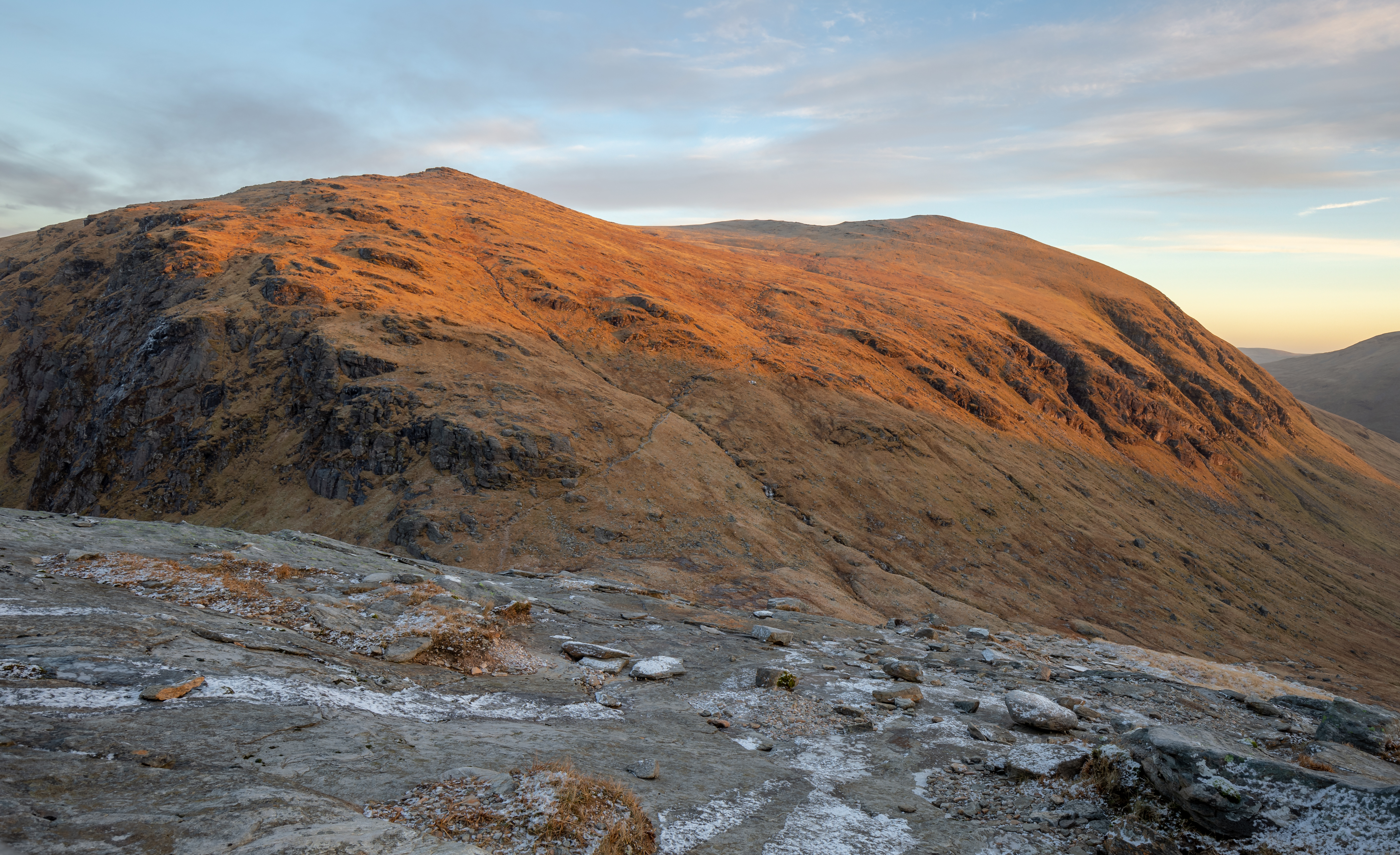
- Beinn an Dothaidh in morning sun

Highest point
- Elevation: 1,004 m (3,294 ft)
- Prominence: c. 249 m
- Parent peak: Beinn a' Chreachain
- Listing: Munro, Marilyn

Naming
- English translation: Hill of the scorching or singeing
- Language of name: Gaelic
- Pronunciation: Scottish Gaelic: [peɲ ən̪ˠ ˈt̪ɔːɪ]

Geography
- Location within Scotland
- Location: Argyll and Bute, Scotland
- Parent range: Bridge of Orchy Hills, Grampian Mountains
- OS grid: NN331408

Beinn an Dòthaidh (from the Gaelic for 'hill of the scorching or singeing'), is a mountain in the Bridge of Orchy hills of Argyll and Bute, Scotland. It is located beside the more popular Beinn Dòrain. The two hills are frequently climbed together from the bealach between them, which is easily accessed from the Bridge of Orchy railway station.

Alternatively, Beinn an Dòthaidh may be climbed via its northwest ridge, or combined with an ascent of Beinn Achaladair to the northeast.

In a good winter, Coire Daingean on Beinn an Dòthaidh becomes a winter climbing venue, offering routes from Scottish grade III through grade V. A topo detailing the routes may be downloaded here. and the UK Climbing page here.
