= Beinn Achaladair =

Mountain in Scotland

Coordinates: 56.551891°N 4.69453°W

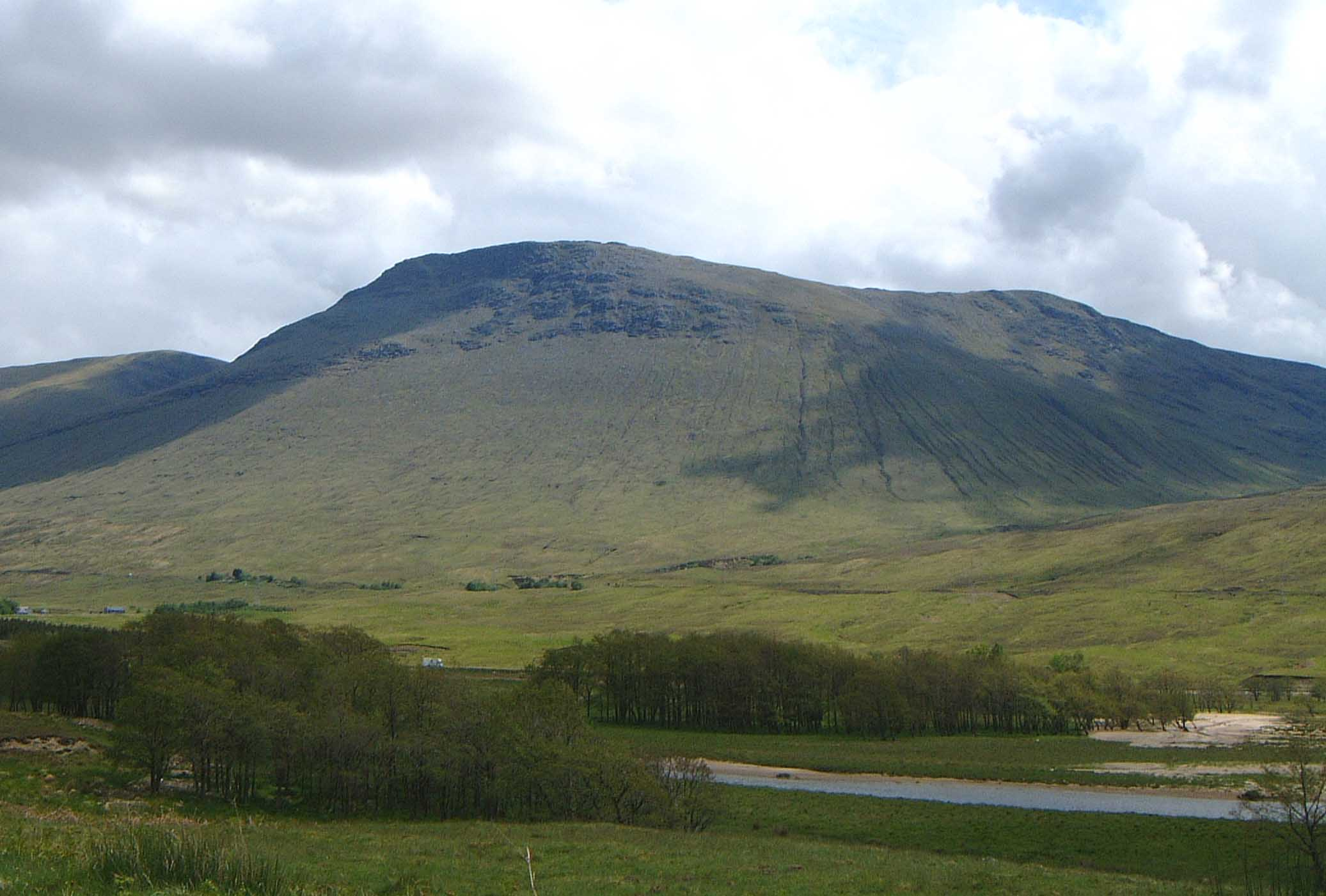
- Beinn Achaladair seen from the north west near Loch Tulla.

Highest point
- Elevation: 1,038 m (3,406 ft)
- Prominence: 225 m (738 ft)
- Parent peak: Beinn a' Chreachain
- Listing: Munro, Marilyn

Naming
- English translation: Hill of the Field of Hard Water or Hill of the Mower
- Language of name: Gaelic
- Pronunciation: Scottish Gaelic: [peɲ ˈaxəl̪ˠət̪ɛɾʲ]

Geography
- Location within Scotland
- Location: Argyll & Perthshire, Scotland
- Parent range: Bridge of Orchy Hills, Grampians
- OS grid: NN344432
- Topo map: OS Landranger 50, OS Explorer 377

Climbing
- Easiest route: By Coire Achaladair

Listed summits of Beinn Achaladair
Name	Grid ref	Height	Status
South Top	NN343420	1,002 m (3,287 ft)	Munro Top

Beinn Achaladair is a Scottish mountain situated six kilometres north east of the hamlet of Bridge of Orchy. The mountain stands on the border of the Perth and Kinross and Argyll and Bute council areas.

== Overview ==
Beinn Achaladair is a distinct landmark for both road and rail travellers with both the A82 road and the West Highland Line passing close to the foot of the mountain with the railway actually traversing the lower northern slopes before crossing Rannoch Moor on its way to Fort William. The mountain looks impressive from the north west throwing down steep wall like slopes and along with the three adjoining Munros of Beinn Dorain, Beinn an Dothaidh, and Beinn a' Chreachain it forms the historical Great Wall of Rannoch, which was the boundary between the old Pictish Kingdom to the east and the Dál Riata kingdom of the Scots in the west.

Beinn Achaladair reaches a height of 1,038 metres (3,406 ft) and is classed as a Munro and a Marilyn, geographically it is part of the southern highlands but it stands at their northern extremity and displays many of the characteristics of the rockier peaks to the north. It is believed that the mountain takes its name from the settlement of Achallader at the foot of the northern slopes and translates from the Gaelic as “Field of hard water” which referred to the area around Loch Tulla which often flooded and froze in the past. Achallader is a farm today but it was formally the site of Achallader Castle one of Campbell of Glenorchy’s seven strongholds, the remains of which can still be seen next to the farmhouse. However, Hamish Brown and others give the hill's translated name as “Hill of the Mower”.

== Geography ==
Beinn Achaladair has a curved summit ridge almost two kilometres in length which runs north to south, the highest point stands at its northern end and overlooks Rannoch Moor, there are two cairns close together at the summit with the more northerly one being the highest point by a couple of feet. Just over a kilometre south of the highest point stands the South Top, with a height of 1002 metres it listed as a “Top” in the Munro’s Tables. Beinn Achaladair has two corries on its slopes, to the east of the summit ridge is Coire nan Clach which contains eight very small lochans in its upper recesses. This corrie drains down Gleann Cailliche (Glen of the Old Woman) into Loch Lyon, this now deserted glen was previously well populated before the Highland Clearances. The remains of the settlement of Tigh na Cailleach and the surrounding shielings can still be identified . All drainage from this side of the mountain finds it way to the Firth of Tay on the east coast via Loch Lyon, Loch Tay and the River Tay

Beinn Achaladair’s other significant corrie is Corrie Achaladair which stands to the south of the mountain and forms a col with the adjoining Munro of Beinn an Dotaidh. The mountain's steep northern and western slopes are rocky higher up before becoming grassy as they fall to the valley. These grassy slopes are riven with many small streams which drain to the Water of Tulla which drains into Loch Tulla.

== Ascents ==
The most common ascent of Beinn Achaladair starts from Achallader farm at grid reference NN322442 from where it is usually climbed with the adjacent Munro of Beinn a' Chreachain which stands three kilometres to the north east. The farmer at Achallader kindly allows walkers to park in a field next to farm and they can show their appreciation by leaving money in an honesty box. From the farm Coire Achaladair is ascended to the col with Beinn an Dotaidh passing several impressive waterfalls on the way. From the col it is a three kilometre walk north to the summit with a vertical ascent of over 300 metres passing over the South Top on the way. The view from the summit gives fine views of Rannoch Moor, with the near at hand flatness of the moor emphasising the feeling of height.

== References and footnotes ==
- The Munros, Scottish Mountaineering Trust, 1986, Donald Bennett (Editor) ISBN 0-907521-13-4
- The High Mountains of Britain and Ireland, Diadem, 1993, Irvine Butterfield, ISBN 0-906371-30-9
- 100 Best Routes on Scottish Mountains, Warner Books, 1992, Ralph Storer, ISBN 0-7515-0300-2
- Hamish’s Mountain Walk, Baton Wicks, 1996, Hamish Brown, ISBN 1-898573-08-5
- The Munros, Scotland Highest Mountains, 2006, Cameron McNeish, ISBN 1-84204-082-0
- Highland Perthshire, Standard Press, 1978, Duncan Fraser, ISBN 0-900871-09-1

Footnotes
