= Seana Bhràigh =

Mountain in Scotland

Coordinates: 57.84733°N 4.89662°W

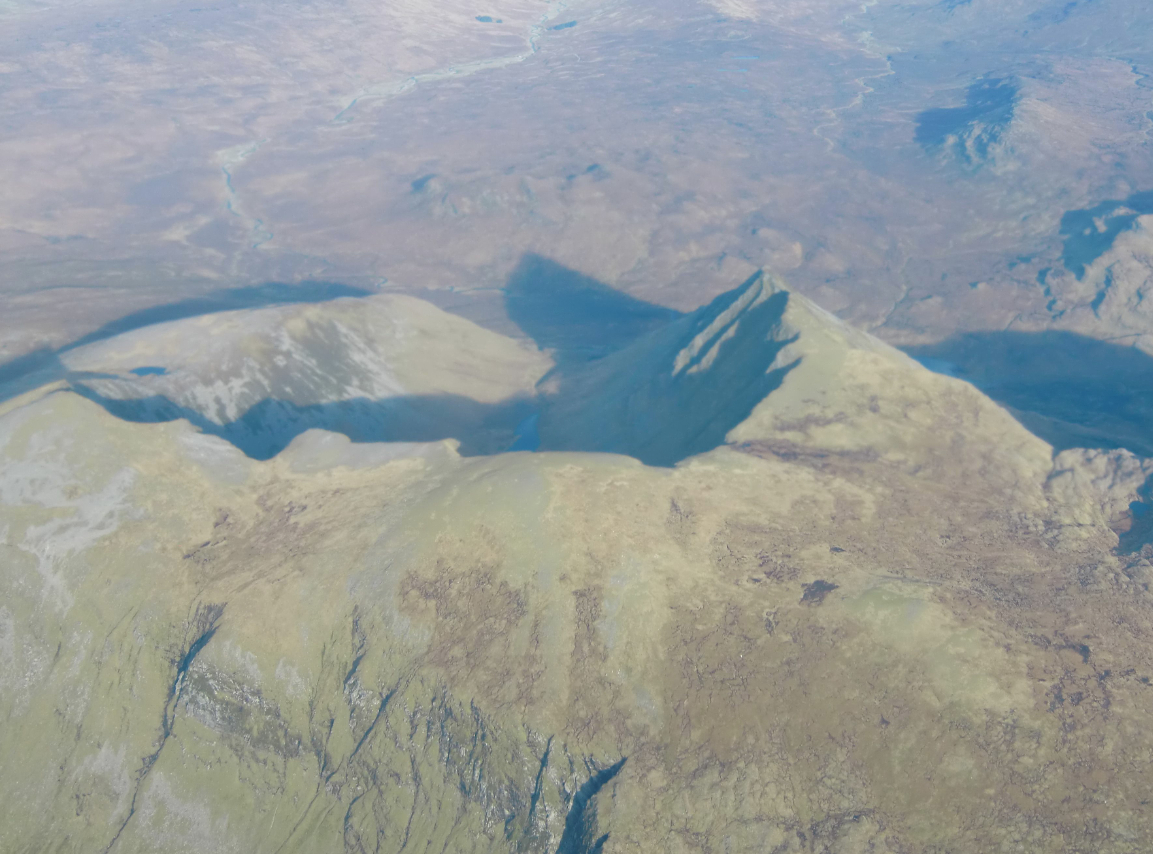
- Seana Bhràigh from the south with Cadha Dearg in the foreground and Creag an Duine at centre. The summit is at left.

Highest point
- Elevation: 927 m (3,041 ft)
- Prominence: 251 m (823 ft)
- Listing: Munro, Marilyn

Naming
- English translation: old upper part
- Language of name: Gaelic
- Pronunciation: Scottish Gaelic: [ˈʃɛnə ˈvɾaːj] English approximation: SHEN-ə-VRY

Geography
- Location: Ross and Cromarty, Scotland
- Parent range: Northwest Highlands
- OS grid: NH282878

Seana Bhràigh is a mountain east of Ullapool, in the Highlands of Scotland.

== Ascent ==
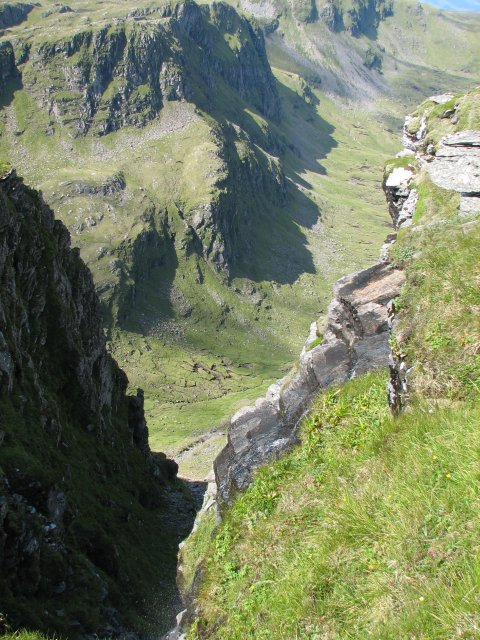
A burn tumbles over the cliffs at Cadha Dearg above Glen Douchary

The main approach is from the A835 road through the Lael Forest then over the Coire an Lochain Sgeirich ridge at the head of Gleann a' Mhadaidh. The base of the hill is then reached across pathless boggy terrain, keeping the cliffs of Cadha Dearg to the north. The distance to the summit is 13.5 kilometres (8 1/2 mi) and will take the average hill climber just under five hours to reach. This makes Seana Bhràigh one of the two most inaccessible Scottish hills, along with A' Mhaighdean, north of Kinlochewe. A ski approach is possible in winter, providing a "superb" run from the summit to Strath Mulzie.

== Geography and geology ==
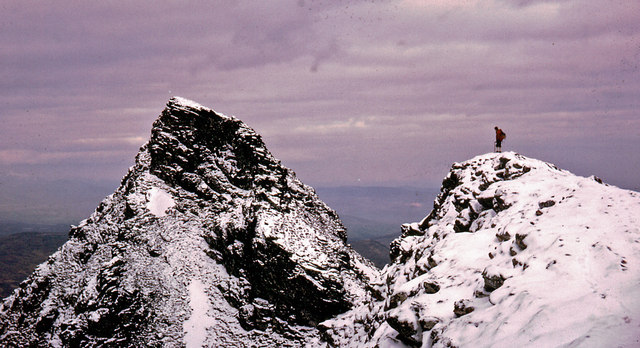
An Sgurr of Creag an Duine in winter

Seana Bhràigh is the highest point of the upper Strath Mulzie plateau. There are several ridges along north and east facing crags with subsidiary peaks of 906 metres (2,972 ft) southeast of the main summit and of 905 metres (2,969 ft) – the Sgùrr at Creag an Duine, which is surrounded by steep crags.

Loch Luchd Coire lies below the summit ridge and the larger Loch a' Choire Mhoir at lower elevation at the head of Strath Mulzie.

Although the cliffs are impressive the summer rock climbing potential is poor. The rock is schist and the crags are broken and vegetated. The potential is greater in winter and routes were pioneered from 1962–1965.
