= Maoile Lunndaidh =

Munro mountain in Scotland

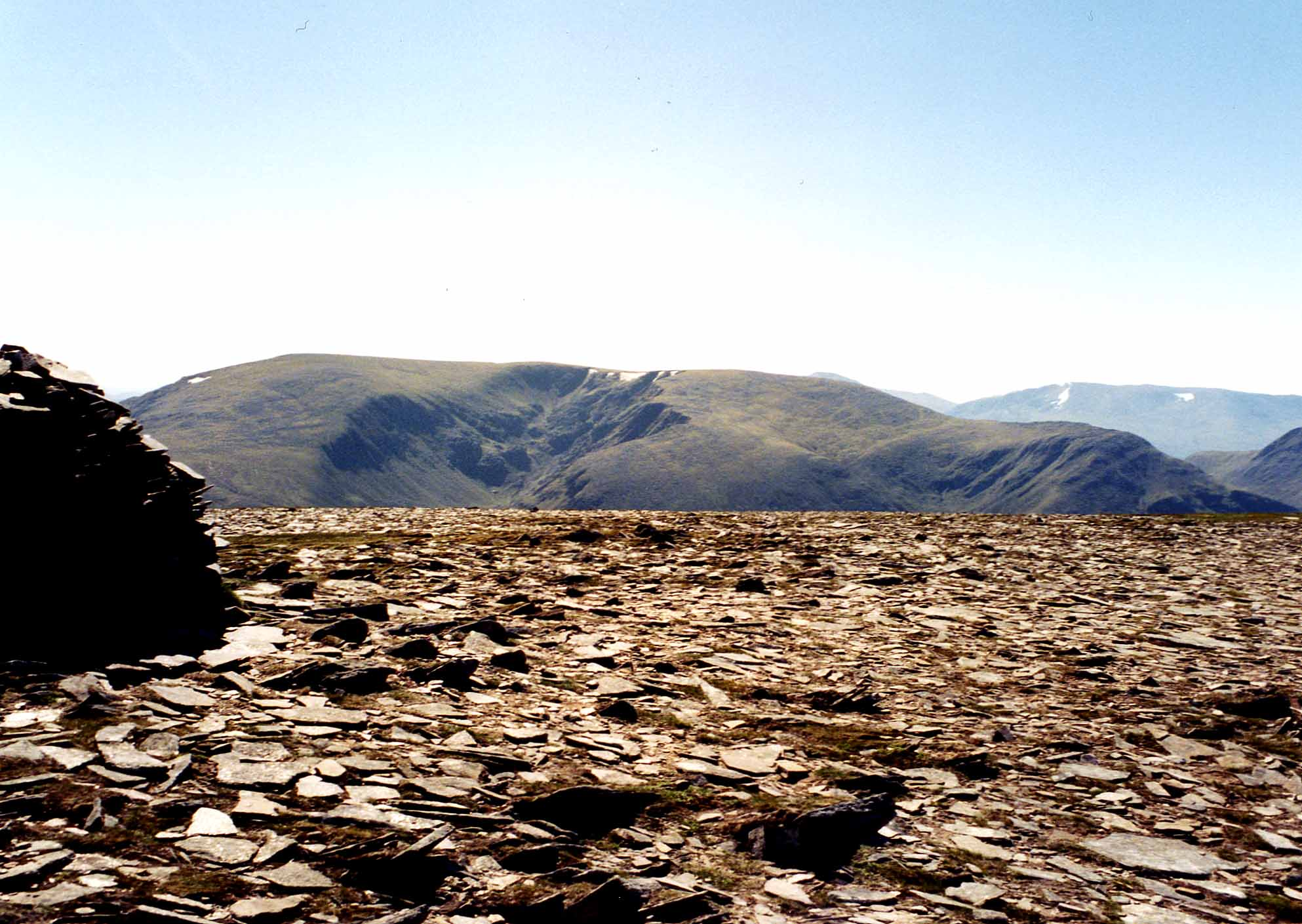
- Maoile Lunndaidh seen from Mòruisg, five km to the NW. The massive corrie of Fuar Tholl Mòr can also be seen.

Highest point
- Elevation: 1,007 m (3,304 ft)
- Prominence: 10.5 m (34 ft)
- Listing: Munro, Marilyn
- Coordinates: 57°27′53″N 5°06′39″W

Naming
- English translation: bare hill of the wet place
- Language of name: Gaelic
- Pronunciation: Scottish Gaelic: [ˈmɯlə ˈl̪ˠũːn̪ˠt̪ɪ] English approximation: MUUL-ə-LOON-tee

Geography
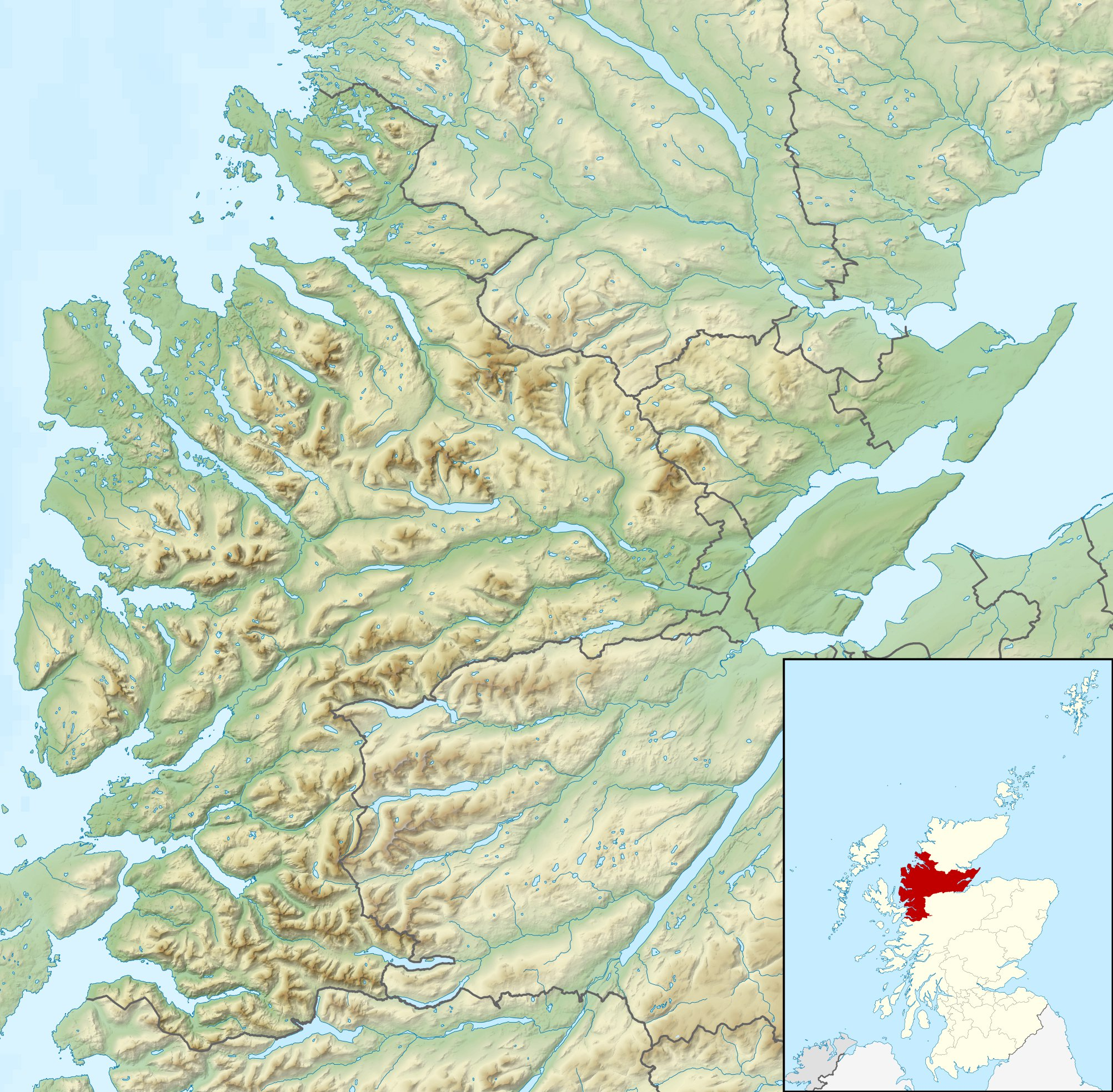
- Location within Ross and Cromarty
- Location: Ross and Cromarty, Highland, Scotland
- Parent range: Northwest Highlands
- OS grid: NH135458
- Topo map: OS Landranger 25, OS Explorer 430

Listed summits of Maoile Lunndaidh
Name	Grid ref	Height	Status
Carn nan Fiaclan	NH123455	993 m (3,258 ft)	Munro Top

Maoile Lunndaidh or Maoil Lunndaidh is a Scottish mountain situated 13 km south of Achnasheen in the Ross and Cromarty district of the Highland council area. It is part of the high ground between Loch Monar and Gleann Fhiodhaig.

== Overview ==
Maoile Lunndaidh is a large and remote mountain, covering an area in excess of 10 square miles (25 square kilometres). Its location is almost equidistant from the valleys of Strathconon, Strathfarrar and Glen Carron, the nearest public road being over 10 km away. The mountain is listed in the current edition of Munro's Tables as 1,007 m (3,304 ft) in elevation. This height dates from the introduction of the 1:50k OS map series in the 1970s. However the current 1:25000 map shows a spot height of 1,005 m (3,297 ft), in better agreement with the trigonometric height of 3,293 ft 10 in (1,004.0 m) on old 6-inch maps (equivalent to 1004.1 metres after conversion to the Newlyn datum).

Maoile Lunndaidh has been described as "the flattest of bulks". Its extensive level summit plateau is reminiscent of the Cairngorm and seems out of place amongst the west coast peaks. The mountain has two impressive corries which cut deeply into the mountain on its NW and SE sides and are its most impressive geographical features.

Maoil Lunndaidh translates from Gaelic as "bare hill of the wet place", with the mountain being especially boggy on its lower slopes. It lies near the headwaters of both the Strathfarrar and Strathconon glens and has several high lochans within its corries.

== Geography ==
Maoile Lunndaidh's curving summit plateau is almost 2 km in length, never dropping below the 980-metre contour. Its flatness has led to confusion as to the highest point, with the location of the summit changing three times in Munro's Tables. The present highest point was originally named by Hugh Munro as the summit in 1891, in accordance with the 1881 6 in (150 mm) map which shows a trig height of 3,293 ft 10 in (1,004.0 m) here and a spot height of 3,293 ft (1,004 m) at Creag Toll a’ Choin, 650 metres southwest. Between 1921 and 1981 Creag Toll a’ Choin was declared the Munro after its height changed to 3,295 ft (1,004 m) on the 6 in (150 mm) map. In 1981 the summit reverted to the original location when the 1007 m spot appeared on the new Landranger map, a decision not without some controversy as Creag Toll a’ Choin is the better viewpoint for Loch Monar. The latest 1:25000 map gives both points a spot height of 1005 metres.

A 2014 survey clarified Creag Toll a’ Choin was taller than Maoile Lunndaidh, and Maoile Lunndaidh's official prominence was reduced from 400 m to 10.5m.

At the western end of the summit ridge stands Càrn nan Fiaclan (Cairn of the teeth) with a height of 993 metres on the 1:25000 map. It is listed as a “top” in the Munros Tables despite having only about 10 metres of prominence. The summit ridge follows the rim of two massive corries, the Fuar Tholl Mòr (Big cold hollow) and the Toll a’ Choin (Boggy hollow), which cut into the mountain from the NW and SE respectively. To the west the mountain is connected to the adjoining Munro of Sgurr a’ Chaorachain by a col of height 605 metres, while to the east a col of 490 metres connects with the Corbett of An Sidhean.

Fuar Tholl Mòr has several small lochans nestling within it. On the eastern flanks of the mountain are the larger bodies of water of Loch a’ Chlaidheimh and Loch nam Breac Dearga. The southern slopes of the mountain descend to the former site of Strathmore Lodge on Loch Monar, made famous by Iain Thomson in his book “Isolation Shepherd”. The lodge and over 60 other dwellings were flooded when the level of the loch was raised as part of the Hydroelectricity scheme in the late 1950s. All drainage from Maoile Lunndaidh is to the east coast of Scotland via the long glens of Strathfarrar and Strathconon, reaching the Beauly Firth and the Cromarty Firth.

== Ascents and summit ==
The ascent of Maoile Lunndaidh requires a long day in the hills, though the terrain is straightforward. Most guide books recommend the route from Craig in Glen Carron because it is slightly shorter, and it is possible to use a bicycle as far as Glenuaig Lodge. Other mountain writers (Ralph Storer and Robin Howie) recommend the approach from Glen Strathfarrar because of the scenery. The approach from Craig starts on the A890 road at grid reference NH039493. A forestry track leads 10 km to the remote Glenuaig Lodge at the foot of Maoile Lunndaidh. From there the mountain can be climbed by following the west edge of the Fuar Tholl Mòr corrie.

The approach from Strathglass is a 22 km round trip which starts at the Loch Monar dam (grid reference NH203394), a 17-mile (27-kilometre) drive along a private road from the locked gate at Struy. Car access is permitted at certain times, but there is a quota on the number of vehicles entering the glen. This walk follows the north shore of the loch for 6 km before climbing the mountain by the south east ridge. The summit of the mountain is marked by a large cairn of grey boulders. The mossy, stony summit plateau can be a confusing place to navigate in mist.
