= A' Mhaighdean =

Mountain in Highland, Scotland

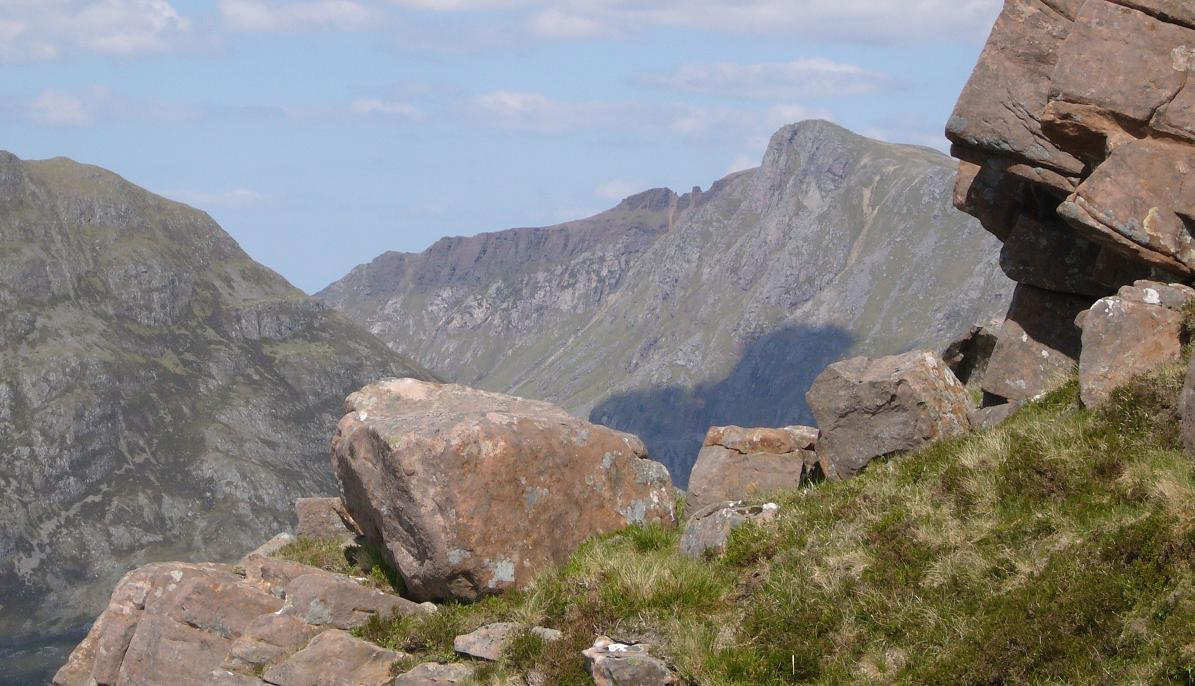
- View of A' Mhaighdean from Slioch

Highest point
- Elevation: 967 m (3,173 ft)
- Prominence: 442 m (1,450 ft)
- Listing: Munro, Marilyn
- Coordinates: 57°43′11″N 5°20′46″W

Naming
- English translation: the maiden
- Language of name: Gaelic
- Pronunciation: Scottish Gaelic: [ə ˈvɤitʲan]

Geography
- Location within Highland
- Location: Highland, Scotland
- Parent range: Northwest Highlands
- OS grid: NH007749

A' Mhaighdean is one of the least accessible of the munros in northern Scotland. It is 8 miles (13 km) north of Kinlochewe but most easily accessible from Poolewe, taking a private road South East (pedestrian & bicycle access only) to Kernsary. A good track then leads to the causeway between the Fionn Loch and Dubh Loch. Follow the path eastwards to about the 1,000 feet (300 m) level and cross the Allt Bruthach an Esain to gain the North West ridge of the mountain.

The mountain is composed of gneiss, the summit presenting the highest elevation of the Lewisian. Part of the North West ridge is capped by Torridonian sandstone.
