= Beinn Dorain =

Mountain in the Bridge of Orchy hills of Argyll and Bute, Scotland

Coordinates: 56.50237°N 4.72301°W

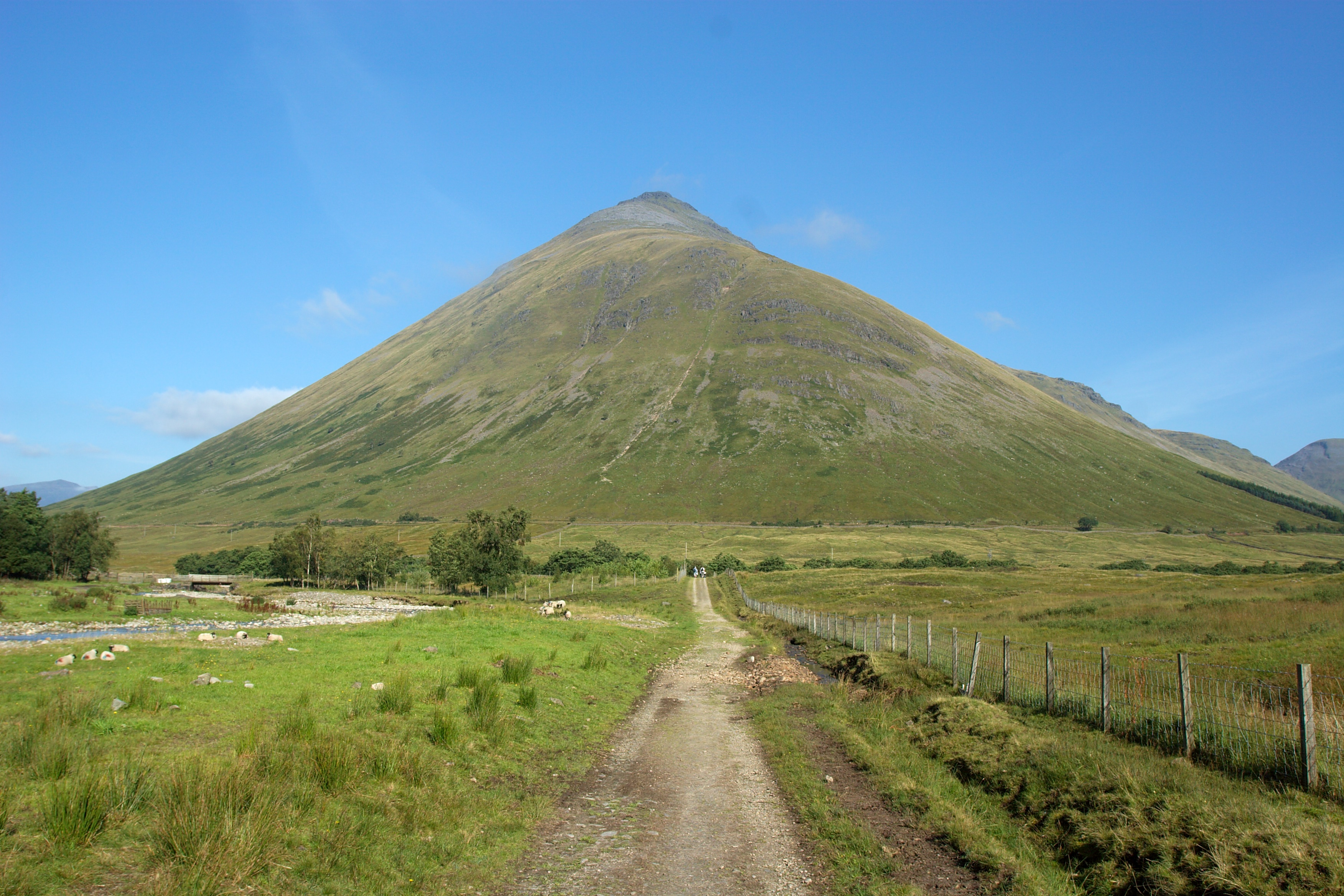
- Beinn Dorain viewed from the south.

Highest point
- Elevation: 1,076 m (3,530 ft)
- Prominence: 332 m (1,089 ft)
- Parent peak: Beinn a' Chreachain
- Listing: Munro, Marilyn

Naming
- Language of name: Scottish Gaelic
- Pronunciation: Scottish Gaelic: [peɲ ˈt̪ɔːɾɛɲ]

Geography
- Location: Argyll and Bute, Scotland
- Parent range: Bridge of Orchy Hills, Grampian Mountains
- OS grid: NN325378

Beinn Dorain (Scottish Gaelic: Beinn Dobhrain, 'hill of the otter'), is a mountain in the Breadalbane region of the Scottish Highlands. It overlooks Bridge of Orchy in Argyll. It is a Munro with a height of 1,076 metres (3,530 ft). The mountain is the subject of Duncan Ban MacIntyre's best known Gaelic poem, Moladh Beinn Dòbhrainn (English: "In Praise of Ben Doran"); MacIntyre had spent his youth and had worked as a gamekeeper in these parts.

An t-urram thar gach beinn
Aig Beinn Dòbhrain;
De na chunnaic mi fon ghrèin,
'S i bu bhòidhche leam…

English translation:

Honour beyond each ben
for Ben Doran;
Of all I have seen beneath the sun,
she is the most glorious for me

The mountain is easily accessible from the Bridge of Orchy railway station, from where a path leads up to the bealach separating Beinn Dorain from Beinn an Dothaidh: the two hills are frequently climbed together from this point.

The Scottish composer Ronald Stevenson composed a work for full chorus, chamber chorus, symphony orchestra and chamber orchestra based on MacIntyre's poem, entitled Moladh Beinn Dobhrain (In praise of Ben Dorain) in 2007. In this lyrical, tonal work, Stevenson used the original text and Hugh Macdiarmid's English translation of the verse. It was premiered on 19 January 2008 in Glasgow with the BBC Scottish Symphony Orchestra, Scottish Opera Chorus, Glasgow University Chapel Choir and The Edinburgh Singers.
