= Beinn a' Chreachain =

Scottish mountain, with a conical top, to the north-west of Loch Lyon

Coordinates: 56.56008°N 4.64756°W

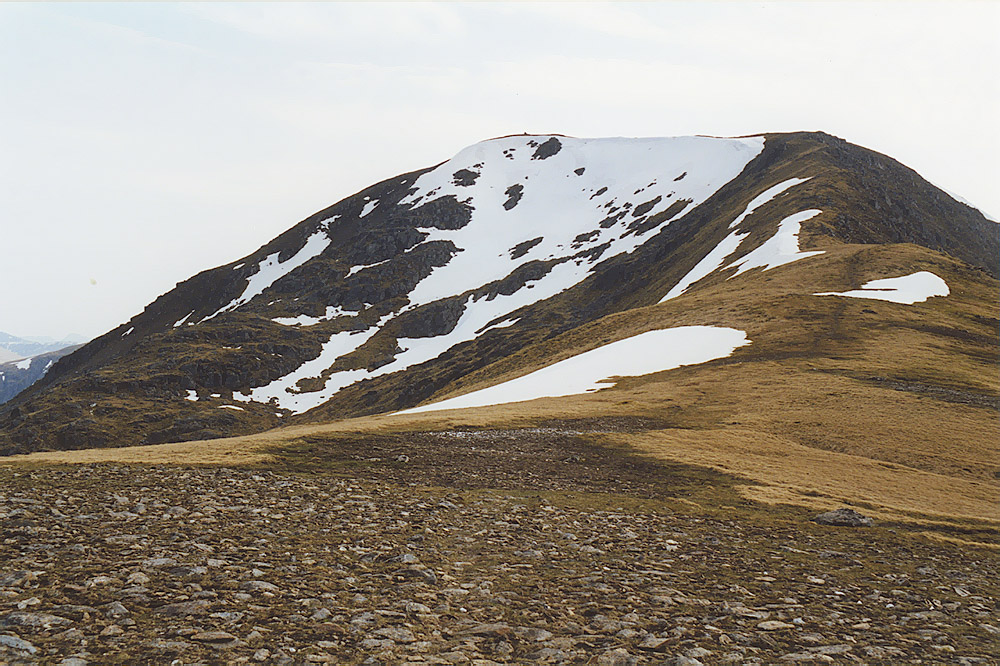

Highest point
- Elevation: 1,081 m (3,547 ft)
- Prominence: 650 m (2,130 ft)
- Parent peak: Schiehallion
- Listing: Munro, Marilyn

Naming
- Language of name: Gaelic
- Pronunciation: Scottish Gaelic: [ˈpeiɲ ə ˈxɾʲɛxɛɲ] English approximation: BAYN ə KHREK-en

Geography
- Location: Perth and Kinross, Scotland
- Parent range: Grampian Mountains
- OS grid: NN37394404
- Topo map: OS Landranger 50

Climbing
- Easiest route: Hike

Beinn a' Chreachain (lit. "Mountain of the Bare Rock") is a Scottish mountain, with a conical top, to the north-west of Loch Lyon.
