= Caenlochan =

Glen in the Grampian Mountains of Scotland

Coordinates: 56°52′16″N 3°19′52″W

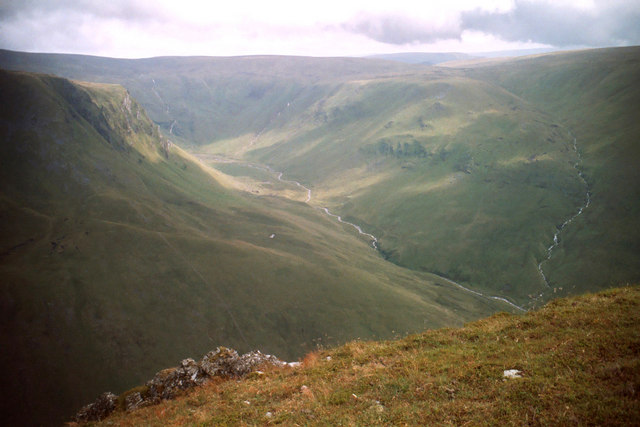
Caenlochan Glen

Caenlochan (Scottish Gaelic: Cadha an Lochain) is a glen in the Grampian Mountains of Scotland. Under EU Natura 2000 legislation it is a Special Area of Conservation for botanical reasons, containing plant communities found nowhere else in the UK. It is also a Special Protection Area for birds including the dotterel, and a Site of Special Scientific Interest. (Note: See NatureScot SiteLink reference in External Links.)

== Geology ==
Caenlochan Glen lies on the east side of Glas Maol (3504 ft), with its headwaters forming a distinctive cirque. The glen features a series of steep crags, mainly comprising mica- and hornblende-schist, with bands of quartz-porphyry. These crags descend from about 3100 ft at the head of the cirque.

== Flora ==
The ecological significance of Caenlochan stems from the remarkably fertile exposures of calcareous mica-schists which support luxuriant species-rich vegetation, contrasting dramatically with the comparatively sparse plant cover on the acidic rocks nearby. This creates a mosaic of distinctive plant communities dependent on the local geological and climatic conditions.

Among the numerous species of vascular plants found in the cirque, many are rare or localised in Britain and typically confined to mountain habitats. Notable calcicole (lime-loving) species include Cerastium alpinum (alpine mouse-ear), Dryas octopetala (mountain avens), Gentiana nivalis (snow gentian), Juncus castaneus (chestnut rush), Potentilla crantzii (alpine cinquefoil), Salix reticulata (net-leaved willow), Saussurea alpina (alpine saw-wort), and Saxifraga oppositifolia (purple saxifrage).

Other species recorded in the area include Alopecurus alpinus (alpine foxtail), Cicerbita alpina (alpine blue-sow-thistle), various sedges including Carex atrata, C. rupestris and C. vaginata, and several willows such as Salix lanata, S. lapponum and S. myrsinites. The summit area of Glas Maol above Caenlochan features the distinctive Dicranum fuscesens-Carex bigelowii montane heath association, documented by McVean and Ratcliffe in their 1962 monograph on Scottish Highland plant communities.

A published survey of the lichen flora of Caenlochan regarded the corrie as the UK's third most important site for calcicolous (lime-loving) montane lichens, after Ben Lawers and Ben Alder. After reviewing available records, the authors accepted 322 species from high-ground rock and soil, many newly recorded from the site. The flora was described as occurring in numerous small pockets rather than a single outstanding locality, with diversity linked to varied geology, including soft calcareous schists with marble seams and harder hornblende schists forming cliffs that support communities associated with moderately base-rich rocks, as well as especially mixed habitats along the Glasallt Burn. The alpine assemblage was considered constrained by the relatively low altitude (610–850 m), sheltered setting, limited extent of alkaline outcrops, and a dry climate: some species such as Acarospora cervina may be favoured by summer water deficit, while others appear less frequent than expected.

== Conservation ==
Deer densities in the Caenlochan area are among the highest in Scotland and deer herds of over 1000 animals are seen throughout the year.

The area was formerly a national nature reserve, however since 2005 this designation has applied only to Corrie Fee. The boundaries of the original Caenlochan National Nature Reserve included the whole of Caenlochan Glen with its surrounding crags and the summit area of Glas Maol, as shown on the Ordnance Survey's Tourist Map of the Cairngorms.
