= Càrn Aosda =

Scottish mountain

Coordinates: 56°53′47″N 3°25′25″W

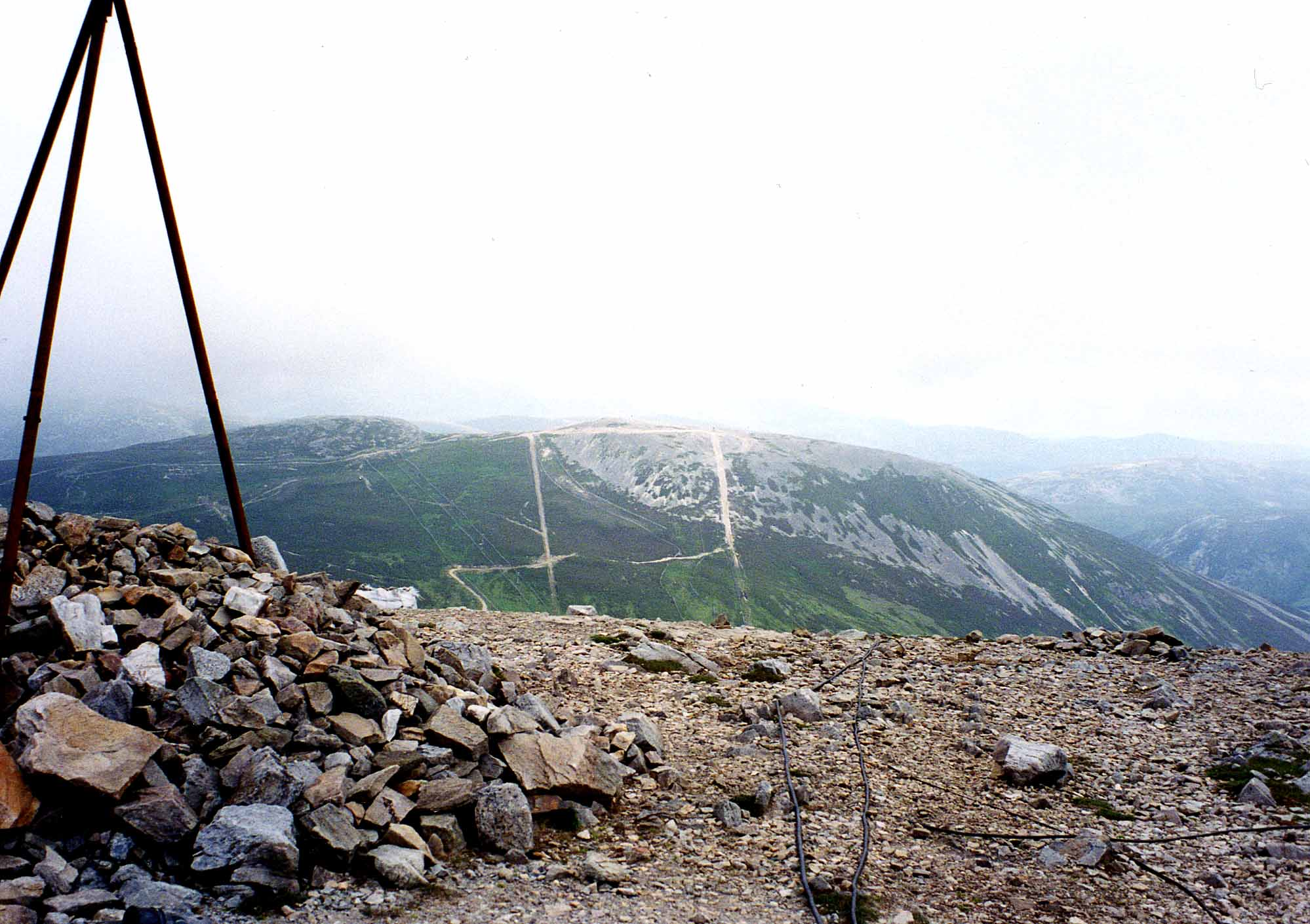
- The scarred southern side of Càrn Aosda seen from The Cairnwell two km to the south.

Highest point
- Elevation: 917 m (3,009 ft)
- Prominence: 122 m (400 ft)
- Listing: Munro

Naming
- English translation: Aged Hill, Hill of the Inn
- Language of name: Gaelic
- Pronunciation: Scottish Gaelic: [ˈkʰaːrˠn ˈɯːs̪t̪ə]

Geography
- Location: Aberdeenshire, Scotland
- Parent range: Grampians
- OS grid: NO134791
- Topo map: OS Landranger 43, OS Explorer 387

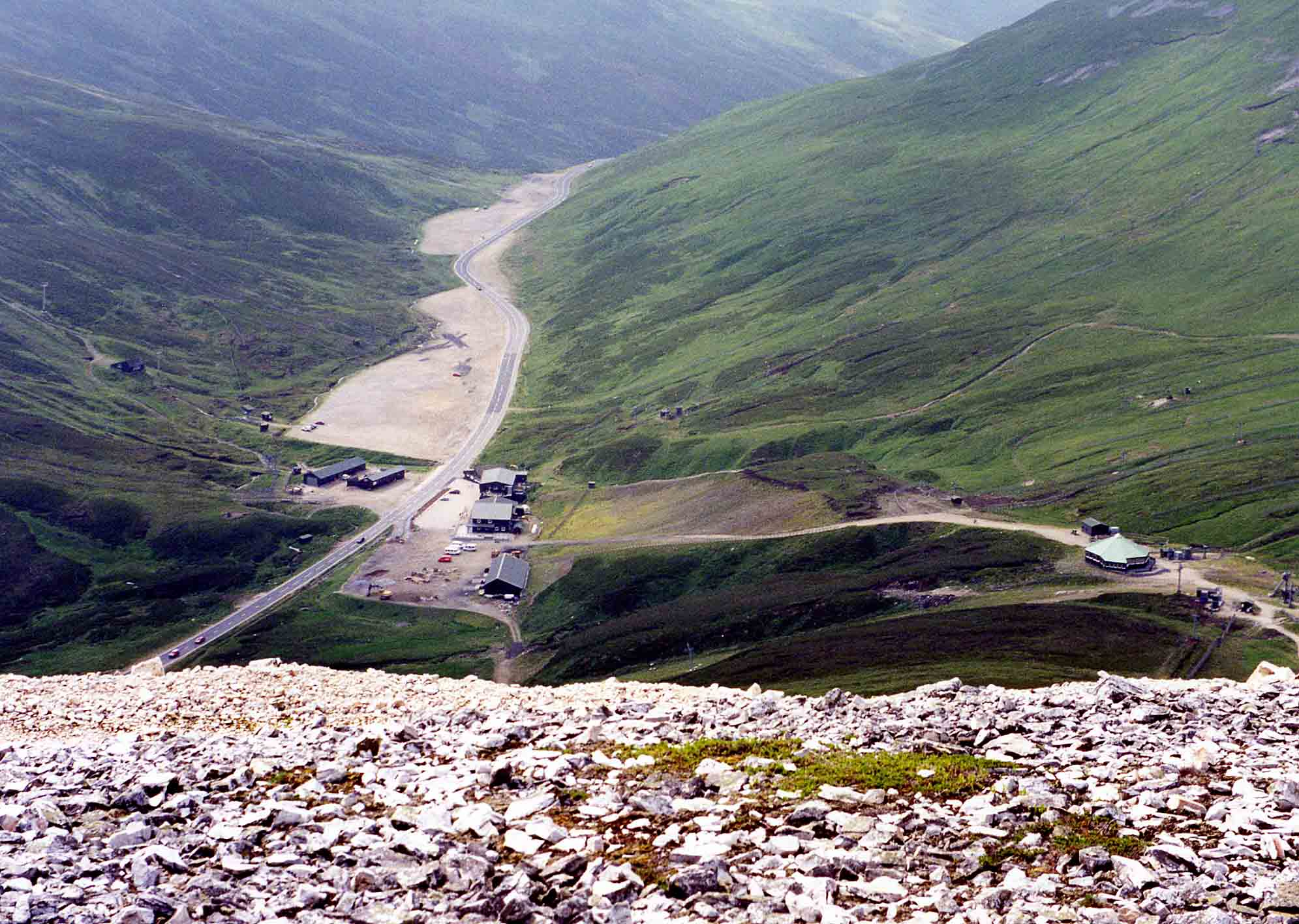
Looking down on the Glenshee ski centre from the summit of Càrn Aosda.

Càrn Aosda is a Scottish mountain situated 12.5 km south of the town of Braemar, in the county of Aberdeenshire. It stands near the summit of the Cairnwell Pass on the A93 road, in the midst of the Glenshee Ski Centre.

== Overview ==
Càrn Aosda reaches a height of 917 metres (3008 feet), at one point in time it had the honour of being the lowest of the Munros but more accurate mapping techniques have changed this and it is now the 279th ranked mountain in that classification. Càrn Aosda, along with the adjoining Munro of The Cairnwell, is regarded as the easiest of the Munros to ascend, this is because of the high starting altitude of over 640 metres at the ski centre and the easy walking conditions on rough vehicle tracks which lead directly to the summit. A fit hill walker can complete the 275 metre ascent from the centre car park in half an hour.

Apart from being the easiest Munro, Càrn Aosda also has the reputation as being one of the most despoiled, with the mountain having snow fences, ski tow supports, huts and vehicle tracks right up to the summit as part of the Glenshee ski centre. The mountain has four pistes on its slopes, there is a run for beginners plus two for intermediate level on the easier slopes which go south from the summit into Butchart’s Corrie. There is a piste ranked as difficult on the steeper slopes of the eastern shoulder. There are also three towbar lifts on the southern slopes to service the ski runs one of which goes past the 900 metre mark to just a few metres from the summit.

The mountain's name translates from the Scottish Gaelic language as "Aged Hill/Cairn" with aosda meaning aged or ancient and most guide books carry this meaning. However an alternative meaning has been put forward as “Hill of the Inn” derived from the word òsda, in history there was an inn at the foot of the mountain at the Sean Spittal bridge where the Cairnwell Burn flows under the main Cairnwell pass road and this is could possibly have given the mountain its name.

== Geography ==
Càrn Aosda throws out a four km long northern ridge which descends to the hamlet of Baddoch on the A93 road. Another shorter ridge goes NE and along with the north ridge encloses the Dubh-choire. Càrn Aosda's southern slopes descend into Butchart’s corrie which is drained by the headwaters of the Cairnwell Burn, the corrie is surprisingly unnamed on OS maps being well known by the skiing fraternity with two of the ski tows being named Butcharts access poma and Butcharts T Bar respectively.

The easy inclined broad slopes which go south west from the summit descends to the 795 metre col at the head of Butchart’s corrie from here the neighbouring Munros of The Cairnwell and Càrn a' Gheòidh can be easily climbed. 200 metres west of the col is Loch Vrotachan, owned by the Ballater Angling club this offers good trout fishing at a height of 750 metres. The summit itself is made up of small light coloured quartzite rocks, giving the mountain a distinctive appearance. There are twin summit bumps with the western top having a height of 903 metres while the true top lies 400 metres to the east and is marked by a small pile of quartzite boulders. Càrn Aosda very much belongs to the eastern half of Scotland and all drainage goes via Glen Clunie and the River Dee to reach the east coast at Aberdeen.

== Ascents and view ==
Càrn Aosda is invariably climbed with one or both of the nearby Munros of The Cairnwell and Càrn a' Gheòidh. This walk offers the Munro bagger the opportunity of climbing three Munros with minimum effort. The walk starts at the ski centre car park and only involves 580 metres of climbing to ascend the three mountains from the col at the head of Butchart’s corrie; this can be done in three hours. A more aesthetically pleasing route for the mountain purist which avoids the ski area altogether begins on the A93 at the start of the track to Baddoch (grid reference NO138831) and climbs the long north ridge to the summit. The view from the summit takes in the ski area to the south but in other directions there are excellent vistas of the mountains of the Mounth and the Cairngorms.
