= Auchallater =

Coordinates: 56.977988°N 3.390650°W

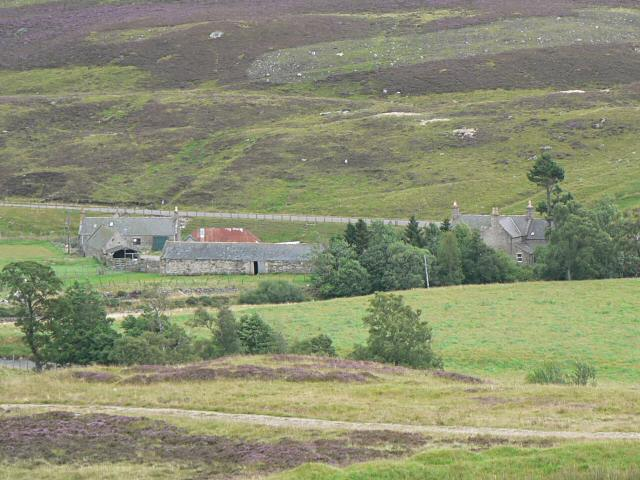
- Auchallater

- Location within Aberdeenshire
- OS grid reference: NO156883
- Council area: Aberdeenshire
- Lieutenancy area: Aberdeenshire
- Country: Scotland
- Sovereign state: United Kingdom
- Post town: BALLATER
- Postcode district: AB35
- Dialling code: 013397
- Police: Scotland
- Fire: Scottish
- Ambulance: Scottish
- UK Parliament: West Aberdeenshire and Kincardine
- Scottish Parliament: Aberdeenshire West

Auchallater is a hamlet in Aberdeenshire, Scotland. It lies along the A93 road, to the south of Braemar.

== Geography ==
In 1872, the farms estates of Auchallater and Baddoch, including Newbigging and Coirenaleirg in the Auchallater estate, covered an area of 20,200 acres (8,175 ha). Geologically, grey garnetiferous schist is found in Auchallataer.

Several streams run nearby, with the confluence of Clunie Water and Callater Burn in the vicinity and just to the west and Millstone Burn to the east. Loch Callater is also near, and is the source of Callater Burn.

== Economy ==
A "little lairdship", Auchallatter is a sheepfarming hamlet. Auchallater Farm charge hikers for car parking near the south side of the bridge over Callater Burn.
