= Càrn a' Gheòidh =

Mountain in the Scottish Highlands

Coordinates: 56°52′24″N 3°27′55″W

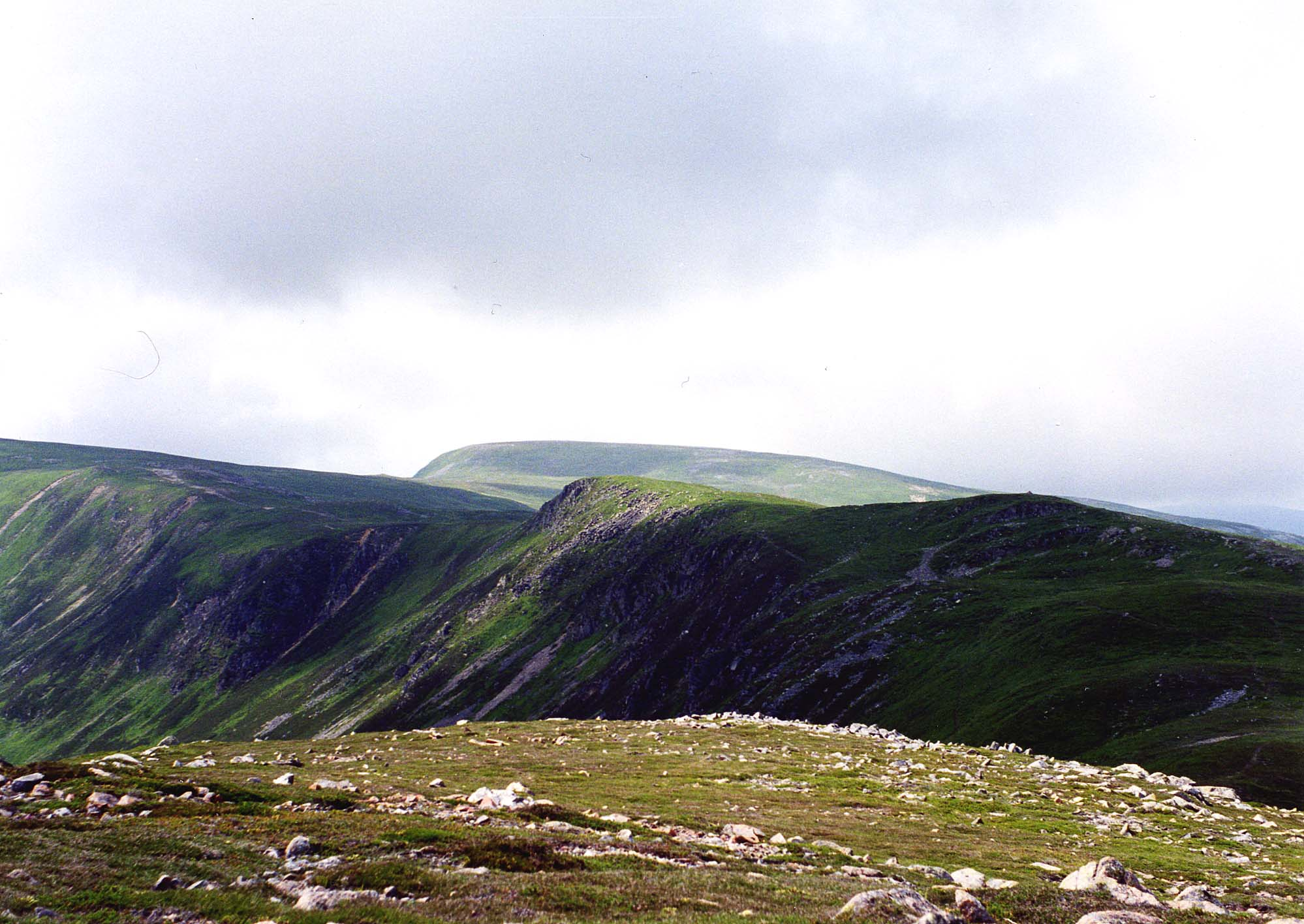
- Looking along the NE ridge to Càrn a' Gheòidh from the top of Butchart‘s Corrie.

Highest point
- Elevation: 975 m (3,199 ft)
- Prominence: 298 m (978 ft)
- Listing: Munro, Marilyn

Naming
- English translation: hill of the goose
- Language of name: Gaelic
- Pronunciation: Scottish Gaelic: [ˈkʰaːrˠn ə ˈʝɔːj]

Geography
- Location: Perth and Kinross / Aberdeenshire, Scotland
- Parent range: Grampians
- OS grid: NO107767
- Topo map: OS Landranger 43, OS Explorer 387

Listed summits of Càrn a' Gheòidh
Name	Grid ref	Height	Status
Càrn Bhinnein	NO091762	917 m (3008 ft)	Munro Top

Càrn a' Gheòidh or Càrn Gheòidh is a mountain in the Mounth region of the Scottish Highlands. It lies 15 km south of the town of Braemar. Its summit stands on the border between the council areas of Perth and Kinross and Aberdeenshire.

== Overview ==
Càrn a' Gheòidh reaches a height of 975 metres (3199 feet) and is classified as both a Munro and a Marilyn. It is a very accessible hill and when climbed from the Glenshee Ski Centre along with the adjacent mountains of The Cairnwell and Càrn Aosda makes for a very easy round of three Munros for the peak bagger. The mountain is not easily seen to good effect from any main road being completely hidden from the summit of the A93 road by The Cairnwell and Càrn Aosda. It is quite modest in appearance with the smooth slopes of the summit rising unpretentiously above the surrounding high moorland and the hills long ridges. The best views of Càrn a' Gheòidh are obtained from nearby peaks. The mountain's name translates as “Hill of the Goose”, the meaning of which is hard to fathom, although Loch Vrotachan which lies 2 km to the NE may have had geese nesting on it at some time.

== Landscape ==
Càrn a' Gheòidh has a 3 km NE ridge connecting to the bealach between The Cairnwell and Càrn Aosda above Butchart‘s corrie. The highest point of this ridge is Càrn nan Sac (920 metres), a subsidiary top of Carn a' Gheoidh formerly listed in Munros Tables before being deleted in 1981. There are two small lochans on the ridge. Another ridge leads west and then SW to the Munro “Top” of Càrn Bhinnein (917 metres). This peak has more character than the Munro and its steep rocky slopes fall SW into upper Gleann Taitneach.

Further ridges go north and south from the summit. The northern ridge descends to the valley of the Baddoch Burn. To the south, a broad crest descends for 5 km over the subsidiary tops of Càrn Mòr (876 metres) and Creagan Bheithe (759 metres) via a col of c.600m to the Corbett Ben Gulabin. All drainage from Carn a' Gheoidh is to the east coast of Scotland; however the mountain stands on the watershed between the River Tay and the River Dee with rainfall reaching the North Sea at Aberdeen or the Firth of Tay more than 80 km apart.

== Climbing ==
The easiest and most popular ascent of Càrn a' Gheòidh starts at the Glenshee Ski Centre on the A93 road (grid reference NO139780). The starting height of 640 metres gives an easy ascent of just over 300 metres. The route goes west through the ski area to reach the head of Butchart’s corrie and then along the NE ridge, initially skirting the lip of the steep Coire Dhirich, then passing over Càrn nan Sac to reach the summit. A longer southern approach (14 km) that avoids the Glenshee Ski Area starts at Spittal of Glenshee (grid reference NO110702) and ascends by the southern ridge. This walk can be combined with the ascent of the Ben Gulabin. The summit of the mountain is marked by a cairn of boulders and a circular wind shelter. Carn a' Gheoidh is the highest ground over an area of several square kilometres and gives a good uninterrupted view of the Cairngorms and the Beinn a' Ghlò massif.
