= Loch Vrotachan =

Loch In Scotland

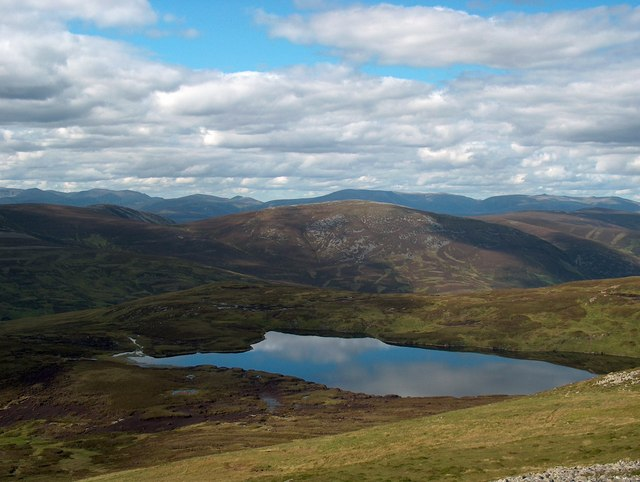

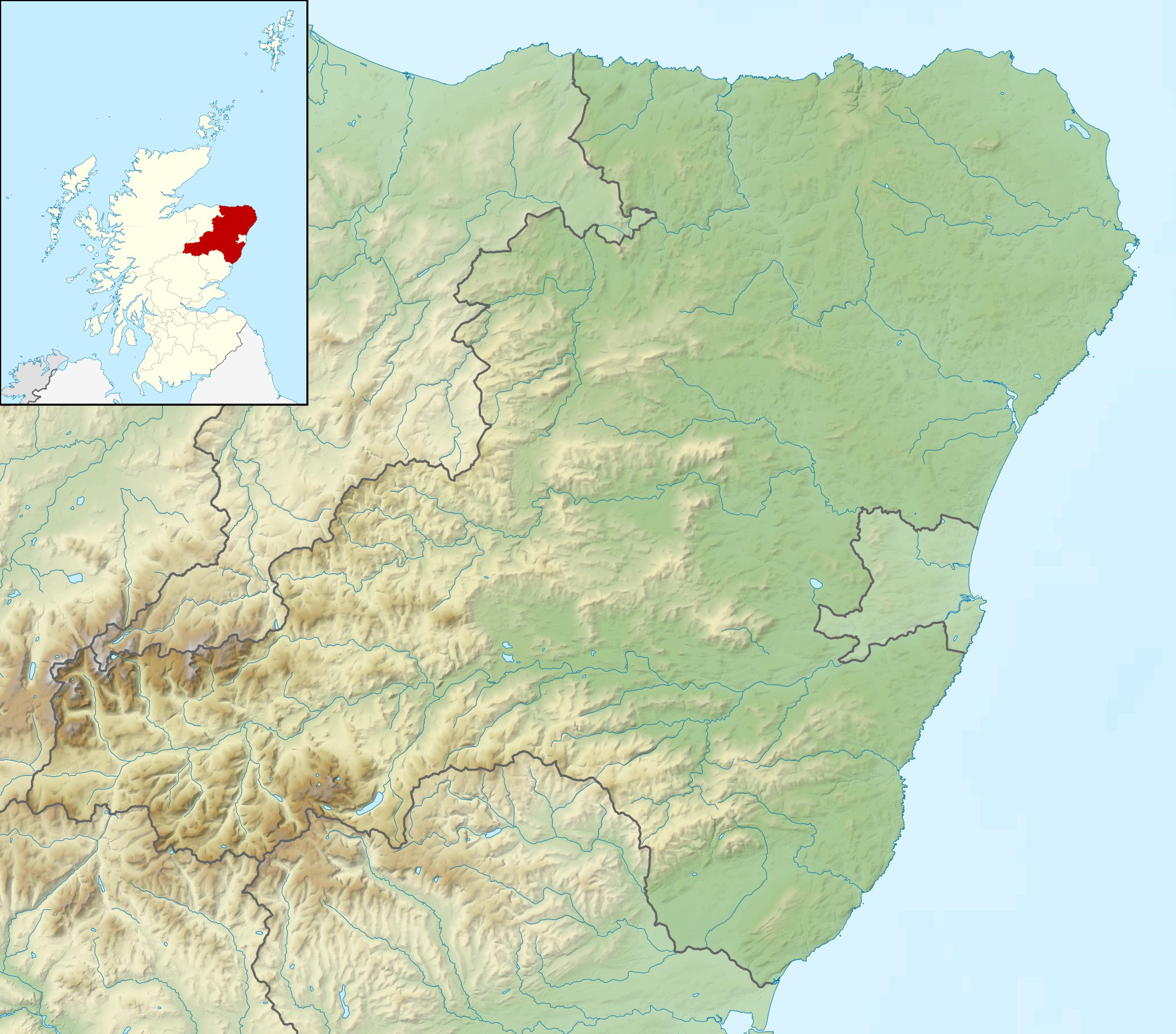
- Location in Aberdeenshire, Scotland
- Location: Aberdeenshire, Scotland
- Coordinates: 56°53′25″N 3°26′30″W
- Type: freshwater loch
- Primary outflows: Baddoch Burn, Clunie Water, River Dee, North Sea
- Catchment area: 67 ha (170 acres)
- Basin countries: Scotland
- Max. length: 1,670 ft (510 m)
- Max. width: 200 m (660 ft)
- Surface area: 22 acres (9 ha)
- Average depth: 6.9 m (23 ft)
- Water volume: 642,076 km^{3} (154,042 cu mi)
- Surface elevation: 748 m (2,454 ft)
- Settlements: Braemar

Loch Vrotachan, also known as Loch Brodichan or Loch Brothacan, is a freshwater lake on the southwestern edge of the Scottish council area of Aberdeenshire. It is located in the Grampian Mountains about 13 km (8.1 mi) south of Braemar.

== Geography ==
The lake lies at an altitude of 748 meters above sea level. Loch Vrotachan has a maximum length of 0.51 kilometers and a maximum width of 0.20 kilometers, resulting in an area of 9 hectares and a circumference of one kilometer. The lake has a volume of 642,076 kiloliters. Its catchment area is 67 hectares. Loch Vrotachan has an average depth of 6.9 meters. On the western bank flows the Allt Loch Vrotachan, which flows into the Baddoch Burn, which drains into the North Sea via the Clunie Water and the River Dee.

The Loch Vrotachan catchment area extends eastwards to the slopes of the 933 meter high The Cairnwell, which marks the border with the neighboring Perth and Kinross council area or the traditional county of Perthshire. The shores of Loch Vrotachan are uninhabited. The Glen Shee ski area begins east of the lake.
