= Carn an Tuirc =

Mountain in the Scottish Highlands

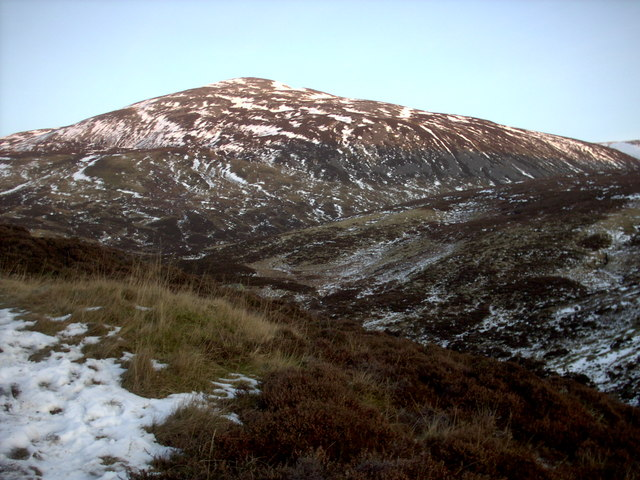
- The western slopes

Highest point
- Elevation: 1,019 m (3,343 ft)
- Prominence: 64 m (210 ft)
- Parent peak: Cairn of Claise
- Listing: Munro
- Coordinates: 56°54′30″N 3°21′28″W

Naming
- English translation: hill of the turkey

Geography
- Location within Scotland
- Location: Scotland
- Parent range: Grampian Mountains

Climbing
- Easiest route: Walk

Carn an Tuirc (Scottish Gaelic: Càrn an Tuirc, 'hill of the wild boar') is a mountain in the Mounth region of the Grampian Mountains, in the Scottish Highlands. It is about two miles from the Glenshee Ski Centre near Braemar.
