= Baddoch Burn =

River in Aberdeenshire, Scotland

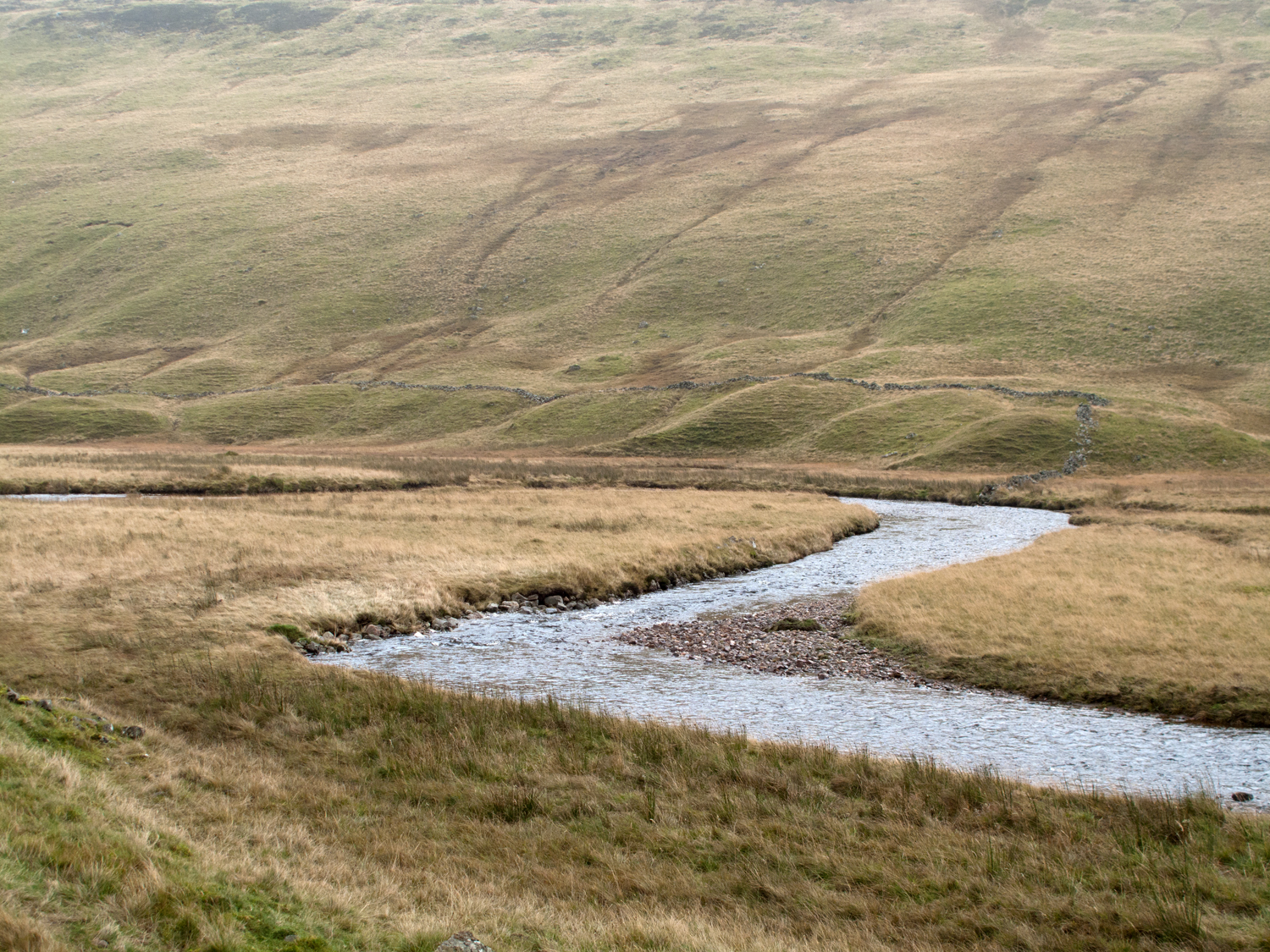
- Middle reaches of the Baddoch Burn

Location
- Country: Scotland

Physical characteristics
- Mouth: Clunie Water
  - location: Braemar, Scotland
  - coordinates: 56°56′0″N 3°25′12″W

Baddoch Burn is a river of Aberdeenshire, Scotland.

== Description ==
The Baddoch Burn rises in the center of the Grampian Mountains on the northern slope of Carn a' Chlarsaich in southwest Aberdeenshire near the border with the neighboring Perth and Kinross council area or the traditional county of Perthshire. A stream rising a short distance to the west is one of the source streams of the Ey Burn, which also drains into the North Sea via the River Dee. For the first three kilometers the Baddoch Burn flows primarily in an easterly direction before turning northeast. During its approximately 9.5 kilometer long course, the Baddoch Burn takes in various streams, including the Allt Loch Vrotachan, which flows out of Loch Vrotachan and flows in from the right. Around eight kilometers south of Braemar, the Baddoch Burn flows from the left into Clunie Water, which flows into the Dee at Braemar.

The Baddoch Burn catchment area covers 2260 hectares. The main rocks are quartzite and slate. There is a water measuring station at a weir a short distance from the mouth at an altitude of 415 meters. The banks of the Baddoch Burn are now uninhabited. However, on the right bank of the lower reaches there are remains of an agricultural settlement consisting of longhouses typical of the region.
