= Cairn of Claise =

Mountain in Grampians, Scotland

Coordinates: 56.89417°N 3.338637°W

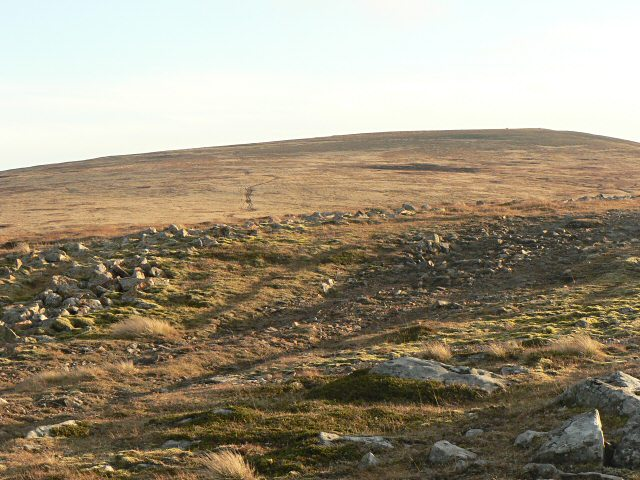
- View up the slopes to the summit

Highest point
- Elevation: 1,063.1 m (3,488 ft)
- Prominence: 118.9 m (390 ft)
- Parent peak: Glas Maol
- Listing: Munro

Naming
- English translation: Hill of the Hollow

Geography

Climbing
- Easiest route: Walk over Carn an Tuirc

Cairn of Claise is a mountain in the Grampians of Scotland, located about three miles from the Glenshee Ski Center near Braemar.

It has an elevation of 1,063.1 m (3,488 ft) and a prominence of 118.9 m (390 ft) and is a Munro.

The mountain's name is said to mean "Hill of the hollows".
