= Callater Burn =

River in Aberdeenshire, Scotland

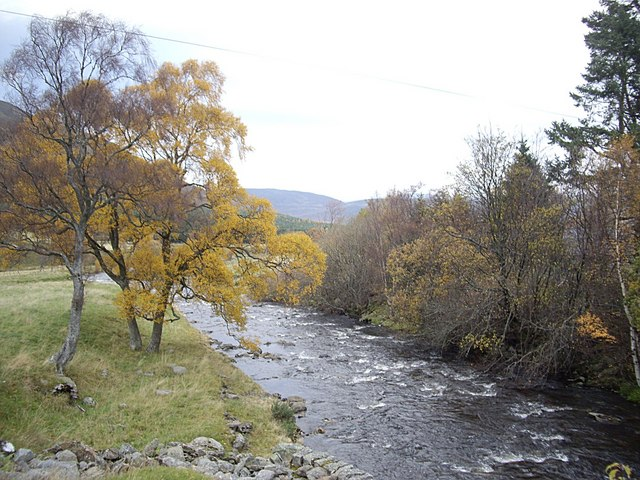

Location
- Country: Scotland
- Council area: Aberdeenshire

Physical characteristics
- Source
  - location: Drain from Loch Callater
  - coordinates: 56°56′34″N 3°21′12″W
  - elevation: 501 m (1,644 ft)
- Mouth
  - location: 3 km (1.9 mi) south of Braemar into the Clunie Water
  - coordinates: 56°58′44″N 3°23′30″W
- Length: 6 km (3.7 mi)

The Callater Burn is a river in the Scottish council area of Aberdeenshire. Queen Victoria's last excursion with her husband Prince Albert, who died in 1861, is said to have taken place on 16 October of the same year through Glen Clunie to Glen Callater, which Albert is said to have admired for its beauty.

== Geography ==
The Callater Burn flows on its northwest bank from Loch Callater, located at an altitude of 501 m (1,644 ft) in the central Grampian Mountains. It initially flows for two kilometers in a primarily northwesterly direction. It then turns north for another 2.5 km (1.6 mi) before flowing northwest again. Three kilometers south of Braemar, after a total of around six kilometers, the Callater Burn flows from the right into the Clunie Water, which drains into the North Sea via the River Dee. The Callater Burn passes the Creag nan Gabhar, the Creag an Loch and the Meall an t-Slugain.

Its valley, Glen Callater, also includes Loch Callater and its main tributary, the Allt na Loch. It leads to the Tolmount near the Angus border. The banks of the Callater Burns are unpopulated. Near its mouth, Auchallater Bridge, a modern bridge along the A93, spans the river.
