= The Cairnwell =

Scottish mountain

Coordinates: 56.87897°N 3.42259°W

- Scottish Gaelic: An Càrn Bhalg
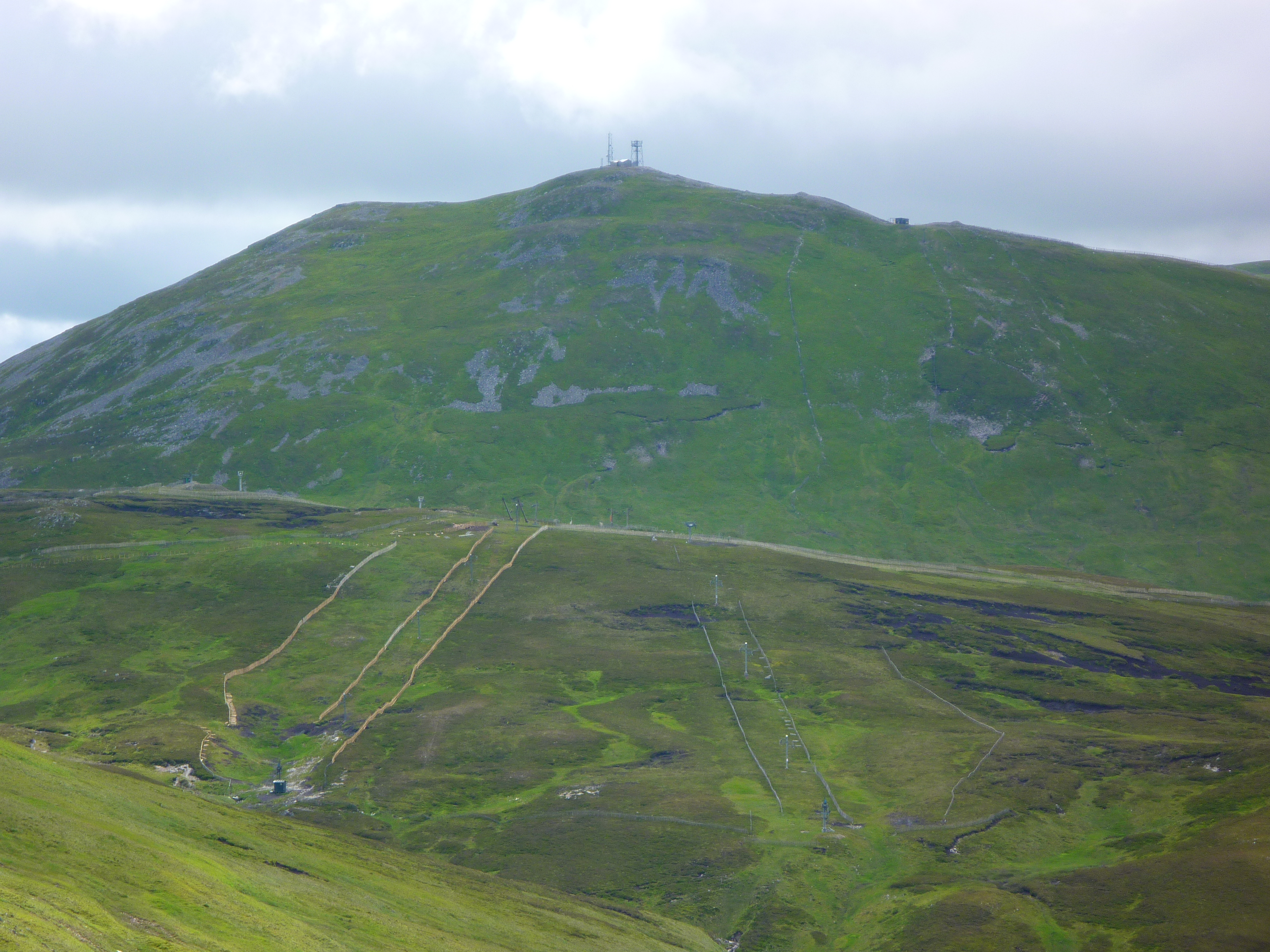
- The north-eastern side of The Cairnwell as seen from near Sron na Gaoithe.

Highest point
- Elevation: 933 m (3,061 ft)
- Prominence: 125 m (410 ft)
- Listing: Munro

Naming
- Language of name: Scottish Gaelic
- Pronunciation: Scottish Gaelic: [əŋˈkʰaːrˠn ˈvɛlɛkʲ]

Geography
- Location: Aberdeenshire / Perth & Kinross, Scotland
- Parent range: Cairngorms
- OS grid: NO134773
- Topo map: OS Landranger 43, OS Explorer 387

The Cairnwell (Scottish Gaelic: An Càrn Bhalg) is a mountain in the Eastern Highlands of Scotland, south of Braemar. It is often considered to be one of the most spoiled of the Munros, due to the Glenshee Ski Centre which covers the eastern slope of the mountain.

The Cairnwell is usually climbed from the Glen Shee ski centre, which is at an elevation of 650 m, making this probably the easiest Munro to climb. It is often climbed with Carn Aosda.

The A93 crosses the shoulder of the mountain via the Cairnwell Pass.
