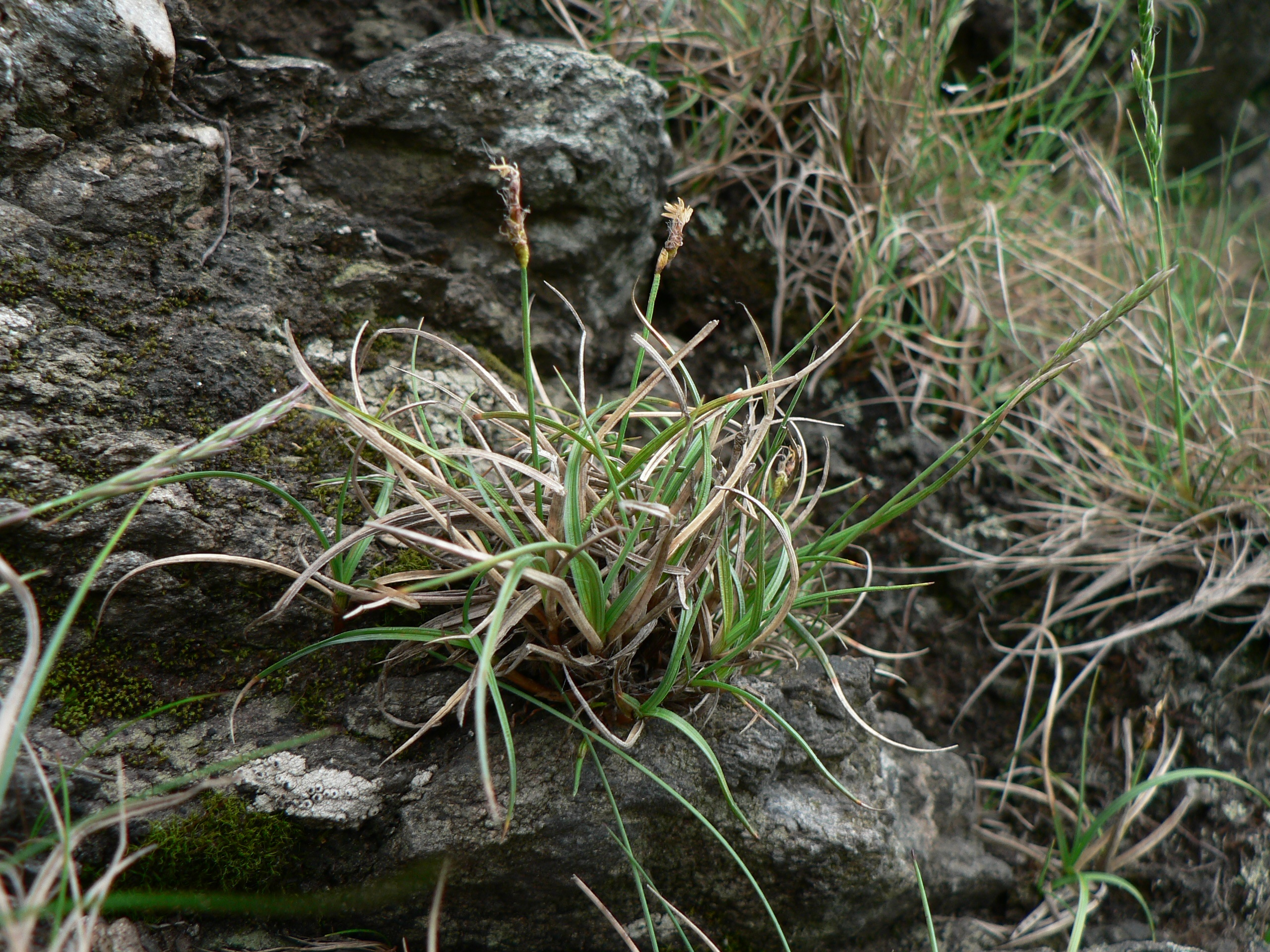
- On a mountainside in the Czech Republic

Conservation status
- Secure (NatureServe)

Scientific classification
- Kingdom: Plantae
- Clade: Tracheophytes
- Clade: Angiosperms
- Clade: Monocots
- Clade: Commelinids
- Order: Poales
- Family: Cyperaceae
- Genus: Carex
- Species: C. rupestris

Binomial name
- Carex rupestris All.

Subspecies
- Carex rupestris subsp. altimontana T.V.Ebel; Carex rupestris subsp. rupestris

Synonyms
- Species: Caricinella rupestris (All.) St.-Lag.; Edritria rupestris (All.) Raf.; subsp. altimontana: Carex altimontana (T.V.Ebel) Schekhovts.; subsp. rupestris: Carex attenuata R.Br.; Carex drummondiana Dewey; Carex dufourei Lapeyr.; Carex petraea Wahlenb.; Carex pulicaris var. montana Pugsley; Carex rupestris var. drummondiana (Dewey) L.H.Bailey; Carex rupestris subsp. drummondiana (Dewey) Holub; Carex rupestris f. pygmaea Bolzon; Edritria petraea (Wahlenb.) Raf.

= Carex rupestris =

Species of flowering plant in the sedge family

Carex rupestris, called the curly sedge and rock sedge (names it shares with other members of its genus), is a species of flowering plant in the family Cyperaceae, native to temperate and subarctic North America, Greenland, Iceland, Europe, and Asia.

== Description ==
Carex rupestris is a type of sedge, growing between 10–20 centimetres (4–8 inches) in height. It grows in dense, matted tufts. Rhizome branch lengths measure 0.4–5.0 cm (0.2–2.0 in). Aerial shoots ascend from the rhizome, with dead leaves persisting for several years and giving the stands a typical straw-yellow colour, recognizable at a distance. Leaves are up to 2 millimetres (0.08 inches) wide and channelled, appearing at the base of the stem. The inflorescence is composed of a single spike at the top of the stem. Rhizomes are brown or black, with a scaly appearance. The species fruits in late spring to summer.

== Distribution and habitat ==
Carex rupestris is an arctic-alpine species found at higher altitudes. It favours dry ground, heathland, talus slopes, and rocky outcrops and ledges. Carex rupestris subsp. altimontana is found only in the Altai Republic of Russia.

== Taxonomy ==
The following subspecies are currently accepted:

- Carex rupestris subsp. altimontana T.V.Ebel
- Carex rupestris subsp. rupestris

== Conservation ==
Carex rupestris is considered an endangered species across the Carpathian Mountains due to the effect of climate change. It is extirpated in Bulgaria. In North America, as of November 2024, NatureServe listed C. rupestris as Globally Secure (G5). This status was last reviewed on 15 July 2016. In individual provinces and states, it is listed as Critically Imperiled (S1) in South Dakota; Imperiled (S2) in Manitoba, Ontario, and Quebec; and, Vulnerable (S3) in Alberta and Newfoundland.
