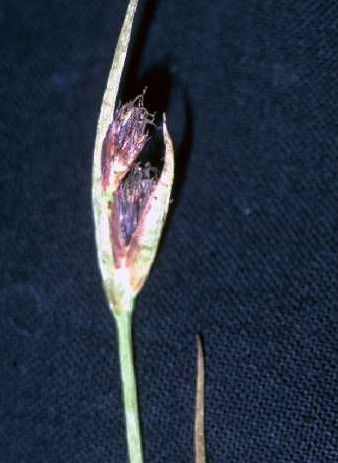

Conservation status
- Secure (NatureServe)

Scientific classification
- Kingdom: Plantae
- Clade: Tracheophytes
- Clade: Angiosperms
- Clade: Monocots
- Clade: Commelinids
- Order: Poales
- Family: Juncaceae
- Genus: Juncus
- Species: J. castaneus

Binomial name
- Juncus castaneus Sm.

= Juncus castaneus =

Species of grass

Juncus castaneus is a species of rush known by the common name chestnut rush. It has a circumboreal or circumpolar distribution, occurring throughout the northern latitudes of the Northern Hemisphere. It occurs in Europe, Asia, and North America. In North America it occurs from Alaska to Greenland, its distribution spanning Canada and extending south through the Rocky Mountains in the contiguous United States. It is widespread and common in the Canadian Arctic Archipelago.

This perennial plant produces stems up to 50 centimeters tall, singly or in pairs, from a rhizome. There are a few leaves, the longest basal ones reaching 20 centimeters in length. There are one to five flower heads, each containing up to 10 or 12 flowers. Each flower has 3 brown tepals and 6 stamens. The fruit is a dry, dark brown or chestnut capsule. The seed is a few millimeters long, including its long tail. The plant reproduces by seed and by rhizome.

This plant grows in Arctic habitat types, and farther south, on high mountains in alpine climates. It grows in wet areas, such as streambanks, bogs, and seeps.
