= Glas Maol =

Mountain in the Highlands of Scotland

Coordinates: 56.87239°N 3.36820°W

- A' Ghlas-Mheall
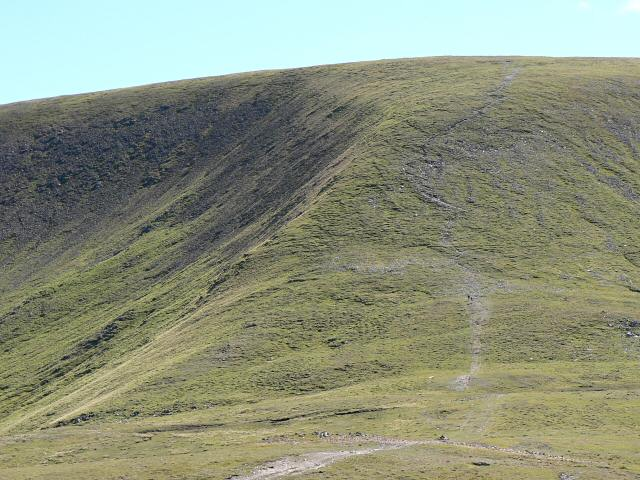
- The western side of Glas Maol, from near the head of the ski area

Highest point
- Elevation: 1,068 m (3,504 ft)
- Prominence: 194 m (636 ft)
- Parent peak: Lochnagar
- Listing: Munro, Marilyn, Council top (Angus), County top, (Angus)

Naming
- English translation: Grey-green hill
- Language of name: Gaelic
- Pronunciation: Scottish Gaelic: [ˈkl̪ˠas̪ ˈmɯːl̪ˠ]

Geography
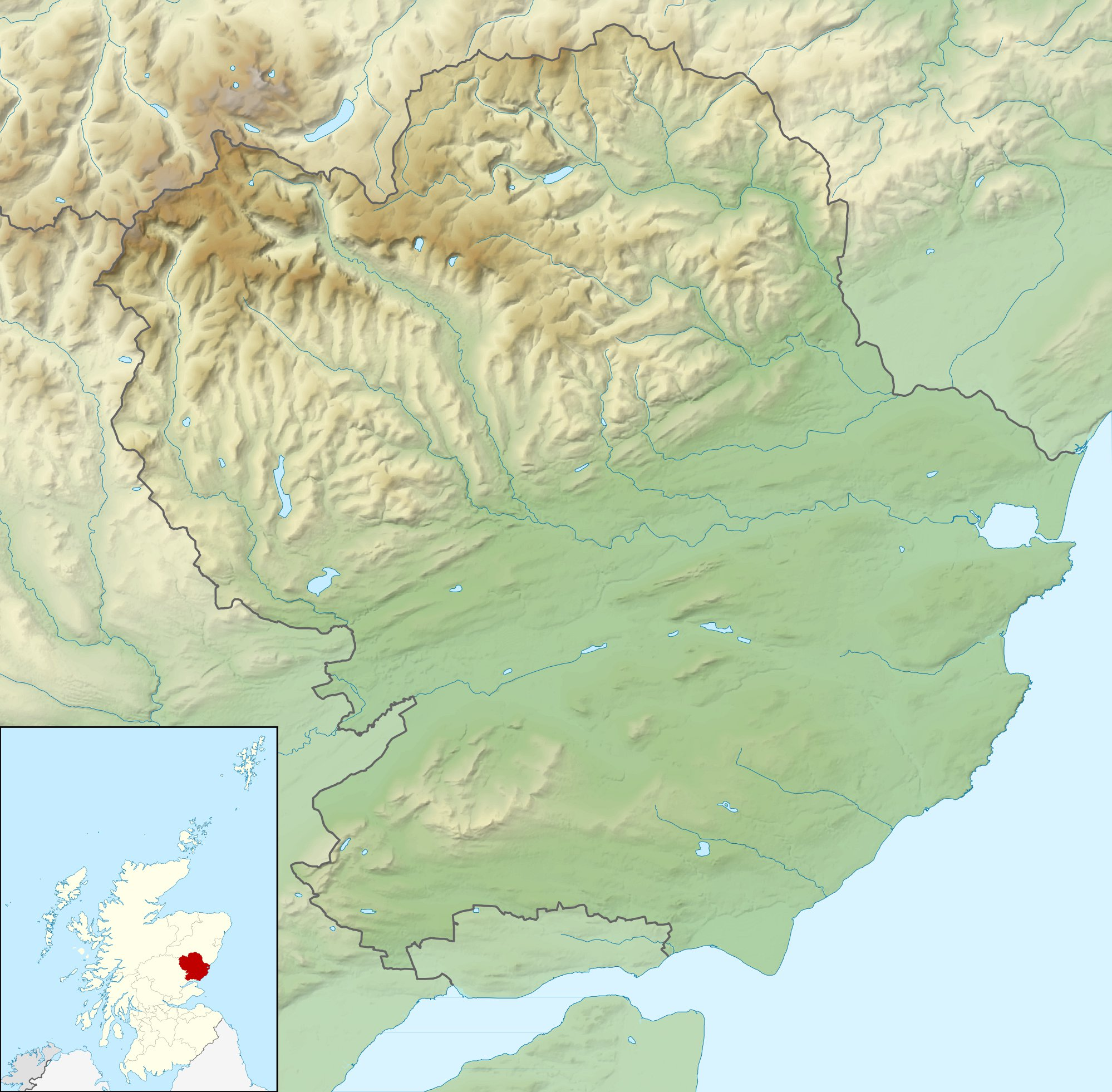
- Location within Angus Location within Scotland
- Location: Mounth, Scotland
- OS grid: NO167765
- Topo map: OS Landranger 43

Glas Maol (Scottish Gaelic: A' Ghlas-Mheall) is a mountain in the Mounth, in the southeastern part of the Highlands of Scotland. The broad, flat summit is divided between the council area of Aberdeenshire, Angus and Perth and Kinross, though the highest point lies wholly within Angus; indeed Glas Maol is the highest point in that council area. Glas Maol is both a Munro and a Marilyn. The western slopes of Glas Maol form part of the Glenshee Ski Centre ski area. The most common route of ascent goes through the slopes, starting from the highest point of the A93 road, the Cairnwell pass. This is the highest public road in Scotland; hence only around 400 m of ascent is involved. Glas Maol is often climbed in conjunction with Creag Leacach to the south or Cairn of Claise to the north. The broad ridge linking these peaks is topped by a dry-stone dyke, which approximately corresponds to the border of the Angus council area.
