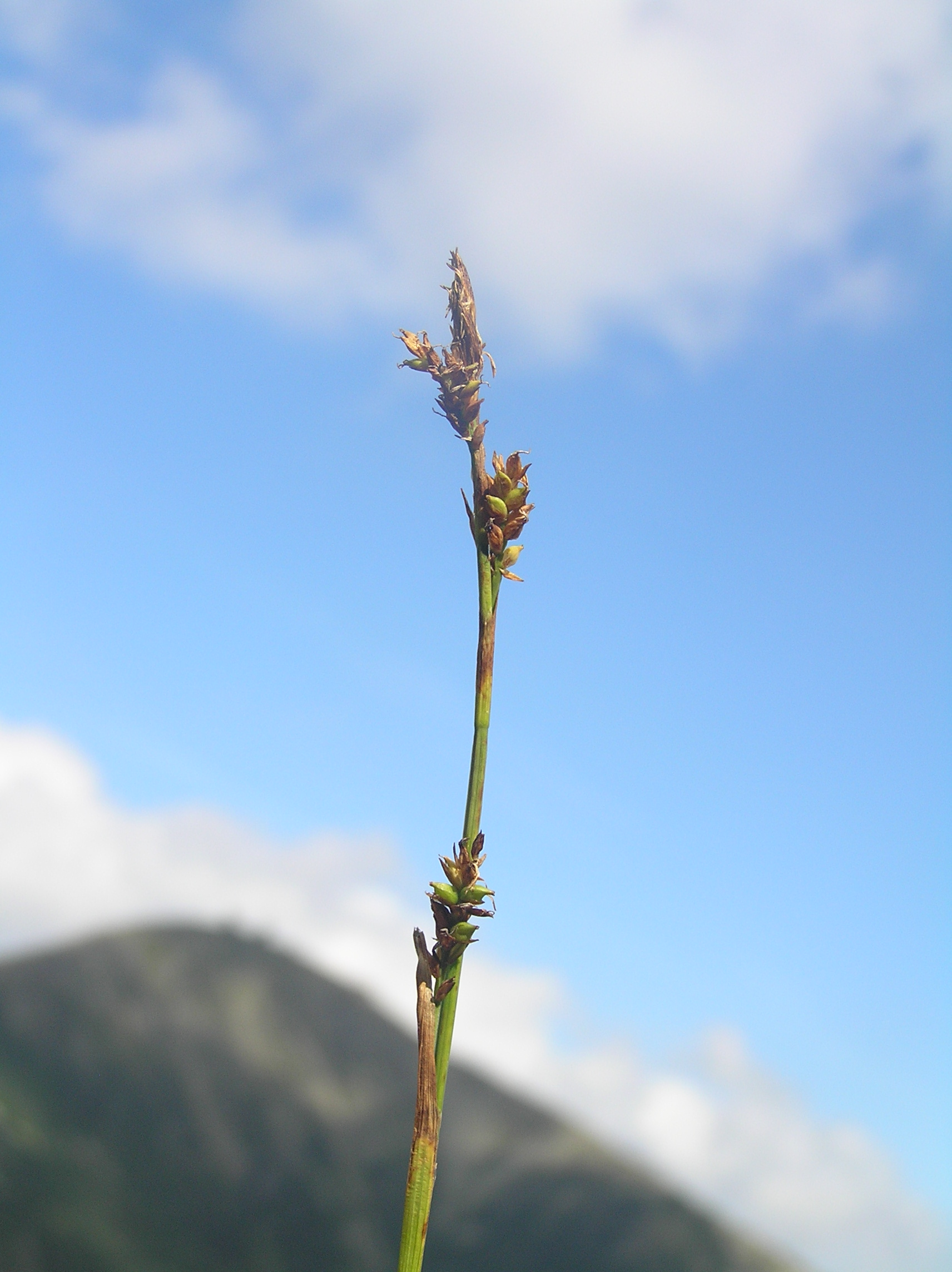

Conservation status
- Secure (NatureServe)

Scientific classification
- Kingdom: Plantae
- Clade: Tracheophytes
- Clade: Angiosperms
- Clade: Monocots
- Clade: Commelinids
- Order: Poales
- Family: Cyperaceae
- Genus: Carex
- Species: C. vaginata

Binomial name
- Carex vaginata Tausch

= Carex vaginata =

Species of grass-like plant

Carex vaginata is a species of sedge known by the common name sheathed sedge.

== Description ==
This sedge produces stems up to 60 centimeters tall, growing from a long rhizome. The stem just below the inflorescence is sheathed in the base of the bract, the characteristic that gives the plant its name. The inflorescence contains a terminal spike and usually at least one lateral spike. The plant reproduces by seed and by sprouting from the rhizome and the stolons, and from buds at the bases of the stems. Leaves 0.7-2.8 cm wide.

== Distribution and range ==
It has a circumboreal distribution, occurring throughout the northern latitudes of the Northern Hemisphere. It occurs in Alaska, throughout most all of Canada to Greenland and in Eurasia. In North America it occurs as far south as Minnesota and New York.

== Habitat and ecology ==
This sedge grows in many types of moist and wet habitat. It is present on tundra and in boreal forests. It grows in sandy, calcareous, and acidic, peaty soils. It may be found growing in snow, which might help to protect it from dry and cold conditions.

== Conservation status ==
In North America it is considered widespread, abundant and secure. On the international IUCN red list it has most recently been assessed to be least concern (LC).
