= Cairnwell Pass =

Mountain pass in Aberdeenshire, Scotland

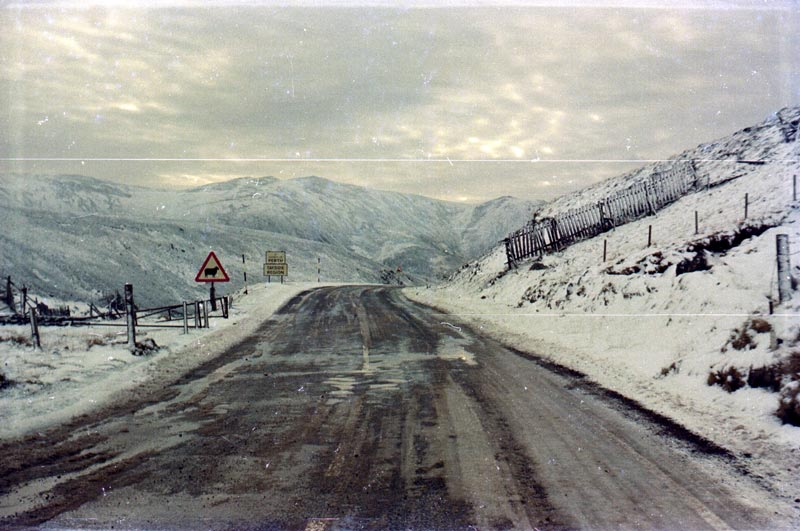
Looking south in winter

The Cairnwell Pass is a mountain pass on the A93 road between Glen Shee, Perthshire, and Braemar, Aberdeenshire, in the Scottish Highlands. The border between the two counties crosses the summit of the pass. With a summit altitude of 670 m (2,200 ft), the Cairnwell Pass is the highest main road in the United Kingdom, and at the summit is the Glenshee Ski Centre, Scotland's largest and oldest ski centre. Historically, the pass was a drover's route from the Lowlands to the Highlands. The road is often blocked by snow in the winter, with snow gates at Braemar, at the summit (south of the Ski Centre), and at the Spittal of Glenshee.

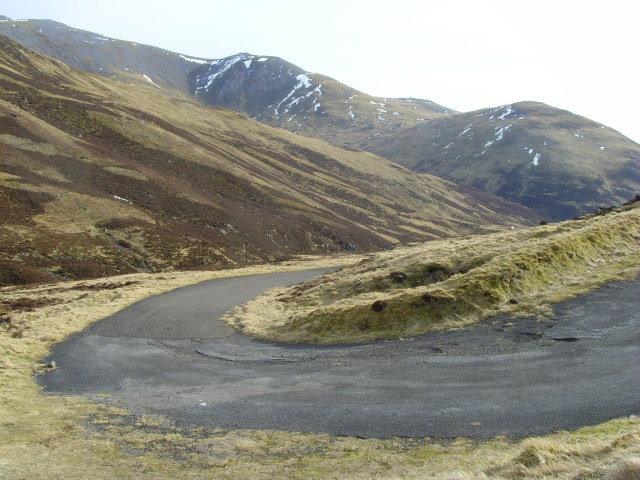
The Devil's Elbow

A notorious double-hairpin bend known as the Devil's Elbow is 1 mi (1.6 km) south of the summit. The often-quoted gradient of 33 per cent (1 in 3) is a myth: in reality it is no more than 1 in 6 (17%). The double bend, which was part of a 1749 military road, can be seen on Taylor & Skinner's 1776 Highlands map, it was bypassed in the 1960s. The old military road route can be still walked, or carefully cycled.

== Climate ==
Cairnwell Pass has tundra climate (Köppen ET).

Climate data for Cairnwell Pass, Elevation: 933 m (3,061 ft), 1991–2020
| Month | Jan | Feb | Mar | Apr | May | Jun | Jul | Aug | Sep | Oct | Nov | Dec | Year |
|---|---|---|---|---|---|---|---|---|---|---|---|---|---|
| Mean daily maximum °C (°F) | 0.5 (32.9) | 0.3 (32.5) | 1.5 (34.7) | 4.3 (39.7) | 7.8 (46.0) | 10.5 (50.9) | 12.1 (53.8) | 11.3 (52.3) | 9.2 (48.6) | 5.4 (41.7) | 2.7 (36.9) | 1.0 (33.8) | 5.6 (42.0) |
| Daily mean °C (°F) | −1.5 (29.3) | −1.8 (28.8) | −0.7 (30.7) | 1.6 (34.9) | 4.7 (40.5) | 7.4 (45.3) | 9.1 (48.4) | 8.7 (47.7) | 6.8 (44.2) | 3.4 (38.1) | 0.7 (33.3) | −1.1 (30.0) | 3.2 (37.8) |
| Mean daily minimum °C (°F) | −3.4 (25.9) | −3.8 (25.2) | −2.9 (26.8) | −1.2 (29.8) | 1.6 (34.9) | 4.3 (39.7) | 6.1 (43.0) | 6.2 (43.2) | 4.3 (39.7) | 1.4 (34.5) | −1.2 (29.8) | −3.2 (26.2) | 0.7 (33.2) |
Source: Met Office

Climate data for Cairnwell 56.879°N 3.42°W, elevation: 933 m (3,061 ft), 1981–2010 normals
| Month | Jan | Feb | Mar | Apr | May | Jun | Jul | Aug | Sep | Oct | Nov | Dec | Year |
|---|---|---|---|---|---|---|---|---|---|---|---|---|---|
| Mean daily maximum °C (°F) | 0.2 (32.4) | −0.2 (31.6) | 0.9 (33.6) | 3.3 (37.9) | 7.1 (44.8) | 9.6 (49.3) | 11.6 (52.9) | 11.0 (51.8) | 8.6 (47.5) | 4.8 (40.6) | 2.3 (36.1) | 0.9 (33.6) | 5.0 (41.0) |
| Daily mean °C (°F) | −1.7 (28.9) | −2.3 (27.9) | −1.2 (29.8) | 0.8 (33.4) | 4.2 (39.6) | 6.8 (44.2) | 8.9 (48.0) | 8.5 (47.3) | 6.3 (43.3) | 3.0 (37.4) | 0.5 (32.9) | −1.2 (29.8) | 2.7 (36.9) |
| Mean daily minimum °C (°F) | −3.6 (25.5) | −4.4 (24.1) | −3.3 (26.1) | −1.7 (28.9) | 1.3 (34.3) | 3.9 (39.0) | 6.1 (43.0) | 6.0 (42.8) | 3.9 (39.0) | 1.1 (34.0) | −1.4 (29.5) | −3.2 (26.2) | 0.4 (32.7) |
Source: Met Office

== See also ==
- List of highest paved roads in Europe
- List of mountain passes
