= Glenshee Ski Centre =

Largest ski resort in Scotland

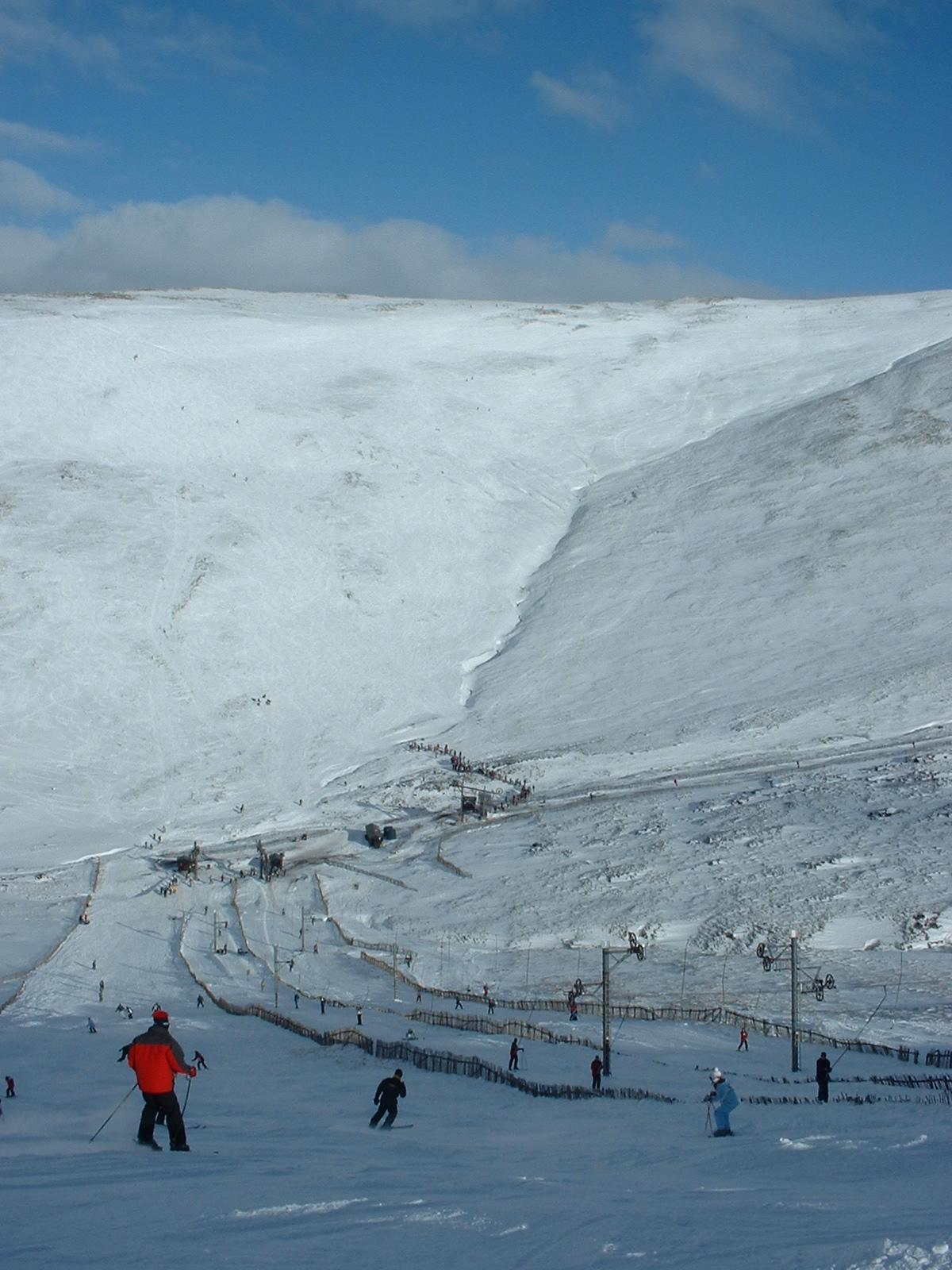
- Coire Fionn and Glas Maol Poma, Glenshee Ski Centre, Scotland
- Interactive map of Glenshee Ski Centre
- Location: Aberdeenshire
- Nearest city: Dundee 43 miles (69 km)
- Coordinates: 56°53′N 3°25′W
- Vertical: 1,372 ft (420 m)
- Top elevation: 3,504 ft (1,070 m)
- Base elevation: 2,132 ft (650 m)
- Skiable area: 2,000 acres (8.1 km^{2})
- Trails: 36 : 22% easiest : 36% more difficult : 36% difficult : 6% most difficult
- Longest run: 1.2 miles (1.9 km); Glas Maol
- Lift system: 22 - 3 Chairlifts, 16 Pomas and 3 T-Bars
- Lift capacity: 15,460 per hour
- Terrain parks: yes
- Snowmaking: yes
- Night skiing: occasional
- Website: Glenshee

Glenshee Ski Centre is an alpine snowsports area in the Scottish Highlands. It is located above the Cairnwell Pass at the head of Glen Shee on either side of the A93 road between Blairgowrie and Braemar. Glenshee is Britain's largest alpine snowsports area and is referred to as the 'Scottish Three Glens'. in reference to Les Trois Vallées. The ski area covers 2,000 acres (8.1 km^{2}).

22 lifts provide access to 25 miles (40 km) of pistes. There are 3 chairlifts, 3 T-bar lifts and 16 button lifts, mostly Pomas. A 4-seat chairlift is planned to replace the Cairnwell T-bar.

The pistes are spread across four mountains. The western side of the ski area is a large bowl encompassing The Cairnwell 3,061 ft (930 m) and Càrn Aosda 3,009 ft (920 m). The eastern side extends onto Meall Odhar 3,025 ft (920 m) and Glas Maol 3,504 ft (1,070 m). There are 8 green pistes; 13 blue; 13 red and 2 black including the 'Tiger', one of the steepest pistes in Scotland. The longest single run, Glas Maol, is 1.2 miles (1.9 km) and is considered by some to be amongst the best pistes in Scotland.

Extensive snow-making often allows the slopes to remain open in poor weather longer than other ski areas in Scotland. The ski area is served by panoramic webcams.
