= Loch Callater =

Callater loch
- Loch Callater
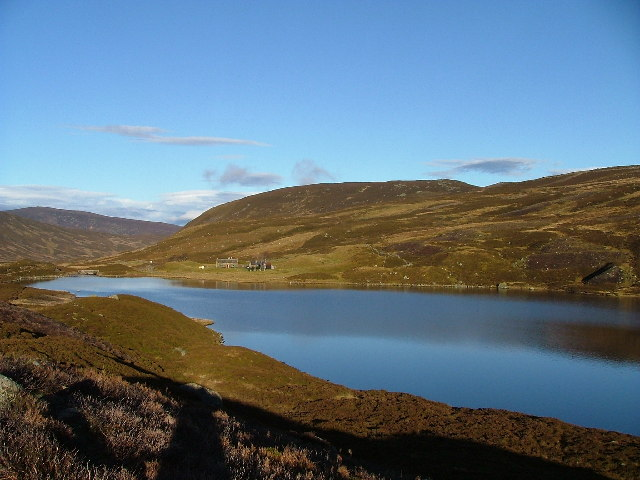
- Callater loch

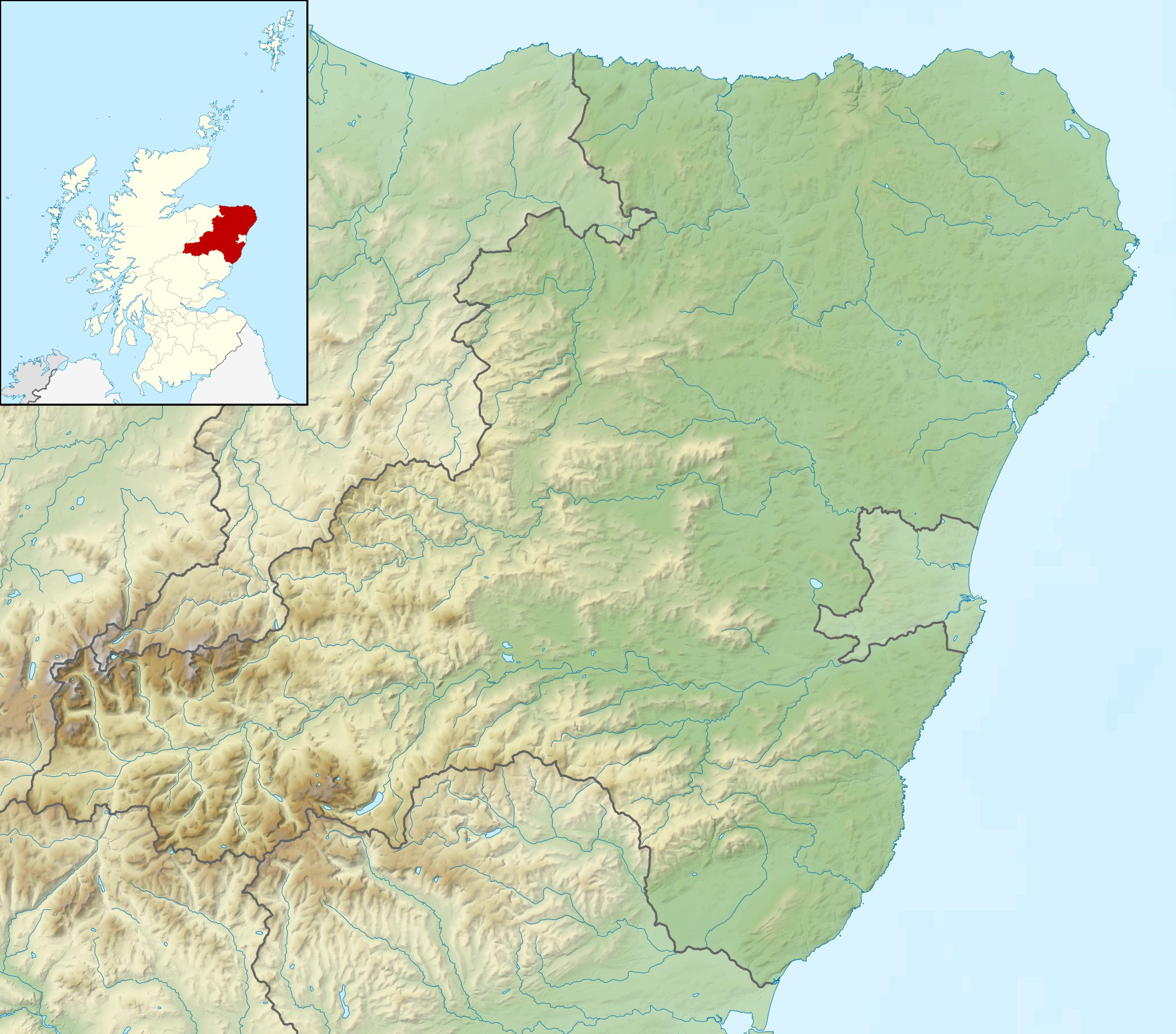
- Location within Aberdeenshire
- Location: Braemar, Scotland
- Coordinates: 56°56′23″N 3°20′37″W
- Type: freshwater loch
- Primary inflows: Allt an loch
- Primary outflows: Callater Burn
- Basin countries: Scotland
- Max. length: 1.6 km (1 mi)
- Max. width: 320 m (1,050 ft)
- Surface area: 30.9 ha (76 acres)
- Average depth: 3.7 m (12 ft)
- Max. depth: 9.1 m (30 ft)
- Water volume: 1,100,000 m^{3} (38,000,000 ft^{3})
- Shore length^{1}: 3.2 km (2.0 mi)
- Surface elevation: 501 m (1,644 ft)
- Islands: 0
- ^{1} Shore length is not a well-defined measure.

Loch Callater is an upland, freshwater loch lying approximately 5 miles (8 km) south of Braemar, Scotland. The loch trends in a northwest to southeast direction and is surrounded on both sides by steep hills. It is approximately 1.6 km (1 mi) in length.

The loch was surveyed on 11 July 1905 by T.N. Johnston and L.W. Collett and later charted as part of the Sir John Murray's Bathymetrical Survey of Fresh-Water Lochs of Scotland 1897-1909.

Trout, salmon, eels and perch are found in the loch. A permit is required for fishing.

The loch and surrounding area is popular with walkers and at the north end is the Callater Stable walkers' bothy.
