= Clunie Water =

River in Aberdeenshire, Scotland

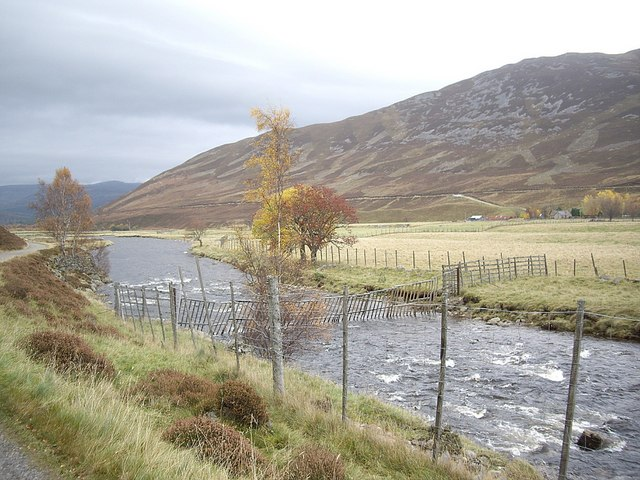
- A fence crossing the Clunie

Location
- Country: Scotland

Physical characteristics
- Mouth: River Dee
  - location: Braemar, Scotland
  - coordinates: 57°00′54″N 3°24′13″W

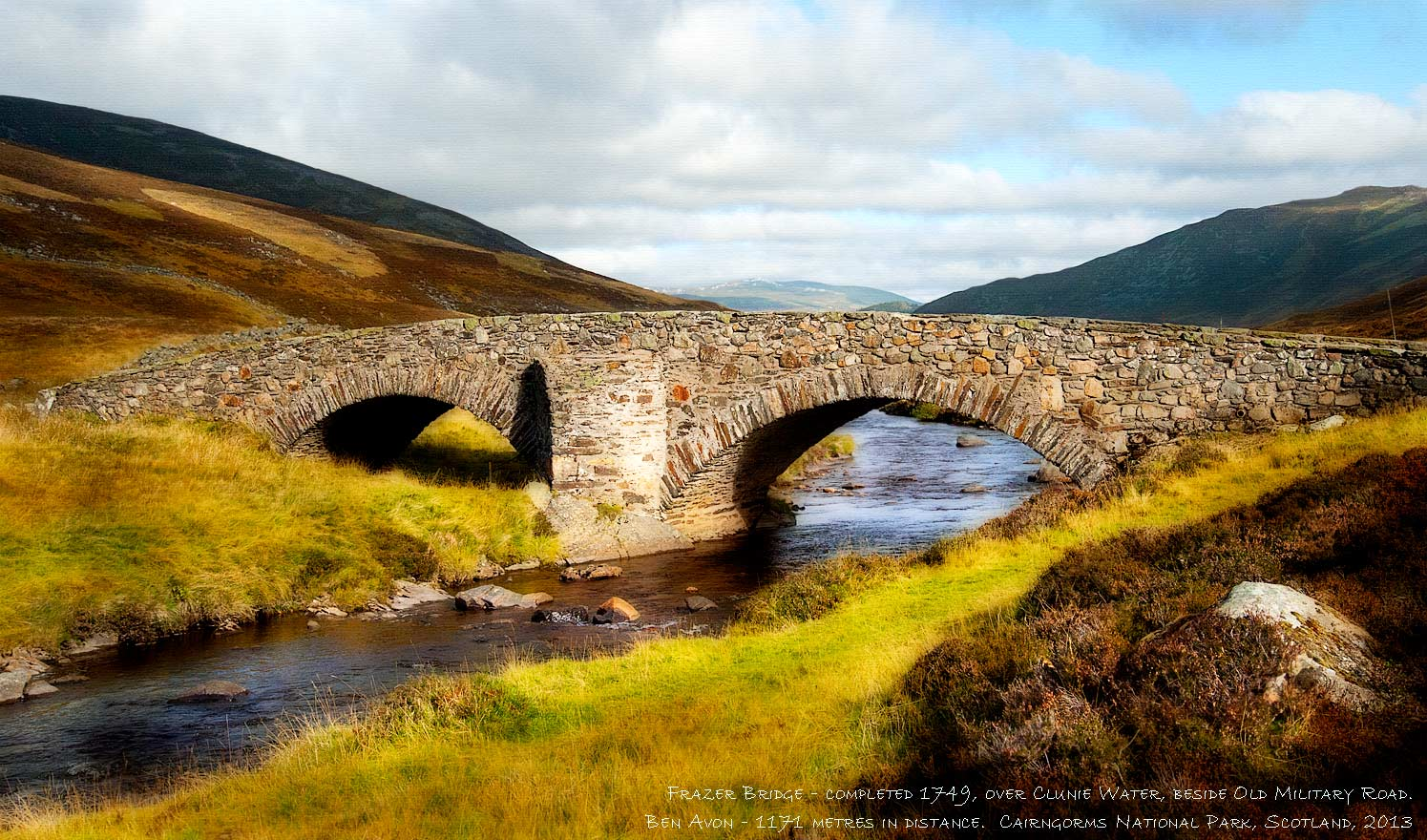
Fraser's Bridge

Clunie Water is a river of Aberdeenshire, Scotland. It is a tributary of the River Dee, joining the river at Braemar, among grey stone buildings. Callater Burn is a tributary of the Clunie; the confluence is at Auchallater. The river flows alongside the A93 road.

== Bridges and pathways ==
Further south of Auchallater in the Glen of Clunie is Fraser's Bridge, a 100 feet (30 m) long segmented arch bridge, measuring 15 ft 4 inches between its parapets. A Grade B listed building, it was completed in around 1749. On a 1776 Taylor and Skinner Map it was labelled "East Bridge".

In June 2010, a new 1,200 metres (3,900 ft) link path opened, leading from Highland Society Bridge over Clunie Water to the Glenshee Road.

== Fishing ==
During the fishing season, from March to September, permits are granted for fishing brown trout along the river.
