= List of Munros in Scotland by Section =

Scottish peaks above 3,000 ft laid out per Munro's Tables

Sections of Munro's Tables
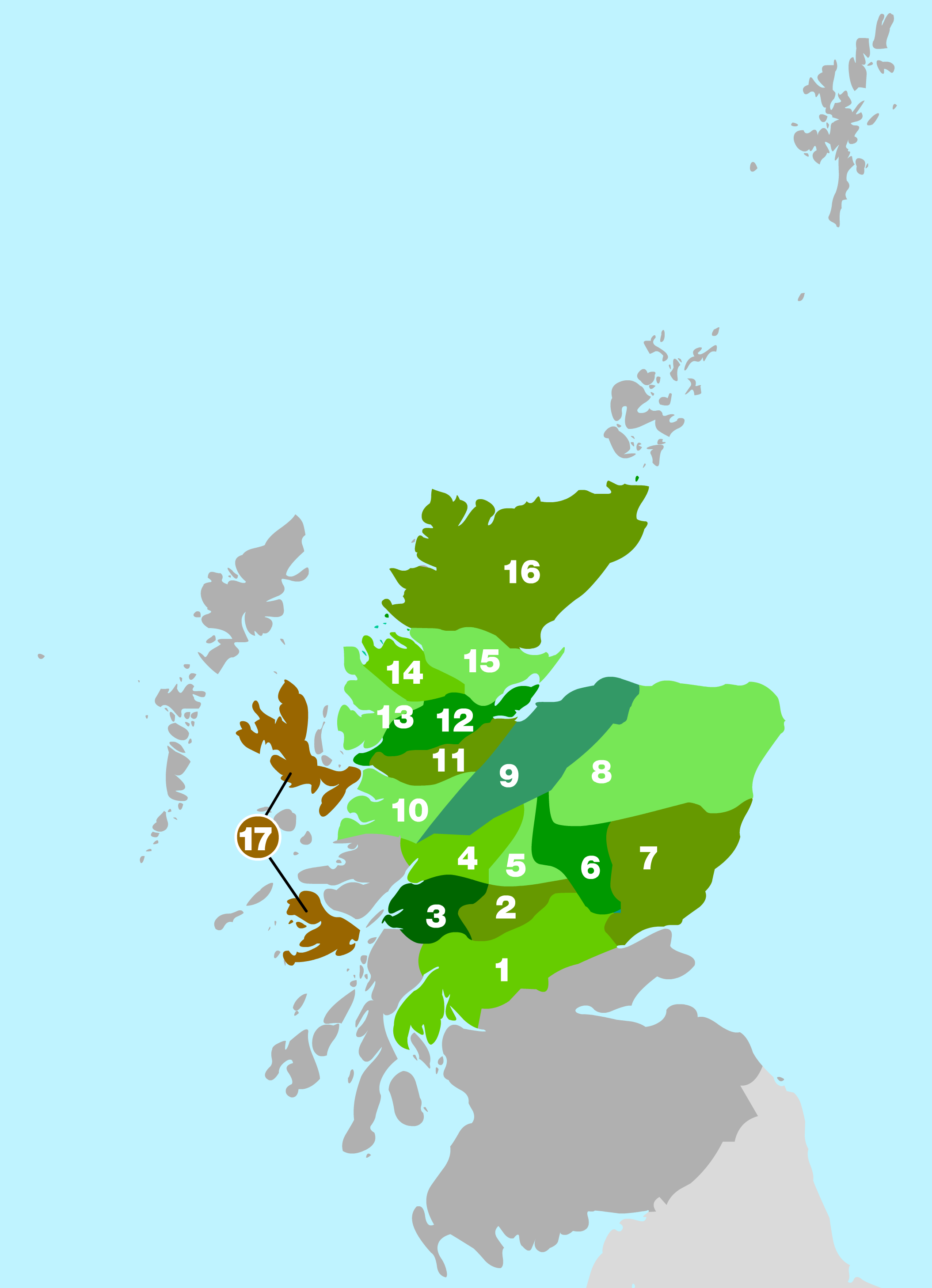
- The approximate divisions of Scotland used in the Scottish Mountaineering Club's, Munro's Tables

Highest point
- Elevation: Metres
- Prominence: no requirement

Geography
- Location: 282 Munros Scotland
- Parent range: w

As of June 2019, this is the list of the 282 Munros, recognised by the Scottish Mountaineering Club ("SMC") and The Munro Society. The Munros are listed by "Section" per the Munro's Tables, and in descending order of height within each section. Hills are divided by sub-region, and hills with less than 200 m (656 ft) relative height (or prominence) are indented. The term Real Munro is used for hills with a prominence above 150 m (492 ft), which is the threshold for a Marilyn. For a single table of all 282 Munros, or all 226 Munro Tops, ranked by height and by prominence, see the "List of Munro mountains in Scotland".

== Section one: Firth of Clyde to Strathtay ==
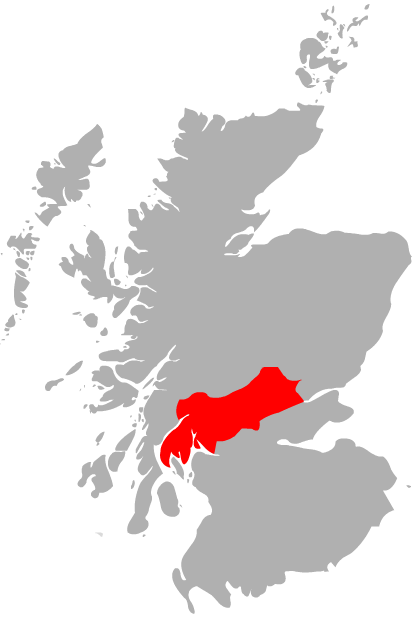

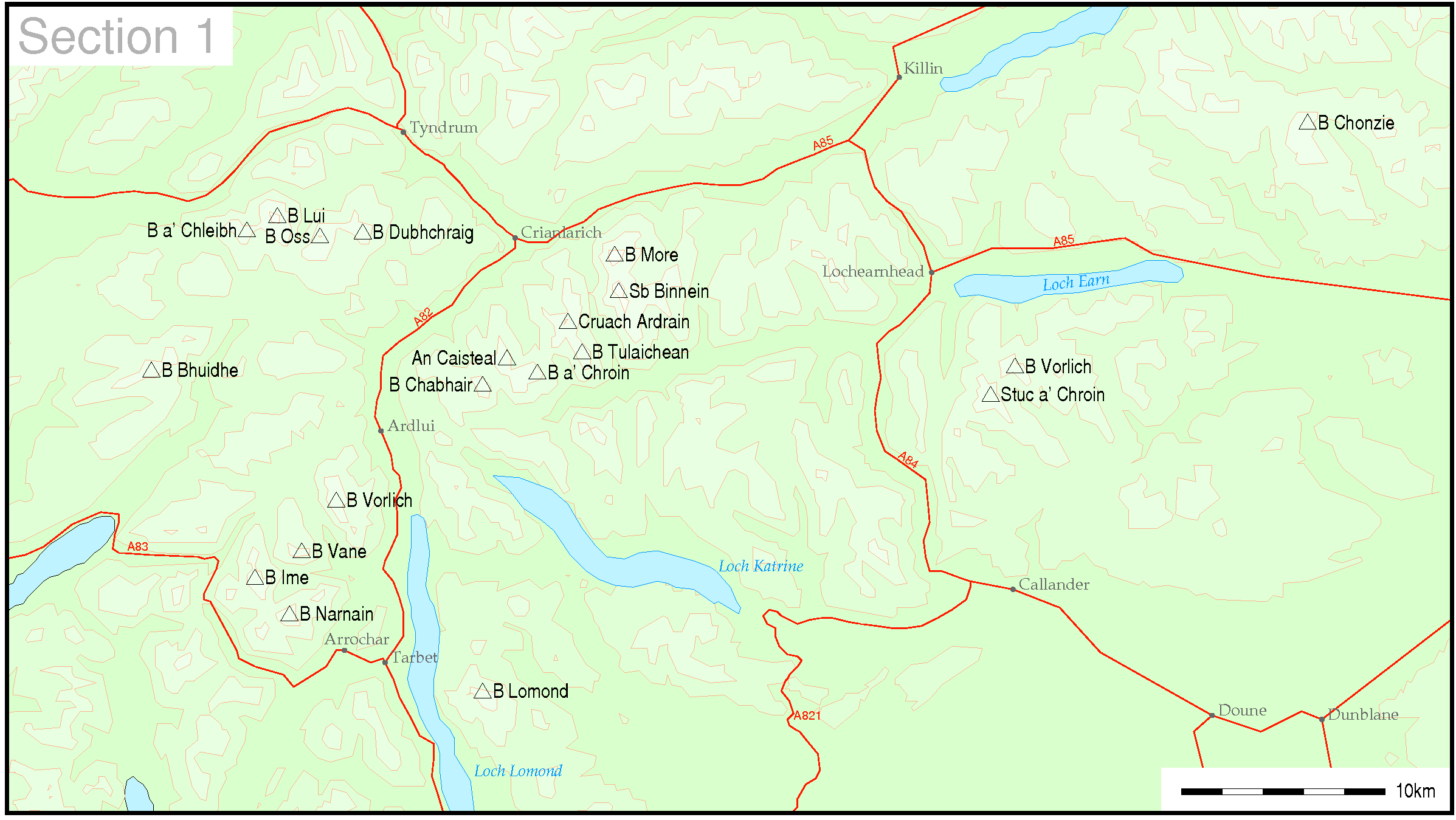

Height Rank	Prom. Rank	Name	Gaelic Name	Pronunciation	Translate	Munro Since	Parent	Section / Region	County	Height (m)	Prom. (m)	Height (ft)	Prom. (ft)	Topo Map	OS Grid Reference	Classification (§ DoBIH codes)
249	44	Ben Chonzie	Beinn a' Chòinnich	[ˈpeiɲ ə ˈxɔːɲɪç]	mountain of the moss	1891	Ben More	01A: Loch Tay to Perth	Perth and Kinross	931	648	3,054	2,126	51 52	NN773308	Ma,M,Sim
165	19	Ben Vorlich	Beinn Mhùrlaig	[peɲ ˈvuːrˠl̪ˠɛkʲ]	hill of the bay	1891	Ben More	01B: Strathyre to Strathallan	Perth and Kinross	985	834	3,232	2,736	57	NN629189	Ma,M,Sim
180	137	Stùc a' Chroin	Stùc a' Chroin	[ˈs̪t̪uːxk ə ˈxɾɔɲ]	the peak of the danger	1891	Ben Vorlich	01B: Strathyre to Strathallan	Perth and Kinross/Stirling	975	252	3,199	827	57	NN617174	Ma,M,Sim
16	4	Ben More	A' Bheinn Mhòr	[ə ˈveiɲ ˈvoːɾ]	the big mountain	1891	Ben Nevis	01C: Loch Lomond to Strathyre	Stirling	1174	986	3,852	3,235	51	NN432244	Ma,M,Sim,CoU,CoA
18	120	Stob Binnein	Stob Binnein	[ˈs̪t̪op ˈpiɲɛɲ]	conical peak	1891	Ben More	01C: Loch Lomond to Strathyre	Stirling	1165	303	3,822	994	51	NN435228	Ma,M,Sim
87	64	Cruach Ardrain	Cruach Àrdrain	[ˈkʰɾuəx ˈaːrˠt̪ɾɛɲ]	stack of the high part	1891	Ben More	01C: Loch Lomond to Strathyre	Stirling	1045.9	549	3,431	1,801	51 56	NN409212	Ma,M,Sim
222	235	Beinn Tulaichean	Beinn Thulaichean	[ˈpeiɲ ˈhul̪ˠɪçən]	mountain of hillocks	1891	Cruach Ardrain	01C: Loch Lomond to Strathyre	Stirling	945.8	122	3,103	400	56	NN416196	Hu,M,Sim
147	76	An Caisteal	An Caisteal	[əŋ ˈkʰaʃtʲəl̪ˠ]	the castle	1891	Cruach Ardrain	01C: Loch Lomond to Strathyre	Stirling	995.8	473	3,267	1,552	50 56	NN378193	Ma,M,Sim

1c. Loch Lomond to Strathyre

- Beinn a' Chroin (941.4 m) Gaelic: Beinn a' Chroin [peɲ ə ˈxɾɔɲ]
- Ben Lomond (974 m) Gaelic: Beinn Laomainn [peɲ ˈl̪ˠɯːmɪɲ]
- Beinn Chabhair (932.1 m) Gaelic: Beinn a' Chabhair [ˈpeiɲ ə ˈxavɪɾʲ]

1d. Inveraray to Crianlarich

- Ben Lui (1130 m) Gaelic: Beinn Laoigh [peɲ ˈl̪ˠɤj]
  - Beinn a' Chleibh (916.3 m) Gaelic: Beinn a' Chlèibh [ˈpeiɲ ə ˈxleːv]
- Ben Oss (1029 m) Gaelic: Beinn Ois [peɲ ˈɔʃ]
  - Beinn Dubhchraig (978 m) Gaelic: Beinn Dubh-chreig [peɲ ˈt̪uxɾʲekʲ]
- Beinn Ìme (1011 m) Gaelic: Beinn Ime [peɲ ˈimə]
- Beinn Bhuidhe (948.5 m) Gaelic: A' Bheinn Bhuidhe [ə ˈveiɲ ˈvujə]
- Ben Vorlich (943 m) Gaelic: Beinn Mhùrlaig [peɲ ˈvuːrˠl̪ˠɛkʲ]
- Beinn Narnain (927 m) Gaelic: Beinn Nàrnain [ˈpe ˈn̪ˠaːrˠnɛɲ]
- Ben Vane (915.76 m) Gaelic: A' Bheinn Mheadhain [ə ˈveiɲ ˈviə.ɛɲ]

== Section two: Loch Rannoch to Loch Tay ==
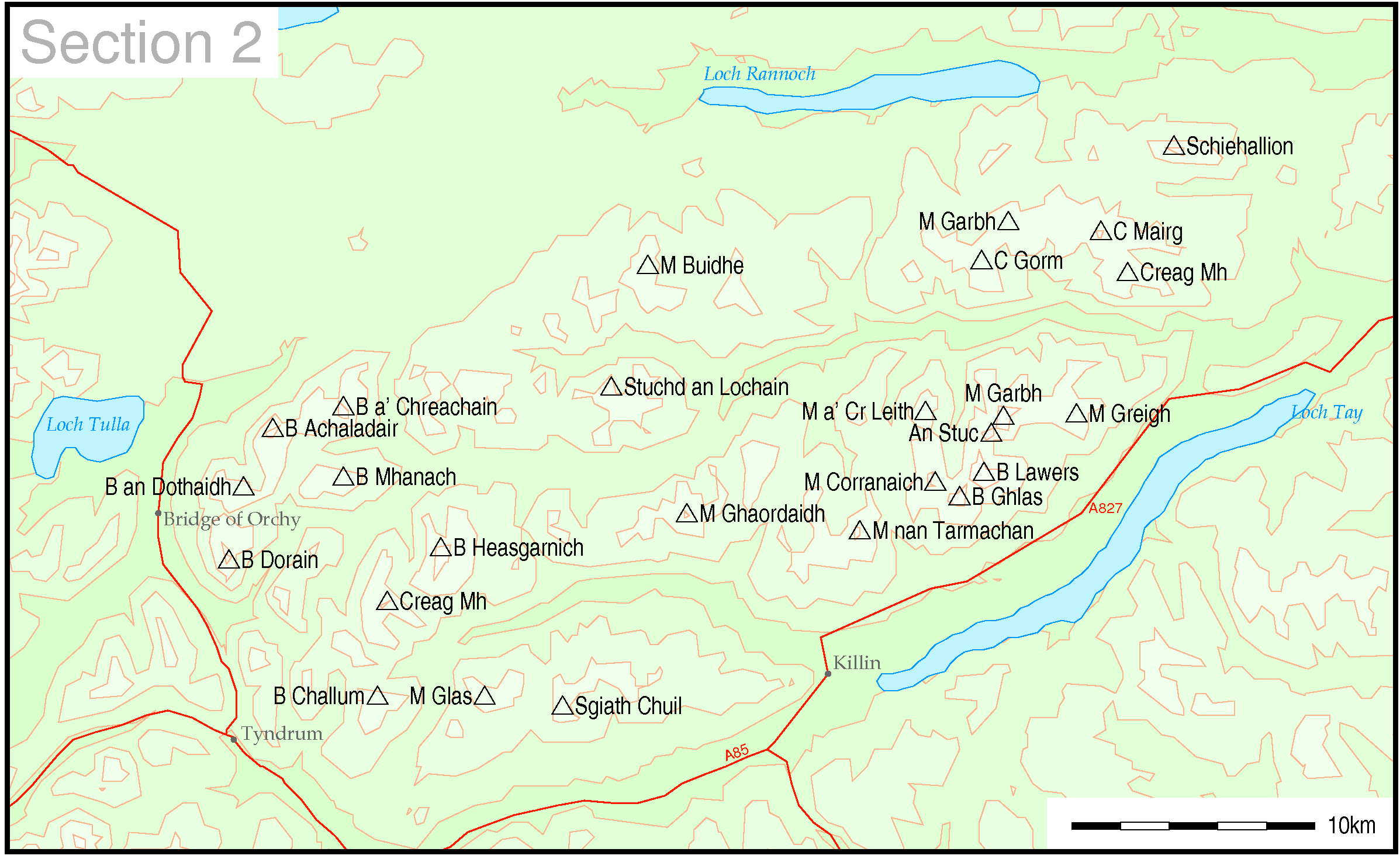

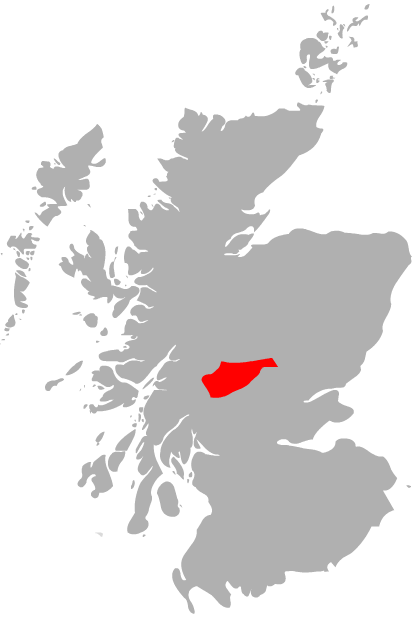

2a. Loch Rannoch to Glen Lyon

- Schiehallion (1083 m)
- Beinn a' Chreachain (1080.6 m)
- Beinn Dorain (1076 m)
- Càrn Mairg (1042 m)
  - Càrn Gorm (1029 m)
  - Meall nan Aighean (981 m)
  - Meall Garbh (Càrn Mairg Group) (968 m)
- Beinn Achaladair (1038.5 m)
- Beinn an Dothaidh (1004 m)
- Stuchd an Lochain (960 m)
- Beinn Mhanach (953 m)
- Meall Buidhe (932.1 m)

2b. Glen Lyon to Glen Dochart and Loch Tay

- Ben Lawers (1214 m)
  - An Stùc (1117.1 m)
  - Meall Garbh (Lawers Group) (1123.1 m)
  - Beinn Ghlas (1103 m)
  - Meall Greigh (1001 m)
- Beinn Heasgarnich (1077.4 m)
- Meall Corranaich (1069 m)
  - Meall a' Choire Leith (925.6 m)
- Creag Mhòr (1047 m)
- Meall nan Tarmachan (1043.5 m)
- Meall Ghaordaidh (1039.8 m)
- Ben Challum (1025 m)
- Meall Glas (959 m)
- Sgiath Chuil (920 m)

== Section three: Loch Leven to Connel Bridge and Glen Lochy ==
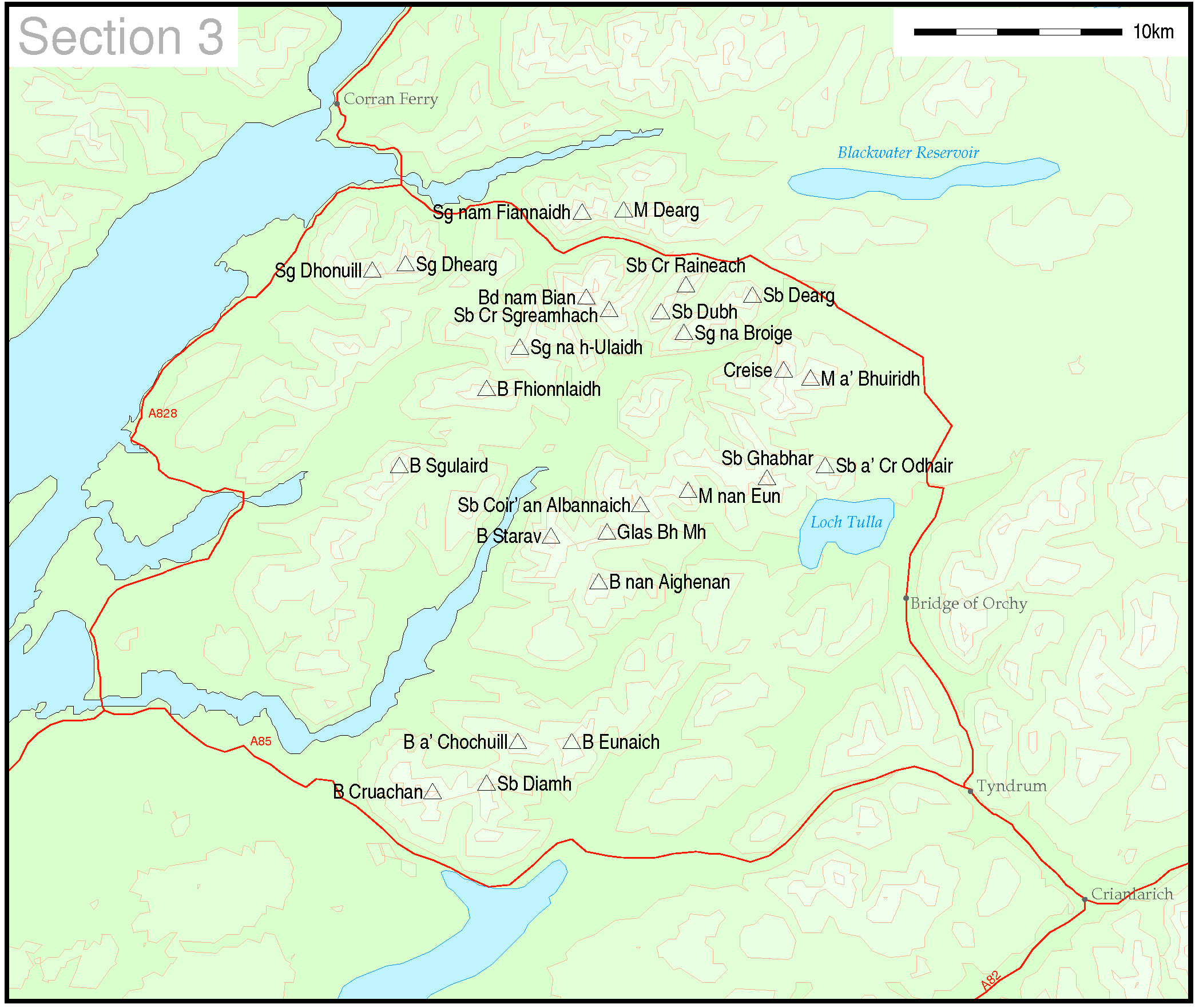

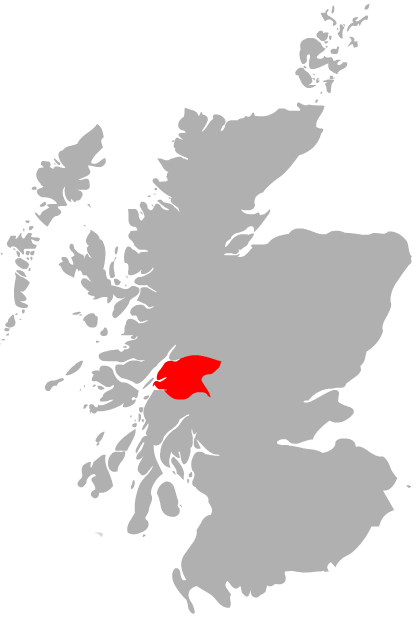

3a. Loch Leven to Rannoch Station

- Aonach Eagach - Sgor nam Fiannaidh (967.7 m)
  - Meall Dearg (952.2 m)

3b. Loch Linnhe to Loch Etive

- Bidean nam Bian (1149.4 m)
  - Stob Coire Sgreamhach (1072 m)
- Beinn a' Bheithir - Sgorr Dhearg (1024 m)
  - Sgorr Dhonuill (1001 m)
- Buachaille Etive Mòr - Stob Dearg (1021.4 m)
  - Sgor na Bròige (953.4 m)
- Sgùrr na h-Ulaidh (994 m)
- Beinn Fhionnlaidh (959 m)
- Buachaille Etive Beag - Stob Dubh (958 m)
  - Stob Coire Raineach (925 m)
- Beinn Sgulaird (937 m)

3c. Glen Etive to Glen Lochy

- Ben Cruachan (1127 m)
  - Stob Diamh (999.2 m)
- Meall a' Bhùiridh (1107.9 m)
  - Creise (1099.8 m)
- Stob Ghabhar (1090 m)
- Ben Starav (1078 m)
- Stob Coir' an Albannaich (1044 m)
  - Meall nan Eun (928 m)
- Glas Bheinn Mhòr (997 m)
- Beinn Eunaich (989 m)
- Beinn a' Chochuill (980 m)
- Beinn nan Aighenan (960 m)
- Stob a' Choire Odhair (945 m)

== Section four: Fort William to Loch Ericht ==
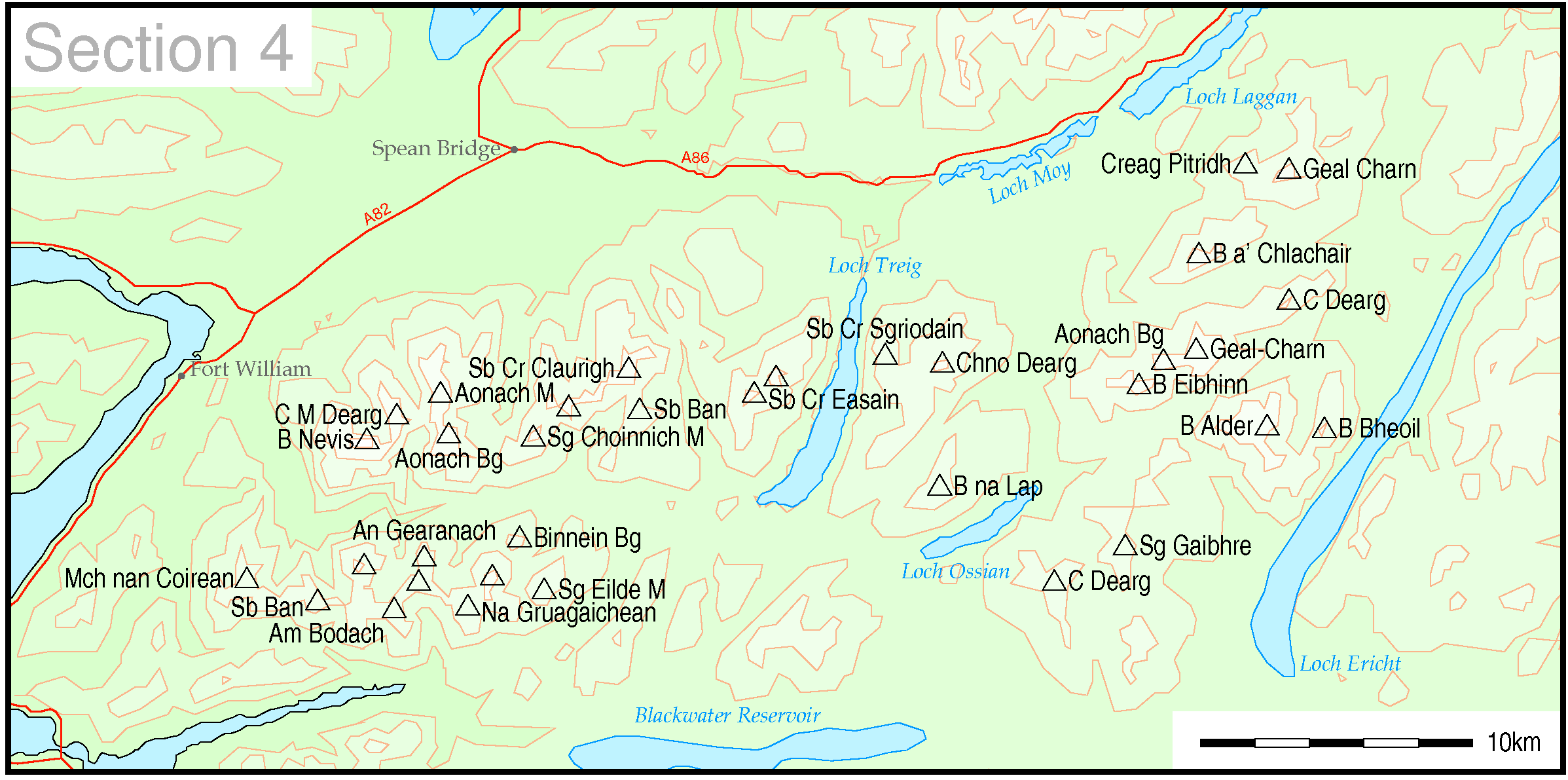

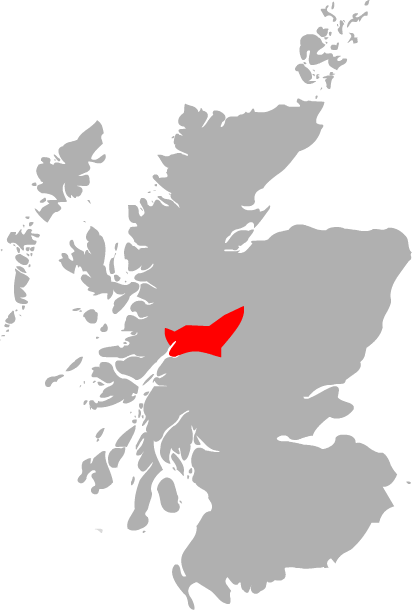

4a. Fort William to Loch Treig

- Ben Nevis (1345 m)
  - Càrn Mòr Dearg (1220 m)
- Aonach Beag (1234 m)
  - Aonach Mòr (1221 m)
- Stob Choire Claurigh (1177 m)
  - Stob Coire an Laoigh (1116 m)
  - Sgùrr Choinnich Mòr (1094 m)
  - Stob Bàn (977 m)
- Stob Coire Easain (1115 m)
  - Stob a' Choire Mheadhoin (1105 m)

4b. The Mamores

- Binnein Mòr (1130 m)
  - Na Gruagaichean (1054.2 m)
  - Binnein Beag (943 m)
- Sgùrr a' Mhàim (1099 m)
  - Am Bodach (1031.8 m)
  - An Gearanach (981.4 m)
  - Stob Coire a' Chàirn (981.4 m)
- Sgùrr Eilde Mòr (1010 m)
- Stob Bàn (999.7 m)
  - Mullach nan Coirean (939.3 m)

4c. Loch Treig to Loch Ericht

- Ben Alder (1148 m)
  - Beinn Bheòil (1019 m)
- Geal-Chàrn (1132 m)
  - Aonach Beag (1115.8 m)
  - Beinn Eibhinn (1103.2 m)
  - Càrn Dearg (1034 m)
- Beinn a' Chlachair (1087 m)
- Geal Charn (1049 m)
  - Creag Pitridh (924 m)
- Chno Dearg (1046 m)
  - Stob Coire Sgriodain (979 m)
- Sgor Gaibhre (955 m)
- Càrn Dearg (941 m)
- Beinn na Lap (935 m)

== Section five: Loch Ericht to Glen Tromie and Glen Garry ==
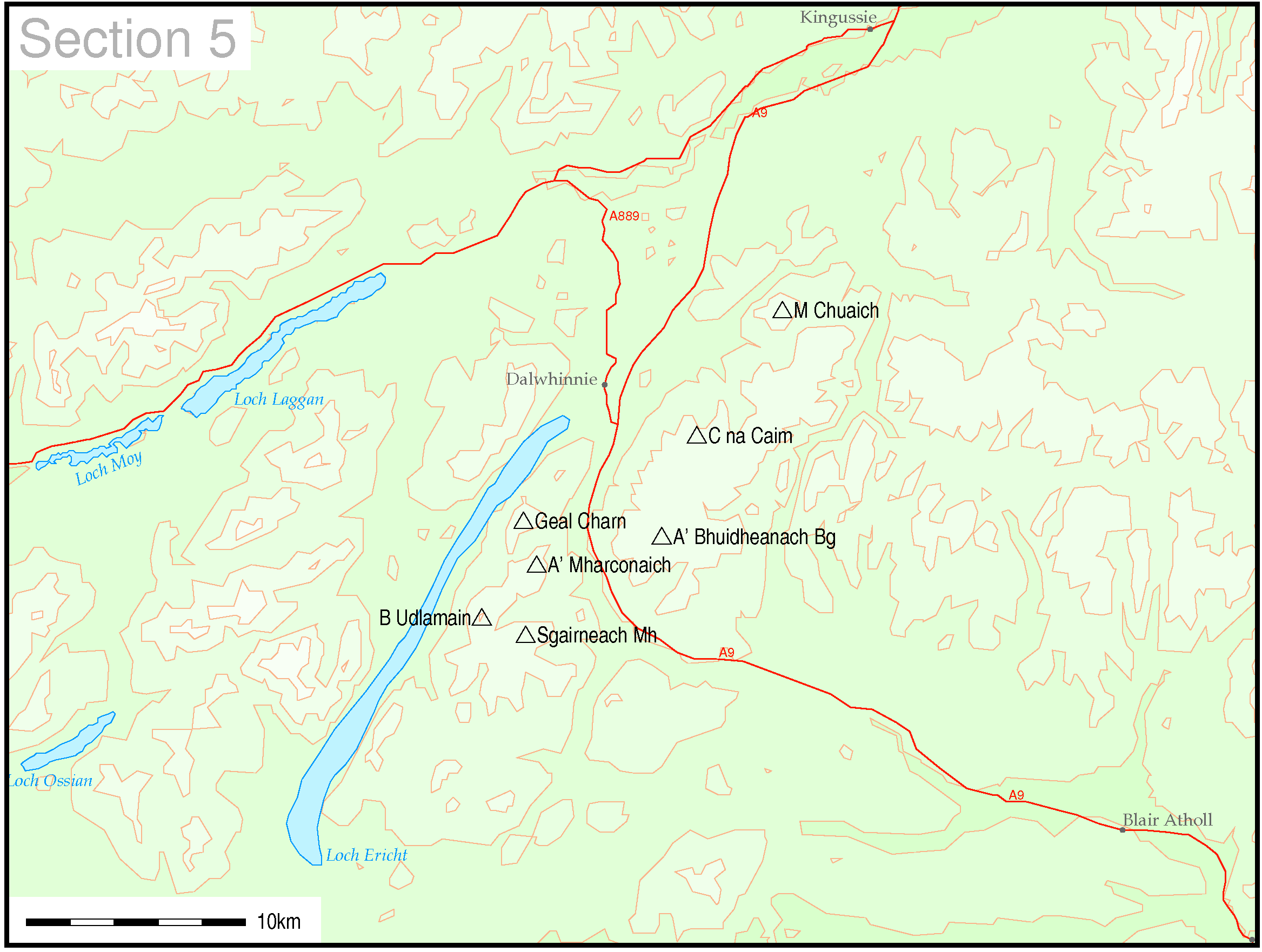

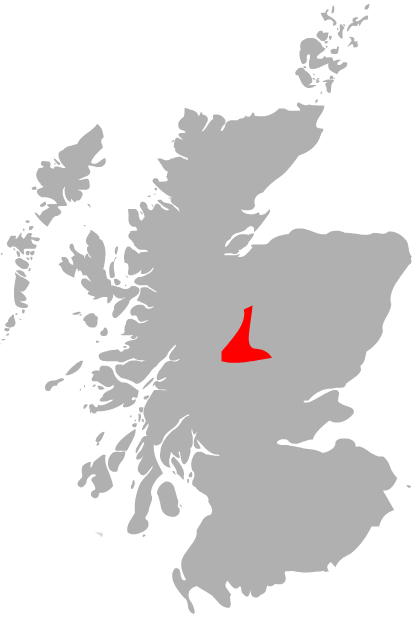

5a. Loch Ericht to Glen Garry

- Beinn Udlamain (1010.2 m)
  - Sgairneach Mhòr (991 m)
  - Geal-chàrn (917.1 m)
  - A' Mharconaich (973.2 m)

5b. Glen Garry to Gaick Pass

- Meall Chuaich (951 m)
- Càrn na Caim (940.8 m)
  - A' Bhuidheanach Bheag (936 m)

== Section six: Forest of Atholl to Braemar and Blairgowrie ==
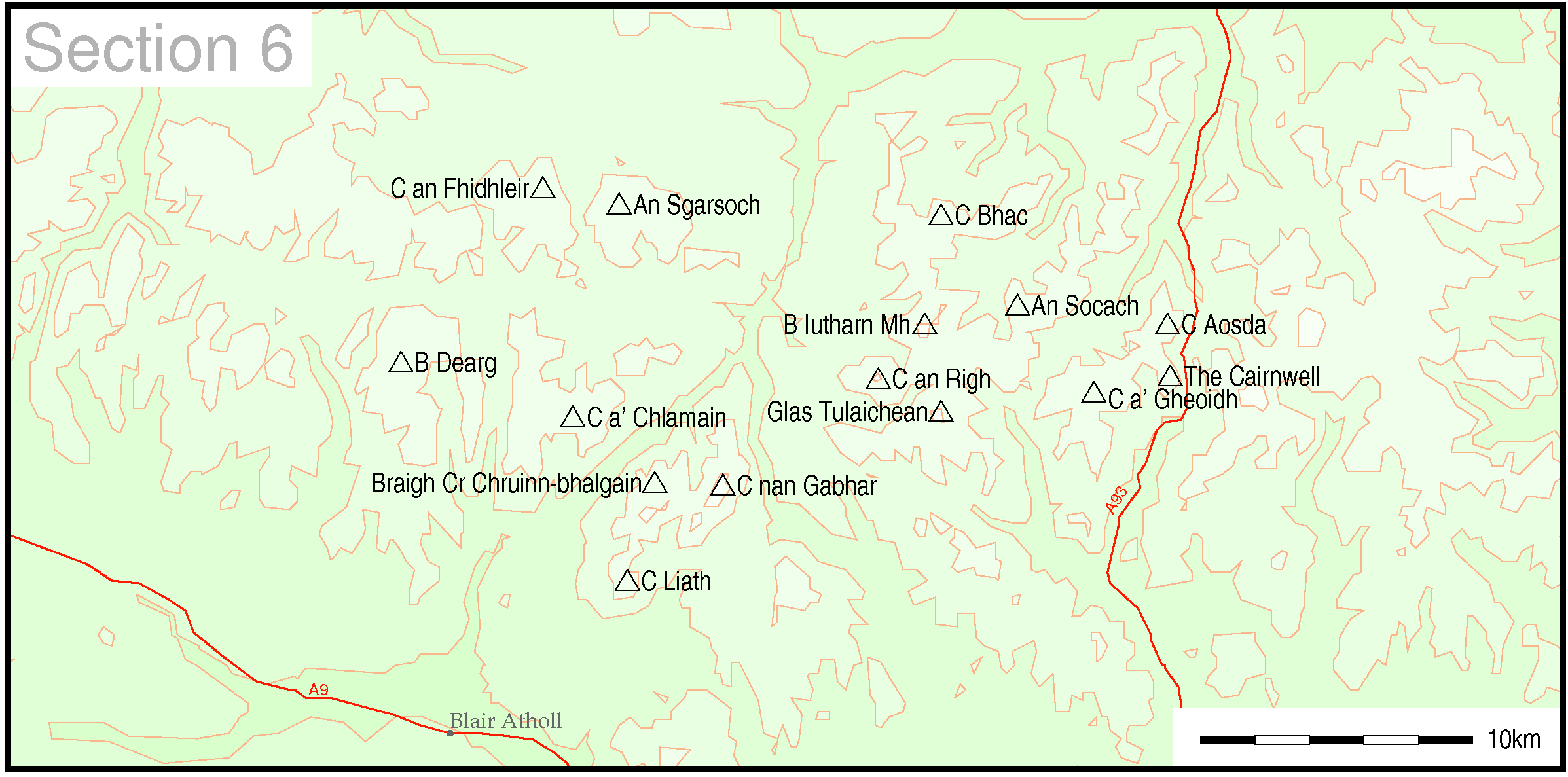

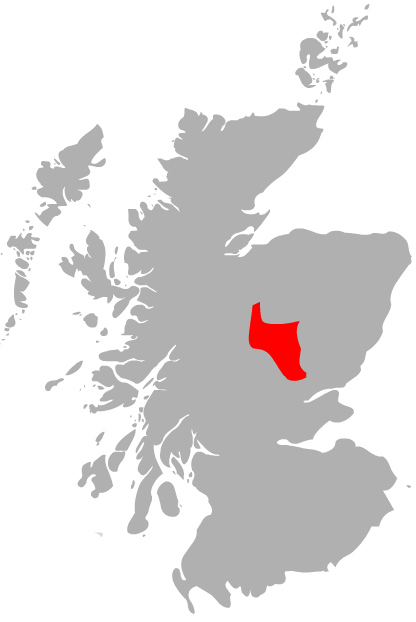

6a. Glen Tromie to Glen Tilt

- Beinn Dearg (1008.7 m)
- An Sgarsoch (1006.5 m)
- Càrn an Fhidhleir (994 m)
- Càrn a' Chlamhain (963.5 m)

6b. Pitlochry to Braemar and Blairgowrie

- Beinn a' Ghlò - Càrn nan Gabhar (1121.9 m)
- Bràigh Coire Chruinn-bhalgain (1070 m)
- Glas Tulaichean (1051 m)
- Beinn Iutharn Mhòr (1045 m)
  - Càrn Bhac (945.1 m)
  - An Socach (944 m)
- Càrn an Rìgh (1029 m)
- Càrn Liath (976 m)
- Càrn a' Gheòidh (975 m)
  - The Cairnwell (933 m)
  - Carn Aosda (915.3 m)

== Section seven: Braemar to Montrose ==
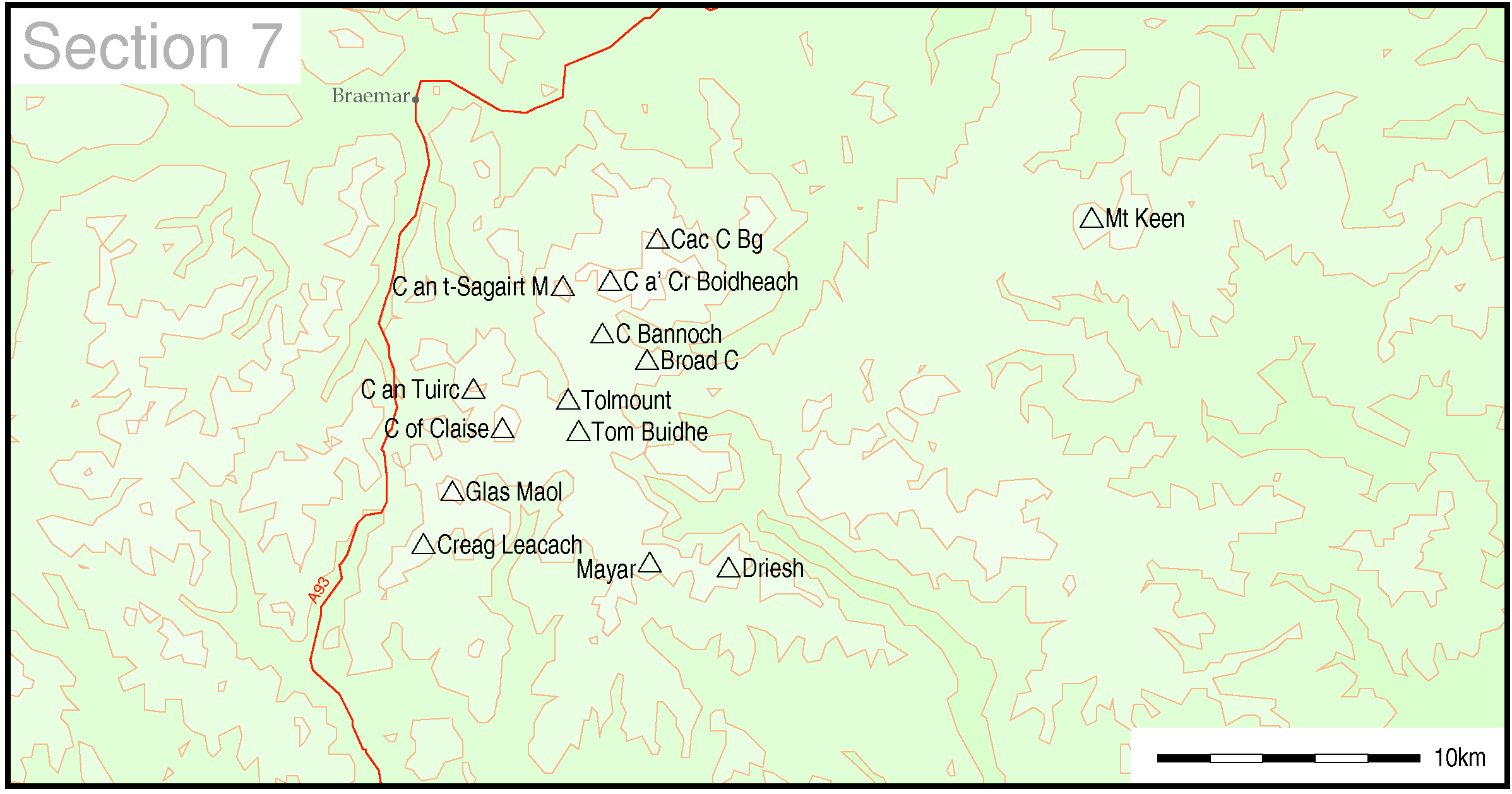

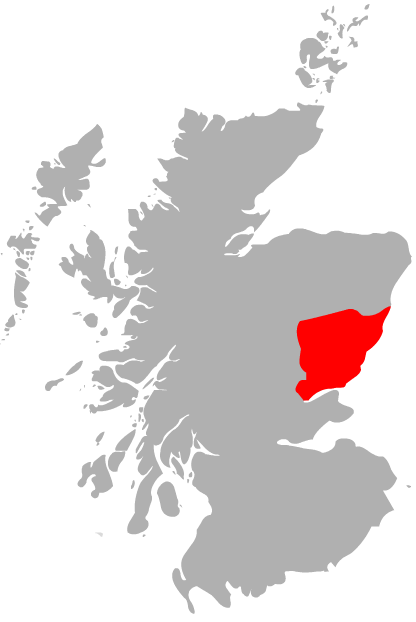

- Lochnagar (1156 m)
  - Càrn a' Coire Boidheach (1109.9 m)
  - Glas Maol (1068 m)
  - Cairn of Claise (1064 m)
  - Càrn an t-Sagairt Mòr (1047 m)
  - Càrn an Tuirc (1019 m)
  - Cairn Bannoch (1012 m)
  - Broad Cairn (998 m)
  - Creag Leacach (988.2 m)
  - Tolmount (958 m)
  - Tom Buidhe (957 m)
  - Driesh (947 m)
  - Mayar (928 m)
- Mount Keen (939 m)

== Section eight: The Cairngorms ==
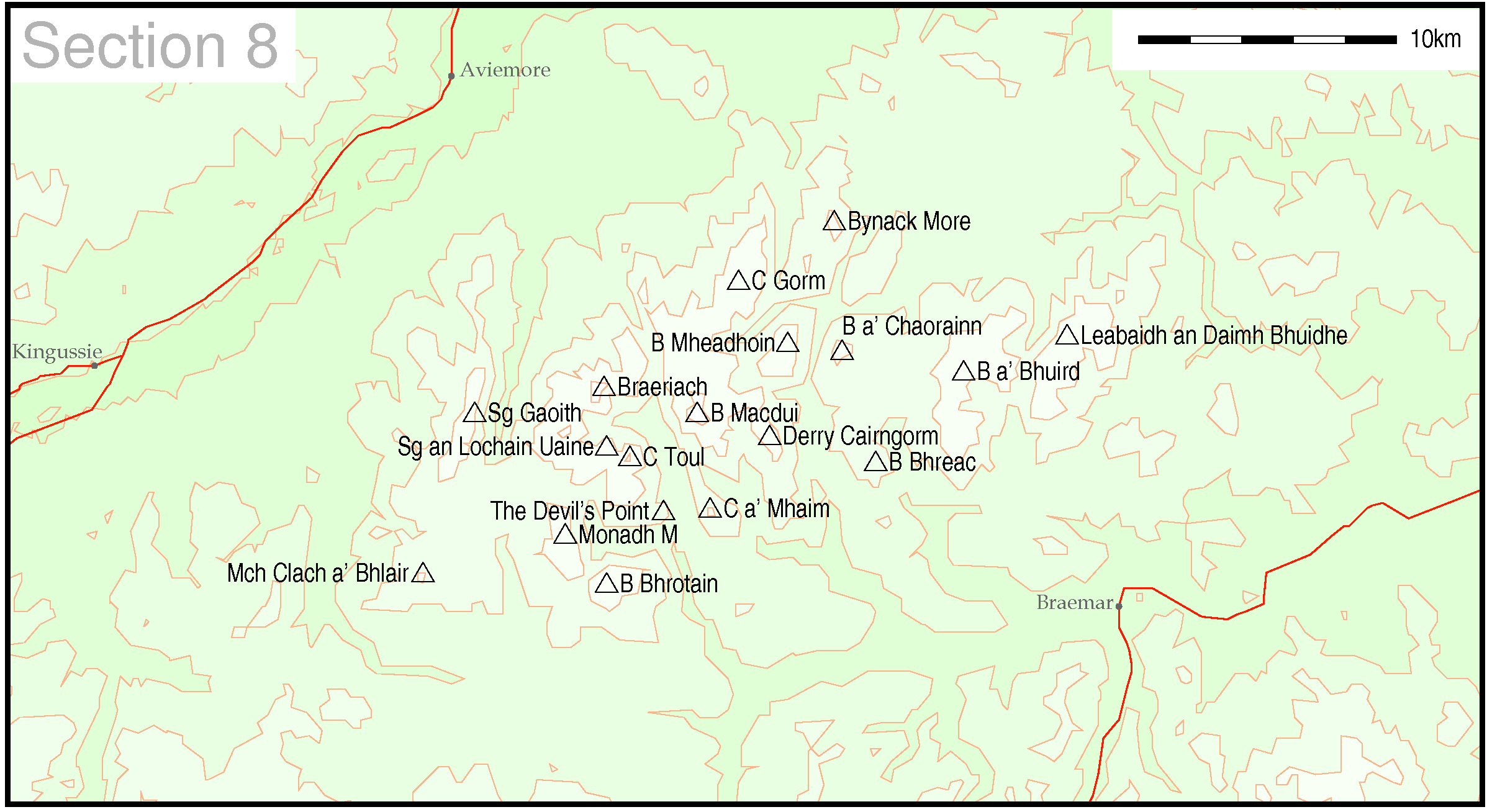

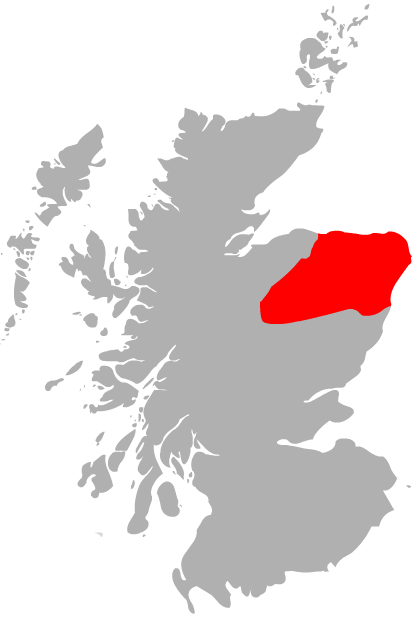

- Ben Macdui (1309 m)
  - Cairn Gorm (1244.8 m)
  - Derry Cairngorm (1155 m)
- Braeriach (1296 m)
  - Cairn Toul (1291 m)
  - Sgor an Lochain Uaine (1258 m)
  - The Devil's Point (1004 m)
- Beinn a' Bhùird (1197 m)
  - Ben Avon - Leabaidh an Daimh Bhuidhe (1171 m)
- Beinn Mheadhoin (1182.9 m)
- Beinn Bhrotain (1157 m)
  - Monadh Mòr (1113 m)
- Sgor Gaoith (1118 m)
  - Mullach Clach a' Bhlàir (1019 m)
- Bynack More (1090 m)
- Beinn a' Chaorainn (Cairngorms) (1083 m)
  - Beinn Bhreac (931 m)
- Càrn a' Mhàim (1037 m)

== Section nine: Spean Bridge to Elgin ==
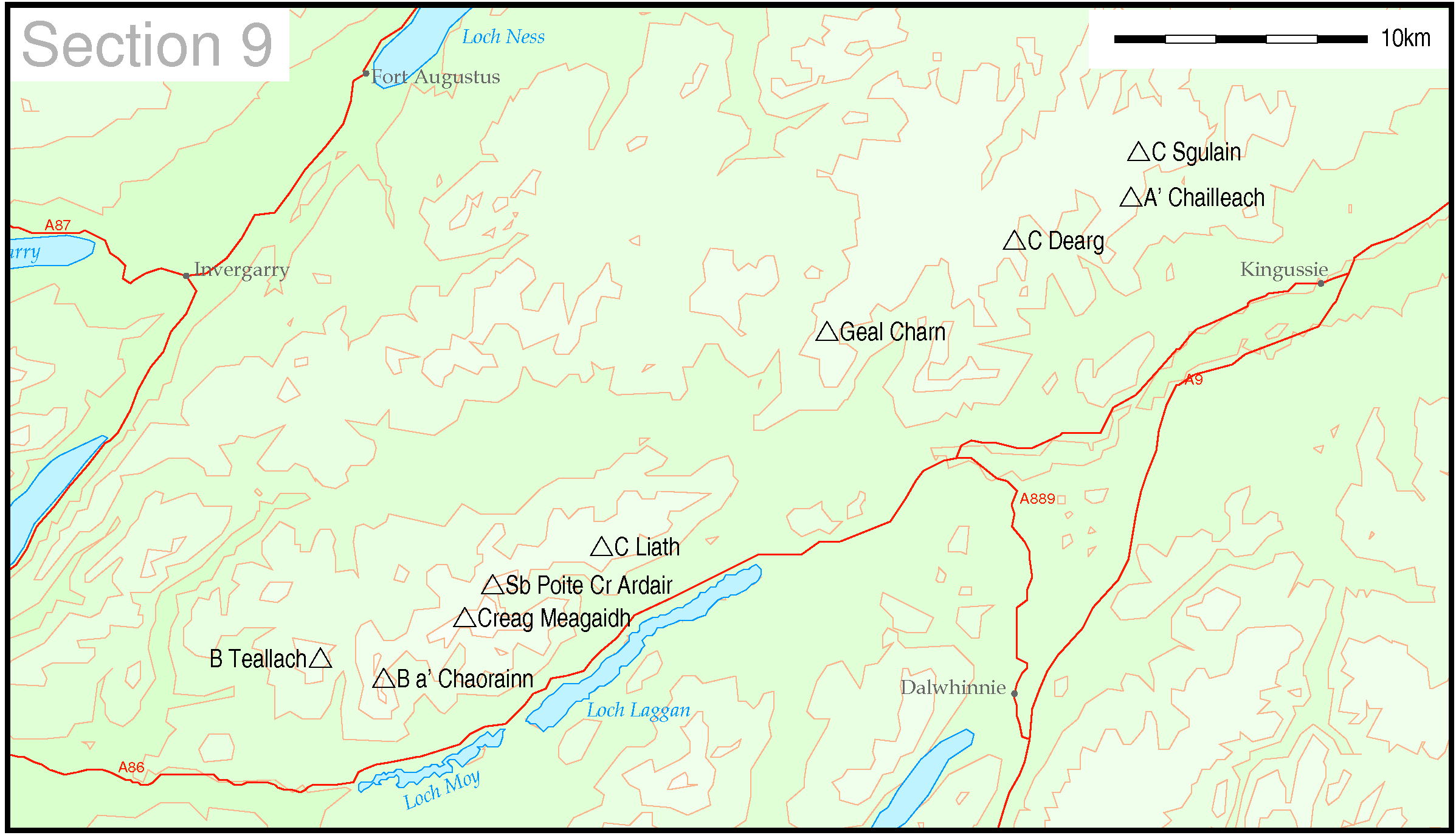

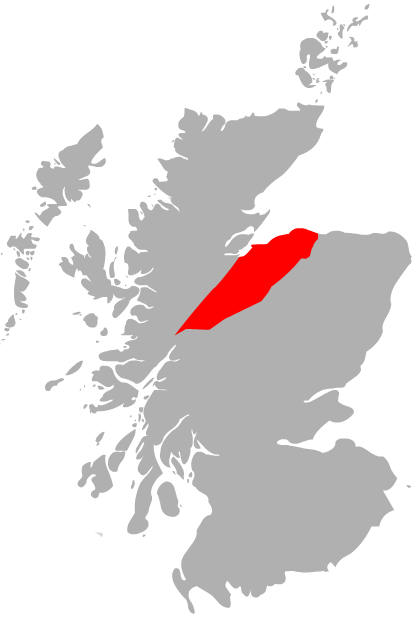

9a. The Monadh Liath

- Càrn Dearg (945.7 m)
  - A' Chailleach (929.2 m)
  - Geal Chàrn (926 m)
  - Càrn Sgulain (920.3 m)

9b. Loch Lochy to Loch Laggan

- Creag Meagaidh (1128 m)
  - Stob Poite Coire Ardair (1054 m)
  - Càrn Liath (1006 m)
- Beinn a' Chaorainn (1052 m)
- Beinn Teallach (914.6 m)

== Section ten: Glen Shiel to Glenfinnan ==
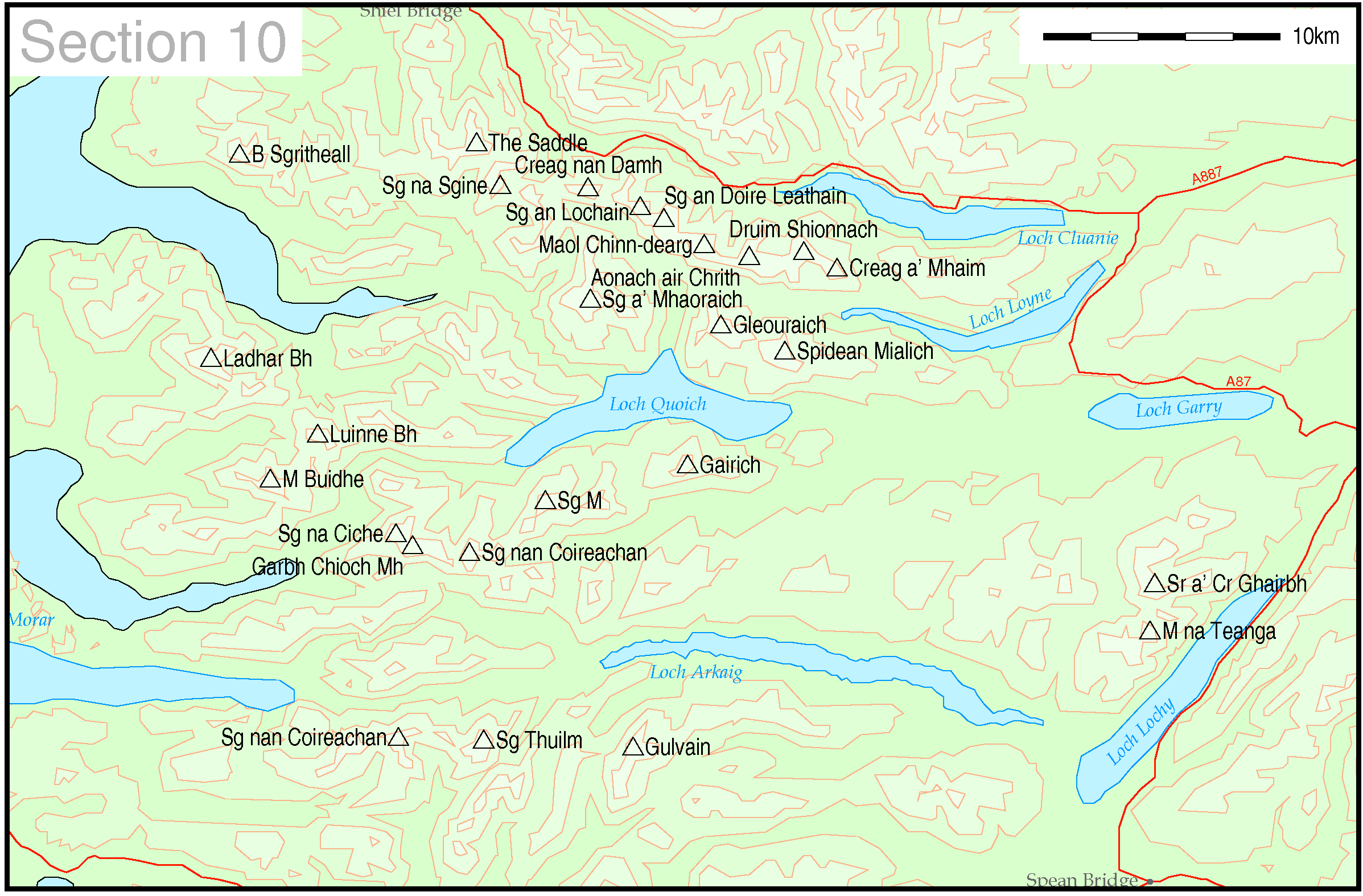

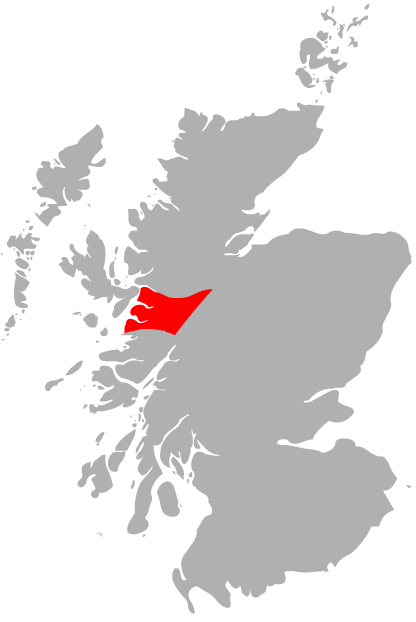

10a. Glen Shiel to Loch Hourn and Glen Quoich

- Gleouraich (1035 m)
- Sgùrr a' Mhaoraich (1027 m)
- Aonach air Chrith (1019.5 m)
  - Sgùrr an Doire Leathain (1010 m)
  - Sgùrr an Lochain (1004 m)
  - Druim Shionnach (987 m)
  - Maol Chinn-dearg (980.3 m)
  - Creag a' Mhaim (946 m)
  - Creag nan Damh (917.2 m)
- The Saddle (1011.4 m)
- Spidean Mialach (996 m)
- Beinn Sgritheall (974 m)
- Sgùrr na Sgine (946 m)

10b. Knoydart to Glen Kingie

- Sgùrr na Cìche (1040 m)
  - Garbh Chioch Mhòr (1013 m)
- Ladhar Bheinn (1020 m)
- Sgùrr Mòr (1003 m)
- Sgùrr nan Coireachan (956 m)
- Meall Buidhe (946 m)
- Luinne Bheinn (939 m)
- Gairich (919 m)

10c. Loch Arkaig to Glen Moriston

- Sròn a' Choire Ghairbh (937 m)
- Meall na Teanga (916.8 m)

10d. Mallaig to Fort William

- Gaor Bheinn or Gulvain (987 m)
- Sgùrr Thuilm (963 m)
- Sgùrr nan Coireachan (956 m)

== Section eleven: Loch Duich to Loch Ness, South of Loch Mullardoch ==
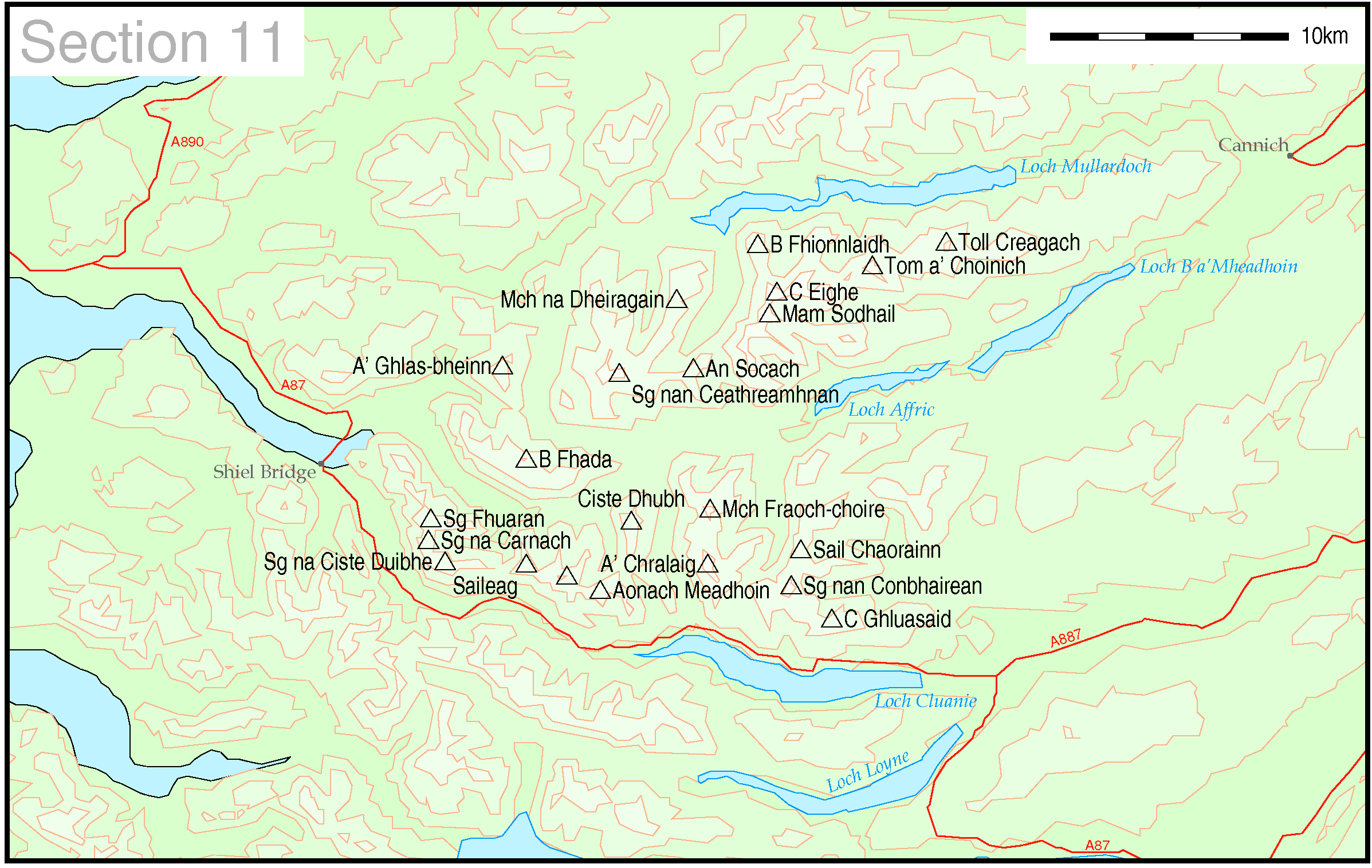

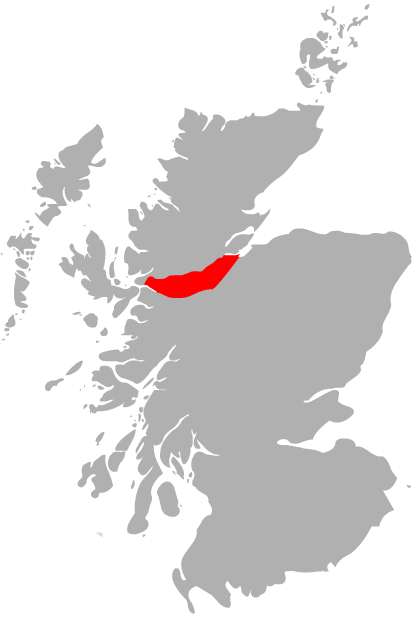

11a. Loch Duich to Cannich

- Càrn Eige (1182.8 m)
  - Mam Sodhail (1179.4 m)
  - Tom a' Choinich (1112 m)
  - Toll Creagach (1054 m)
  - Beinn Fhionnlaidh (1004.7 m)
- Sgùrr nan Ceathreamhnan (1151 m)
  - Mullach na Dheireagain (982 m)
  - An Socach (921 m)
- Sgùrr Fhuaran (1068.7 m)
  - Sgùrr na Ciste Duibhe (1027 m)
  - Sgùrr na Càrnach (1002 m)
- Sgùrr a' Bhealaich Dheirg (1036 m)
  - Aonach Meadhoin (1001 m)
  - Sàileag (956 m)
- Beinn Fhada (1032 m)
- Ciste Dhubh (979 m)
- A' Ghlas-bheinn (918 m)

11b. Glen Affric to Glen Moriston

- A' Chràlaig (1120 m)
  - Mullach Fraoch-choire (1102 m)
- Sgùrr nan Conbhairean (1109 m)
  - Sail Chaorainn (1002 m)
  - Càrn Ghluasaid (957 m)

== Section twelve: Kyle of Lochalsh to Inverness, North of Loch Mullardoch ==
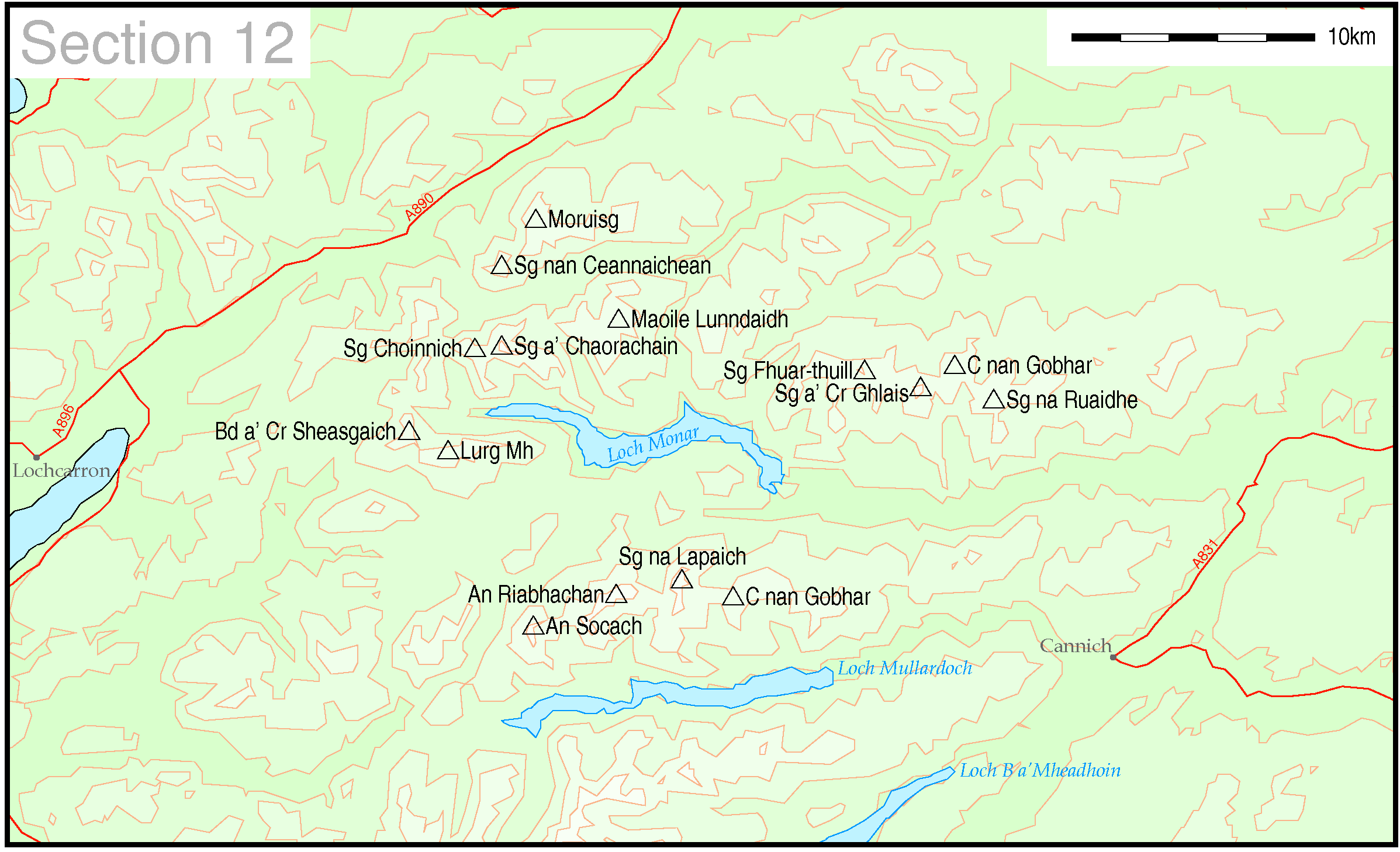

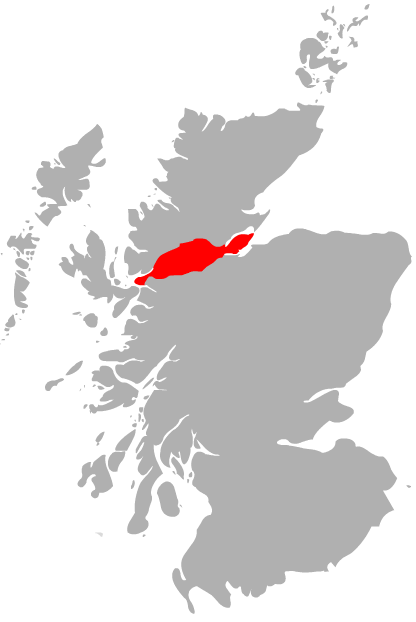

12a. Kyle of Lochalsh to Garve

- Sgùrr a' Choire Ghlais (1083 m)
  - Sgùrr Fhuar-thuill (1049 m)
  - Càrn nan Gobhar (Strathfarrar) (992 m)
- Sgurr a' Chaorachain (1053 m)
  - Sgùrr Choinnich (999.2 m)
- Maoile Lunndaidh (1004.9 m)
- Sgùrr na Ruaidhe (993 m)
- Lurg Mhòr (987 m)
- Bidein a' Choire Sheasgaich (945 m)
- Mòruisg (928 m)

12b. Killilan to Inverness

- Sgùrr na Lapaich (1151 m)
  - Càrn nan Gobhar (Mullardoch)(992 m)
- An Riabhachan (1129 m)
- An Socach (1069 m)

== Section thirteen: Loch Carron to Loch Maree ==
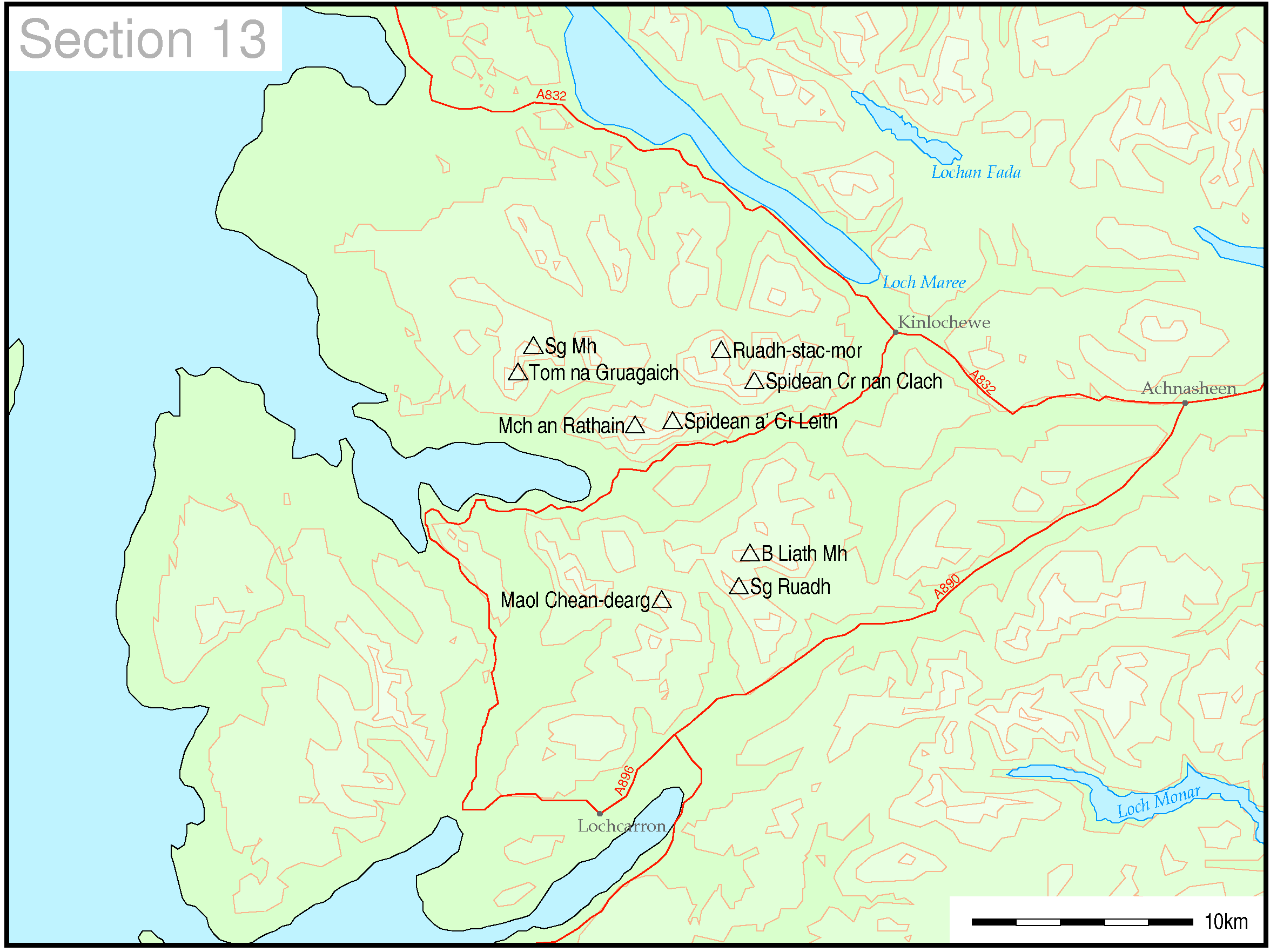

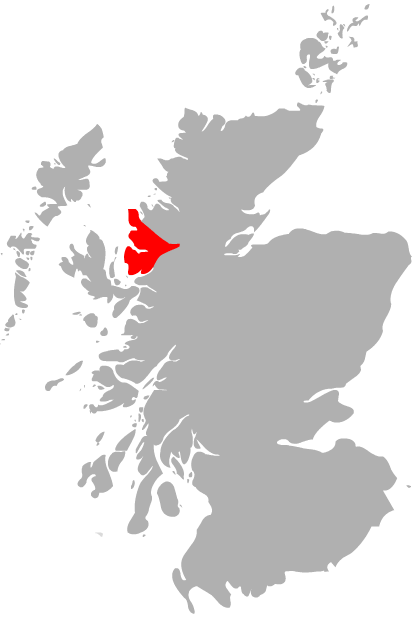

13a. Loch Torridon to Loch Maree

- Liathach - Spidean a' Choire Leith (1055 m)
  - Mullach an Rathain (1023.8 m)
- Beinn Eighe - Ruadh-stac Mòr (1010 m)
  - Spidean Coire nan Clach (993 m)
- Beinn Alligin - Sgùrr Mhòr (986 m)
  - Tom na Gruagaich (922 m)

13b. Applecross to Achnasheen

- Sgorr Ruadh (960.7 m)
- Maol Chean-dearg (933 m)
- Beinn Liath Mhòr (926 m)

== Section fourteen: Loch Maree to Loch Broom and Garve ==
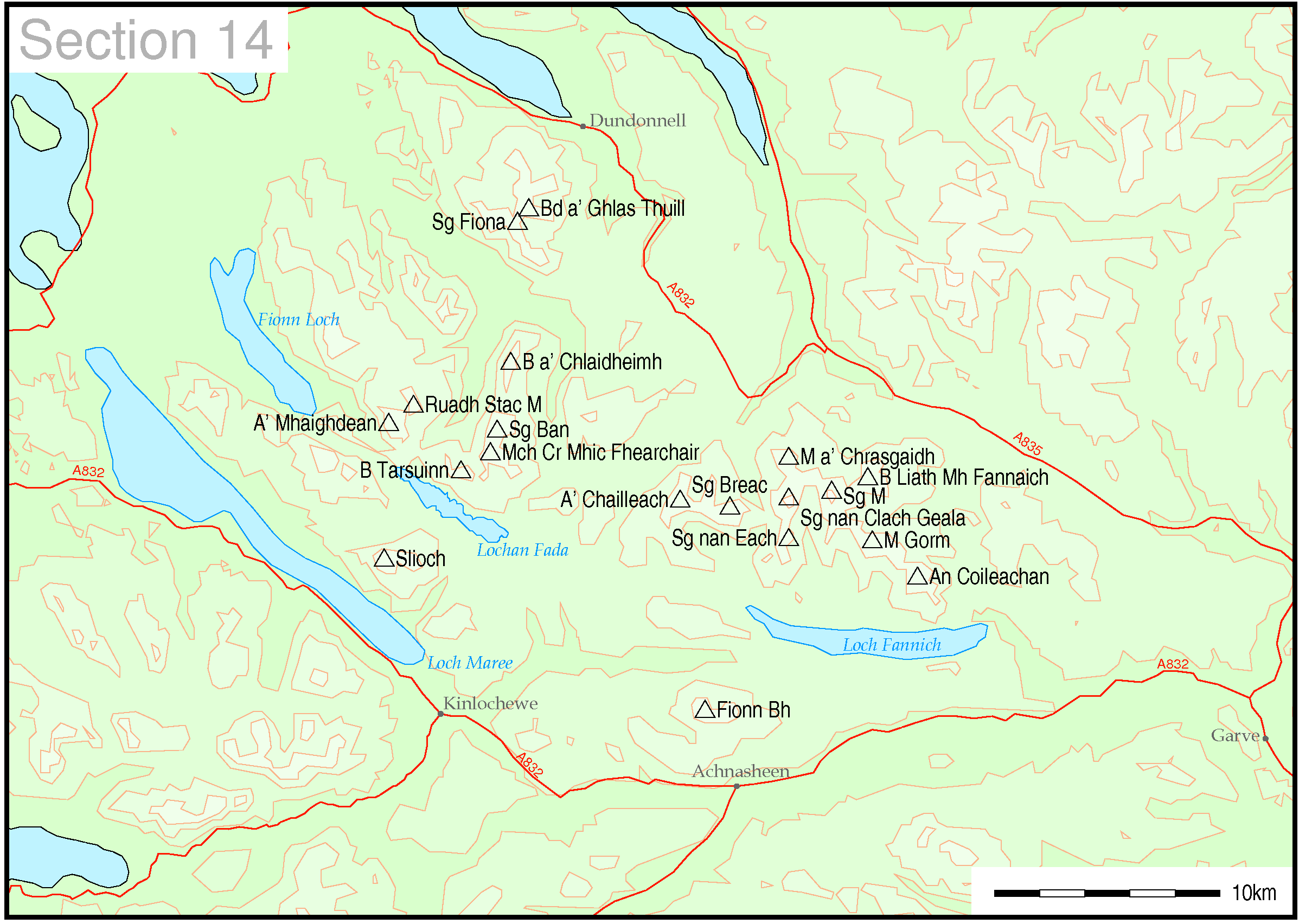

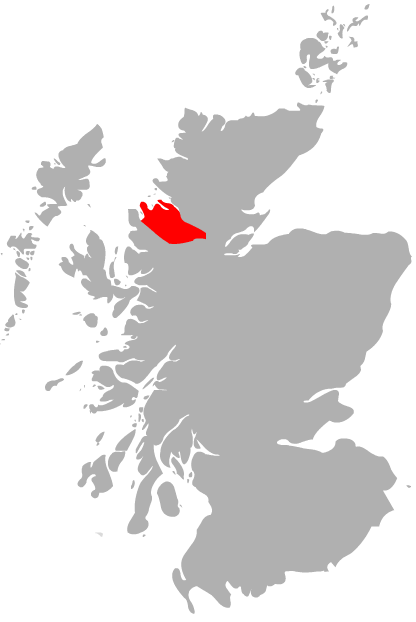

14a. Loch Maree to Loch Broom

- An Teallach - Bidein a' Ghlas Thuill (1062.5 m)
  - Sgùrr Fiona (1058.6 m)
- Mullach Coire Mhic Fhearchair (1015.2 m)
  - Sgùrr Bàn (989 m)
- Slioch (981 m)
- A' Mhaighdean (967 m)
  - Ruadh Stac Mòr (918.7 m)
- Beinn Tarsuinn (933.8 m)

14b. The Fannaichs

- Sgùrr Mòr (1109 m)
  - Beinn Liath Mhòr Fannaich (954 m)
  - Meall Gorm (949 m)
  - Meall a' Chrasgaidh (934 m)
  - An Coileachan (923.9 m)
- Sgùrr nan Clach Geala (1093 m)
  - Sgùrr nan Each (923 m)
- Sgùrr Breac (999 m)
  - A' Chailleach (997 m)
- Fionn Bheinn (933 m)

== Section fifteen: Ullapool to the Moray Firth ==
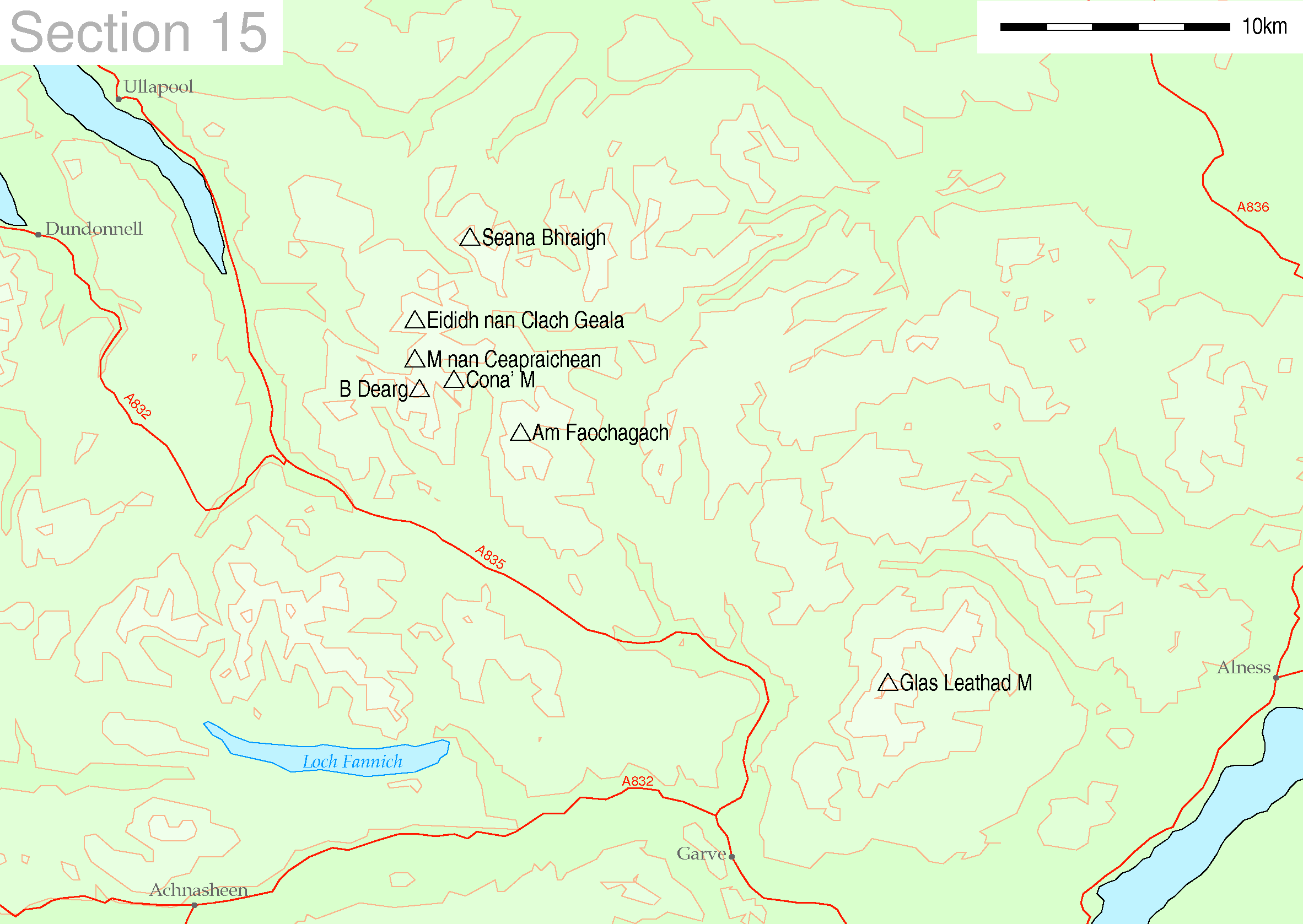

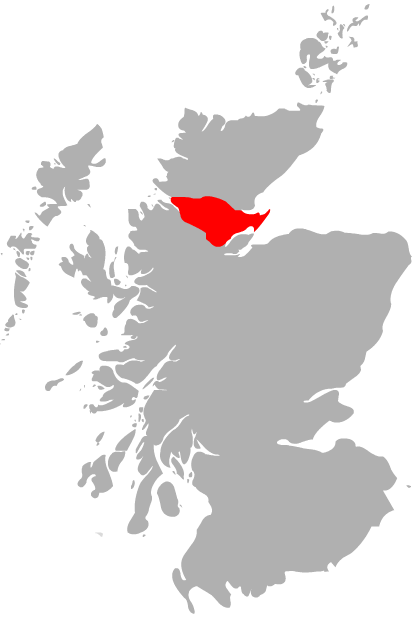

15a. Loch Broom to Strath Oykel

- Beinn Dearg (1084 m)
  - Cona' Mheall (978 m)
  - Meall nan Ceapraichean (977 m)
  - Eididh nan Clach Geala (927 m)
- Am Faochagach (953 m)
- Seana Bhràigh (926 m)

15b. Loch Vaich to the Moray Firth

- Ben Wyvis - Glas Leathad Mòr (1046 m)

== Section sixteen: The Far North ==
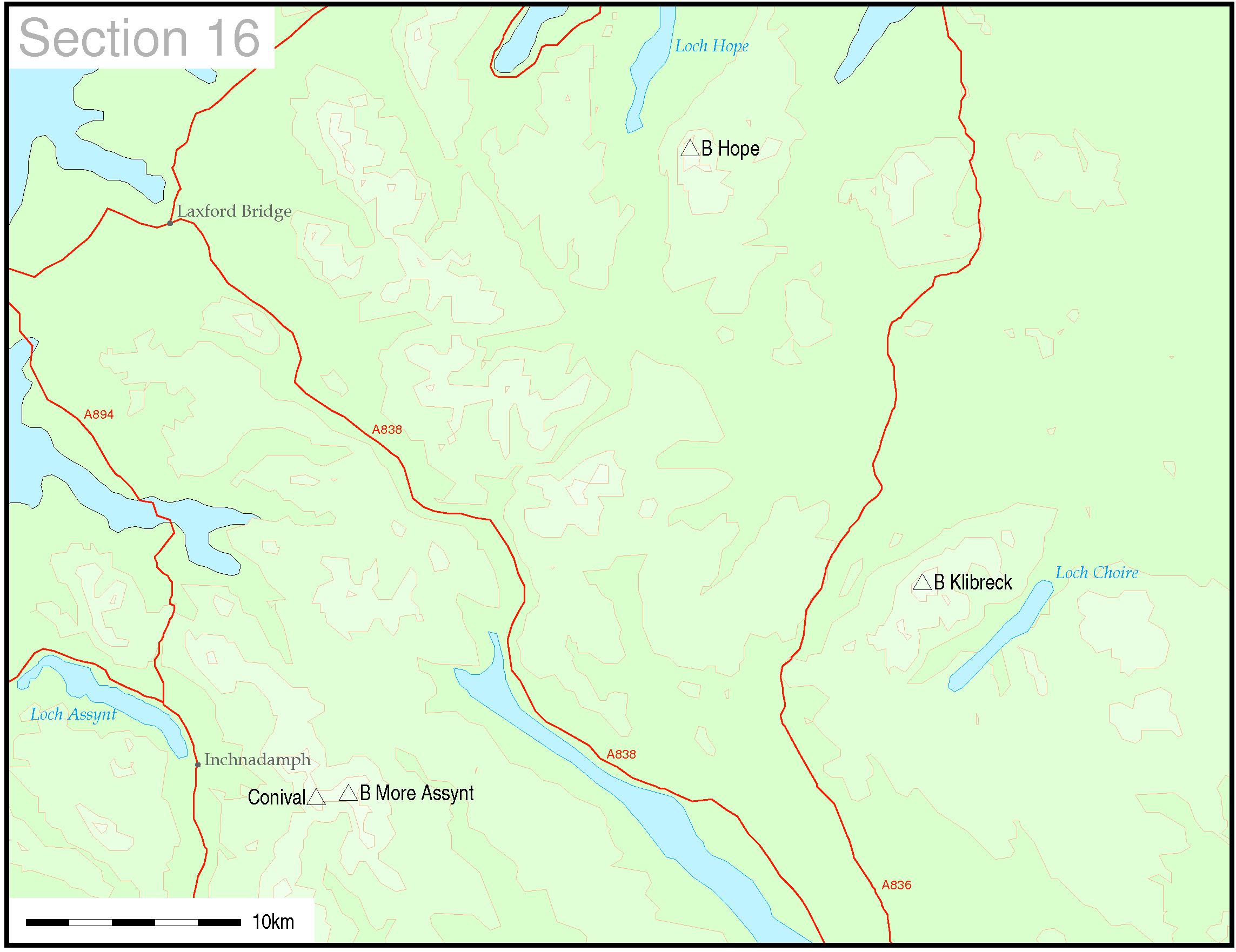

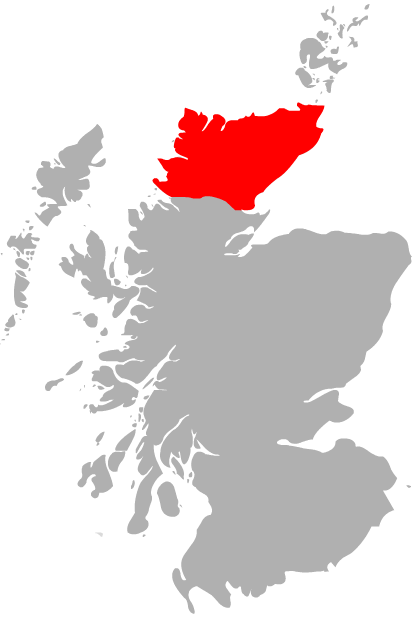

16a. Durness to Loch Shin

- Ben Hope (927 m)

16b. Altnaharra to Dornoch

- Ben Klibreck - Meall nan Con (962.1 m)

16c. Scourie to Lairg

- Ben More Assynt (998 m)
  - Conival (987 m)

== Section seventeen: Skye and Mull ==
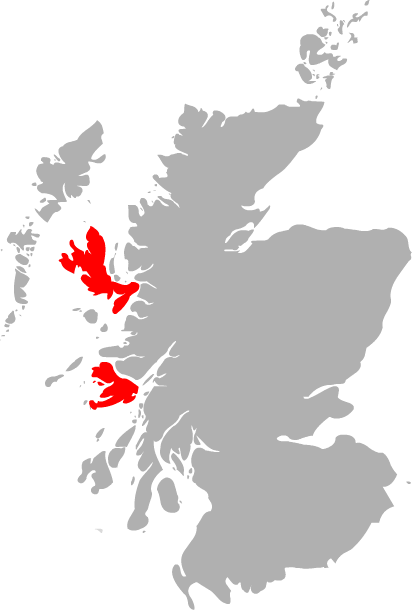

17a. Skye Cuillin

- Sgùrr Alasdair (992 m)
  - Sgùrr Dearg - Inaccessible Pinnacle (985.8 m)
  - Sgùrr a' Ghreadaidh (972.1 m)
  - Sgùrr na Banachdaich (965 m)
  - Sgùrr MhicChoinnich (948.1 m)
  - Sgùrr Dubh Mòr (944 m)
  - Sgùrr nan Eag (926.2 m)
  - Sgùrr a' Mhadaidh (918 m)
- Sgùrr nan Gillean (966.1 m)
  - Bruach na Frìthe (958.8 m)
  - Am Basteir (934 m)
- Blà Bheinn (Blaven) (929 m)

17b. Mull

- Ben More (966 m)

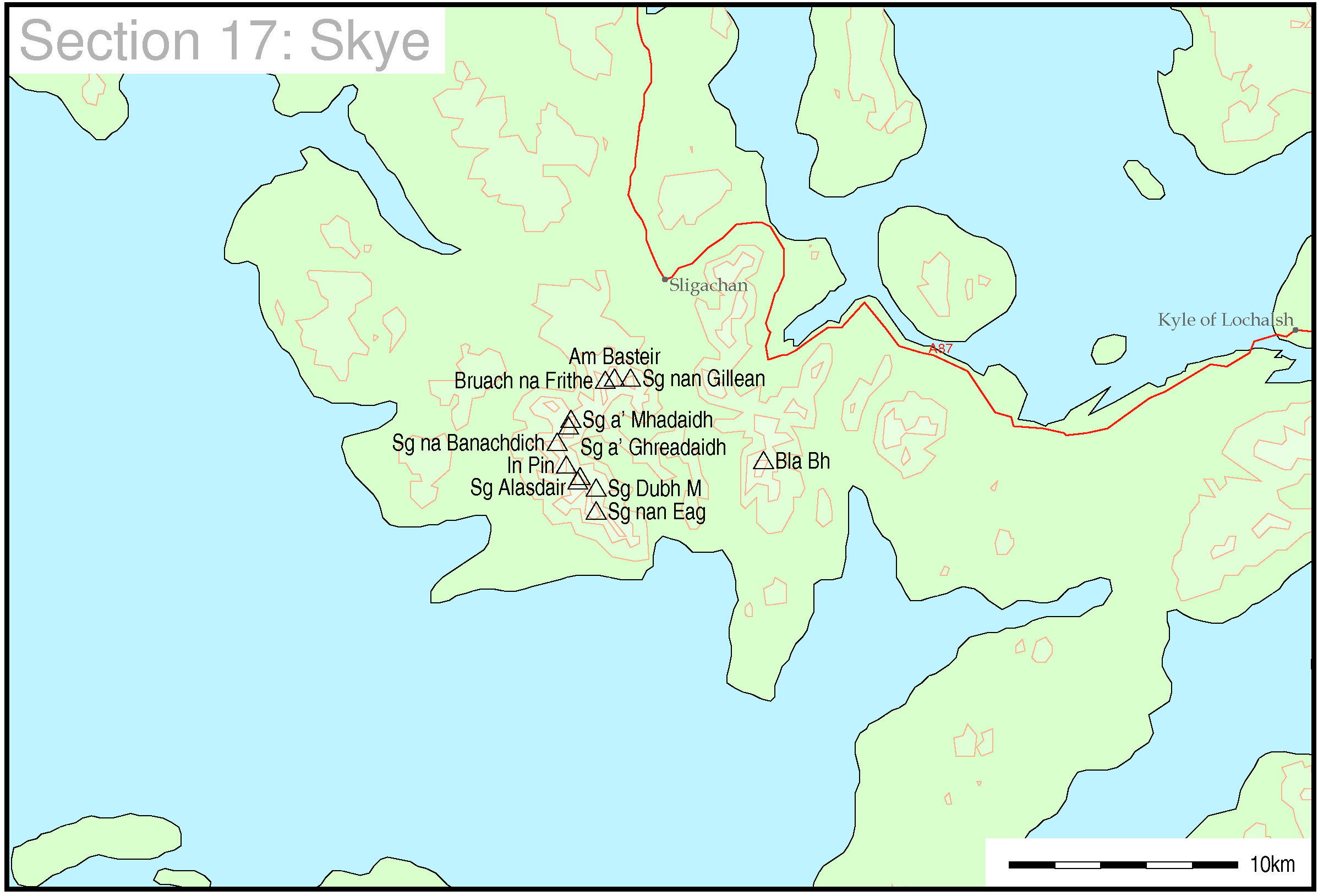

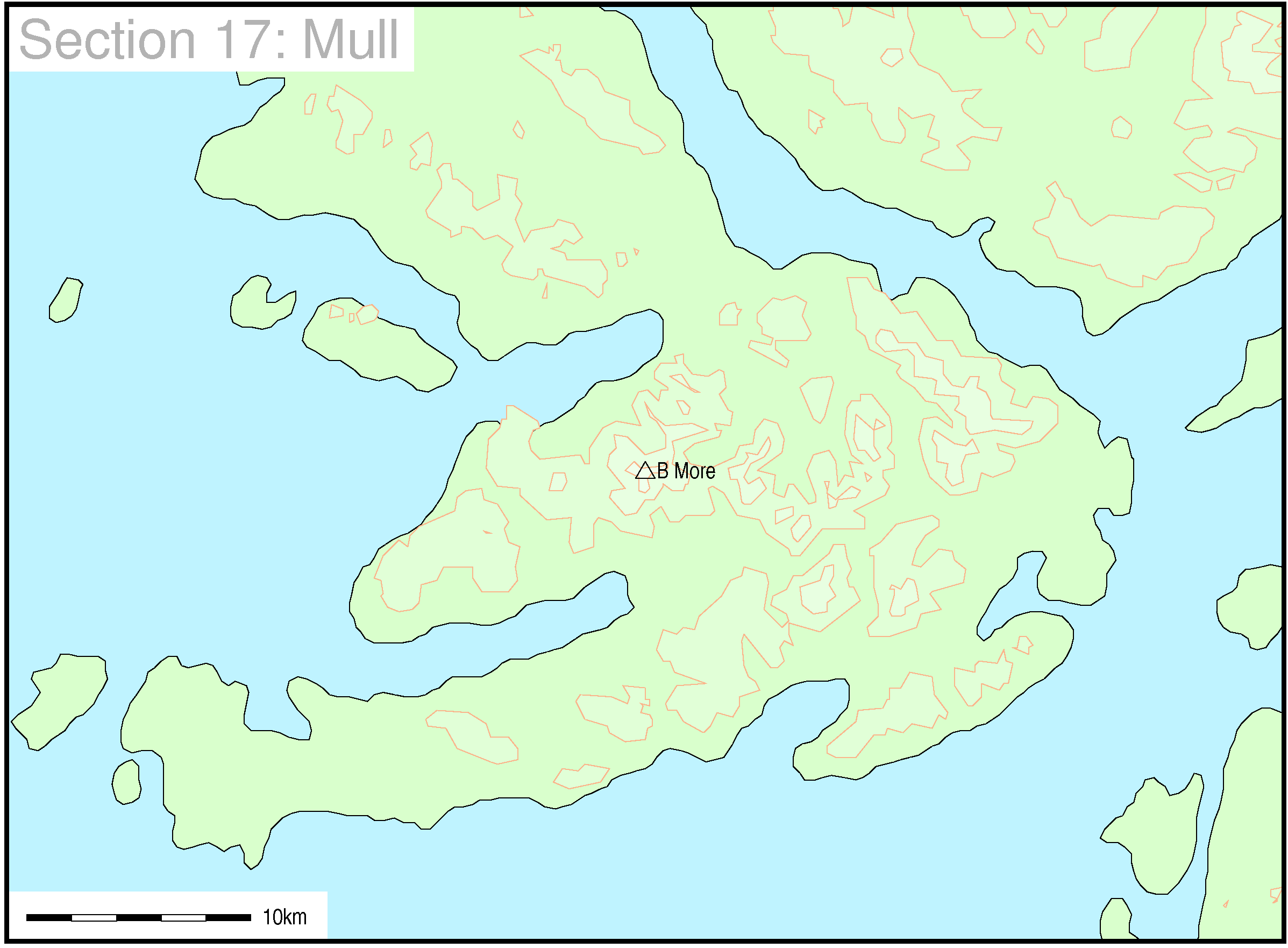

== Bibliography ==
- Donald Bennet; Rab Anderson (2006). The Munros: Scottish Mountaineering Club Hillwalkers' Guide. Scottish Mountaineering Club. ISBN 978-0907521945.
- Sir Hugo T. Munro; Derek A. Bearhop (1997). Munro's Tables (Scottish Mountaineering Club District Guides). Scottish Mountaineering Club. ISBN 978-0907521532.

== See also ==
- Lists of mountains and hills in the British Isles
- List of mountains of the British Isles by height
- List of Munro and Munro Tops in Scotland
- List of Murdos (mountains)
- List of Corbetts (mountains)
- List of Grahams (mountains)
- List of Donald mountains in Scotland
