= Glen Strathfarrar =

Valley in Scotland

Glen Strathfarrar National Scenic Area
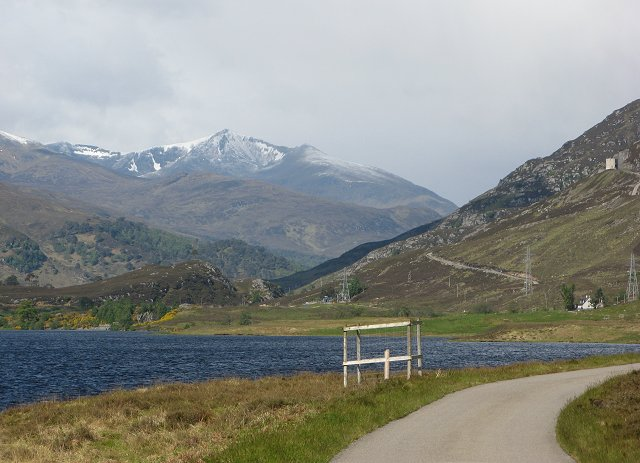
- View along the glen across Loch Beannacharan, with Sgùrr na Lapaich beyond

- Location within Highland
- Location: Highland, Scotland
- Coordinates: 57°24′51″N 4°50′21″W
- Area: 40 km^{2} (15 sq mi)
- Established: 1981
- Governing body: NatureScot

Glen Strathfarrar (Scottish Gaelic: Srath Farair) is a glen in the Highland region of Scotland, near Loch Ness.

The Glen is part of the Affric-Beauly hydro-electric power scheme, with a dam at Loch Monar and a 9 km tunnel carrying water to an underground power station at Deanie; a second dam just below Loch Beannacharan feeds a tunnel carrying water to Culligran power station (also underground). The Monar dam at Loch Monar is the largest arch dam in Britain.

The central section of Glen Strathfarrar (covering 4,027 ha (9,950 acres)) is designated as a national scenic area, one of forty such areas in Scotland, which have been defined so as to identify areas of exceptional scenery and to ensure its protection from inappropriate development. The area covered by the NSA represents the section of the glen least affected by the hydro-electric scheme, and includes the Culligran Falls.

== Etymology ==
Glen Strathfarrar is named for the River Farrar, recorded in Roman times as Varrar. The name is from *h2uer, "flowing water" (cf. the -wery- element in Tryweryn).

Other etymologies have involved an Old Pictish element *var, apparently meaning "to wind", the Latin varius with a connotation of "bending river", and an Old Celtic *vo-arar meaning "gentle river". Other hypothesizes connect Farrar with a river in modern-day France known in Latin as Arar, allegedly connected to Welsh, araf meaning "fast".

The full name is a curious 'Gaelicisation' of the Gaelic: as a strath is an elongated glen, a title of 'Glen Strath' is tautological, and it is therefore likely that an English-only speaker, ignorant of the meaning of 'Strath' when transcribing the map of the location, recorded that this was the 'Glen of Strathfarrar'.

== Geography ==
The River Farrar (Scottish Gaelic: Farar / Uisge Farair) is formed as the waters of the Uisge Misgeach and the Garbh-uisge merge around 2 km after the latter exits Loch Monar. The river then adopts a sinuous course along the flat floor of the glen, running eastwards through two lochs, Loch a' Mhuillidh and Loch Beannacharan, which is dammed as part of the Affric-Beauly hydro-electric power scheme. The river then continues east, passing over Culligran Falls, before merging with the waters of the River Glass to form the River Beauly below Struy Bridge near the village of Struy.

There are a number of mountains on either side of the glen, many of which are popular with walkers. These include the Munros of Sgùrr a' Choire Ghlais, Sgurr Fhuar-thuill, Càrn nan Gobhar and Sgurr na Ruaidhe to the north, as well as Sgùrr na Lapaich, another Càrn nan Gobhar, An Riabhachan and An Socach to the south. There are also two Corbetts - Beinn a' Bha'ach Ard and Sgorr na Dìollaid.

== Natural heritage ==
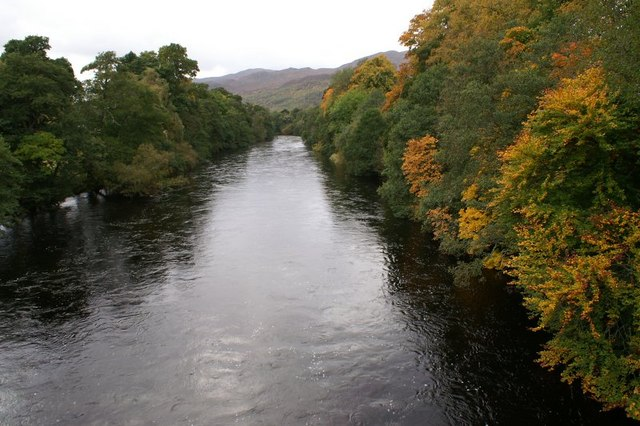
River Farrar at Struy

Glen Strathfarrar contains several areas of Caledonian Forest, the name given to the remnants of the old-growth temperate rainforest of Scotland composed chiefly of Scots pine trees that first colonised the area after the last Ice Age 8–10,000 years ago, and which forms an important habitat for species such as capercaillie, crested tit and the endemic Scottish crossbill. Since the late 18th century commercial timber extraction (especially during the two world wars) and human settlement have contributed to the serious deterioration of the woodland. In addition to the pinewood, there are areas of birch, and more open areas of heather, bracken and grass. Red deer, otters, and golden eagles are all known to inhabit the area, which also hosts several dragonfly species.

Glen Strathfarrar is designated as part of both Special Protection Area and a Special Area of Conservation under the Natura 2000 programme, as well as being designated as a Site of Special Scientific Interest (SSSI). The glen, along with the neighbouring glens of Glen Affric and Glen Cannich, was proposed for inclusion in a national park by the Ramsay Committee in 1945, but this has not been actioned as of 2020.

== History ==
During the Penal laws, the Gaels of Glen Strathfarrar who belonged to the illegal Catholic Church in Scotland attended a covert "Mass house". Between 1735 and 1746, the laity were served from a mountain cave dwelling in Glen Cannich by three outlawed Roman Catholic priests of the Society of Jesus; Frs. Charles (Scottish Gaelic: Maighstir Teàrlach, an t-Athair Teàrlach Mac Fhearchair) and John Farquharson (Scottish Gaelic: Maighstir Iain, an-tAthair Iain Mac Fhearchair) and future Catholic martyr Fr. Alexander Cameron (Scottish Gaelic: Maighstir Sandaidh, an t-Athair Alasdair Camshròn).

A small island in Loch a' Mhuillidh holds the remains of a building used by Simon Fraser, 11th Lord Lovat on his flight from Culloden after the unsuccessful Jacobite rising of 1745. Following this rebellion the Highlands underwent massive social changes. Rising rents, religious persecution, and the introduction of both sheep farming and deer forests led to both large scale voluntary emigration and the evictions known as the Highland clearances. This is not to say that every Highland landlord was guilty of unnecessary cruelty.

For example, upon hearing news of the 1830 Glen Cannich clearances ordered by Mrs William Chisholm of Chisholm to make way for Lowland shepherds, Thomas Fraser, 12th Lord Lovat offered all of her former tenants highly favourable terms to resettle on his own estate at Strathfarrar. Even though it meant relocating his existing tenants from the Glen, Lord Lovat's offer was accepted and the former Glen Cannich tenants' new leases began on Whitsunday, 1831.

The Affric-Beauly hydro-electric power scheme following the Second World War led to yet further depopulation in Strathfarrar, with only two buildings (the keeper's house at Monar and Pait Lodge) surviving the rising waters of Loch Monar.

== Access ==
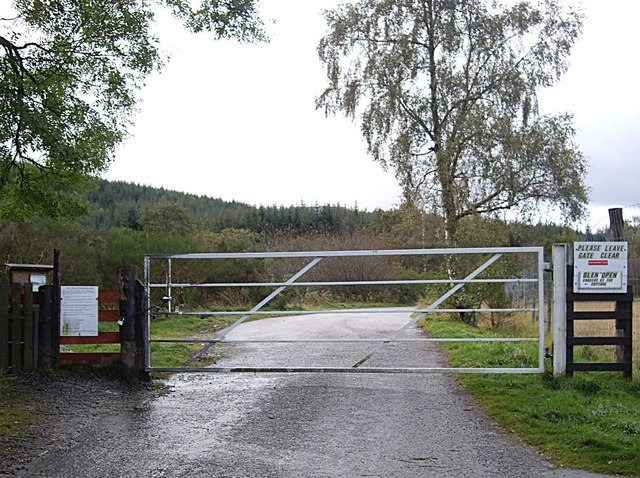
Locked gate

The road along the glen is private, and a locked gate system operates whereby permission for motor vehicle access must be requested at the gatehouse. A quota of cars are allowed in the glen each day. Access times vary, according to the month, between 9am and 8pm. In the winter the only means of access is to contact Mountaineering Scotland who will give a security code for the gate. The resulting relative lack of cars through the glen contributes to the remote and utter peace and calm, especially of the upper reaches of the glen toward Loch Monar.

As with all land in Scotland, there is a right of responsible access to most of the land in the glen, and there is thus no restriction on access along the glen by foot, bicycle or other non-motorised transport.
