= Càrn nan Gobhar =

Carn nan Gobhar may refer to:

- Càrn nan Gobhar (Mullardoch), a mountain on the northern side of Loch Mullardoch in the upper part of Glen Cannich
- Càrn nan Gobhar (Strathfarrar), a mountain on the northern side of Glen Strathfarrar
