= Sgùrr a' Choire Ghlais =

Mountain in Scotland

Coordinates: 57.44383°N 4.90265°W

Sgurr a' Choire Ghlais
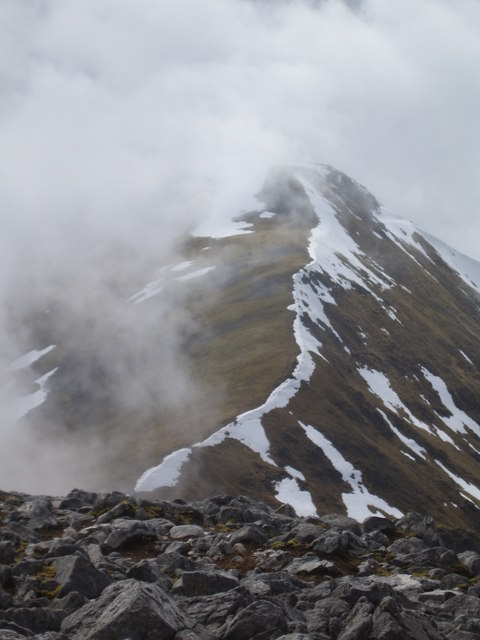
- The north-east ridge

Highest point
- Elevation: 1,083 m (3,553 ft)
- Prominence: 818 m (2,684 ft)Ranked 31st in British Isles
- Parent peak: Sgurr na Lapaich
- Listing: Munro, Marilyn

Naming
- English translation: Rocky Peak of the Grey Corrie
- Language of name: Gaelic
- Pronunciation: Scottish Gaelic: [ˈs̪kuːrˠ ə ˈxɔɾʲə ˈɣl̪ˠaʃ] English approximation: SKOOR-ə-COR-yə-GLASH

Geography
- Location: Glen Strathfarrar, Scotland
- OS grid: NH259430
- Topo map: OS Landranger 25

Sgurr a' Choire Ghlais is a mountain in the North-west Highlands of Scotland. It lies between Glen Strathfarrar and Glen Orrin and it is an excellent viewpoint, being the highest mountain in its group - a group which includes the Munros of Sgurr na Ruaidhe, Sgurr Fhuar-thuill and Carn nan Gobhar. Northwards there is no higher ground apart from the Fannichs.

It is one of the most difficult hills to reach in Scotland, the shortest route involving a 10-mile approach up Glen Strathfarrar. A bicycle, or permission to drive along the private road up Strathfarrar, may shorten the approach.

== See also ==
- List of mountains of the British Isles by relative height
- List of Munros
- List of Marilyns in the Northern Highlands
