= Sgorr na Dìollaid =

Mountain in Scotland

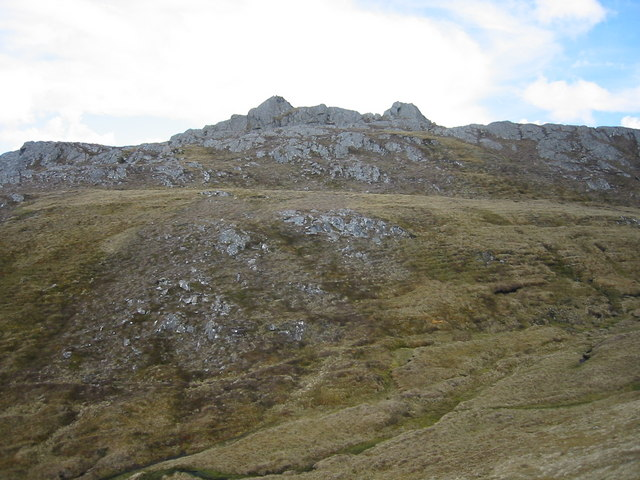

Highest point
- Elevation: 818 m (2,684 ft)
- Prominence: 309 m (1,014 ft)
- Listing: Marilyn, Corbett
- Coordinates: 57°23′02″N 4°51′36″W

Naming
- English translation: peak of the saddle
- Language of name: Gaelic

Geography
- Location within Highland
- Location: Highland, Scotland
- OS grid: NH281362
- Topo map: OS Landranger 25, Explorer 430

Sgorr na Dìollaid is a mountain in the Northwest Highlands of Scotland. It is situated between Glen Strathfarrar and Glen Cannich, 7 km north-west of the village of Cannich.
