= An Riabhachan =

Mountain in Scotland

Coordinates: 57.362438°N 5.104728°W

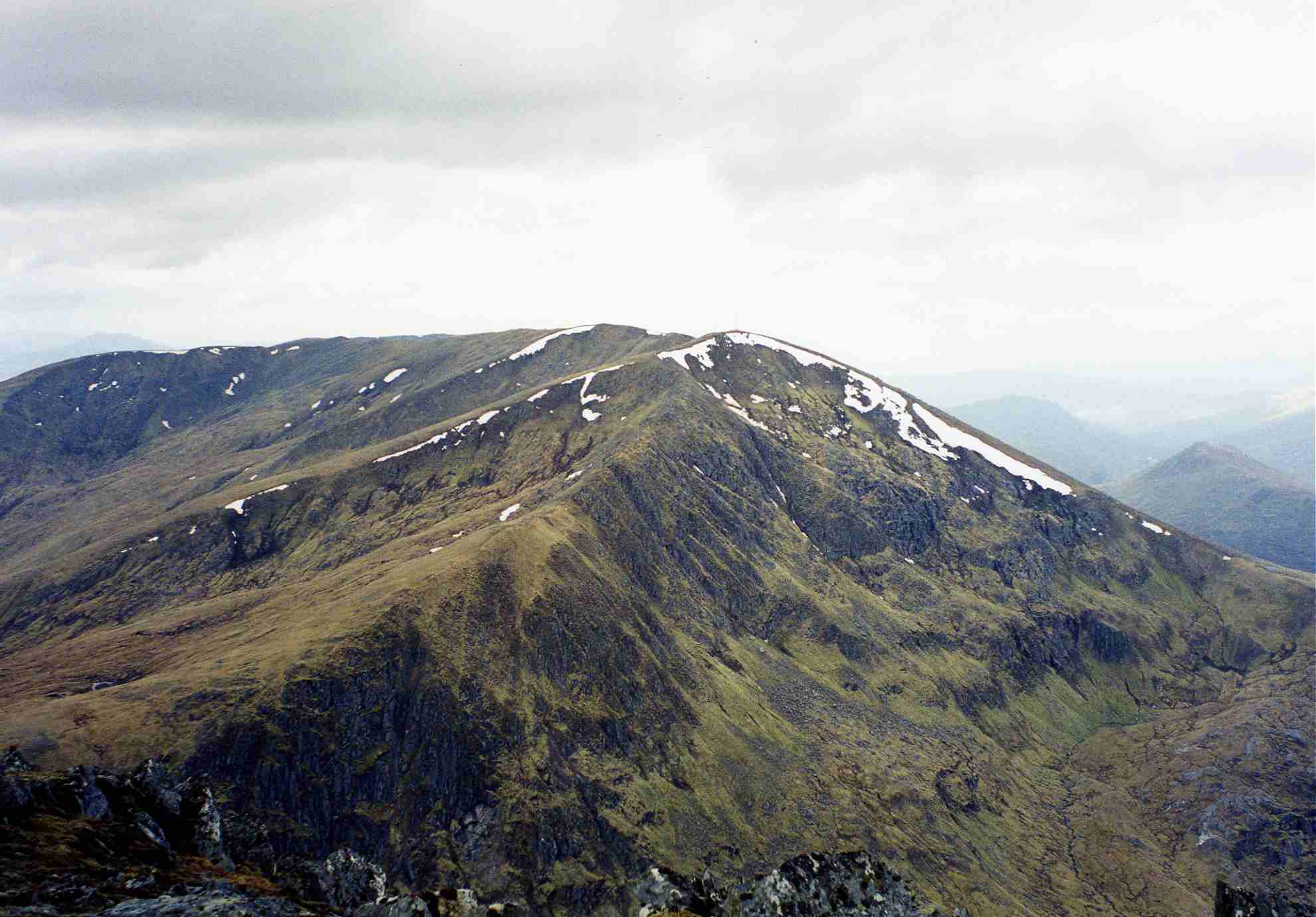
- An Riabhachan seen from Sgurr na Lapaich, three kilometres to the east.

Highest point
- Elevation: 1,129 m (3,704 ft)
- Prominence: 302 m (991 ft)
- Listing: Munro, Marilyn

Naming
- English translation: The Brindled One
- Language of name: Gaelic
- Pronunciation: Scottish Gaelic: [əˈrˠiəvəxan] English approximation: ən-REER-və-khan

Geography
- Location within Scotland
- Location: Highland, Scotland
- Parent range: Northwest Highlands
- OS grid: NH133344
- Topo map: OS Landranger 25, OS Explorer 414

Listed summits of An Riabhachan
Name	Grid ref	Height	Status
South West Top	NH122336	1,086 m (3,563 ft)	Munro Top
West Top	NH117337	1,040 m (3,410 ft)	Munro Top

An Riabhachan is a Scottish mountain in the Skye and Lochalsh district of the Highland council area. It is situated 35 kilometres east of Kyle of Lochalsh standing in an isolated position at the western end of Loch Mullardoch, ten kilometres from any public road.

== Overview ==
An Riabhachan reaches a height of 1129 metres (3704 feet) and is one of the highest Munros north of the Great Glen. The mountain's name originates from the Gaelic language and translates as “The Brindled One” which is believed to refer to the flecked effect given by the stone studded turf on the hill.

== Geography ==
An Riabhachan is a mainly grassy mountain. The only rocky area is at the north-east end of the summit ridge, above the fine craggy coire of Coire Gnada containing the lochans of Loch Mòr and Loch Beag. The east ridge links to the adjacent Munro of Sgurr na Lapaich and follows the steep edge above Coire Gnada. The mountain has a 2.5 km long summit ridge which does not drop below 1000 metres throughout its length and contains three other high points. At the north east end of the summit ridge is the NE Top with a height of 1125 metres. In the 1921 revision of Munro's Tables it was named as the principal summit of the mountain, but reverted to the current summit in the 1933 and subsequent editions. It was deleted from the list of Munro Tops in 1997.

With the demise of the NE Top, An Riabhachan has been left with just two subsidiary Tops. The West Top with a height of 1040 metres stands at the western end of the summit ridge, before descending to the Bealach Bholla and reascending to the adjoining Munro of An Socach. The South West Top lies 700m SE of the West Top and has a height of 1086 metres. The summit ridge falls away on both sides over grassy slopes to Loch Mullardoch to the south and to the upper part of Glen Strathfarrar to the north.

== Ascents ==
The mountain is usually climbed together with two or three of the other Munros on the north side of Loch Mullardoch. The most convenient ascent of all four Munros starts at the Mullardoch dam in Glen Cannich (grid reference NH219316) and proceeds 9 km along the loch's northern shore before climbing An Socach, continuing to An Riabhachan and returning via Sgurr na Lapaich and Càrn nan Gobhar. The long walk along the shore can be bypassed by hiring a boat, currently available between 1 April and 1 August. The walk can be shortened by omitting An Socach, but it is better to include it if you can as there is no easier access to this remote Munro.

The alternative route starts in Glen Strathfarrar to the north at the hydroelectric power station in Gleann Innis (grid reference NH182381), reached by a 17-mile drive from Struy along a private road; the locked gate at the entrance to this road is opened at specified times to give access to vehicles. From the power station a stalkers' path leads to the Bealach Toll an Lochain between An Riabhachan and Sgurr na Lapaich, from where there is a further climb west of over 300 metres to reach the summit. A return to the power station can be made over Sgurr na Lapaich and Càrn nan Gobhar.

== See also ==
- Ben Nevis
- List of Munro mountains
- Mountains and hills of Scotland
