= Càrn nan Gobhar (Strathfarrar) =

Mountain in Scotland

Coordinates: 57.4515°N 4.8799°W

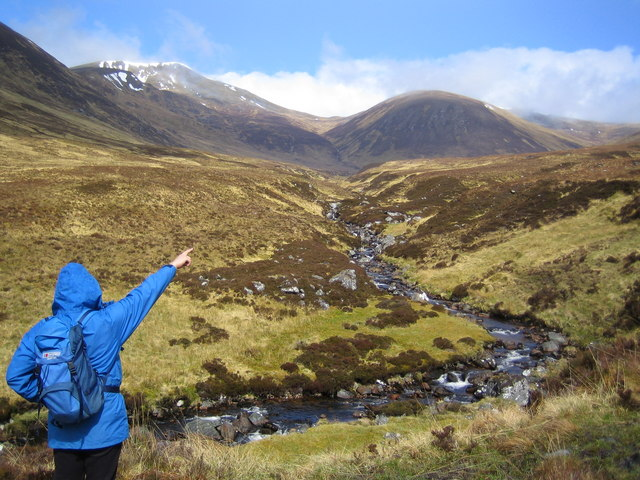
- Càrn nan Gobhar is the round hill to the right, May 2006

Highest point
- Elevation: 992 m (3,255 ft)
- Prominence: 137 m (449 ft)
- Parent peak: Sgurr a' Choire Ghlais
- Listing: Munro

Naming
- English translation: hill of the goats
- Language of name: Gaelic
- Pronunciation: Scottish Gaelic: [ˈkʰaːrˠn nəŋ ˈko.əɾ] English approximation: KARN-nən-KOH-ər

Geography
- Location within Scotland
- Location: Highland, Scotland
- Parent range: Northwest Highlands
- OS grid: NH273438
- Topo map: OS Landranger 25, OS Explorer 430

Càrn nan Gobhar is a mountain rising to 992 metres (3,255 ft) in the Northwest Highlands of Scotland. It lies north of Glen Strathfarrar and south of Glen Orrin, some 40 kilometres west of the city of Inverness. It is usually climbed along with the neighbouring Munros of Sgurr a' Choire Ghlais and Sgurr na Ruaidhe.

Somewhat confusingly there is another Càrn nan Gobhar, also a Munro with almost the same height, standing 14 kilometres to the south west, on the opposite side of Glen Strathfarrar.

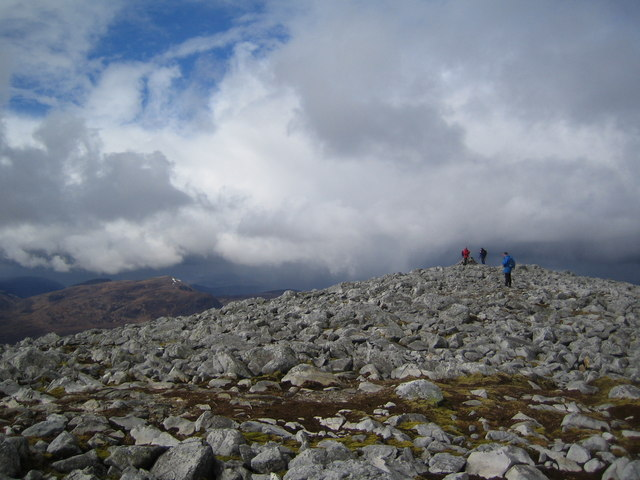
Stony summit of Càrn nan Gobhar
