= Càrn nan Gobhar (Mullardoch) =

Mountain in Highland, Scotland

Coordinates: 57°21′48″N 5°1′31″W

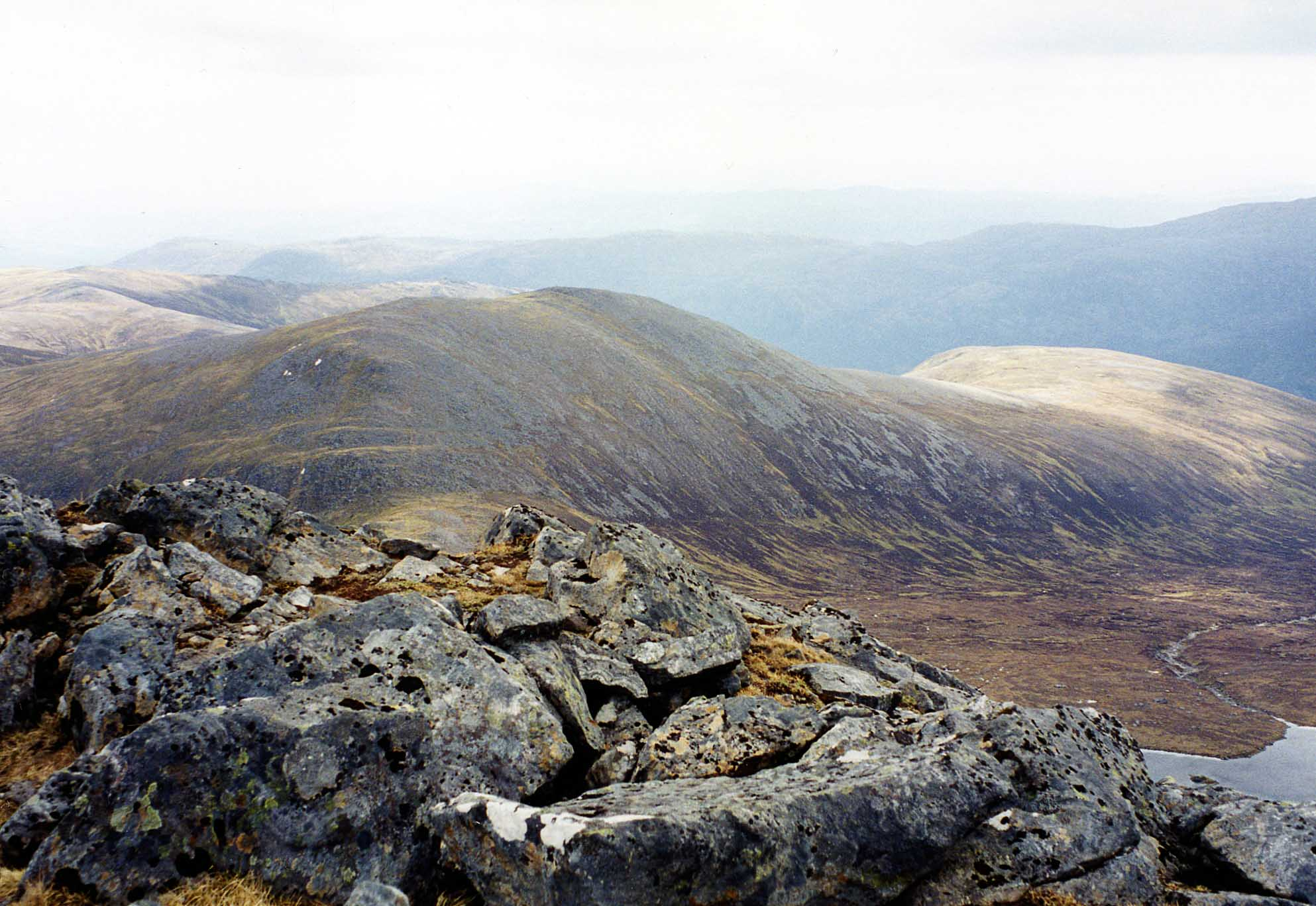
- Càrn nan Gobhar seen from Sgùrr na Lapaich, 2.5 km to the NW.

Highest point
- Elevation: 993 m (3,258 ft)
- Prominence: 198 m (650 ft)
- Listing: Munro, Marilyn

Naming
- English translation: cairn of the goats
- Language of name: Gaelic
- Pronunciation: Scottish Gaelic: [ˈkʰaːrˠn nəŋ ˈko.əɾ] English approximation: KARN-nən-KOH-ər

Geography
- Location: Highland, Scotland
- Parent range: Northwest Highlands
- OS grid: NH181343
- Topo map: OS Landranger 25, OS Explorer 430

Listed summits of Càrn nan Gobhar (Mullardoch)
Name	Grid ref	Height	Status
Creag Dubh	NH199350	947 m (3107 ft)	Munro Top

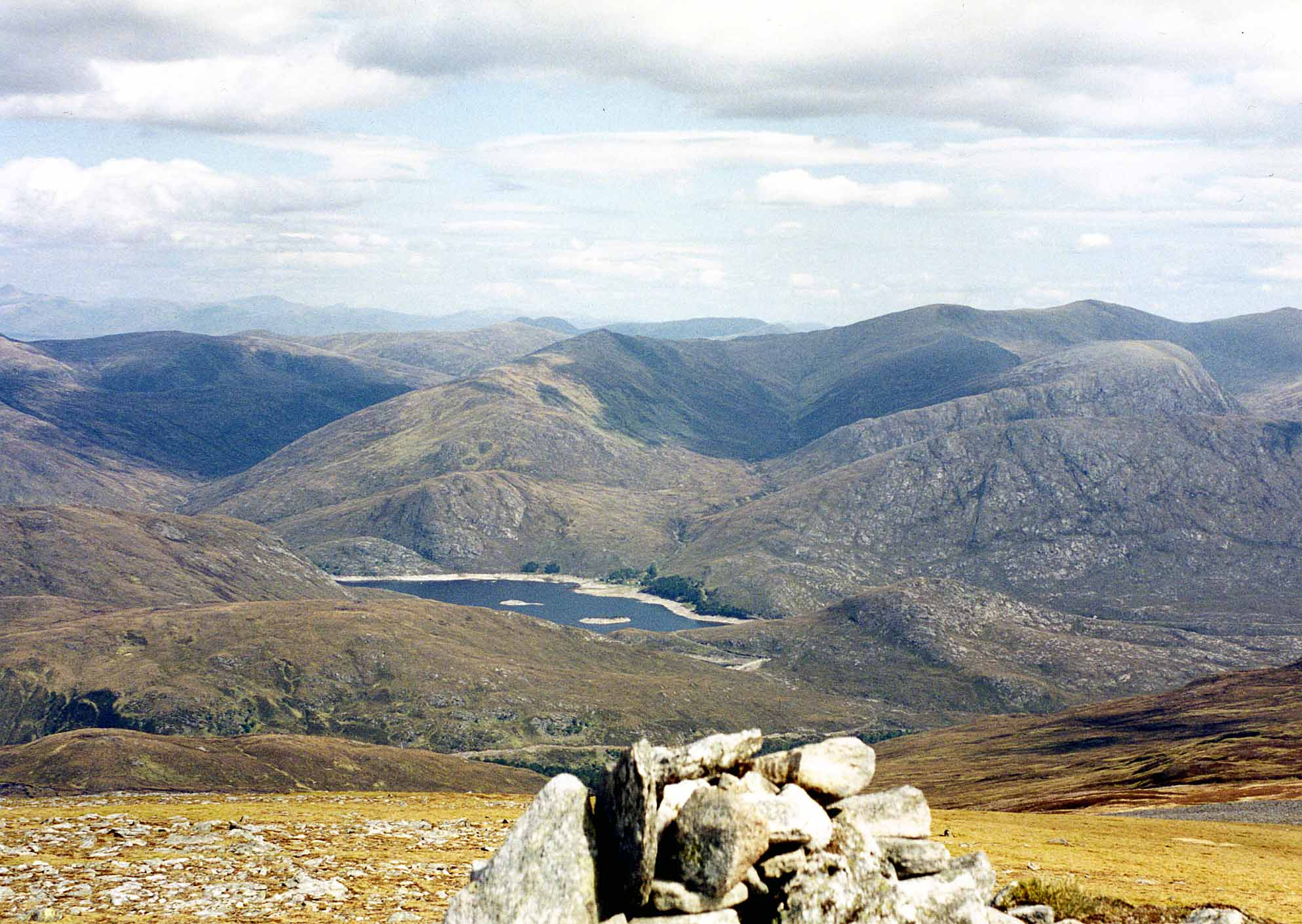
The view north from the summit to Loch Monar and Glen Strathfarrar.

Càrn nan Gobhar is a mountain rising to 993 metres (3,258 ft) in the Northwest Highlands of Scotland. It stands on the northern side of Loch Mullardoch in the upper part of Glen Cannich, in a remote group of four Munros informally known as "The Mullardochs" which form the high ground between Loch Mullardoch and Loch Monar.

== Overview ==
Càrn nan Gobhar reaches a height of 993 metres (3258 feet) and qualifies as a Munro and a Marilyn. Somewhat confusingly there is another Càrn nan Gobhar, also a Munro with exactly the same height situated 14 kilometres to the north east on the northern side of Glen Strathfarrar. Càrn nan Gobhar is the lowest of the four Munros on the north shore of Loch Mullardoch and is rather overshadowed by them. Topographically it is quite featureless, being mainly composed of rolling grassy slopes interspersed with patches of rock and scree, though with steeper slopes on the west and east flanks. The hill's name translates from the Gaelic as “Cairn (i.e. hill) of the Goats”

== Geography ==
Càrn nan Gobhar has three main ridges, giving the mountain a roughly triangular shape. The 3.5 km long SSE ridge passes over the subsidiary top of Mullach na Moille (761 metres) before swinging more easterly and dropping down to the eastern end of Loch Mullardoch. The north western ridge links to the adjoining Munro of Sgurr na Lapaich via the Bealach na Cloiche Duibhe. The north eastern ridge leads to the Munro “Top” of Creag Dubh (947 metres). Creag Dubh has a prominence of 93 metres and was designated as a mountain in Sir Hugh Munro’s original list of 1891, but was downgraded to a top in 1921. Its north eastern slopes are initially rocky as they drop down to the Glen Strathfarrar Forest.

Càrn nan Gobhar’s best feature is its south facing corrie of Coire an t-Sith (Corrie of the Fairies). It is drained by the Allt Mullardoch which descends to Loch Mullardoch in a series of small waterfalls. The corrie's well-constructed stalker's path can be utilised to make a high level circuit of the corrie which takes in the Munro summit and the “Top”. All drainage from the mountain is east to the Beauly Firth via the glens of Strathfarrar or Cannich.

== Ascent and summit ==
The most convenient starting point for the ascent of Càrn nan Gobhar is the parking place at the end of the public road in Glen Cannich by the Loch Mullardoch dam at grid reference NH219315. The route follows the northern shore of the loch for 1.5 km before ascending steeply up the SSE ridge passing over Mullach na Moille on the way to the summit. The mountain is often climbed in conjunction with Sgurr na Lapaich and strong walkers will also take in the other two Mullardoch Munros of An Riabhachan and An Socach.

The summit of the mountain is a broad, flat north-south ridge with two cairned points 200 metres apart. The smaller northern cairn marks the summit and gives good views north to the Monar Forest Munros of Maoile Lunndaidh and Lurg Mhòr. It is also a good viewpoint for the corries and cliffs of nearby Sgurr na Lapaich.
