= List of highest mountains in Scotland =

View southwest from Ben Lawers, Scottish Highlands

This is a list of the 100 highest mountains in Scotland by elevation.

== List of 100 highest mountains in Scotland ==
Mountains are ranked by height and by prominence via Simms classification (DoBIH, October 2018).

Height	Prominence	Name	Image	Height (m)	Prom. (m)	Height (ft)	Prom. (ft)
1	1	Ben Nevis		1,345	1,345	4,411	4,411
2	7	Ben Macdui		1,309	950	4,295	3,117
3	162	Braeriach		1,296	461	4,252	1,512
4	602	Cairn Toul		1,291	166	4,236	545
5	1578	Carn na Criche		1,265	50	4,150	164
6	830	Sgor an Lochain Uaine		1,258	118	4,127	387
7	677	Cairn Gorm		1,245	146	4,084	478
8	209	Aonach Beag		1,234	404	4,049	1,325
9	738	Aonach Mor		1,221	134	4,006	440
10	1918	Carn Dearg (NW)		1,221	36	4,006	118
11	612	Carn Mor Dearg		1,220	162	4,003	531
12	1027	Cairn Lochan		1,216	91	3,990	299
13	8	Ben Lawers		1,214	915	3,983	3,002
14	1664	Stob Coire an t-Saighdeir		1,213	46	3,980	151
15	167	Beinn a' Bhuird		1,197	456	3,927	1,496
16	1579	Sron na Lairige		1,184	50	3,885	164
17	386	Beinn Mheadhoin		1,183	254	3,881	833
18	2	Carn Eige		1,183	1,147	3,881	3,763
19	749	Mam Sodhail		1,179	132	3,869	434
20	1580	Beinn a' Bhuird South Top		1,179	50	3,868	164
21	176	Stob Choire Claurigh		1,177	446	3,862	1,463
22	1341	Stob Coire an t-Sneachda		1,176	65	3,858	213
23	4	Ben More		1,174	986	3,852	3,235
24	2031	Cnap a' Chleirich		1,174	33	3,852	108
25	512	Ben Avon		1,171	197	3,842	646
26	317	Stob Binnein		1,165	303	3,822	994
27	373	Beinn Bhrotain		1,157	258	3,796	846
28	54	Lochnagar		1,156	671	3,793	2,201
29	703	Derry Cairngorm		1,155	141	3,789	463
30	19	Sgurr na Lapaich		1,151	840	3,776	2,756
31	187	Sgurr nan Ceathreamhnan		1,151	434	3,776	1,424
32	17	Bidean nam Bian		1,149	844	3,771	2,769
33	33	Ben Alder		1,148	783	3,766	2,569
34	1581	Stob a' Choire Dhomhain		1,147	50	3,761	164
35	1842	Sgurr nan Ceathreamhnan West Top		1,143	38	3,750	125
36	2026	Stob Coire Dhomhnuill		1,139	33	3,737	109
37	206	Geal-Chàrn		1,132	410	3,714	1,345
38	11	Ben Lui		1,130	875	3,707	2,871
39	37	Binnein Mor		1,130	759	3,707	2,490
40	320	An Riabhachan		1,129	302	3,704	991
41	14	Creag Meagaidh		1,128	867	3,701	2,844
42	10	Ben Cruachan		1,127	880	3,698	2,887
43	510	Meall Garbh		1,123	198	3,685	650
44	1422	Stob Coire na Ceannain		1,123	59	3,684	194
45	59	Beinn a' Ghlo		1,122	658	3,681	2,159
46	31	A' Chràlaig		1,120	786	3,675	2,579
47	413	Sgor Gaoith		1,118	242	3,668	794
48	785	An Stuc		1,117	126	3,665	413
49	1218	Stob Coire an Laoigh		1,116	74	3,661	243
50	963	Aonach Beag (Ben Alder)		1,116	99	3,661	325
51	840	Stob Coire nan Lochan		1,116	117	3,660	382
52	79	Stob Coire Easain		1,115	611	3,658	2,005
53	714	Monadh Mor		1,113	138	3,652	453
54	661	Tom a' Choinich		1,112	149	3,648	489
55	1439	Sgoran Dubh Mor		1,111	58	3,645	190
56	1207	Carn a' Choire Bhoidheach		1,110	75	3,641	246
57	232	Sgurr nan Conbhairean		1,109	382	3,638	1,253
58	9	Sgurr Mor		1,108	913	3,635	2,995
59	1485	Creagan a' Choire Etchachan		1,108	55	3,635	180
60	29	Meall a' Bhuiridh		1,108	795	3,635	2,608
61	1560	Caisteal		1,106	51	3,629	167
62	708	Stob a' Choire Mheadhoin		1,105	140	3,625	459
63	780	Beinn Eibhinn		1,103	127	3,619	417
64	972	Stob Dearg		1,103	98	3,619	321
65	902	Beinn Ghlas		1,103	107	3,619	351
66	646	Mullach Fraoch-choire		1,102	153	3,615	502
67	591	Creise		1,100	169	3,608	556
68	292	Sgurr a' Mhaim		1,099	316	3,606	1,037
69	1308	Clach Leathad		1,099	68	3,605	222
70	616	Sgurr Choinnich Mor		1,094	159	3,589	522
71	439	Sgurr nan Clach Geala		1,093	229	3,586	751
72	1384	Sgurr nan Clachan Geala		1,093	62	3,586	203
73	338	Bynack More		1,090	283	3,576	928
74	218	Stob Ghabhar		1,090	393	3,576	1,289
75	111	Beinn a' Chlachair		1,087	539	3,566	1,768
76	27	Beinn Dearg		1,084	805	3,556	2,641
77	42	Schiehallion		1,083	716	3,553	2,349
78	25	Sgurr a' Choire Ghlais		1,083	818	3,553	2,684
79	402	Beinn a' Chaorainn		1,083	246	3,553	807
80	1843	Cuidhe Crom		1,083	38	3,553	125
81	64	Beinn a' Chreachain		1,081	650	3,545	2,133
82	1681	Stob Coire Easain		1,080	45	3,543	148
83	177	Ben Starav		1,078	446	3,537	1,463
84	91	Beinn Sheasgarnaich		1,077	579	3,535	1,900
85	268	Beinn Dorain		1,076	332	3,530	1,089
86	1619	Stuc Bheag		1,075	48	3,527	157
87	1321	An Tudair		1,074	66	3,524	217
88	772	Stob Coire Sgreamhach		1,072	128	3,517	420
89	1682	Puist Coire Ardair		1,071	45	3,514	148
90	454	Beinn a' Ghlo - Braigh Coire Chruinn-bhalgain		1,070	222	3,510	730
91	497	Meall Corranaich		1,069	202	3,507	663
92	486	An Socach		1,069	207	3,507	679
93	56	Sgurr Fhuaran		1,069	665	3,506	2,182
94	1234	Stob an Chul Choire		1,068	72	3,504	236
95	520	Glas Maol		1,068	194	3,504	636
96	828	Cairn of Claise		1,064	119	3,491	390
97	38	An Teallach - Bidein a' Ghlas Thuill		1,063	757	3,486	2,484
98	1522	Airgiod Bheinn		1,062	53	3,483	174
99	702	An Teallach - Sgurr Fiona		1,059	142	3,473	465
100	6	Liathach - Spidean a' Choire Leith		1,055	957	3,461	3,140

== See also ==
- Mountains and hills of Scotland
