= Stob Coire Easain =

Mountain in Scotland

Coordinates: 56°49′5″N 4°46′28″W

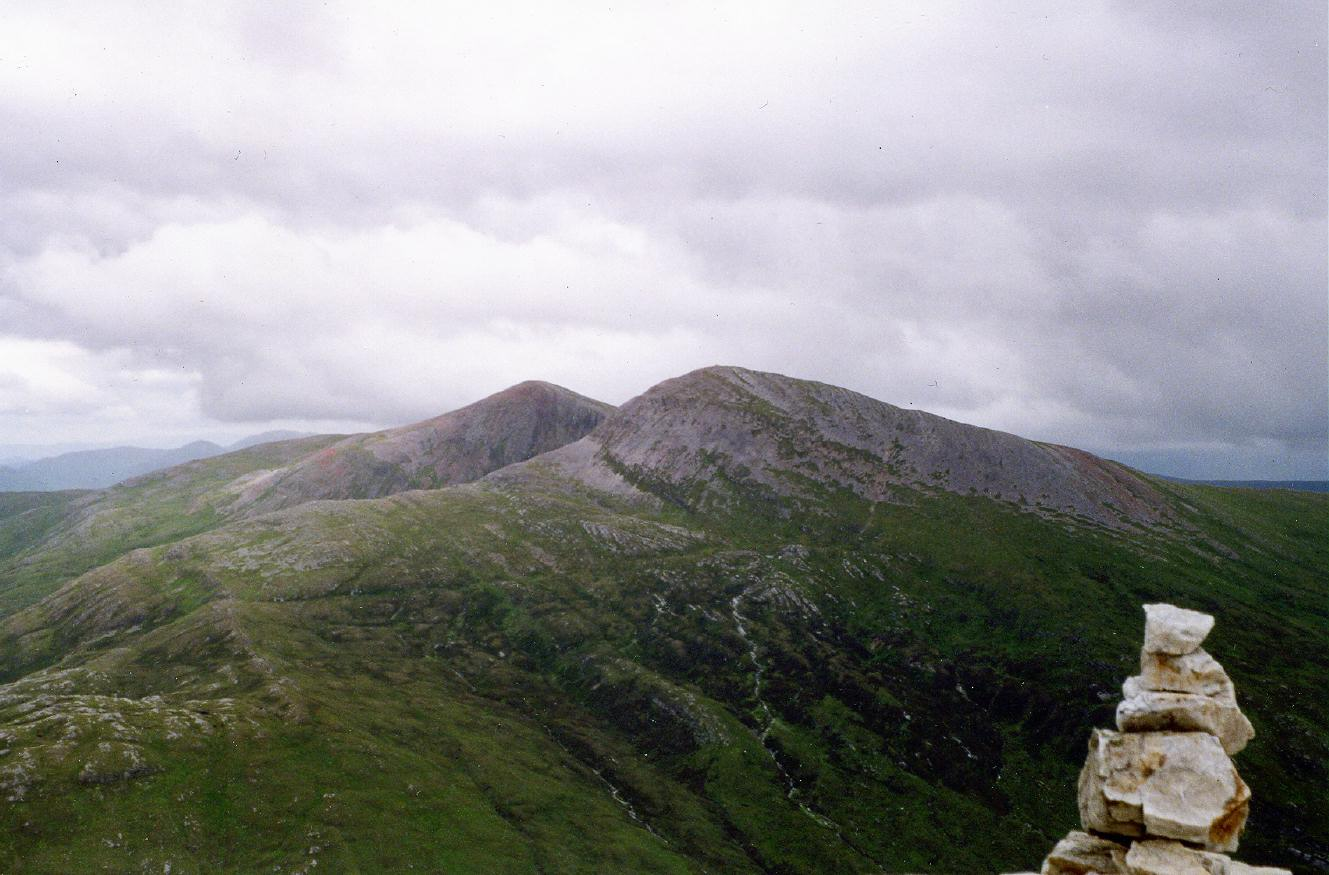
- The Twins. Stob Coire Easain in front with Stob a' Choire Mheadhoin behind seen from Stob Bàn, 4 km to the W

Highest point
- Elevation: 1,115 m (3,658 ft)
- Prominence: 611 m (2,005 ft)
- Parent peak: Ben Nevis
- Listing: Munro, Marilyn

Naming
- English translation: Peak of the Corrie of the Little Waterfall
- Language of name: Gaelic
- Pronunciation: Scottish Gaelic: [ˈs̪t̪op ˈkʰɔɾʲ ˈes̪ɛɲ] English approximation: STOP-kor-yə-ESS-en

Geography
- Location: Highland, Scotland
- Parent range: Grampians
- OS grid: NN307730
- Topo map: OS Landranger 41, OS Explorer 392

Stob Coire Easain is a Scottish Munro mountain which reaches a height of 1115 metres (3658 feet), situated 18 kilometres east of Fort William. It stands on the western side of Loch Treig, along with its "twin", the Munro Stob a' Choire Mheadhoin (1105 metres). Collectively the pair are called "The Easains" or the "Stob Corries" and stand just one kilometre apart connected by a high col with an approximate height of 965 metres. The fine corrie of Coire Easain Beag lies in between the two mountains facing north west. Stob Coire Easain’s name translates from the Gaelic as “Peak of the Corrie of the Little Waterfall”. This mountain should not be confused with another Stob Coire Easain, a Munro “Top” on the Munro Stob Coire an Laoigh.

The Easains stand in splendid isolation, hemmed in by valleys on three sides, giving Stob Coire Easain a substantial topographic prominence of 611 metres. The mountain is the highest point on a nine kilometre long ridge which runs the entire length of the western side of Loch Treig; the eastern side of this ridge drops very steeply to the waters of the loch. To the west of the mountain is the valley of the Allt na Lairig. A subsidiary ridge going north from the summit is initially steep and craggy as it descends to the head of Coire Laire. To the south of the summit the main ridge descends gently over Irlick Chaoile to the lonely country at the head of Loch Treig. All drainage from the mountain goes into the River Spean to find its way to the west coast of Scotland via Loch Linnhe.

Because of their close proximity, the Easains are usually climbed together with the best starting point being at the hamlet of Fersit (NN350784) where there is room to park a number of cars on the verges. The north east ridge of Stob a’ Choire Mheadhoin is followed to the summit; it is then a steep descent and climb across the stony col to the summit of Stob Coire Easain. An alternative walk utilises the West Highland Line, with the walker starting at Corrour railway station and traversing round the head of Loch Treig to gain the main ridge of the Easains, which can then be crossed south to north finishing at Fersit. Stob Coire Easain’s height and isolation give good views with the vista west over the Grey Corries and the Aonachs towards Ben Nevis being especially fine.

== See also ==
- Ben Nevis
- List of Munro mountains
- Mountains and hills of Scotland
