= An Socach =

A number of hills in Scotland are named An Socach:

- An Socach (Glen Ey), 944 m, listed as a Munro and a Marilyn
- An Socach (Glen Affric), 921 m, listed as a Munro
- An Socach (Glen Cannich), 1069 m, listed as a Munro and a Marilyn
- An Socach (Kinlochbervie), 362 m, listed as a Marilyn
