= Beinn Ghlas (disambiguation) =

Beinn Ghlas is a mountain on the shore of Loch Tay in Scotland.

Beinn Ghlas may also refer to:

- Beinn Ghlas (Inveraray), a Marilyn in the British Isles
- Beinn Ghlas (Oban), a Marilyn in the British Isles
- Beinn Ghlas (Lochgilphead), a Marilyn in the British Isles
