= Meall nan Tarmachan =

Mountain in Perth and Kinross, Scotland

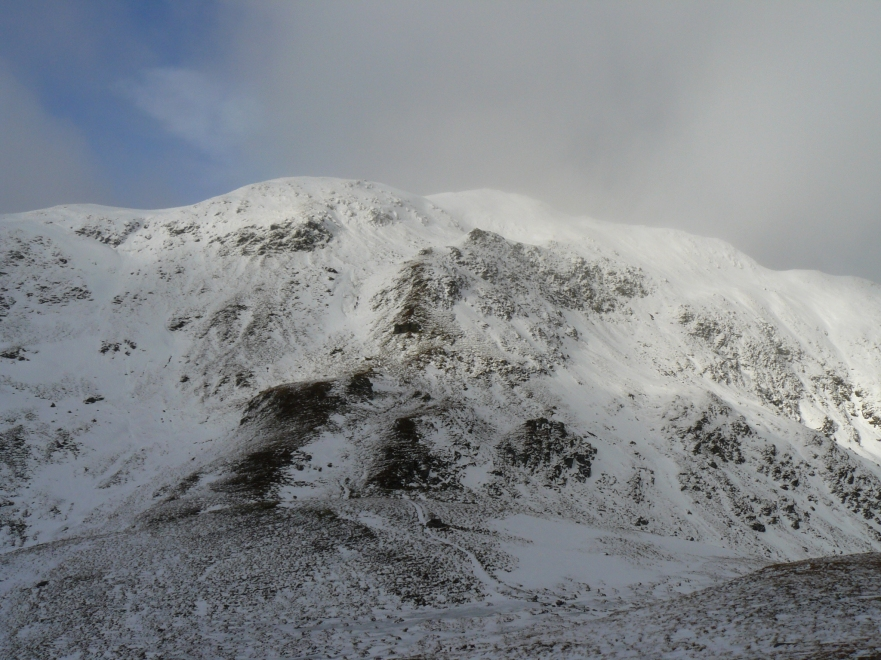
- Meall nan Tarmachan from the south.

Highest point
- Elevation: 1,043 m (3,422 ft)
- Prominence: 492 m (1,614 ft)
- Parent peak: Ben Lawers
- Listing: Munro, Marilyn

Naming
- English translation: Hill of the ptarmigans
- Language of name: Gaelic

Geography
- Location: Perth and Kinross, Scotland
- OS grid: NN585390
- Topo map: OS Landranger 51

Meall nan Tarmachan (Scottish Gaelic: [ˈmjaul̪ˠ nən̪ˠ ˈt̪aɾaməxan]) is a mountain in the Southern Highlands of Scotland near Killin just west of Ben Lawers. It is often climbed as part of the Tarmachan ridge, the other peaks of which are Meall Garbh (1026 m), Beinn nan Eachan (1000 m) and Creag na Caillich (914 m); these three peaks are Tops rather than Munros, and lie to the south-west of Meall nan Tarmachan.

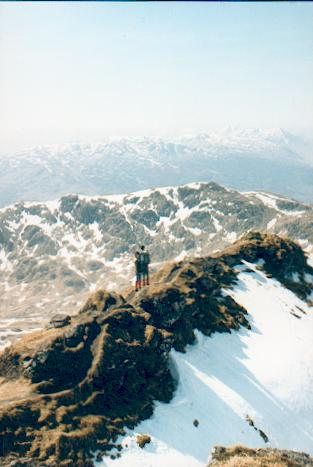
The main ridge of Meall nan Tarmachan

It is normally approached from the east via the road heading north from the Ben Lawers visitors centre. From the Ben Lawers visitors centre the summit is only a short walk, with no real difficulties. Traversing the entire Tarmachan ridge does however involve some scrambling.

== Etymology ==
The name Meall nan Tarmachan is Gaelic for "mound of the ptarmigans".

Regarding the other peaks in the Tarmachan ridge, Meal Garbh (translates to "rough lump") and Beinn nan Eachan ("mountain of horses") are classified as munro tops due to lack of sufficient separation. Creag na Caillich ("crag of the old woman") does not qualify as a munro top (despite previous inclusions to the list) as it is 2999.7ft tall, 0.3 ft under the 3000ft criteria.

== History ==
On the slopes of Creag na Caillich is the site of a Neolithic stone axe workshop. This site has only a limited survey but such sites are rare in the UK.

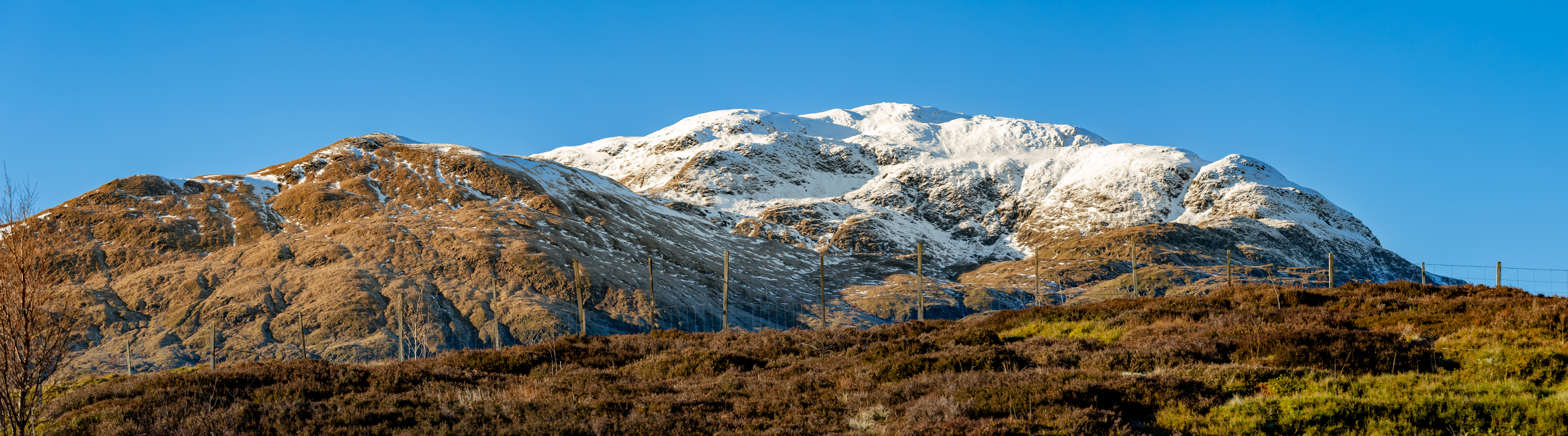
Panorama of Meall nan Tarmachan

== Aerial Cableway ==
From 1951 to 1961, there was an aerial cableway on the South East shoulder of Meall nan Tarmachan. It was used to transport rock to build the Lawers Dam from stone quarried at Coire Fionn Lairige (56°30′26.0″N 4°19′05.6″W).

Remnants of the cableway are strewn across the hillside, including fragments of the iron rails and pylons, however some efforts were made to clear the remnants of the cableway at the time of dismantling.
