= Meall Greigh =

Coordinates: 56.56737°N 4.15956°W

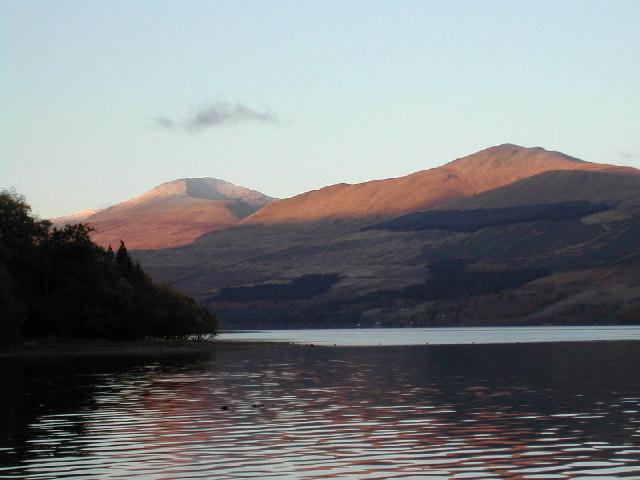
- Ben Lawers (left) and Meall Greigh (right) above Loch Tay, November 2003

Highest point
- Elevation: 1,001 m (3,284 ft)
- Listing: Munro, Marilyn

Naming
- English translation: Hill of the Horse Studs
- Language of name: Gaelic
- Pronunciation: Scottish Gaelic: [ˈmjaul̪ˠ ˈkɾʲe]

Geography
- Location: Perth and Kinross, Scotland
- OS grid: NN674438
- Topo map: OS Landranger 51

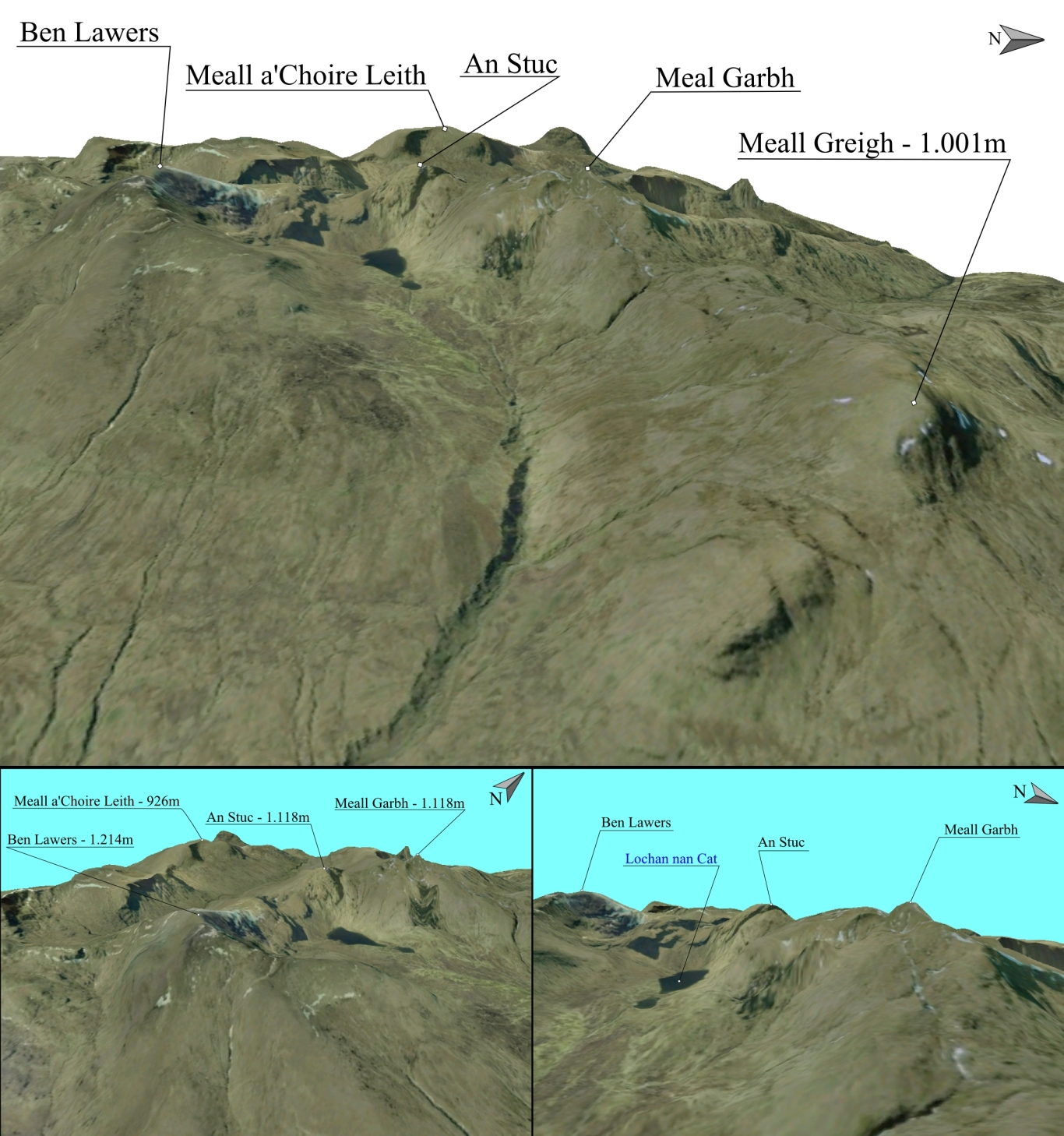
Meall Greigh 3D map

Meall Greigh is a mountain in the southern part of the Scottish Highlands. With Meall Garbh it forms the north-eastern end of the Ben Lawers range.
