= Loch Rannoch and Glen Lyon National Scenic Area =

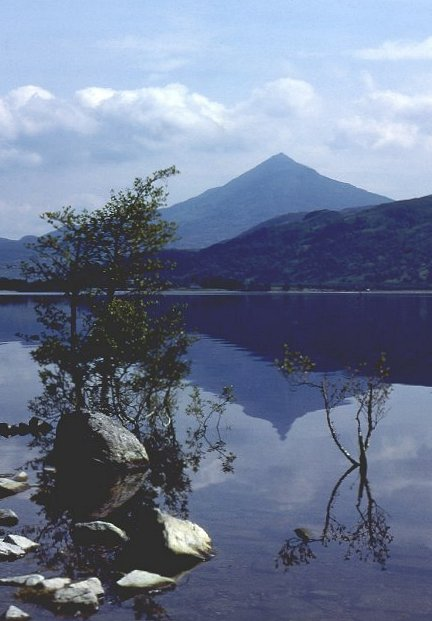
- Looking across Loch Rannoch towards Schiehallion

- Location within Perth and Kinross
- Location: Perth and Kinross and Stirling (council area), Scotland
- Coordinates: 56°40′59″N 4°18′50″W
- Area: 486 km^{2} (188 sq mi)
- Established: 1981
- Governing body: NatureScot

The Loch Rannoch and Glen Lyon National Scenic Area is a national scenic area (NSA) covering the area surrounding Loch Rannoch, Glen Lyon, and the Ben Lawers ranges of mountains in Scotland. It is one of 40 such areas in Scotland, which are defined so as to identify areas of exceptional scenery and to ensure its protection from inappropriate development by restricting certain forms of development. The Loch Rannoch and Glen Lyon NSA covers 48,625 ha, most of which lies in the council area of Perth and Kinross, with a small portion lying in Stirling.

National scenic areas are primarily designated due to the scenic qualities of an area, however NSAs may well have other special qualities, for example related to culture, history, archaeology, geology or wildlife. Areas with such qualities may be protected via other national and international designations that overlap with the NSA designation. Loch Rannoch and Glen Lyon includes a National nature reserve at Ben Lawers, and there are three Special Areas of Conservation and one Special Protection Area within the NSA.

== Creation of the national scenic area ==
Following the Second World War, a committee, chaired by Sir Douglas Ramsay, was established to consider preservation of the landscape in Scotland. The report, published in 1945 proposed that five areas (Loch Lomond and the Trossachs, the Cairngorms, Glen Coe-Ben Nevis-Black Mount, Wester Ross and Glen Strathfarrar-Glen Affric-Glen Cannich) should receive a level of protection. The government therefore designated these areas as "national park direction areas", giving powers for planning decisions taken by local authorities to be reviewed by central government. Following a further review of landscape protection in 1978, additional areas, including the hills and glens to the east of Rannoch Moor, were identified as worthy of protection due to their landscape qualities. Accordingly, in 1981 the direction areas were replaced by the national scenic area designation, which were based on the 1978 recommendations and thus included the area entitled Loch Rannoch and Glen Lyon. The defined area remains as originally mapped in 1978, but was redesignated under new legislation in 2010.

Although the national scenic area designation provides a degree of additional protection via the planning process, there are no bodies equivalent to a national park authority, and whilst local authorities (in this case Perth and Kinross Council and Stirling Council) can produce a management strategy for each one, only the three national scenic areas within Dumfries and Galloway have current management strategies.

== Geography ==
Main articles: Ben Lawers, Loch Rannoch and Glen Lyon

The designated area covers much of the historical province of Breadalbane, and covers landscapes ranging from flat, fertile farmland up to exposed mountain summits. Ben Lawers, at 1214 m, is the highest point in the highest and most extensive mountain massif in the southern part of the Scottish Highlands. Schiehallion, an isolated peak lying in the east of the NSA, is one of the most prominent mountains in Scotland.

The area is drained by two tributaries of the River Tay: the River Tummel (which drains Loch Rannoch) and the River Lyon, which flows through Glen Lyon. Most human settlement and activity has been concentrated along these two rivers; many of the smaller side glens also contain visible signs of previous occupations, for example in the presence of old shielings. The area contains fragments of the ancient Caledonian pinewood, along with areas of native birchwood.

== Other conservation designations ==
There are a number of other protected areas that overlap to some extent with the national scenic area.

- Ben Lawers has been designated as a National nature reserve since 1964. It is protected due to the presence of many rare and endangered arctic–alpine plant species, and has been owned by the National Trust for Scotland since 1950. Ben Lawers is also a Special Area of Conservation (SAC), again due to the presence of arctic-alpine flora.
- The rivers Lyon and Tummel are both tributaries of the River Tay, and as such form part of the River Tay SAC. The designation notes the river system's importance for salmon, otters, brook lampreys, river lampreys and sea lampreys.
- The Black Wood of Rannoch, a fragment of Caledonian Forest which lies on the southern short of Loch Rannoch, is also designated as an SAC.
- Loch Finnart, which lies to the south Loch Rannoch at a height of 280 m above sea level, is protected as part of the Rannoch Lochs SPA, due to its importance to breeding black-throated divers.
