= An Stùc =

Mountain in Perth and Kinross, Scotland

Coordinates: 56.56044°N 4.21612°W

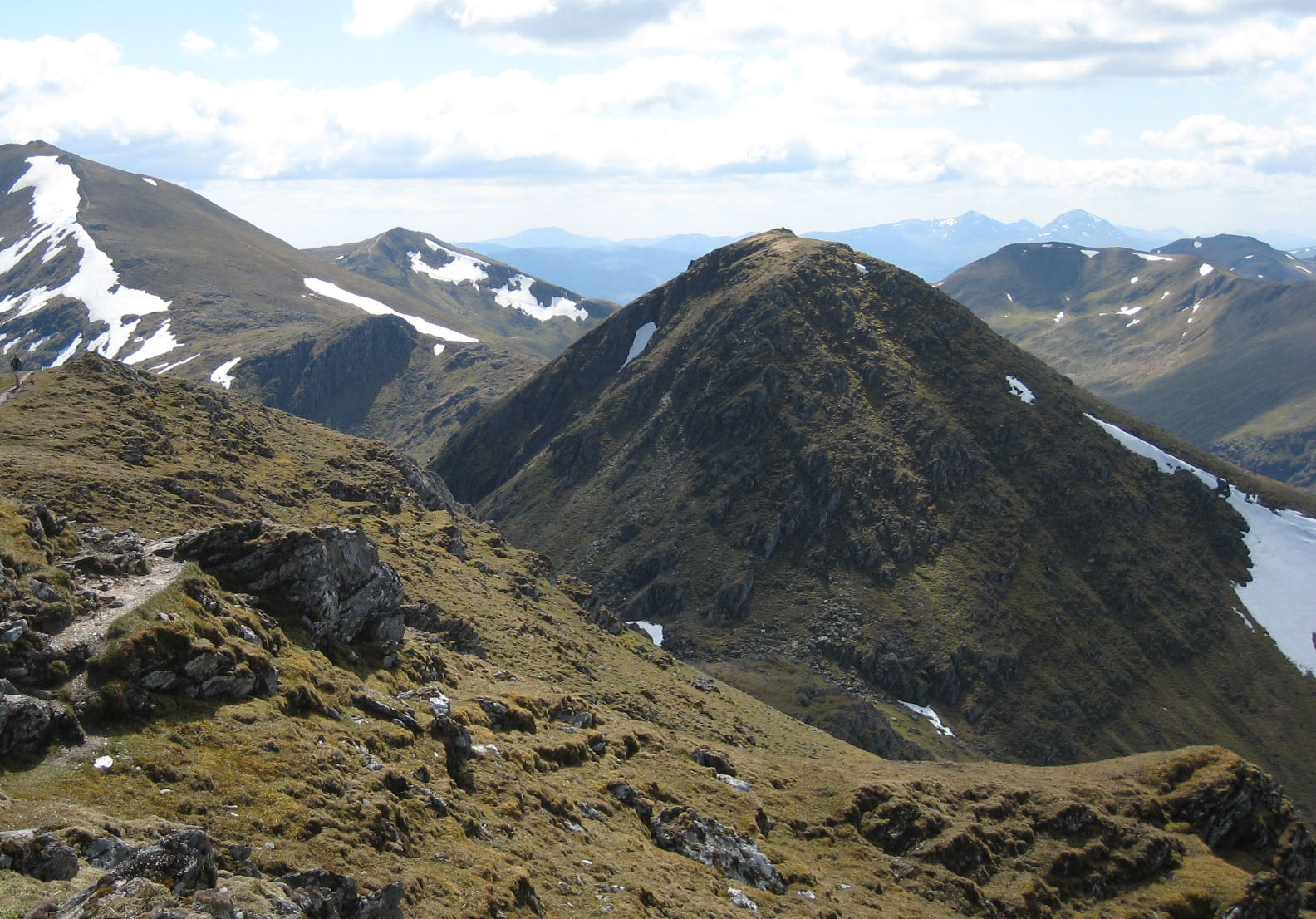
- An Stùc from Meall Garbh

Highest point
- Elevation: 1,118 m (3,668 ft)
- Prominence: 127 m (417 ft)
- Listing: Munro

Naming
- Language of name: Gaelic
- Pronunciation: Scottish Gaelic: [ən̪ˠˈs̪t̪uxk]

Geography
- Location: Perth and Kinross, Scotland
- OS grid: NN63904314
- Topo map: OS Landranger 51

Climbing
- Easiest route: Hike

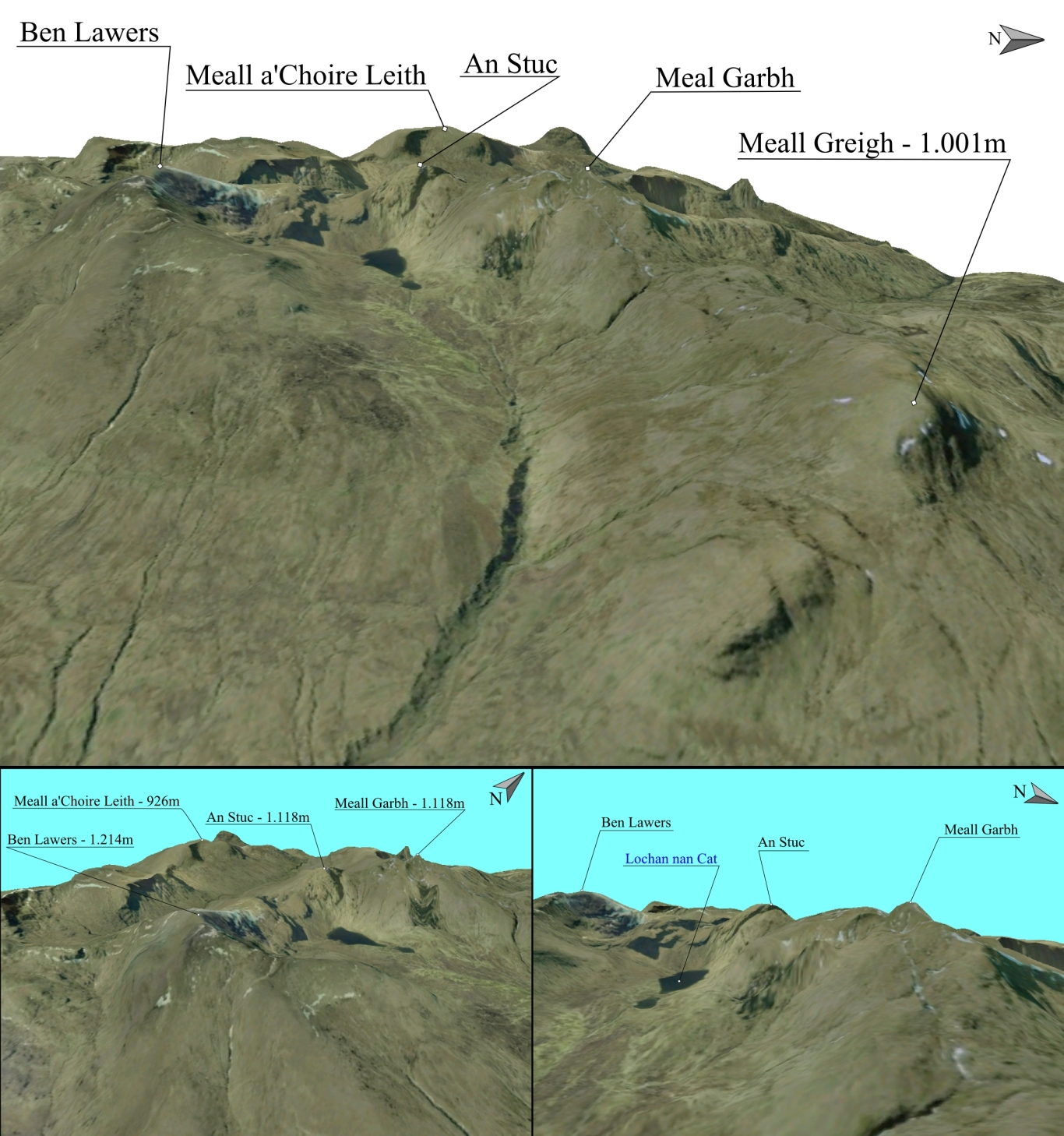
An Stuc 3D map

An Stùc, meaning "The Peak" in Gaelic, is a conically shaped Scottish mountain in the Ben Lawers range to the north of Loch Tay. It has been listed as a Munro since 1997, having previously been considered a subsidiary top of the Ben Lawers range. It lies on the main ridge of the Ben Lawers range, and its southern and eastern slopes form part of the Ben Lawers National Nature Reserve, which is owned and managed by the National Trust for Scotland.

The normal routes of ascent are via the ridges from Ben Lawers or Meall Garbh, in combination with other summits in the range. It may also be ascended directly from the Lawers Burn to the east via a gully above Lochan nan Cat.

There is another An Stùc in Assynt, standing at 364 m (1,194 ft) about 26 kilometres (16 mi) northeast of Ullapool at the head of Glenoykel.

== See also ==
- Ben Nevis
- List of Munro mountains
- Mountains and hills of Scotland
