= Grey Corries =

Mountain range in the West Highlands, Scotland

Coordinates: 56.815°N 4.874°W

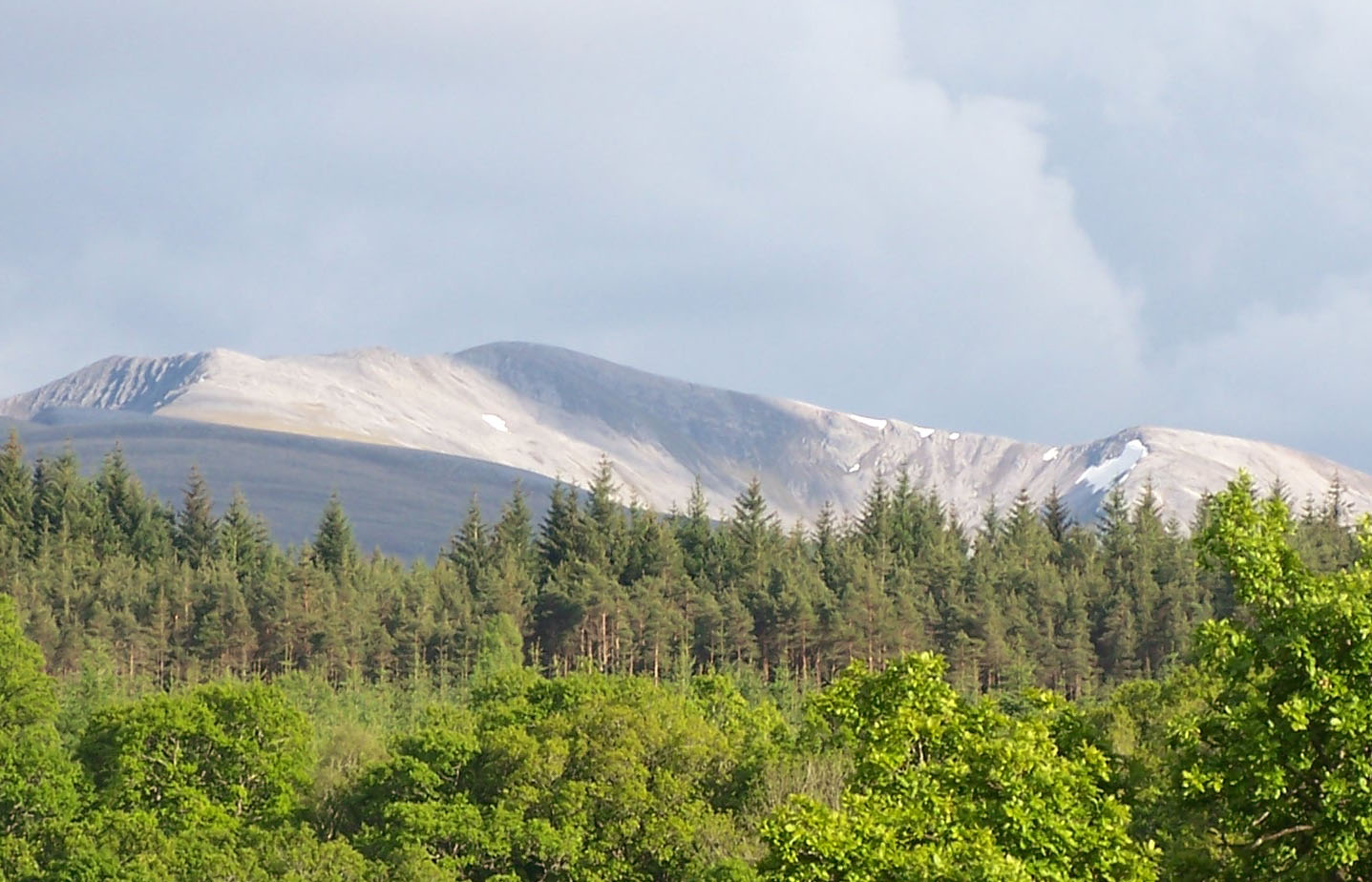
The Grey Corries viewed from the north

The Grey Corries are a range of mountains in the West Highlands of Scotland. The range includes several of Scotland's highest peaks including a number of Munros. The range is bounded to the north by the great extent of Leanachan Forest beyond which is Glen Spean and the Great Glen, to the east by the defile of Lairig Leacach and to the south by upper Glen Nevis and the headwaters of the Abhainn Rath. The ridge continues westwards at a high level to join Aonach Beag, Aonach Mor, Carn Mor Dearg and Ben Nevis.

From west to east the principal peaks of the range are Sgurr Choinnich Beag (963 m (3,159 ft)), Sgurr Choinnich Mor (1,094 m (3,589 ft)), Stob Coire Easain (1,080 m (3,540 ft)), Stob Coire an Laoigh (1,116 m (3,661 ft)), Caisteal (1,106 m (3,629 ft)), Stob Coire Cath na Sine (1,079 m (3,540 ft)), Stob a' Choire Leith (1,105 m (3,625 ft)), Stob Choire Claurigh (the highest peak of the range at 1,177 m (3,862 ft)) and Stob Coire na Ceannan (1,123 m (3,684 ft)). Stob Coire Gaibhre (958 m (3,143 ft)) lies to the north of the eastern end of the range whilst Stob Ban (977 m (3,205 ft)) lies to the south of the ridge's eastern end. A northern spur of Stob Coire Easain culminates in Beinn na Socaich (1,007 m (3,304 ft)m).
