= Stob a' Choire Mheadhoin =

Mountain in Scotland

Coordinates: 56°49′26″N 4°45′37″W

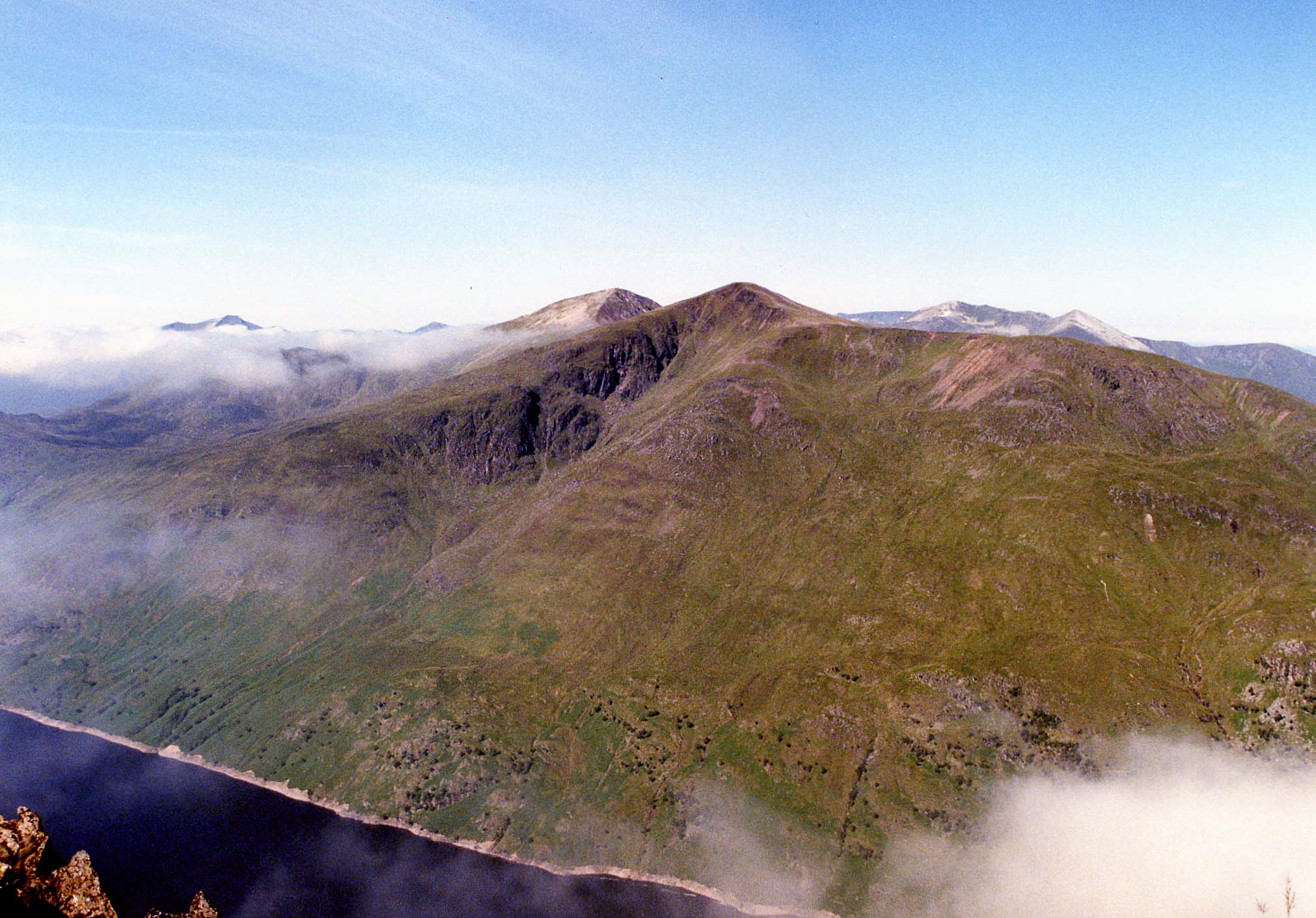
- Stob a' Choire Mheadhoin seen across Loch Treig from Stob Coire Sgriodain, four km to the east. The crags of Coire Meadhon are in view. The summit of Stob Coire Easain can be seen to the left

Highest point
- Elevation: 1,105 m (3,625 ft)
- Prominence: 140 m
- Parent peak: Stob Coire Easain
- Listing: Munro

Naming
- English translation: Peak of the Middle Corrie
- Language of name: Gaelic
- Pronunciation: Scottish Gaelic: [ˈs̪t̪op ə ˈxɔɾʲə ˈviə.ɛɲ]

Geography
- Location: Lochaber, Highland, Scotland
- Parent range: Grampians
- OS grid: NN316736
- Topo map: OS Landranger 41, OS Explorer 392

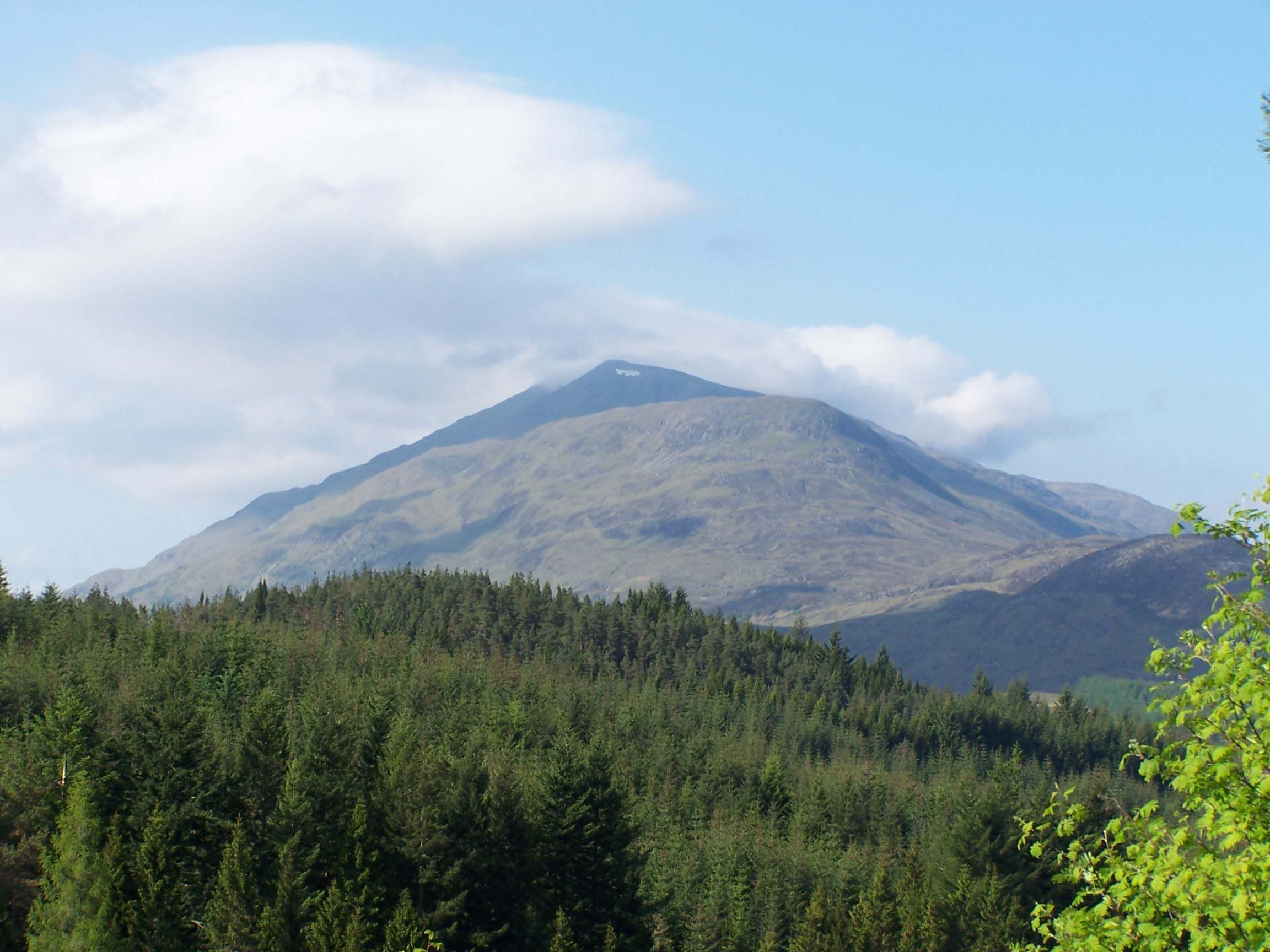
Stob a' Choire Mheadhoin seen from the Laggan Dam looks conical and solitary.

Stob a' Choire Mheadhoin is a mountain in the Scottish Highlands, it is situated 19 km east of Fort William in the Lochaber area of the Highland council area.

== Overview ==
Stob a' Choire Mheadhoin reaches a height of 1105 metres (3625 feet), making it one of the higher Munros. It is closely associated with the adjoining peak of Stob Coire Easain which is just 10 metres higher and stands one km to the SW across a high col with a height of approximately 965 metres. The two are usually climbed together and have the informal nicknames of “The Easains” or “The Stob Coires”.

Some people regard Stob a' Choire Mheadhoin as fortunate to be regarded as a separate mountain rather than a subsidiary “top” of Stob Coire Easain. The hill was not named on older maps, being shown as unnamed summit. However its dominating presence above Glen Spean presumably led to its Munro status, which it has held ever since the first publication of Munro's Tables in 1891. The best views of Stob a' Choire Mheadhoin are from the NE from where it is seen as a separate mountain. From the Laggan Dam it appears as a conical peak, while from Stob Coire Sgriodain on the opposite side of Loch Treig, the mountain shows the steep slopes which fall into the loch and its impressive craggy Coire Meadhon which gives the mountain its name which translates as “Peak of the Middle Corrie“.

== Geography ==
Stob a' Choire Mheadhoin has a long NE ridge which descends for over five km to the hamlet of Fersit at the head of Loch Treig. This ridge is the most common route of ascent and though mostly a moderate gradient it does have several steep sections, most notably the rocky climb up to Meall Cian Dearg which requires some mild scrambling. The mountains eastern flank falls steeply to Loch Treig with the slope rising from loch side to summit for 850 metres and an average gradient of over 30 degrees. These slopes are well seen when travelling on the West Highland Railway on the east side of the loch.

A ridge goes SW from the summit to connect to the mountains twin Munro of Stob Coire Easain, this ridge hugs the lip of the impressive Coire Easain Beag which stands between the two mountains. This corrie has patches of red rock on its upper slopes especially on its Stob a' Choire Mheadhoin side, a point on the ridge at the head of the corrie is actually named Càrn Dearg (Red Cairn) on the OS map. There are several corries on the eastern side of the mountain, the most impressive of these by far is Coire Meadhon which falls directly from the summit with steep crags on its southern side. The northern slopes of the mountain descend into Coire Laire which is drained by the Allt Laire which goes north to join the River Spean as does all rainfall from the mountain.

== Ascents ==
The most popular starting point for the ascent of Stob a' Choire Mheadhoin is the small hamlet of Fersit at grid reference NN350784, from there the long NE ridge can be accessed and followed to the summit. An alternative ascent can be made from Corrour railway station utilising the West Highland Railway. This is a long walk of around 30 km and involves a substantial hike in from the station around the head of Loch Treig to reach the foot of Stob Coire Easain which is climbed first before continuing over Stob a' Choire Mheadhoin to reach Tulloch railway station for the evening train.

== See also ==
- Ben Nevis
- List of Munro mountains
- Mountains and hills of Scotland
