= Sgùrr nan Conbhairean =

Mountain in the Northwest Highlands, Scotland

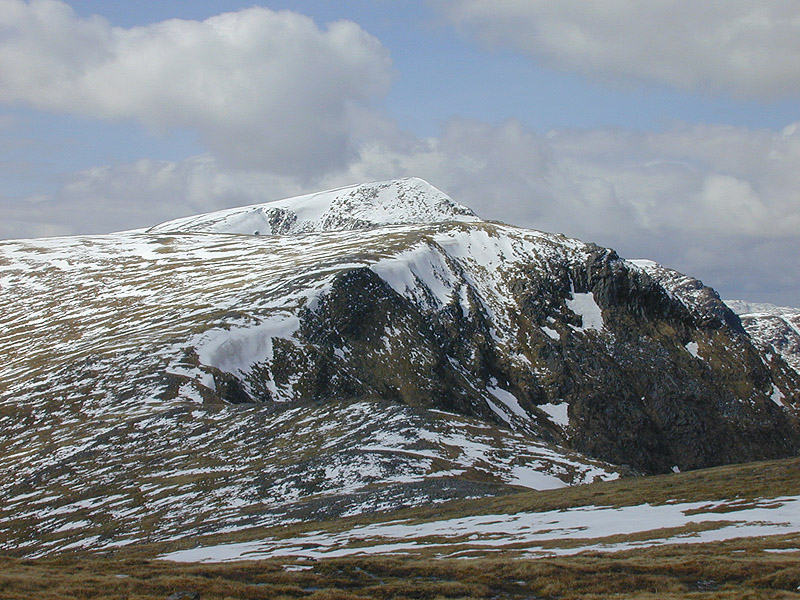
- Sgùrr nan Conbhairean from Carn Ghluasaid

Highest point
- Elevation: 1,109 m (3,638 ft)
- Prominence: 382 m (1,253 ft)
- Listing: Munro, Marilyn
- Coordinates: 57°10′39.1″N 05°05′43.33″W

Geography
- Location: Inverness-shire, Scotland
- Parent range: Northwest Highlands
- OS grid: NH12991388
- Topo map: OS Landranger 34

Sgùrr nan Conbhairean (Scottish Gaelic for 'peak of the dog-men') is a mountain in the Northwest Highlands of Scotland, lying north of Loch Cluanie and south of Glen Affric. A dome-shaped mountain with a height of 1,109 metres (3,638 ft), it is part of a group of three Munros, the other two being A' Chràlaig and Mullach Fraoch-choire.

Its Gaelic name likely refers to the handlers of hunting dogs.

== See also ==
- List of Munro mountains
- Mountains and hills of Scotland
