= A' Chràlaig =

Mountain in Scotland

A' Chralaig
- A' Chràileag
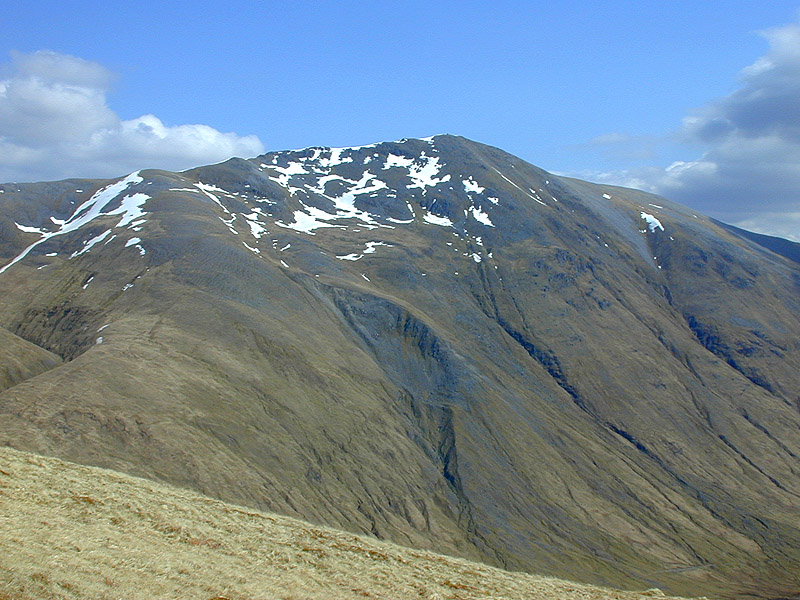
- A' Chralaig from the northwest

Highest point
- Elevation: 1,120 m (3,670 ft)
- Prominence: 786 m (2,579 ft); Ranked 38th in British Isles
- Parent peak: Carn Eige
- Listing: Munro, Marilyn
- Coordinates: 57°11′5″N 05°09′16″W

Naming
- English translation: the basket
- Language of name: Gaelic
- Pronunciation: Scottish Gaelic: [əˈxɾaːl̪ˠɛkʲ] English approximation: ə-KHRAH-lek

Geography
- Location within Highland
- Location: Highland, Scotland
- Parent range: Northwest Highlands
- OS grid: NH094148
- Topo map: OS Landranger 33 / 34

Geology
- Mountain type: mountain

A' Chralaig (Scottish Gaelic: A' Chràileag) is a mountain in the Northwest Highlands of Scotland, north of Loch Cluanie and south of Glen Affric. It is a Munro with a height of 1,120 metres (3,670 ft). It is the highest peak along Glen Shiel and can be easily climbed from the Cluanie Inn on the A87. The eastern slopes of the mountain, are owned by the Forestry Commission and are part of the Kintail National Scenic Area.

Despite being the highest peak on the ridge, it is considered less interesting than the route over Stob Coire na Cràlaig to the nearby Mullach Fraoch-choire. These two peaks may be combined with the neighbouring peaks of Sgurr nan Conbhairean and Sail Chaorainn to make the so-called "Cluanie Horseshoe", although no path connects A' Chràlaig with the peaks to the east.

Cluanie Horseshoe

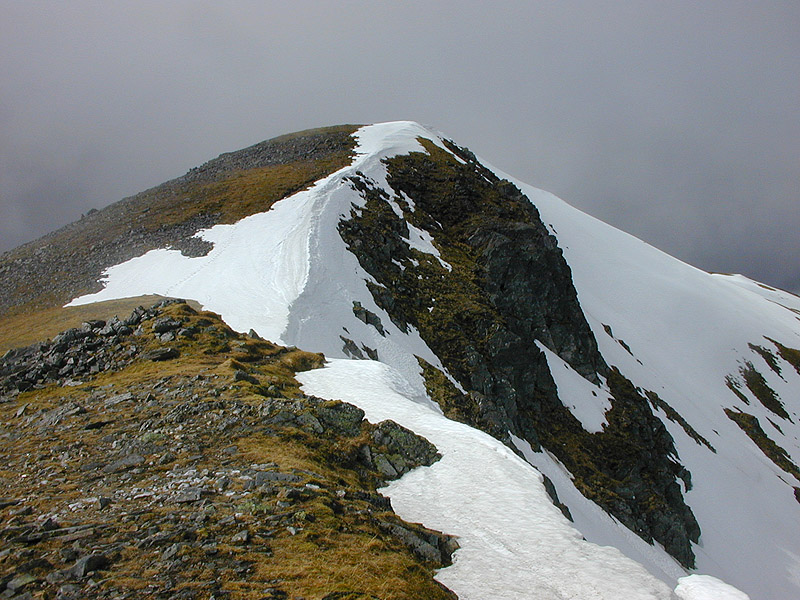
Summit from south ridge

== See also ==
- List of Munro mountains
- Mountains and hills of Scotland
