= Mullach Fraoch-choire =

Mountain in Scotland

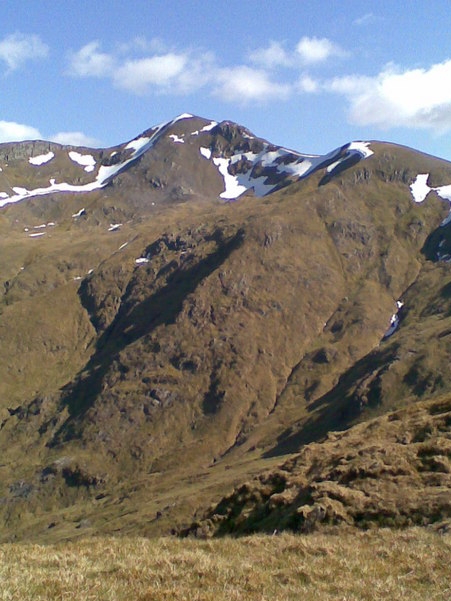
- Mullach Fraoch-choire from its northwest ridge

Highest point
- Elevation: 1,102 m (3,615 ft)
- Prominence: 153 m (502 ft)
- Parent peak: A' Chràlaig
- Listing: Munro, Marilyn
- Coordinates: 57°12′19″N 05°09′20″W

Naming
- English translation: heather-corrie peak
- Language of name: Gaelic

Geography
- Location within Highland
- Location: Highland, Scotland
- Parent range: Northwest Highlands
- OS grid: NH094171
- Topo map(s): OS Landranger 33 / 34; Explorer 415

Mullach Fraoch-choire is a 1,102-metre (3,615 ft) mountain – a Munro – in the Northwest Highlands of Scotland on a ridge extending north for 8 kilometres (5.0 mi) between Loch Cluanie in Glenmoriston and upper Glen Affric. It is within the Glen Affric National Scenic Area and Glen Affric National Nature Reserve.

== Geographical situation ==
Mullach Fraoch-choire is located south of upper Glen Affric and north of Loch Cluanie at the head of Glenmoriston as the valley continues west to become Glen Shiel and Kintail. The mountain is one of the four Munros on the "Cluanie Horseshoe", (Note: The other three Munros are A' Chràlaig, Sgurr nan Conbhairean and Sail Chaorainn.) a crescent of high peaks which also includes nine Munro Tops. It lies on the western arm of the horseshoe which loops around Gleann na Ciche whose burns flow north to the River Affric. West of the horseshoe is a deep glen connecting Cluanie and Affric – south of its watershed is An Caorran Mor with its stream flowing south to Loch Cluanie while to the north Allt a' Chomhlain flows north to the River Affric. Mullach Fraoch-choire has a subsidiary Top on its northeast ridge at 1,047 metres (3,435 ft). Somewhat beyond the lowest col on its south ridge is Stob Coire na Chràlaig at 1,008 metres (3,307 ft) which is regarded as a subsidiary peak of A' Chràlaig although it is more distant from the latter peak.

== Walking routes ==
From the north the mountain may be climbed from the very remote Glen Affric Youth Hostel at Alltbeithe or, from the south, from near Cluanie Inn on the A87 beside Loch Cluanie. The horseshoe is most conveniently traversed starting from Glen Affric but the nearest public road to the youth hostel is, in fact, by Loch Cluanie.

From Cluanie a frequently used route climbs A' Chràlaig first and then traverses the ridge north from there. This involves something of a scramble around several pinnacles with steep drops on both sides – to Coire na Geurdain on the east and Coire Odhar on the west. The last half-kilometre of the ridge before reaching Mullach Fraoch-Choire is spectacularly narrow and in winter it becomes a Scottish Grade I climb. A return may be made by using the outward route or by descending Coire Odhar from the col near Stob Coire na Chràlaig.

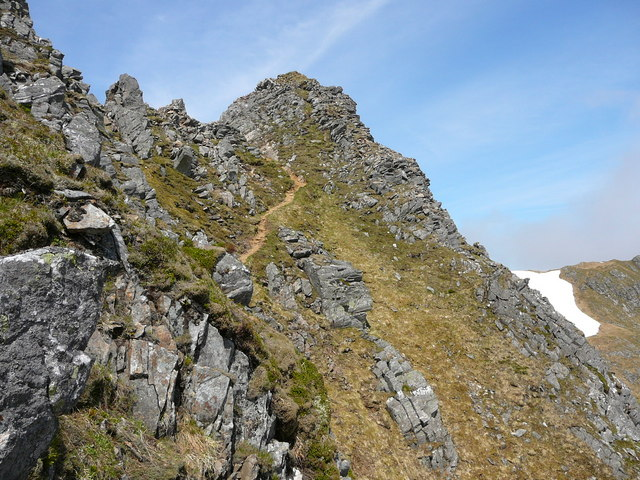
Approaching Mullach Fraoch-choire on the ridge from Stob Coire na Chràlaig

Cluanie Horseshoe

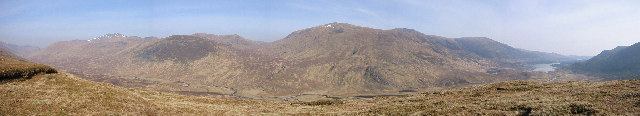
View north to upper Glen Affric from Mullach Fraoch-choire northeast ridge with Sgurr nan Ceathreamhnan to the left and Loch Affric to the right
