= Stob Choire Claurigh =

Mountain in Scotland

Coordinates: 56°49′26″N 4°50′54″W

- Stob Coire Chlamhraidh
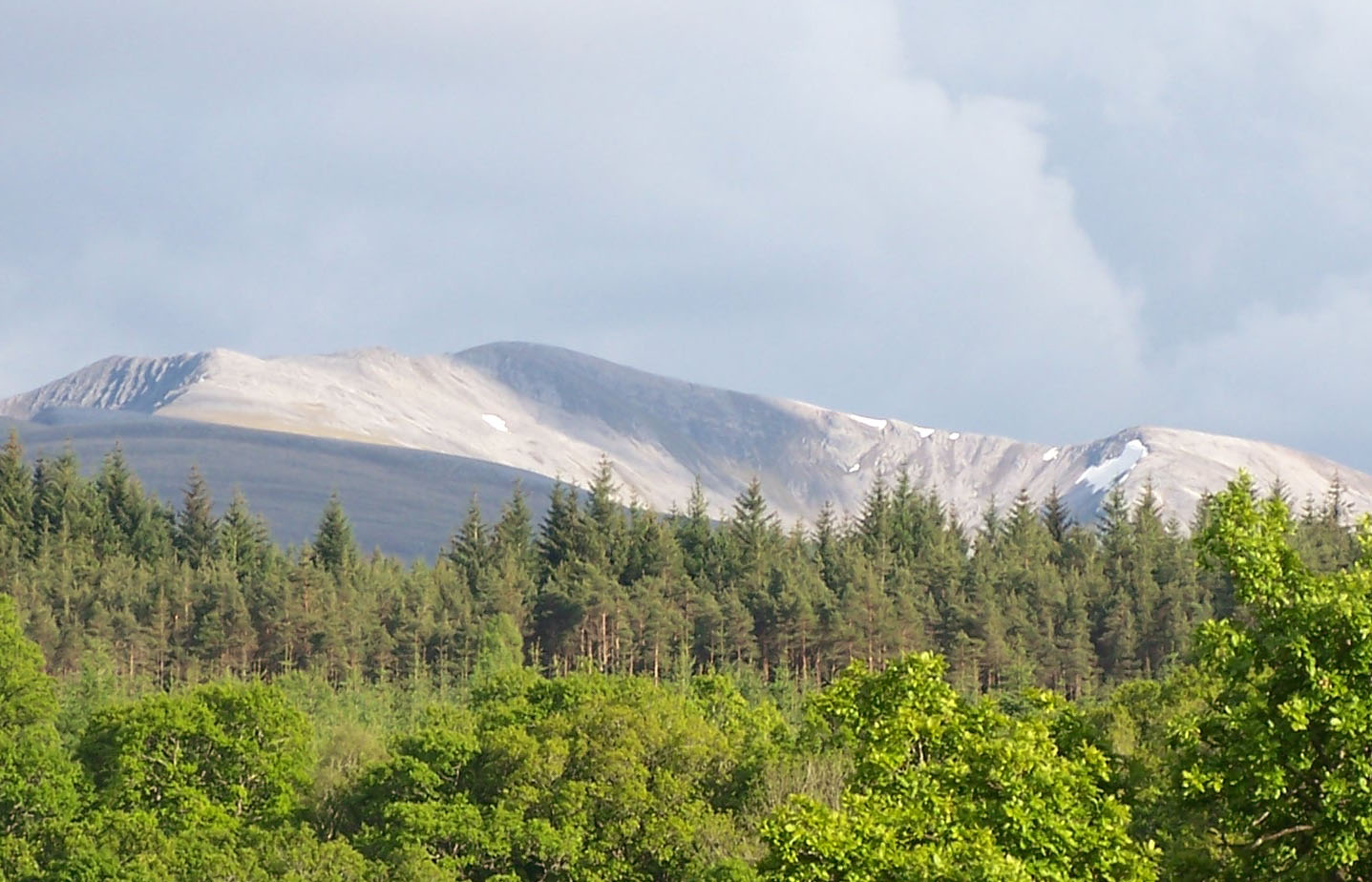
- Stob Choire Claurigh above the Leanachan Forest. Seen from the north.

Highest point
- Elevation: 1,177 m (3,862 ft)
- Prominence: 446 m (1,463 ft)
- Listing: Munro, Marilyn

Naming
- Language of name: Gaelic
- Pronunciation: Scottish Gaelic: [ˈs̪t̪op ˈxɔɾʲə ˈkl̪ˠãũɾɪ] English approximation: stop-KHOR-yə-KLOW-ree

Geography
- Location: Highland, Scotland
- Parent range: Grey Corries
- OS grid: NN262738
- Topo map: OS Landranger 41, OS Explorer 392

Listed summits of Stob Choire Claurigh
Name	Grid ref	Height	Status
Stob Coire na Ceannain	NN267745	1123 m (3684 ft)	Munro Top
Stob a’ Choire Lèith	NN256736	1105 m (3625 ft)	Munro Top
Stob Coire na Gaibhre	NN261757	958 m (3143 ft)	Munro Top

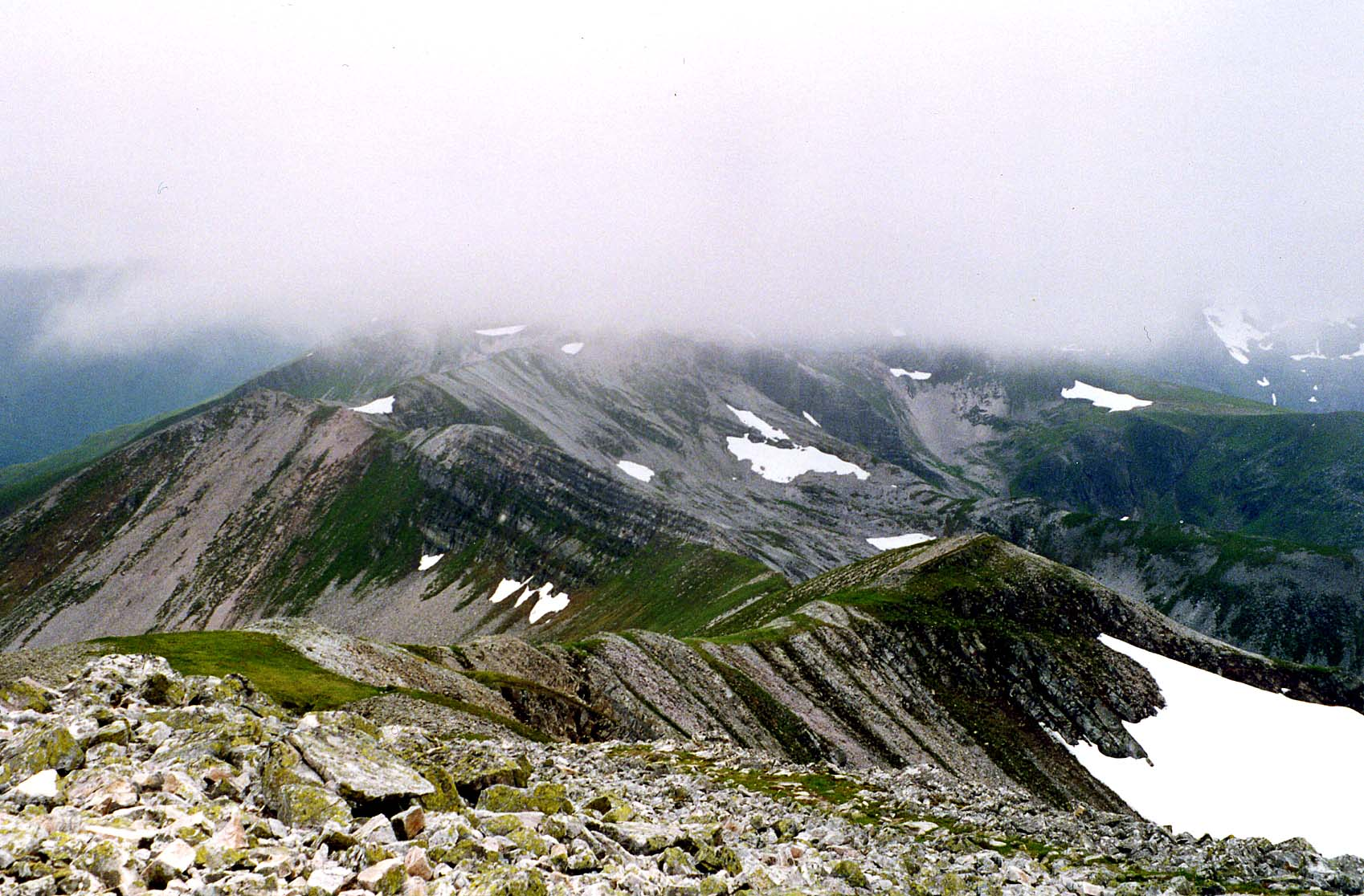
Looking SW from the summit along the Grey Corries ridge with the weather closing in.

Stob Choire Claurigh (Scottish Gaelic: Stob Coire Chlamhraidh) is a mountain in Lochaber in the Scottish Highlands, with a height of 1,177 metres (3,862 ft). It is part of the Grey Corries, near Ben Nevis, and lies about 16 km (10 mi) east of Fort William. It is described as one of the best ridge walks on the Scottish mainland.

== Overview ==
Stob Choire Claurigh stands in the Grey Corries, a group of mountains strung out along an eight km long ridge which never falls below the 800 metre (2,600 ft) contour and includes twelve summits, four of which reach Munro status. Stob Choire Claurigh is the highest of the Grey Corries reaching a height of 1,177 metres (3,862 ft). The upper part of the mountain and the main section of the ridge is composed of pale grey quartzite rocks and scree making an eye-catching sight which is well seen from the villages of Spean Bridge and Roybridge and the A86 road which runs between them.

The mountain's name has been translated from Gaelic as "peak of the brawling corrie", taken from the verb clamhras which means clamoring or brawling. The name may refer to the roaring of the many stags in the corries of the mountain during the breeding season.

== Geography ==
Stob Choire Claurigh is a substantial mountain which includes four subsidiary tops (three of which are listed in the 1997 edition of Munro's Tables), four high corries and long, forested, northern slopes which descend to the valley of the River Spean. Three main ridges radiate from the summit. The northern ridge descends for two km to the “Munro Top” of Stob Coire Gaibhre (958 metres) continuing for a further two km to the Forestry Commission owned Leanachan Forest where it broadens into the Spean valley. Four hundred metres from the summit on the northern ridge is the North Top (1121 metres), at this point a spur goes east to the subsidiary summit of Stob Coire na Ceannain (1123 metres), offering easy scrambling. This eastern spur can be used as a means of ascent up rough, stony slopes from the Lairig Leachach pass.

The two other ridges link to adjacent Munros, with the south ridge connecting to Stob Ban, 1.5 km distant, over a col with a height of 803 metres. The twisting, high level SW ridge continues for three km over the “Munro Top” of Stob a’ Choire Lèith (1105 metres) to link to the Munro of Stob Coire an Laoigh. The four principal corries on the mountain are steep walled, holding snow well into the spring with streams which rise at around the 1000 metre mark, they drain in various directions but all eventually feed the River Spean, reaching the west coast at Loch Linnhe.

== Ascents and view ==
The most popular starting point for the direct ascent of Stob Choire Claurigh is Corriechoille farm (grid reference NN251807) at the end of the minor road from Spean Bridge. The route follows the Lairig Leacach track through a short section of the Leanachan Forest, the track is left immediately after the forest and steep slopes are climbed on the right hand side to reach the north east ridge. The ridge is followed over Stob Coire Gaibhre and along the rim of Coire na Ceannain which gives airy views down to its circular lochan, to reach the summit which is marked by a pile of quartzite boulders. There is a fine view from the top, especially to the SW where there is a fine outlook of the switchbacks and tops of the Grey Corries ridge backed by Aonach Beag and Ben Nevis. Many walkers will continue SW along the Grey Corries ridge descending eventually by the north ridge of Stob Coire an Laoigh down to the forest and eventually Corriechoille.

== See also ==
- Ben Nevis
- List of Munro mountains
- Mountains and hills of Scotland
