= Stob Bàn (Grey Corries) =

Mountain in Scotland

Coordinates: 56°48′40″N 4°50′28″W

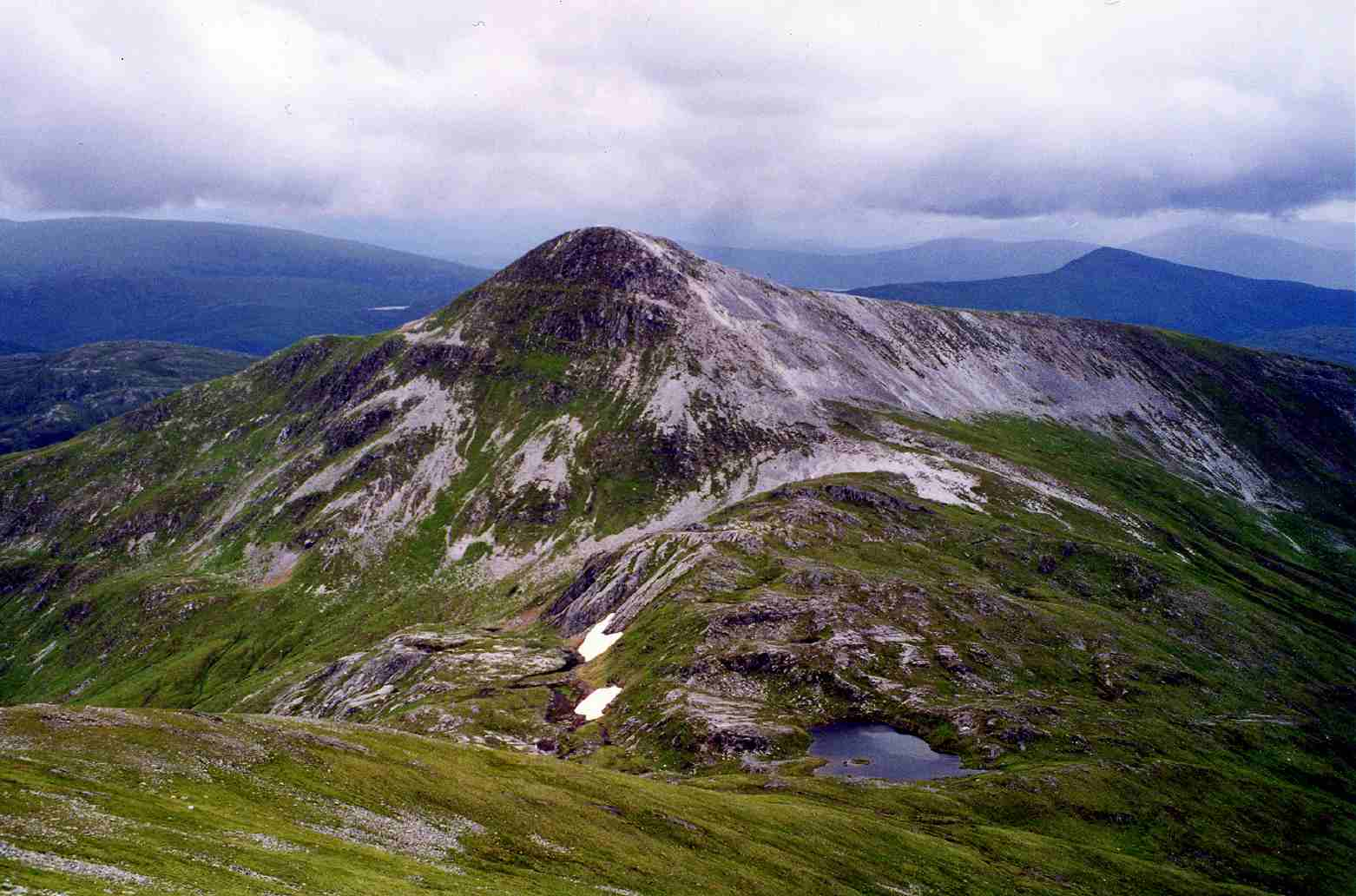
- Stob Bàn from the slopes of Stob Choire Claurigh across the 800 metre col.

Highest point
- Elevation: 977 m (3,205 ft)
- Prominence: 174 m (571 ft)
- Parent peak: Stob Choire Claurigh
- Listing: Munro, Marilyn

Naming
- English translation: White Peak
- Language of name: Gaelic
- Pronunciation: Scottish Gaelic: [ˈs̪t̪op ˈpaːn] English approximation: stop-BAHN

Geography
- Location: Highland, Scotland
- Parent range: Grey Corries
- OS grid: NN266724
- Topo map: OS Landranger 41, OS Explorer 392

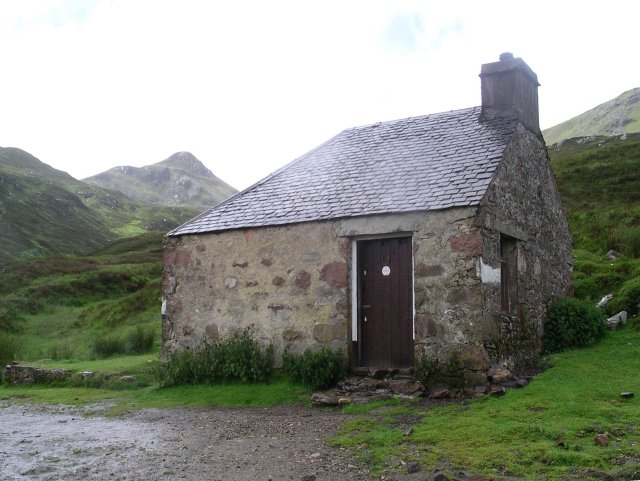
The Lairig Leacach bothy with the peak of Stob Bàn behind.

Stob Bàn is a mountain situated in the Lochaber region of Highland, Scotland, 16 kilometres east of Fort William. It reaches a height of 977 metres (3205 feet) and lies in a group of hills known as the Grey Corries which includes three other Munros and nine Munro "Tops" along an eight kilometre ridge. The mountain's name translate as "White Peak", while other sources give the translation as Light Coloured Peak with the hill being covered in light coloured schist scree, in contrast to the rest of the Grey Corries which are made up of grey quartzite scree. The mountain is a prominent conical shape, isolated from the rest of the group and distant from any main roads. It should not be confused with another Munro named Stob Bàn situated in the Mamores.

Stob Bàn lies south of the main Grey Corries ridge, connected to it and the highest mountain of the group, Stob Choire Claurigh, by an unnamed col with a height of 800 metres, this col has a small lochan also unnamed lying within it. Stob Bàn's conical shape is formed by three distinct ridges. The north eastern ridge drops to the valley of the Allt na Lairige which flows southerly into Loch Treig. The south western ridge is gentle in gradient dropping down to a col at 750 metres before rising to the subsidiary summit of Meall a' Bhuirich (841 metres) which stands two kilometres from the main summit. The northern ridge is steep and connects to the Munro of Stob Choire Claurigh with rough scree underfoot with some care needed by walkers traversing between the two mountains.

Stob Bàn's north eastern face is precipitous and craggy and drops steeply to the valley of the Allt na Lairige. All drainage from the mountain finds its way to Loch Treig to reach the sea via the River Spean and Loch Linnhe at the west coast. One unusual characteristic of Stob Bàn is the so-called "Giants Staircase", this is a 200-metre stretch of quartzite slabs encountered when descending from the 800 metre col between Stob Bàn and Stob Choire Claurigh to the Lairig Leacach, the staircase is awkward to negotiate especially in wet conditions.

The direct ascent of Stob Bàn is usually undertaken from Corrie Choille farm in Glen Spean at grid reference NN251807. Going south, following the old Drovers' road between Glen Spean and Loch Treig, going over the pass of the Lairig Leacach and dropping down to the Lairig Leacach bothy. From here strike up the hillside to reach the east ridge which leads to the summit. Stob Bàn is often climbed in conjunction with some or all of the Grey Corries Munros, this walk also starts from Corrie Choille farm. The view from the summit is very good with the Mamores and the hills around Loch Treig looking fine.
