= Meall Garbh (Lawers Group) =

Mountain in Perth and Kinross, Scotland

Coordinates: 56.56561°N 4.20829°W

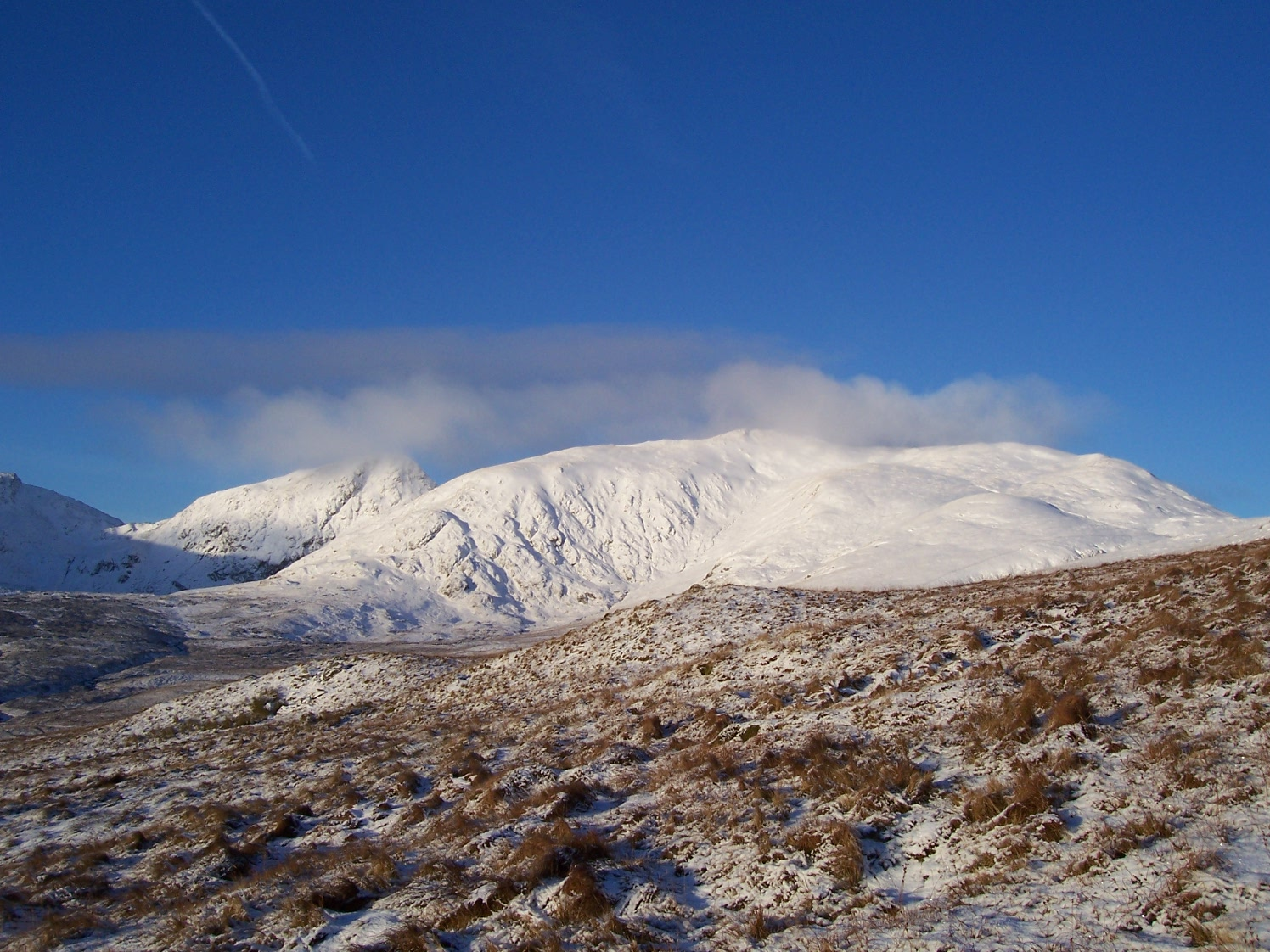
- An Stuc and Meall Garbh in winter

Highest point
- Elevation: 1,118 m (3,668 ft)
- Prominence: 198 m (650 ft)
- Listing: Munro, Marilyn

Naming
- English translation: rough hill
- Language of name: Gaelic
- Pronunciation: Scottish Gaelic: [ˈmjaul̪ˠ ˈkaɾav]

Geography
- Location: Perth and Kinross, Scotland
- OS grid: NN644437
- Topo map: OS Landranger 51

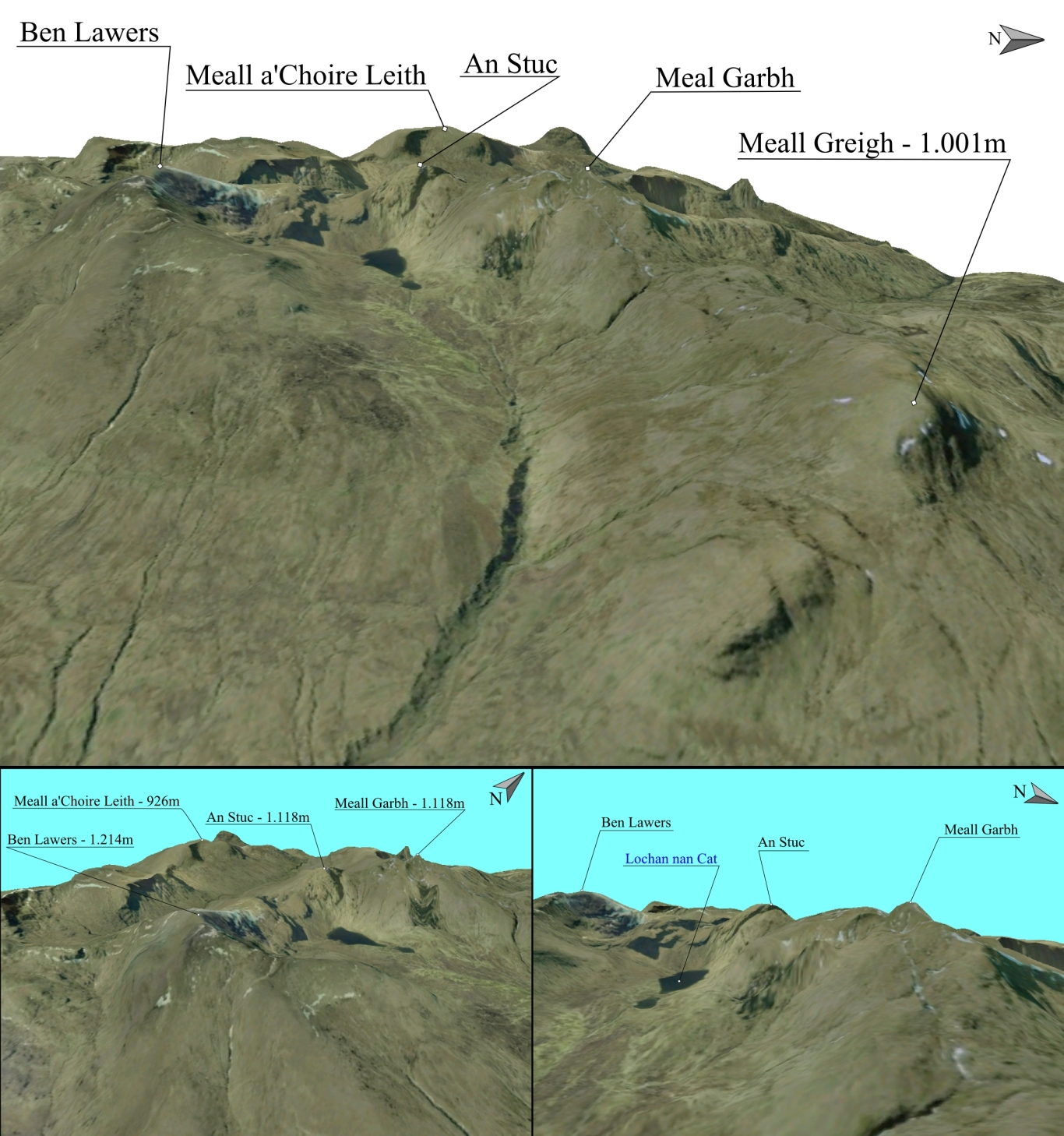
Meall Garbh 3D map

Meall Garbh is a mountain in the southern part of the Scottish Highlands. With Meall Greigh it forms the north-eastern end of the Ben Lawers range. Its craggy south face overlooks Lochan nan Cat.

The summit is not easily seen from the A827 road, from where the ascent is usually started. A path follows the Lawers Burn towards Lochan nan Cat. For a direct ascent of Meall Garbh the walker may simply climb Northeast from this path shortly after it passes some abandoned shielings. Alternatively, Meall Garbh is more commonly climbed in conjunction with Meall Greigh, with the latter hill being climbed first; the route described previously is thus used for descent. Meall Garbh could also form part of a longer traverse of the Ben Lawers Range, taking another four Munros, finishing at the National Trust for Scotland visitor centre. This route can be further extended to a total of seven Munros if one also climbs Meall a' Choire Léith and Meall Corranaich.

== See also ==
- Ben Nevis
- List of Munro mountains
- Mountains and hills of Scotland
