= Ben Lawers =

1214m high mountain in Scotland

- Beinn Labhair
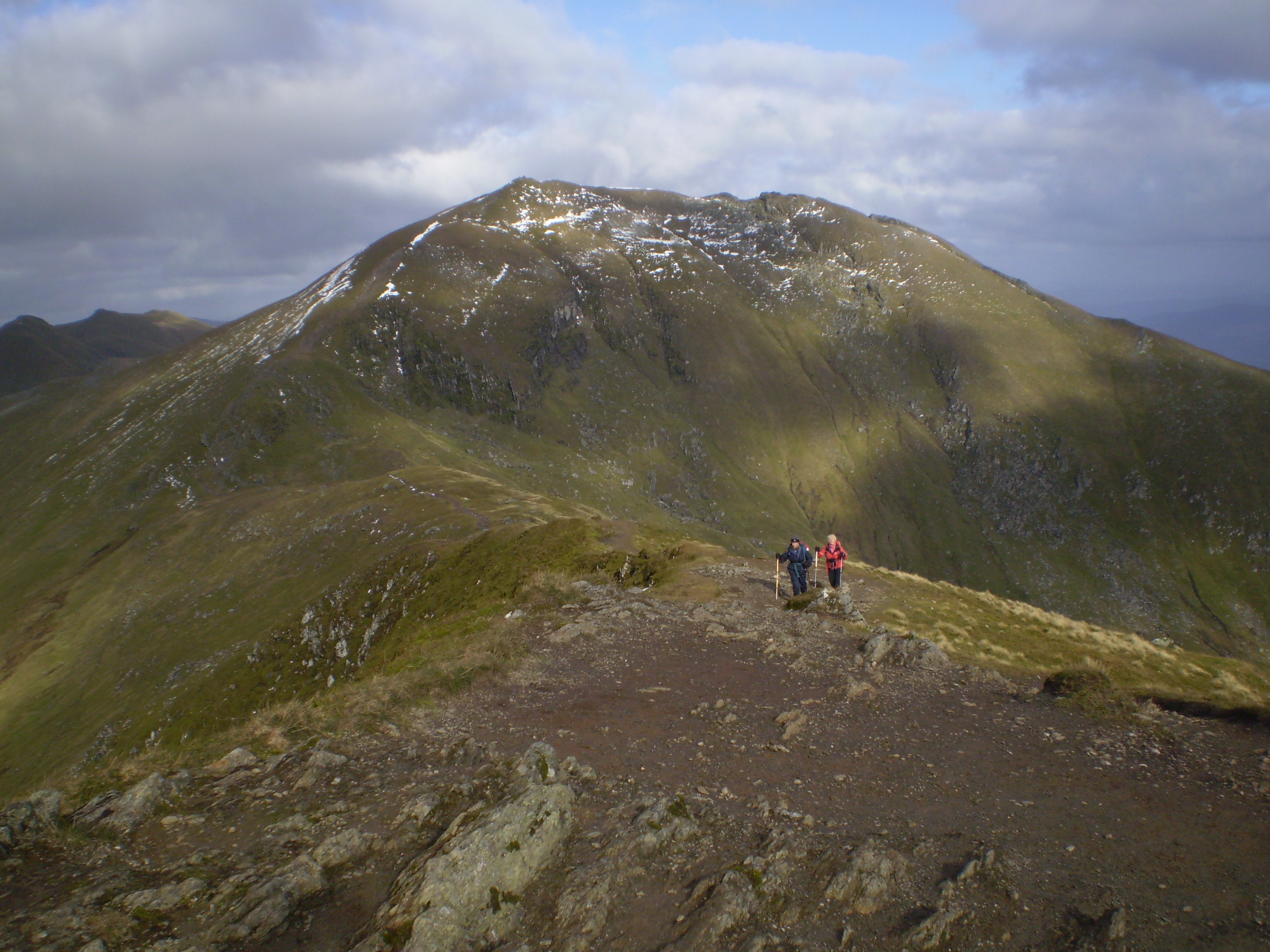
- Ben Lawers seen from Beinn Ghlas

Highest point
- Elevation: 1,214 m (3,983 ft)
- Prominence: c. 915 m Ranked 11th in British Isles
- Parent peak: Ben Nevis
- Listing: Munro, Marilyn, Council top (Perth and Kinross), County top (Perthshire)
- Coordinates: 56°32′44″N 4°13′15″W

Naming
- English translation: mountain of the loud stream
- Pronunciation: Scottish Gaelic: [peɲ ˈl̪ˠavɪɾʲ]

Geography
- Ben Lawers in Perth and Kinross Ben Lawers in Scotland
- Location: Perth and Kinross, Scotland
- Parent range: Grampian Mountains
- OS grid: NN636414
- Topo map: OS Landranger 51

Ben Lawers (Scottish Gaelic: Beinn Labhair) is the highest mountain in the Breadalbane region of the Scottish Highlands. It lies north of Loch Tay and is the highest peak of the 'Ben Lawers group', a ridge that includes six other Munros: Beinn Ghlas, Meall Garbh, Meall Corranaich, An Stùc, Meall Greigh and Meall a' Choire Leith. It is also the highest peak in Perthshire, and the tenth highest Munro in Scotland. Ben Lawers was long thought to be over 4,000 feet (1,219 metres) in height, but accurate measurement in the 1870s showed it to be only 3,983 feet (1,214 m). (the figure of 3,983 ft is a conversion from metric - the surveyed height from the main triangulation has always been 3,984 ft on imperial maps published since the 1870s.

Ben Lawers is formed of metamorphic rock, most notably calcareous mica-schists, and lower down, schistose grits. Although only the 11th highest Munro, it is the second highest non-igneous peak after Aonach Beag, which owes its exceptional height to proximity to Ben Nevis (the other high igneous group being the Cairngorms). Ben Lawers stands out by around 100-200 metres from neighbouring massifs as an isolated landmark 30 km east of the main Highlands watershed along or near which comparably high peaks are ranged. This associates with its proximity to the major Caledonide Loch Tay Fault along which kilometric displacements have occurred; adjacent to this fault are other landmark peaks at Ben Vorlich and Beinn a'Ghlo. The summit of Ben Lawers is affected by a pair of conspicuous Rock Slope Failures, providing shelter in their landslipped recesses, havens for wildlife, and large debris masses in the south corrie which if reinstated could restore a pre-historic summit in excess of 4,000 ft.

Ben Lawers lies on the local watershed between the rivers Tay and Lyon. Since the 1950s, water has been captured from the numerous burns on the south face of Ben Lawers and Meall nan Tarmachan as part of the Breadalbane Hydro-Electric Scheme. The water is diverted to the Lochan na Lairige, from where it is piped to drive hydro-electric turbines at Finlarig on the banks of Loch Tay. The level of the Lochan na Lairige was raised by the construction of the 344-metre-long Lawers Dam, a buttress-type dam that is 42 m high.

Due to its high elevation and underlying geology, Ben Lawers is home to an exceptionally rich selection of arctic-alpine plant species and habitats. Since 1964, it has been designated as a National Nature Reserve (NNR).

== History ==
There is much evidence of former settlements and other human activity on the southern slopes of Ben Lawers above Loch Tay. The fertile limestone and schist soils on these southern slopes have been farmed since very early times and there are many Bronze Age remains. The discovery of many boulders with cup and ring marks led Derek Alexander, an archaeologist for the National Trust for Scotland, to note that the Ben Lawers was likely to have been "a very significant landscape in prehistory".

Overgrown tracks climb up the mountain from the valley to the peat beds and sheilings on the hillside, and there are ruins of cottages each surrounded by a small group of trees. These, along with the remains of ridged pastures, are signs of early cultivation. This evidence of habitation, and the presence of huts associated with transhumance at high elevation, demonstrate that local people are likely to have visited most if not all of the summits of the Ben Lawers range whilst grazing animals at height during the summer. The mapmaker Timothy Pont visited the area 1590s, and writer Ian R. Mitchell considers that Pont's surveys show that he, or one of his associates, is likely to have climbed Ben Lawers, and should therefore be credited with earliest recorded ascent. Otherwise, the earliest recorded ascent was by members of a party organised by military surveyor William Roy: although it is not certain that Roy himself climbed the peak, his writings show that measurements were taken from the summit of Ben Lawers on 17 September 1776.

In 1878, a group of twenty men led by Malcolm Ferguson spent a day building a 6-metre-high (20 ft) cairn nearly 15 metres (50 ft) in diameter in the hope of bringing the summit above the "magic" figure of 4,000 feet (1,219.2 m). The cairn, which was topped with a massive block of white quartz is no longer there; in any case the Ordnance Survey ignored it as an artificial structure that was not truly part of the hill.

== Ownership ==
Prior to the 14th century, the mountain stood on the lands of Clan MacMillan. Chalmers of Lawers obtained the land by force from the clan in the mid-14th century in the reign of David II. The land was confiscated from the Chalmers family in 1473 by James III and given to Sir Colin Campbell of Glenorchy after Thomas Chalmers was implicated in the murder of James I. The lands have mainly remained in the ownership of the Campbells of Glenorchy and Breadalbane up to the present day, with some notable exceptions. Many of the farms were sold off in the late 1940s.

Most of the south side of the Ben Lawers range has since 1950 been owned by the National Trust for Scotland, and was purchased through the generosity of Percy Unna, a mountaineer and one time president of the Scottish Mountaineering Club. The area of land under trust ownership was extended in 1996 by the purchase of the neighbouring Tarmachan range. The trust built a visitor centre at the western end of the range that had an exhibition explaining the geological formation of the mountain, but this was closed and demolished in 2010. A new car park has been built on the opposite side of the road, from where a path leads to the summit of Ben Lawers by way of the intermediate peak of Beinn Ghlas. There is a nature trail on the lower section of this path, with information leaflets available in the car park.

The northern side of the Ben Lawers range comprises three privately owned estates, at Roroyere, Roromore, and South Chesthill. All three cover land extending from Glen Lyon to the watershed of the ridge. As with all land in Scotland, there is a freedom to roam on the hills regardless of whether the land is in public or private ownership, provided that access is exercised responsibly, in accordance with the Scottish Outdoor Access Code.

== Nature and conservation ==
Ben Lawers National Nature Reserve
- IUCN category II (national park)
- Location within Perth and Kinross
- Location: Perth and Kinross, Scotland
- Coordinates: 56°32′44″N 4°13′15″W
- Area: 44.4 km^{2} (17.1 sq mi)
- Designation: NatureScot
- Established: 1964
- Owner: National Trust for Scotland
- Website: Ben Lawers National Nature Reserve

Ben Lawers is regarded by botanists as one of the richest areas for alpine flora in the UK, due to the schist rocks of the mountain which are situated at the correct elevation for the plants. The rocks supply an adequate amount of calcium, magnesium, sodium, potassium and iron to the plants and breaks down to a clayish soil which retains moisture. Some of the plants found on Lawers include alpine forget-me-not, roseroot, net-leaved willow and most of the saxifrages. The Sunday Times reported on 15 February 2021 that efforts are being made on Lawers to save the rare flower Sabulina rubella, also known as Mountain Sandwort, from extinction.

The mountain is also of interest to zoologists. Some of the bird species include ravens, ring ouzels, red grouse, ptarmigan, golden eagle, peregrine falcon, dotterel, golden plover, and short-eared owls. Other rare species include the viviparous lizard and the wildcat.

Ben Lawers is internationally significant for its lichen flora, with over 430 species recorded from its high ground. The mountain's combination of calcareous mica-schist geology, severe climate, and extensive summit cliffs creates ideal conditions for arctic–alpine lichens, particularly in the summit cliffs and Lochan nan Cat corrie areas. The site has yielded several species previously unknown in the British Isles and is considered one of the most important locations for alpine lichens in Britain.

The Ben Lawers range has been designated as a National Nature Reserve (NNR) since 1964. In 2005 the boundary was altered so that all NTS land at Ben Lawers (including the neighbouring Tarmachan range) was included in the NNR, which the trust now manages on behalf of NatureScot. Ben Lawers is also designated as a Special Area of Conservation (SAC), and a Site of Special Scientific Interest (SSSI). The Ben Lawers National Nature Reserve is classified as a Category II protected area by the International Union for Conservation of Nature.

The Ben Lawers range forms part of the Loch Rannoch and Glen Lyon National Scenic Area, one of forty such areas in Scotland, which are defined so as to identify areas of exceptional scenery and to ensure its protection from inappropriate development by restricting certain forms of development.

== Climbing ==
Ben Lawers is a popular mountain, resulting in path erosion and vegetation loss from the number of visiting hillwalkers. Since the 1980s NTS, in partnership with other groups, have undertaken work on the path network in an attempt to control the impact of the high visitor numbers. The simplest route of ascent starts from the NTS carpark, following a path that reaches the summit via an intermediate peak, Beinn Ghlas. Alternative routes that avoid the erosion caused by the popularity of the main route usually start by following Lawers Burn, which meet the A827 at the village of Lawers. Heading north from this burn allows the walker to climb the peaks to the northeast of Ben Lawers on the way. The most direct route to the summit of Ben Lawers from Lawers is to continue along the Lawers Burn as far as the Lochan nan Cat ("lochan of the cats"), before heading straight to the summit by way of the east ridge.

== Gallery of images ==
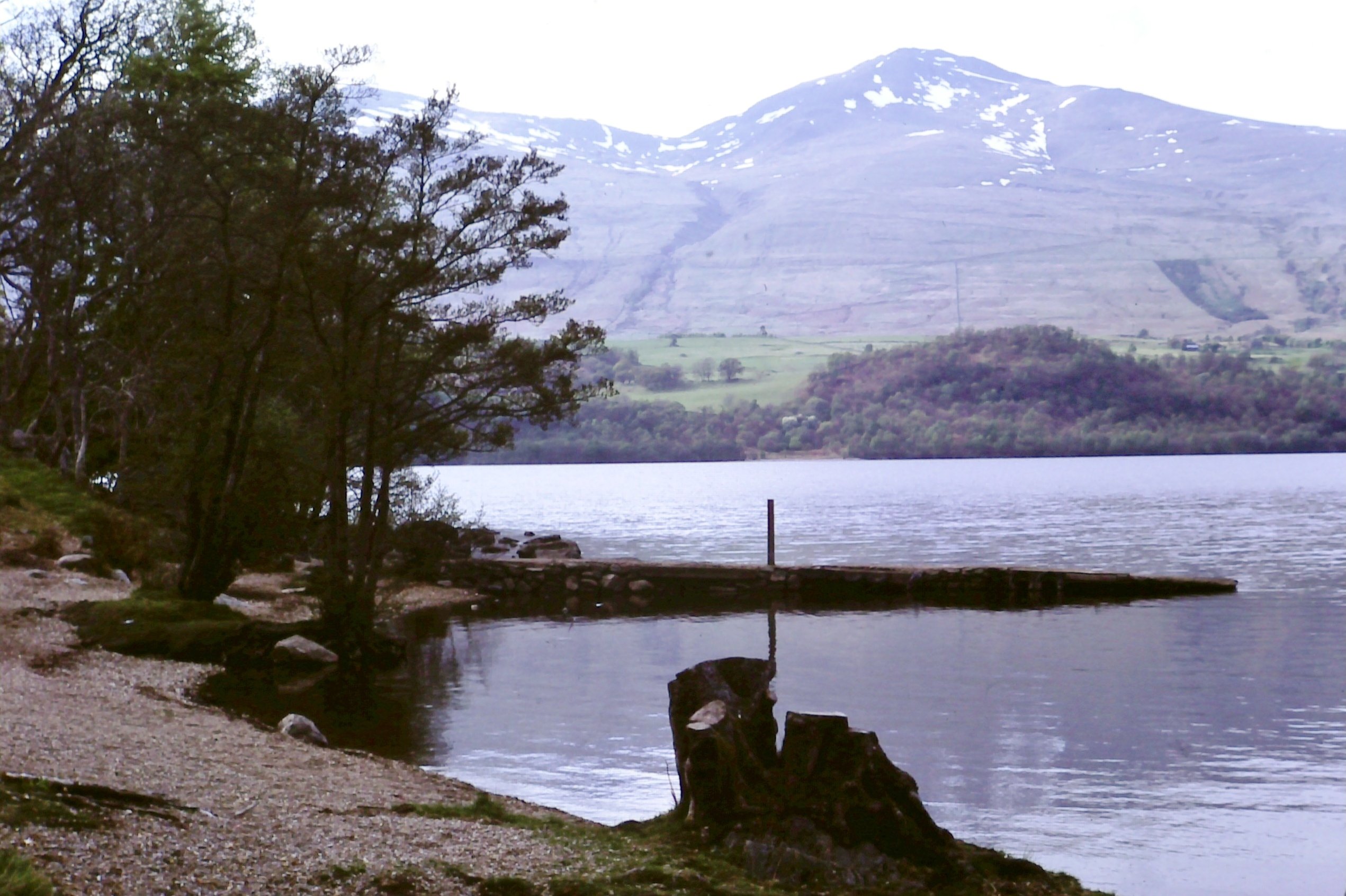
Ben Lawers seen from Loch Tay

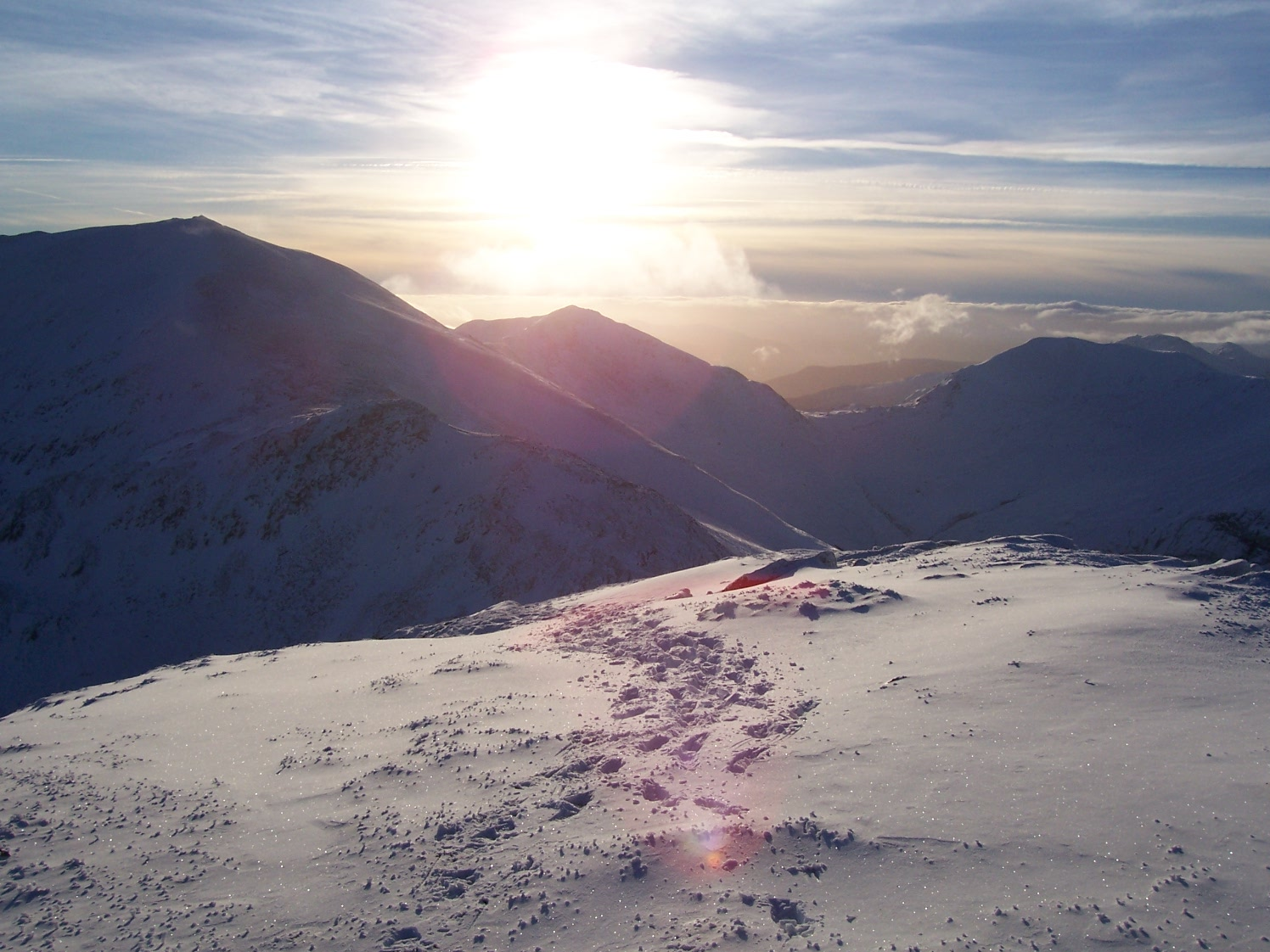
Ben Lawers in winter

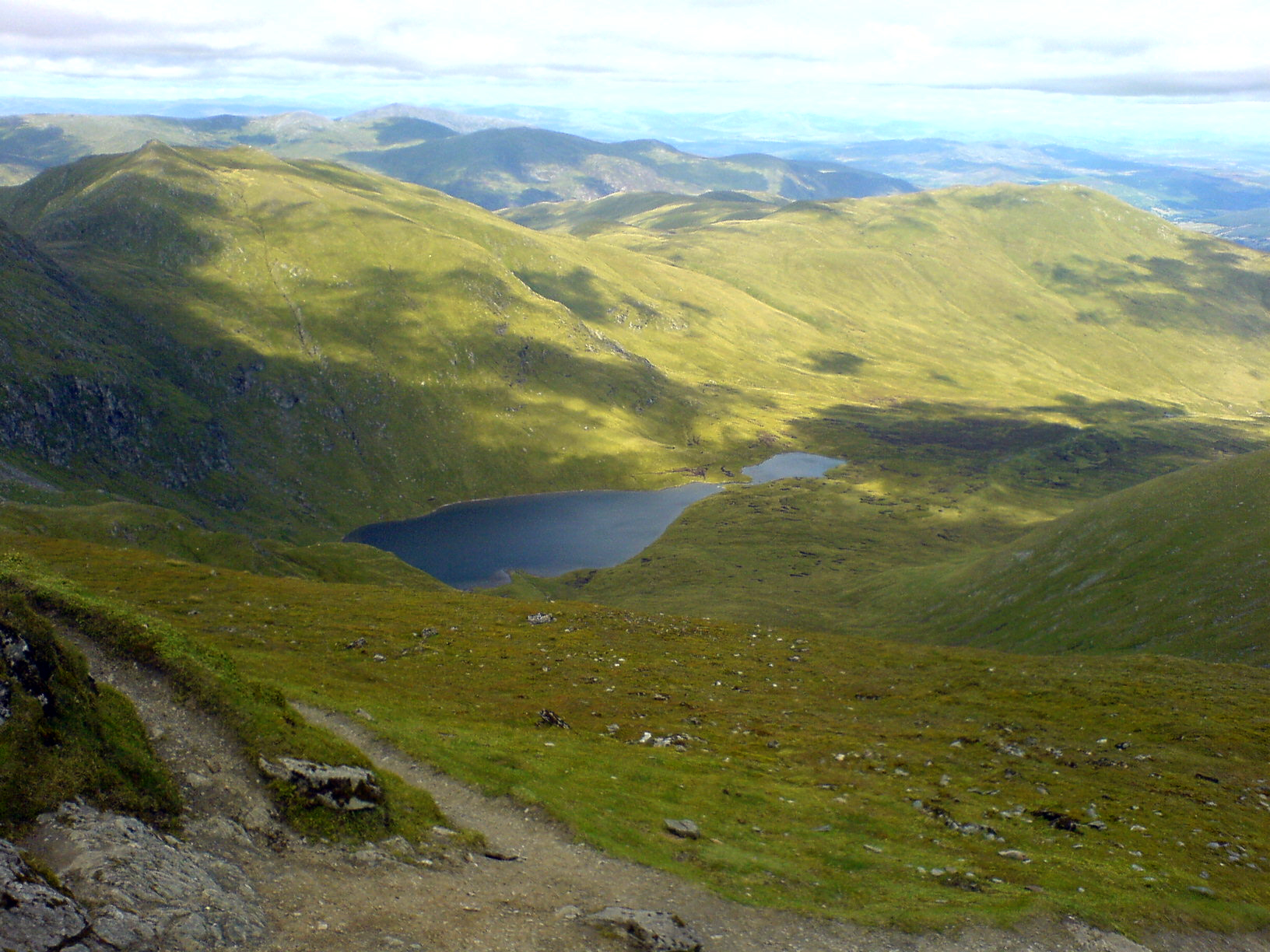
Lochan Nan Cat from the summit of Ben Lawers

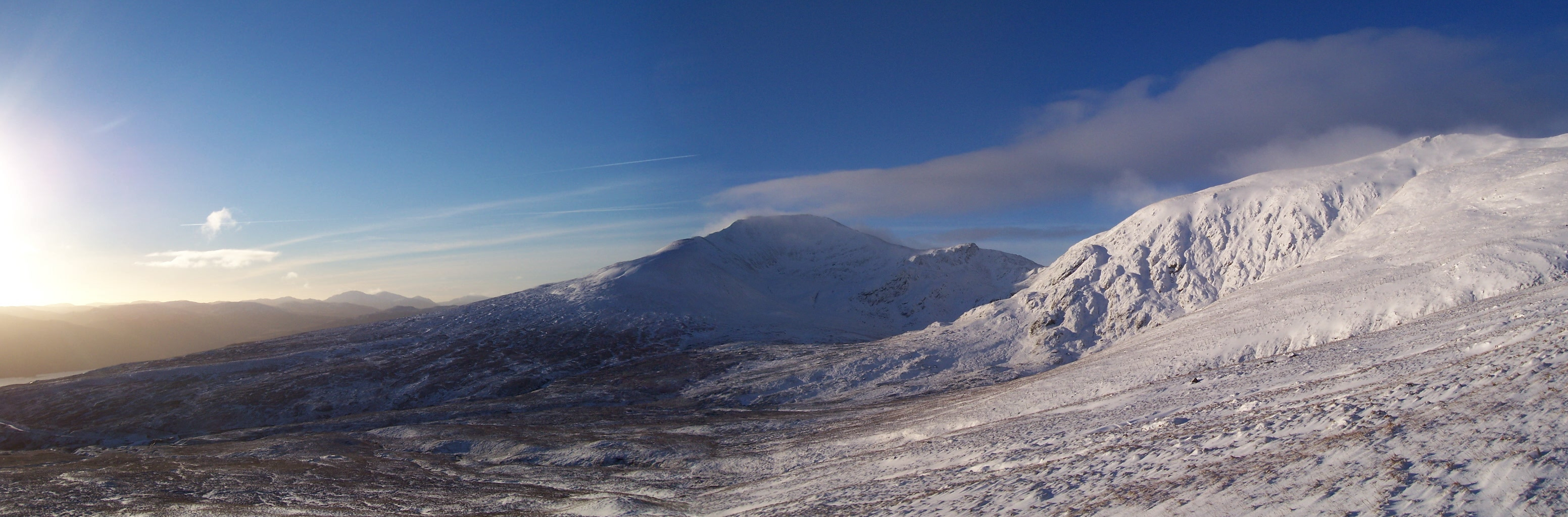
Ben Lawers and Meall Garbh

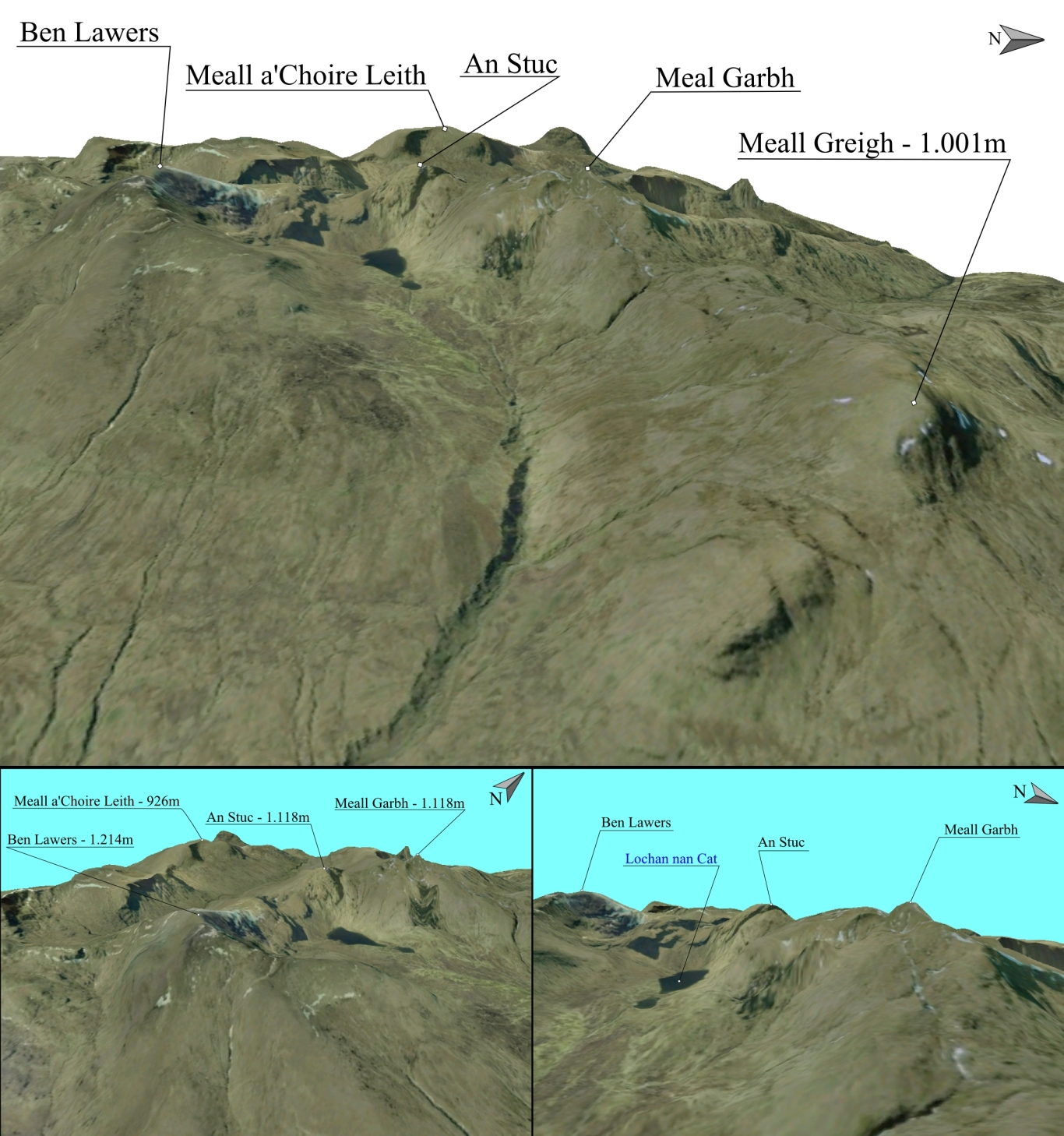
Ben Lawers 3D map

Ben Lawers summit

== See also ==
- Ben Nevis
- List of Munro mountains
- List of places in Perth and Kinross
- Mountains and hills of Scotland
