= Beinn Ghlas =

Mountain in the Southern Highlands of Scotland

Coordinates: 56.53543°N 4.23743°W

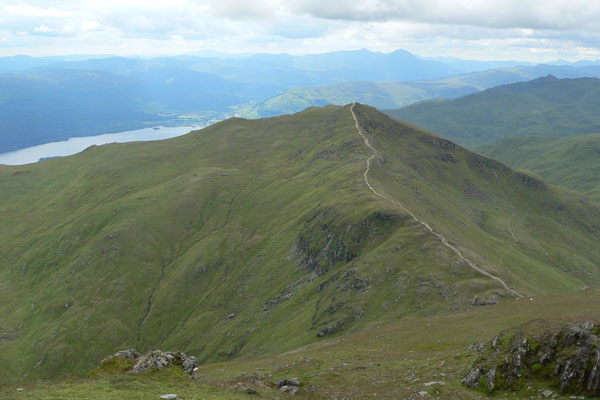
- Beinn Ghlas from the western slopes of Ben Lawers

Highest point
- Elevation: 1,103 m (3,619 ft)
- Prominence: c. 105 m
- Listing: Munro

Naming
- English translation: grey-green mountain
- Language of name: Gaelic
- Pronunciation: Scottish Gaelic: [peɲ ˈɣl̪ˠas̪]

Geography
- Location: Perth and Kinross, Scotland
- Parent range: Grampian Mountains
- OS grid: NN625404
- Topo map: OS Landranger 51

Beinn Ghlas is a mountain in the Breadalbane region of the Scottish Highlands. It lies on the north shore of Loch Tay and is part of the Ben Lawers Range. It is a Munro with a height of 1,103 metres (3,619 ft).

The Gaelic name is translated as 'grey-green mountain', which refers to the colour of the mica-schist that makes up the bulk of the mountain and that falls as a scree on its south-western side. The path up the mountain leads past outcrops of this rock that also reveal large garnets.

The usual route to the summit leaves from the car park, follows Edramucky Burn, and climbs to the south-western ridge of the mountain. The deep corrie of Coire Odhar (the dun-coloured corrie) lies to the north. Walkers who continue on to Ben Lawers can avoid the 100-metre re-ascent of Beinn Ghlas on their return by taking the path that runs west of the summit, down to Coire Odhar.
