= Meall Corranaich =

Mountain in Perth and Kinross, Scotland

- Meall Choire Inich
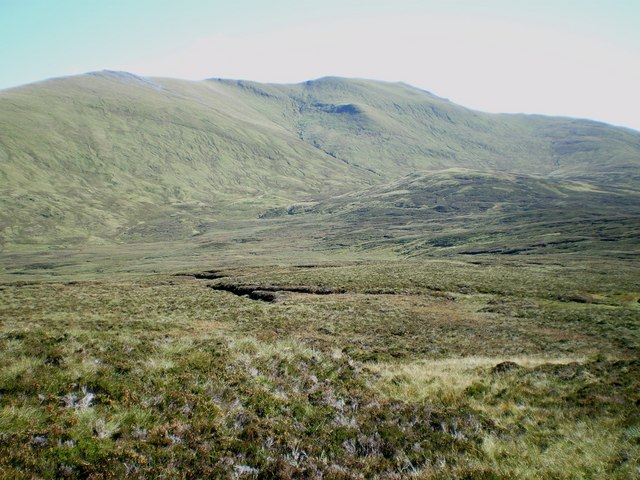
- Meall Corranaich

Highest point
- Elevation: 1,069 m (3,507 ft)
- Prominence: 202 m (663 ft)
- Listing: Munro, Marilyn
- Coordinates: 56°32′27″N 4°15′12″W

Geography
- Location: Perthshire, Scotland
- Parent range: Grampian Mountains
- OS grid: NN615410
- Topo map: OS Landranger 51

Meall Corranaich (Scottish Gaelic: Meall Choire Inich) is a mountain with a height of 1,069 metres (3,507 ft) in the Grampian Mountains of Scotland. It lies on the northern shore of Loch Tay in Perthshire, and is part of the Ben Lawers group.

It is usually climbed from the northwest starting at Glen Lyon. The town of Aberfeldy lies to the east.
