= Stob Coire an Laoigh =

Mountain in Scotland

Coordinates: 56°48′40″N 4°53′2″W

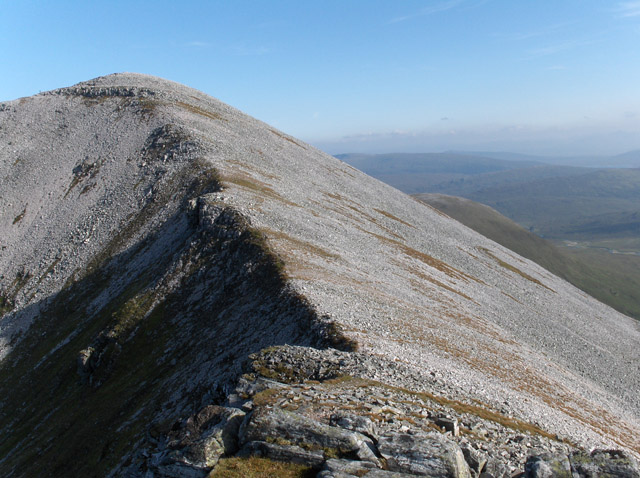

Highest point
- Elevation: 1,116 m (3,661 ft)
- Prominence: 74 m (243 ft)
- Parent peak: Stob Choire Claurigh
- Listing: Munro

Naming
- English translation: Peak of the corrie of the calf
- Language of name: Gaelic

Geography
- Location: The Grey Corries, Scotland
- OS grid: NN240725
- Topo map: OS Landranger 41

Climbing
- Easiest route: Hike

Stob Coire an Laoigh (Scottish Gaelic: Peak of the corrie of the calf) is a Scottish mountain in The Grey Corries Range, 15 kilometres north east of Kinlochleven.

At an elevation of 1,116 metres (3,661 ft) Stob Coire an Laoigh is equal 37th in height (with Aonach Beag near Ben Alder) on the Munro table.

== See also ==
- Ben Nevis
- List of Munro mountains
- Mountains and hills of Scotland
