= An Socach (Glen Cannich) =

Mountain in Highland, Scotland

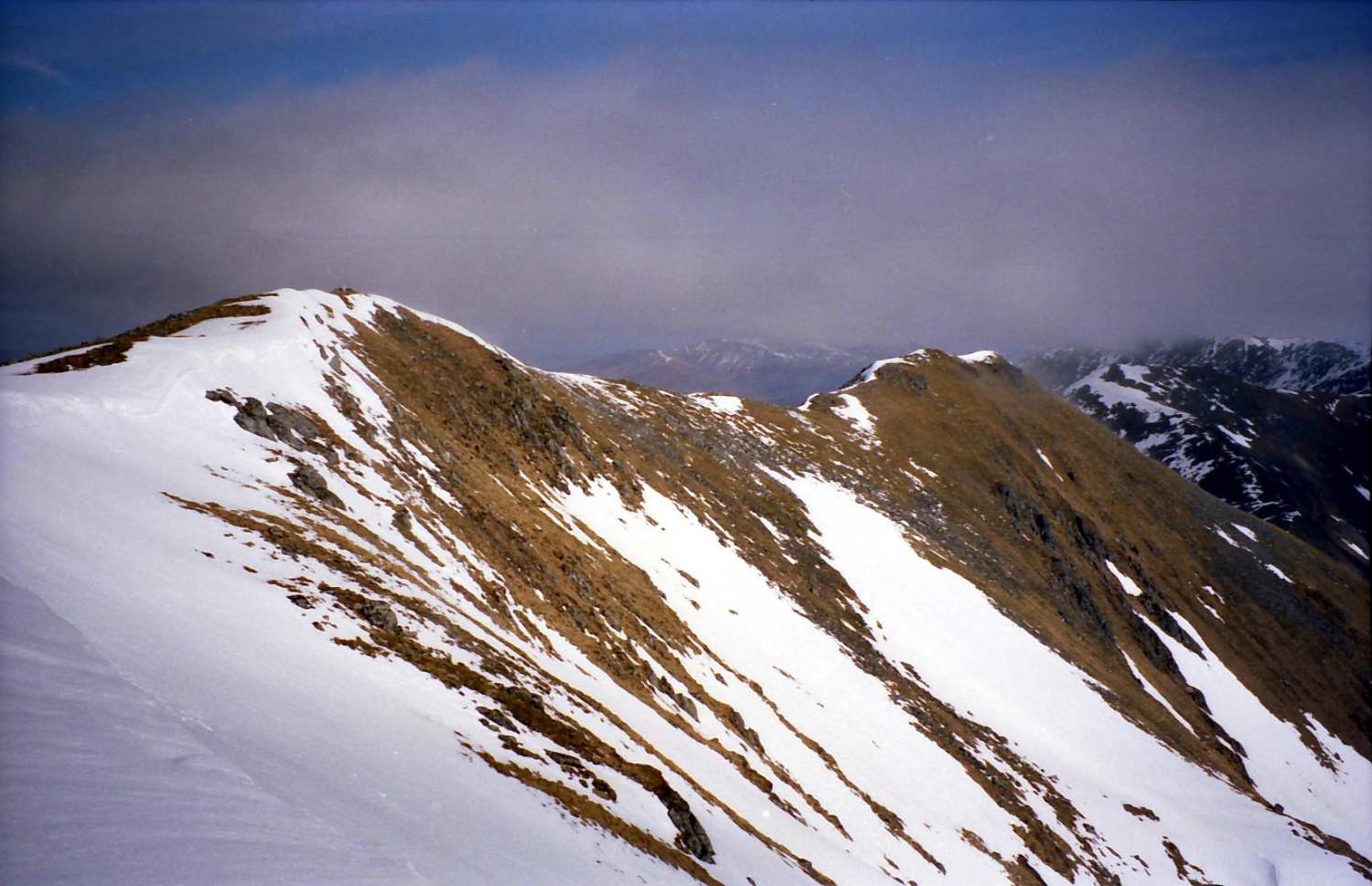
- Summit ridge of An Socach

Highest point
- Elevation: 1,069 m (3,507 ft)
- Prominence: 204 m (669 ft)
- Listing: Munro, Marilyn
- Coordinates: 57°21′00″N 5°09′32″W

Naming
- Language of name: Gaelic

Geography
- Location within Highland
- Location: Highland, Scotland
- OS grid: NH100332
- Topo map: OS Landranger 25, OS Explorer 429, 430

An Socach is a mountain at the head of Glen Cannich, in the Highlands of Scotland. It is situated between Loch Mullardoch in Glen Cannich, and Loch Monar in Glen Strathfarrar.
