= Sgairneach Mhòr =

Mountain in Perth and Kinross, Scotland

Coordinates: 56.8279°N 4.2981°W

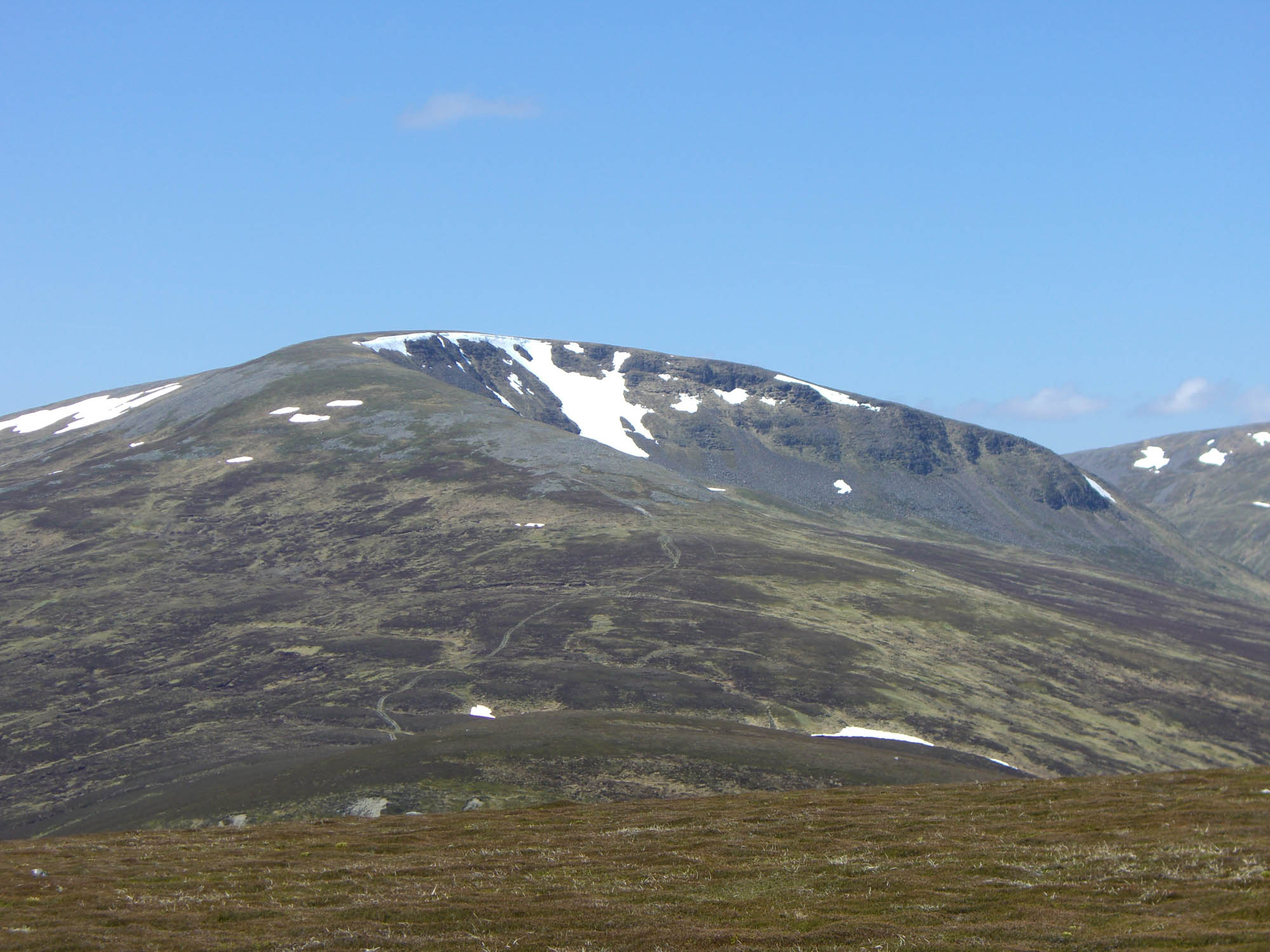
- Sgairneach Mhòr seen from The Sow of Atholl, 3 km to the east.

Highest point
- Elevation: 991 m (3,251 ft)
- Prominence: 182 m (597 ft)
- Listing: Munro, Marilyn

Naming
- English translation: Big Rocky Hillside
- Language of name: Gaelic
- Pronunciation: Scottish Gaelic: [ˈs̪kaːrˠɲəx ˈvoːɾ]

Geography
- Location: Perth and Kinross, Scotland
- Parent range: Grampian Mountains
- OS grid: NN598731
- Topo map: OS Landranger 42, OS Explorer 394

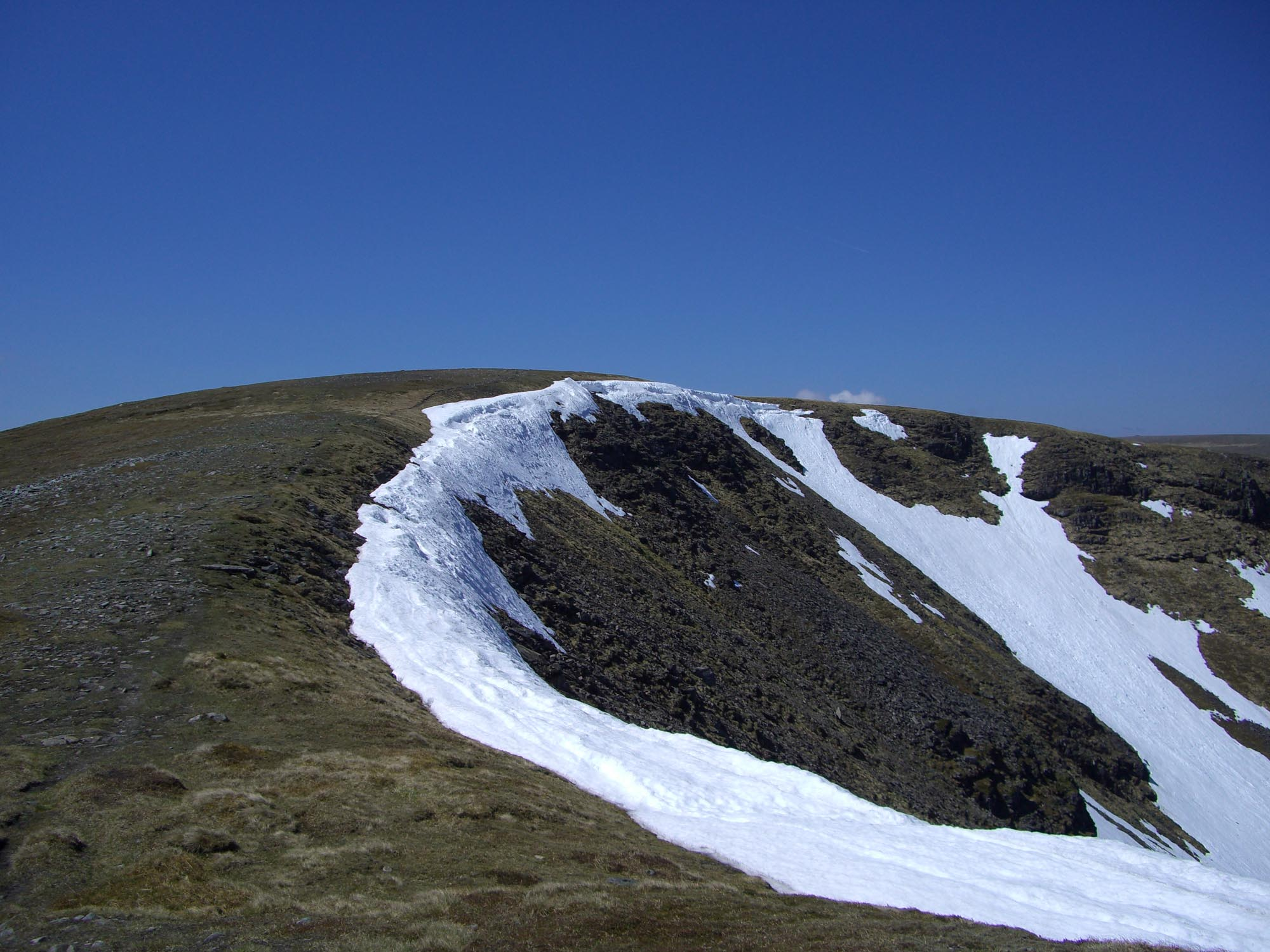
Approaching the summit up the east ridge gives an opportunity to examine Coire Creagach.

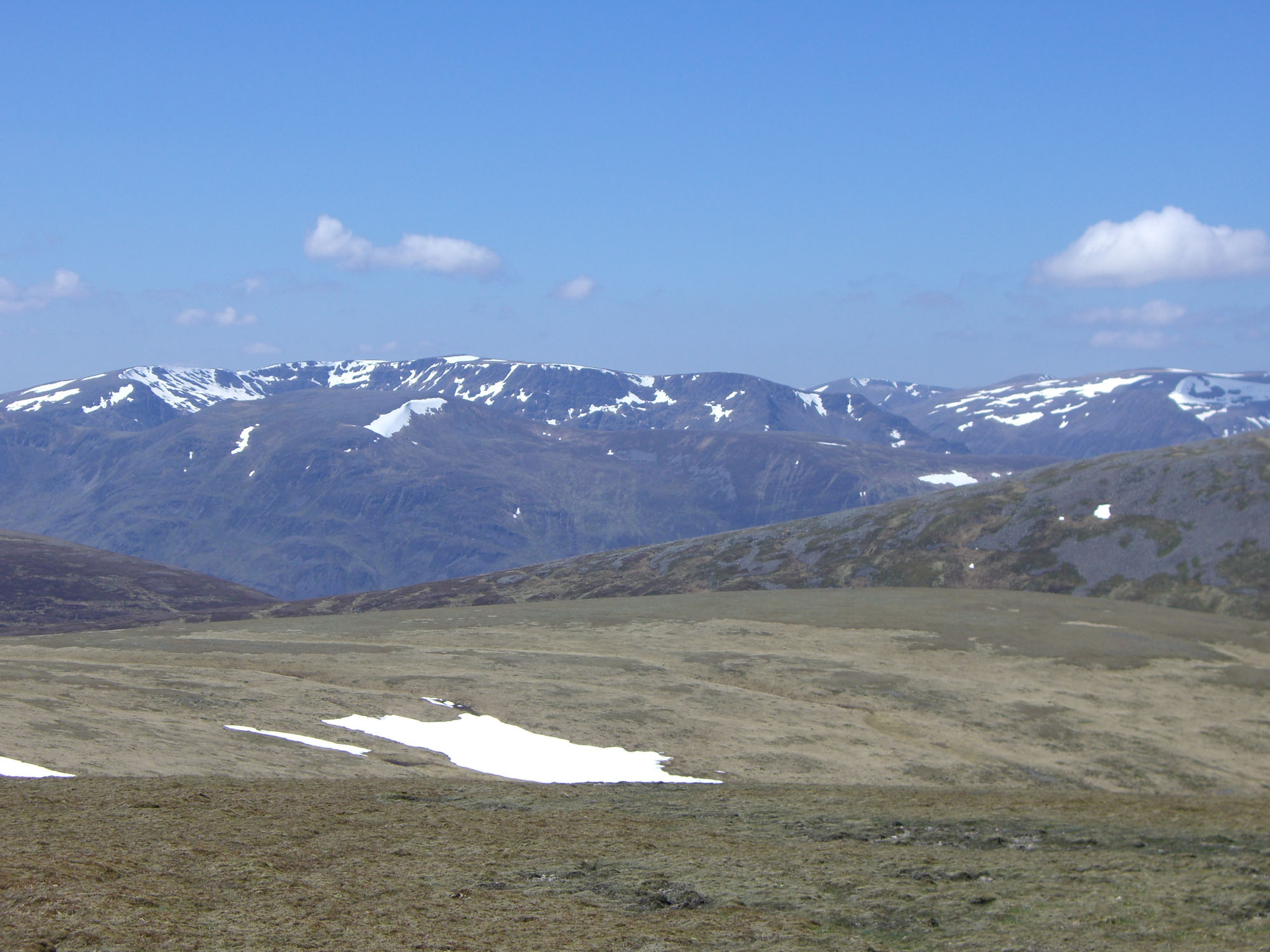
The view west from the summit to the Ben Alder mountains.

Sgairneach Mhòr is a Scottish mountain which lies in a group of seven Munros near the summit of the Pass of Drumochter and are known as the Drumochter mountains or informerly as the “A9 Munros”. The mountain is situated 13 km SSW of Dalwhinnie and four km east of the large Loch Ericht.

== Overview ==
Sgairneach Mhòr lies to the west of the A9 road in area of high ground which was historically called the Druim Uachdair (the ridge of the upper ground). It is a Munro and a Marilyn with a height of 991 metres (3251 feet). The hill is well seen from the Pass of Drumochter showing off its impressive north facing corrie Coire Creagach which holds snow well into the spring. This notable rocky corrie gives the mountain its name which translates from the Gaelic as “Big Rocky Hillside” and this underlines the fact that Sgairneach Mhòr is the only hill in the group with any significant stony areas on its surface and makes it the most visually striking of the Drumochter hills.

== Geography ==
Sgairneach Mhòr has extensive southern slopes which include the subsidiary tops of Màm Bàn (919 metres) and Meallan Buidhe (879 metres) and descend to the glen of the Allt Shallainn which is the main tributary of Loch Garry. Two distinct ridges go north and east from the summit enclosing Coire Creagach which is rocky but not overly steep giving a sporting scramble to the summit. The summit of the mountain is a SW-NE orientated plateau with the highest point never in doubt, standing at the NE end close to the edge of Coire Creagach and being marked by an OS trig point surrounded by a low stone built wind shelter. The summit of the mountain was given as 500 metres SW of the present position in the original 1891 version of Munro's Tables, due to the limitations of the available mapping. This position (marked by a cairn) measures only 963 metres in altitude, almost 30 metres lower than the true summit. The correct position was noted in the 1921 edition of the Tables. However the 1974 edition, the first to give grid references, gives the old position, doubtless an oversight.

The eastern ridge connects to the adjacent Corbett of The Sow of Atholl, and is narrow near the summit as it goes round the rim of Coire Creagach before broadening as it drops in easy angled slopes to a col with a height of approximately 650 metres. This eastern ridge is one of the main routes of ascent. The NE ridge is another possible route of ascent from upper Coire Dhomhain although its slopes are steep and rough in places. The hills western flank consist of broad slopes which contour around the head of Coire Dhomhain and descend to a col which links to the adjacent Munro of Beinn Udlamain. All drainage from the mountain goes south via the rivers Garry and Tummel to join the drainage basin of the River Tay and reaching the east coast at the Firth of Tay.

== Ascents and view ==
The direct ascent of Sgairneach Mhòr is not a difficult walk as the starting point is at the summit of the Drumochter Pass on the A9 road and has a starting altitude of 462 metres. The walk crosses the railway and ascends Coire Dhomhain on a good track on the north bank of the Allt Coire Dhomhain. After approximately two km the track is left and the burn is crossed (no bridge) to its southern bank. It is then a walk south through pathless heather to reach the eastern ridge which is followed to the summit. If the burn is in spate then an alternative is to walk higher up into Coire Dhomhain and then ascend by the steeper northern ridge.

The ascent of Sgairneach Mhòr can be combined with any of the other three hills which stand around the glen of the Allt Coire Dhomhain. The SMCs Munro handbook recommends climbing it with Beinn Udlamain, however the high starting altitude at Drumochter Pass means a complete traverse around the valley including the hills of The Sow of Atholl, Sgairneach Mhòr, Beinn Udlamain and A' Mharconaich is not an over strenuous day. The highlight of the view from the summit is to the west where there is an excellent view of the Ben Alder group of mountains.
