= Beinn Udlamain =

Scottish mountain

Coordinates: 56.8355°N 4.33°W

- Beinn Ùdlamain (Scottish Gaelic)
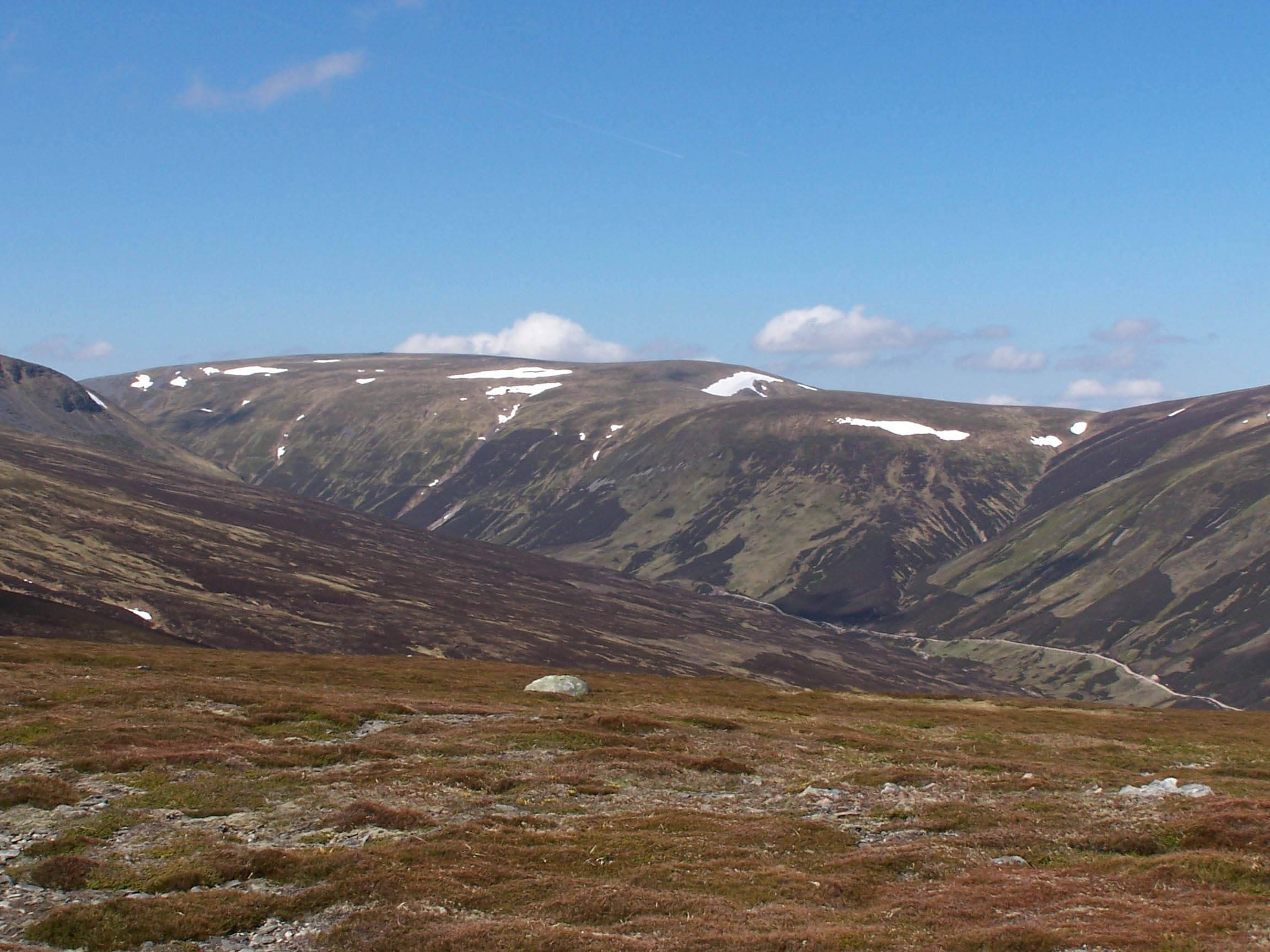
- Beinn Udlamain from the east, the track up Coire Dhomhain is clearly in view.

Highest point
- Elevation: 1,011 m (3,317 ft)
- Prominence: 556 m (1,824 ft)
- Listing: Munro, Marilyn

Naming
- English translation: Gloomy Mountain
- Language of name: Gaelic
- Pronunciation: Scottish Gaelic: [peɲ ˈuːt̪l̪ˠamɛɲ]

Geography
- Location: Perth and Kinross / Highland, Scotland
- Parent range: Grampian Mountains
- OS grid: NN579739
- Topo map: OS Landranger 42, OS Explorer 394

Beinn Udlamain is a Scottish mountain which stands just to the west of the summit of the Pass of Drumochter and east of Loch Ericht, some 30 km west-northwest of the village of Blair Atholl. The mountain’s summit stands on the border between the Highland and Perth and Kinross council areas.

== Overview ==
At 1011 metres (3317 feet) Beinn Udlamain qualifies as a Munro, and with a high prominence, a Marilyn. It is the highest of the Drumochter hills, however it is not the most eye catching of the group, being flat topped and shielded from a clear view from the A9 road by the surrounding Munros of Sgairneach Mhòr and A' Mharconaich. The best view of the mountain can be obtained from the other hills around Coire Dhomhain. The most common interpretation of the mountain’s name from the Gaelic language is "Gloomy Mountain" which comes from the word Ùdlaidh which means gloomy but can also mean secluded. Other explanations of the name put forward by mountain writers are "hill of the unsteady place" and "hill of the shaking".

== Geography ==
Beinn Udlamain has a long north-south orientated summit ridge which stays above the 970 metre contour for over 1.5 kilometres. This ridge continues to the south to a col with a height of 809 metres which links to the adjacent Munro of Sgairneach Mhòr. In the opposite direction this ridge swings NE to link to A' Mharconaich which lies three km distant. Beinn Udlamain’s slopes consist mostly of grass and heather with very little rock but they do drop steeply to the west towards Loch Ericht and to the east to the valley of the Allt Coire Dhomhain. On the northern side of the mountain are two grassy corries, the Glas-choire and the Fraoch-choire, which both drain NW into Loch Ericht. The mountain is crossed by an ancient line of iron fence posts which mark the old boundary between Perthshire and Inverness-shire, this can be an aid to navigation in poor visibility.

The rolling topography of Beinn Udlamain and its adjoining peaks make it ideal ski touring country. The ski circuit of A' Mharconaich, Beinn Udlamain and Sgairneach Mhor is a classic route made popular by the close accessibility of the A9 road and the fact that the hills hold snow very well. Drainage from Beinn Udlamain goes to the east coast of Scotland either via Loch Ericht or the Allt Coire Dhomhain, both routes eventually join the River Tay.

== Ascents and view ==
Beinn Udlamain is invariably ascended from the A9 road from near the summit of the Drumochter Pass at grid reference NN632755, which gives a starting altitude of 462 metres. From here the direct ascent goes up Coire Dhomhain to its head where the south ridge of the mountain can be followed to the summit. A complete round of all the peaks around Coire Dhomhain can be done from this starting point, including the two already mentioned Munros and the Corbett The Sow of Atholl. The summit of the mountain is marked by a large cairn and wind shelter. The highlight of the view from the summit is to the SW where there is a fine view of a long stretch of Loch Ericht with the Ben Alder massif behind.
