= A' Mharconaich =

973m high mountain in the Scottish Highlands

- A' Mharcanaich
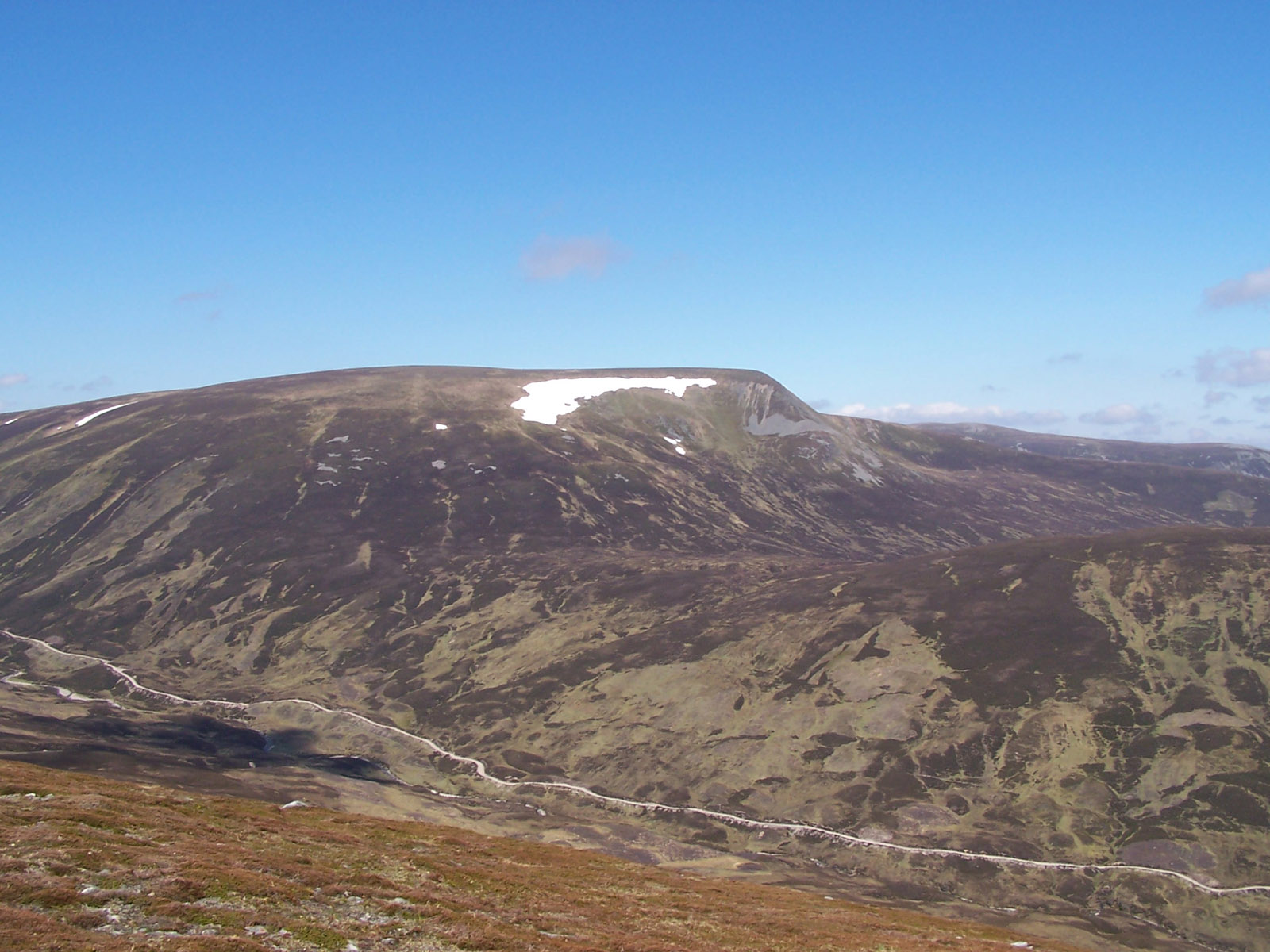
- A' Mharconaich from the south, the track up Coire Dhomhain is clearly in view.

Highest point
- Elevation: 975 m (3,199 ft)
- Prominence: 114 m (374 ft)
- Listing: Munro
- Coordinates: 56°51′26″N 4°17′22″W

Naming
- English translation: the horse place
- Language of name: Gaelic
- Pronunciation: Scottish Gaelic: [ə ˈvaɾkʰɔnɪç]

Geography
- Location within Highland
- Location: Badenoch and Strathspey Highland, Scotland
- Parent range: Grampian Mountains
- OS grid: NN604763
- Topo map: OS Landranger 42, OS Explorer 394

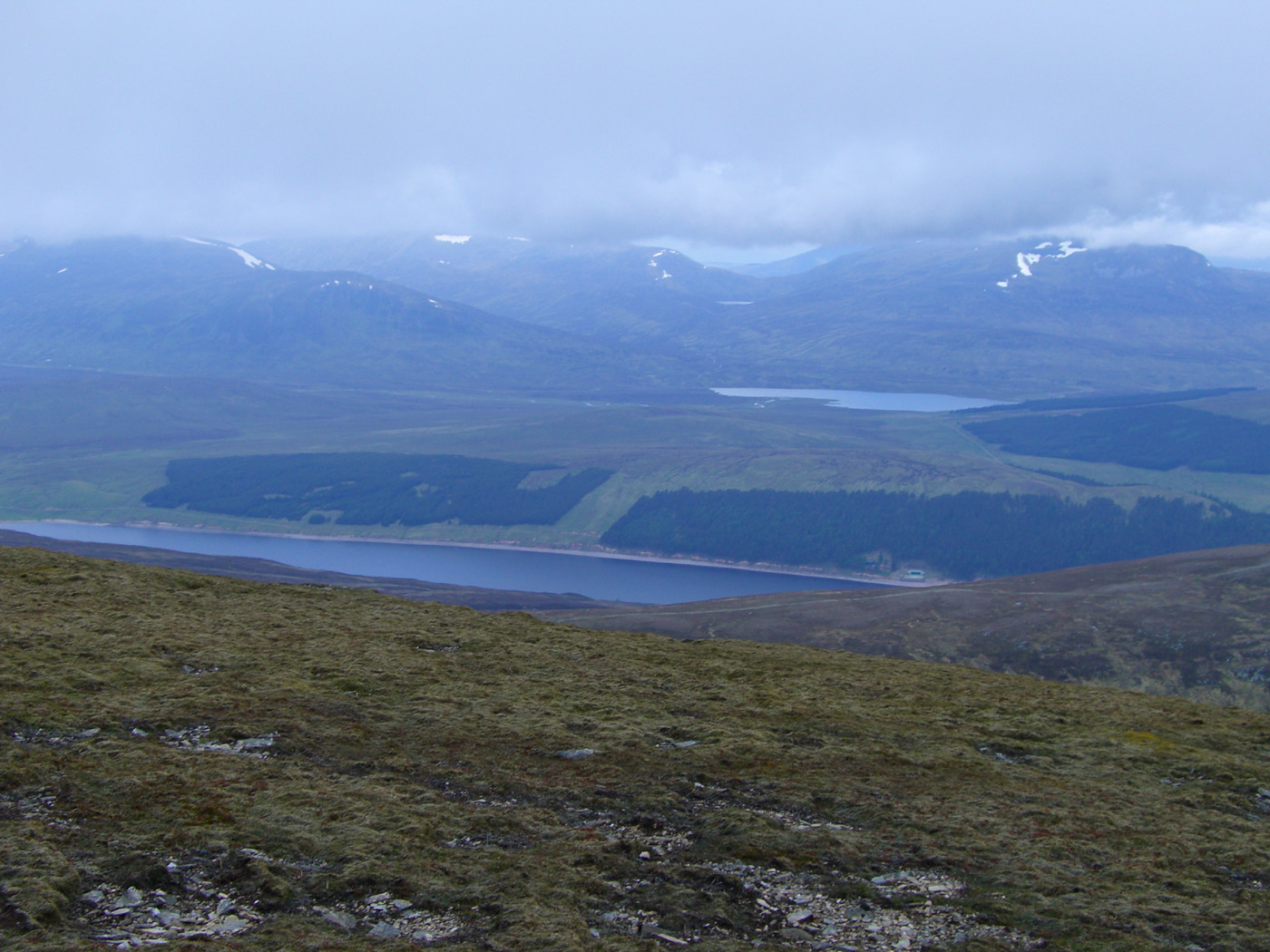
Looking west from the summit across Loch Ericht to Loch Pattack.

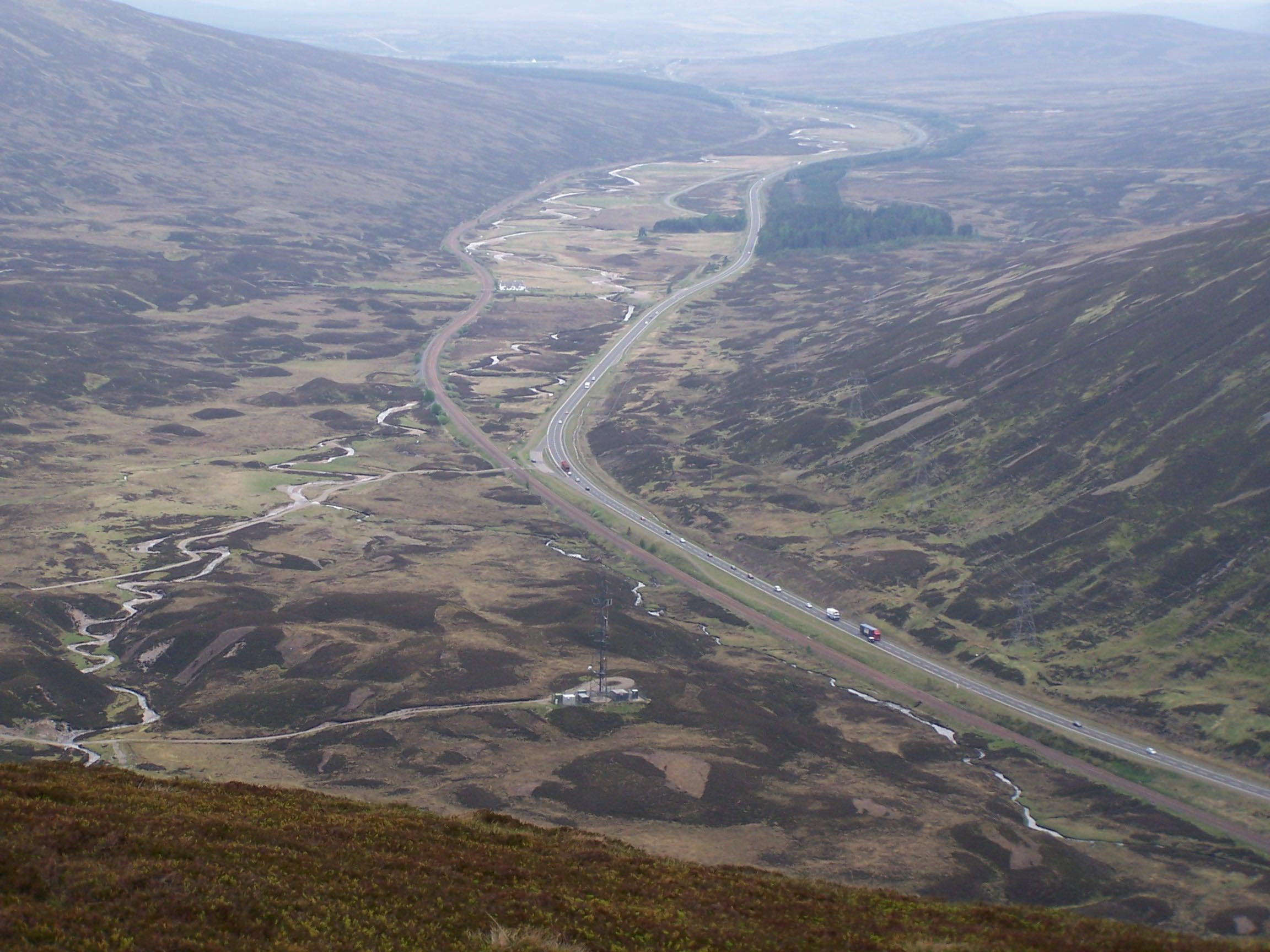
Looking down onto the Pass of Drumochter from the Boar of Badenoch.

A' Mharconaich (Scottish Gaelic: A' Mharcanaich) is a mountain near Dalwhinnie in the Scottish Highlands. It is a Munro with a height of 975 metres (3,199 ft). It is in a group of mountains east of Loch Ericht and west of the A9 road and Pass of Drumochter, and are known accordingly as the Drumochter Hills. A' Mharconaich is just within the Cairngorms National Park although it is not part of the Cairngorms mountains.

== Overview ==
A' Mharconaich is a Munro of height 975 metres (3199 feet). It is well seen by travellers on the A9 to which it shows it more steeper and rugged eastern flanks with a high corrie located just beneath the summit. The mountain's names translates from Gaelic as "the horse place" and dates from a time when horses were a valuable element of the economy of the region: places where horses gathered would be noted and named accordingly. The hill is crossed by the border between Perth and Kinross and Highland areas or in the old day Perthshire and Inverness-shire and is marked by old rusting fence posts which can be used as an aid to navigation when traversing the hill.

== Geography ==
A' Mharconaich has a SW-NE orientated summit ridge, just over a kilometre long with high points at each end. The NE summit is regarded as the highest point and this has been confirmed by an Abney Level survey which found the SW top, named Bruach nan Iomairean, to be a few metres lower. The 1974 edition of Munro's Tables moved the summit to the SW top, possibly in error, but the location reverted to the original summit in 1981. A' Mharconaich throws out two fine steep ridges on either side of the eastern corrie. The NE ridge descends initially as a steep buttress before easing and continuing for three km to reach the A9 at Balsporran Cottages.

The less well defined eastern ridge descends steeply from Bruach nan Iomairean to a col with a height of approximately 655 metres which links to the hill the Boar of Badenoch also known as An Torc. The line of old fence posts can be followed the whole way. The Boar reaches a height of 739 metres and is a Graham Top. It is a fine viewpoint down into the Pass of Drumochter.

To the SW A' Mharconaich links to the adjacent Munro of Beinn Udlamain, again following the fence posts for four km across undulating ground with little loss of height. This area is often teeming with deer being part of the Dalnaspidal deer forest. 2.5 km to the north is another Munro, Geal-chàrn which is reached by descending to a height of 739 metres and traversing around the head of Coire Fhar. Drainage from A' Mharconaich reaches the east coast of Scotland but is divided by the Pass of Drumochter, either going north to join the River Spey or south to meet the River Tay.

== Ascents and view ==
There are two starting points for the direct ascent of A' Mharconaich and several permutations if it is being climbed in conjunction with other hills as it usually is. One route starts on the A9 at the top of the Pass of Drumochter at grid reference NN632755 and goes up Coire Dhomhain for just over a kilometre and then ascending NW to the col between A' Mharconaich and the Boar of Badenoch from where the line of fence posts is followed steeply to the summit ridge. This starting point can be used for a complete circuit of Coire Dhomhain taking in the other two Munros of Sgairneach Mhòr and Beinn Udlamain.

An alternative start is at Balsporran cottages (NN627791), and offers a direct ascent up the NE ridge or a longer walk which takes in the adjoining Munro of Geal-chàrn. The summit is marked by a substantial collection of stones which has been shaped in to a wind shelter rather than the usual cairn. The view includes Loch Ericht and Loch Pattack to the NW and the Ben Alder massif.
