= A' Bhuidheanach Bheag =

Mountain in Scotland

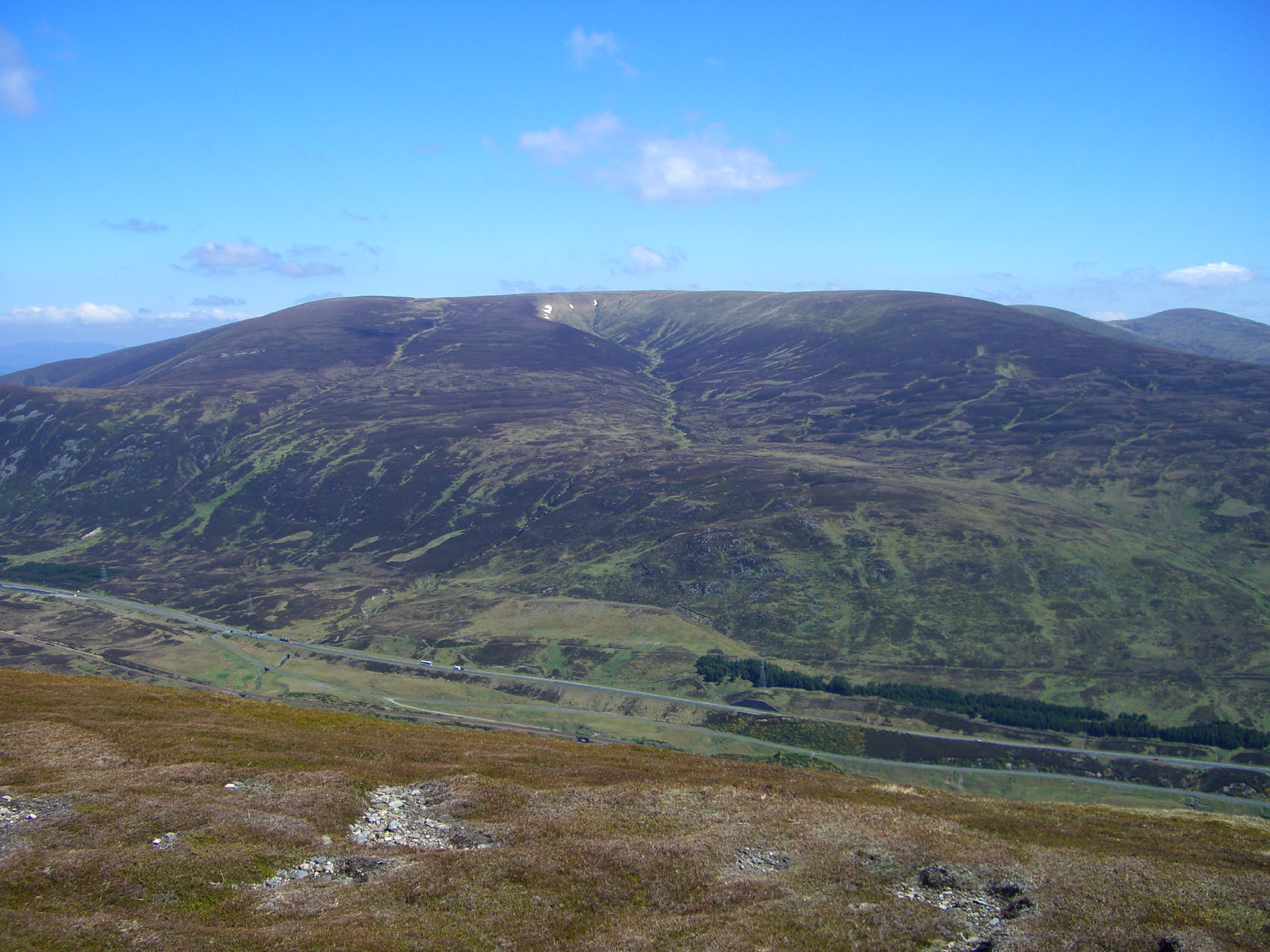
- A' Bhuidheanach Bheag seen across the Pass of Drumochter from The Sow of Atholl.

Highest point
- Elevation: 936 m (3,071 ft)
- Prominence: c. 111 m
- Listing: Munro
- Coordinates: 56°52′15″N 4°11′54″W

Naming
- English translation: Little Yellow Place
- Language of name: Gaelic
- Pronunciation: Scottish Gaelic: [ə ˈvujanəx ˈvek]

Geography
- Location within Perth and Kinross
- Location: Atholl, Perth and Kinross, Scotland
- Parent range: Grampian Mountains
- OS grid: NN660776
- Topo map: OS Landranger 42, OS Explorer 394

Listed summits of A' Bhuidheanach Bheag
Name	Grid ref	Height	Status
Glas Mheall Mòr	NN680769	928 m (3,045 ft)	Munro Top

A' Bhuidheanach Bheag is a Scottish mountain situated on the eastern side of the Pass of Drumochter, some 24 km WNW of Blair Atholl. The mountain straddles the border between Highland and Perth and Kinross council areas although the actual summit is in the latter.

== Overview ==
The high ground to the east side of the Pass of Drumochter takes the form of a huge undulating plateau, with an average height of over 800 metres, which stretches NE for 13 km to Loch an t-Seilich in the Gaick Forest. This area is often dismissed as uninteresting countryside, however it does contain two Munros which draws many walkers to the locale. A' Bhuidheanach Bheag lies to the southern end of the plateau and when viewed from the A9 road it shows many shallow ravines and gullies. The actual summit is out of sight from the A9 being sited back from the edge of the plateau. The rolling nature of the terrain makes A' Bhuidheanach Bheag a good hill for ski mountaineering.

Despite its understated reputation A' Bhuidheanach Bheag does offer the walker the feeling of space and the wide open skies of the high Grampian Mountains. Its gentle curving slopes have much wildlife with Eurasian dotterel, ptarmigan, grouse and mountain hare seen on a regular basis. The hill's name translates from the Gaelic language as “Little Yellow Place” and is thought to refer to the coarse yellow grass which grows on its slopes. The “Little” part of the name is slightly confusing as the hill is the highest point on the southern part of the plateau but demonstrates that the hill was named from how it looked from the valley not by its altitude.

== Geography and geology ==
A' Bhuidheanach Bheag's best geographical feature is the remote Cama Choire on the eastern side of the mountain. This is a steep sided valley which cuts deeply into the hill and is drained by the Allt a’ Chama Choire. The coire is well seen from the hill of An Dun above the Gaick Pass. From a geological point of view the most interesting characteristic of the mountain is Coire Mhic-sith on its south-western flank. The coire is a deeply incised, fault-guided valley which has received the attention of geologists, especially the School of Geoscience at the University of Edinburgh who have concluded that the presence of glacial silt and sand in the valley along with a glacial spillway to the adjacent valley of the Edendon Water means that the coire had a large ice dammed lake during the last Ice age. This Proglacial lake drained away when the ice melted but has left evidence similar, but on a lesser scale, to the “parallel roads” in Glen Roy.

The summit of the mountain is a gentle rise on the plateau and is only made obvious by the presence of an OS trig point. There are occasional quartzite outcrops across the summit plateau and some of the boulders have been collected to surround the trig point, a few iron fence post have also been included. The OS map also shows a 936-metre spot height, half a kilometre to the west of the recognised summit. The summit is crossed by a line of old rusting boundary fence posts and these lead unerringly to the adjoining Munro of Càrn na Caim which lies five km to the north across a boggy col with a height of 825 metres.

A'Bhuidheanach Bheag has two subsidiary tops over 3,000 feet in height. Glas Mheall Mòr (928 metres), just over two km to the ESE, is a Top in the current edition of Munro's Tables. Meall a' Chaorainn (916 metres) is located 1.5 km to the west of the summit and was deleted from the tables in 1981. All drainage from the mountain finds its way to the east coast of Scotland, the majority goes south to join the River Tay while a smaller percentage goes north via Glen Truim to join the River Spey.

== Ascents ==
A' Bhuidheanach Bheag is usually climbed from the A9 road, there are two possible starting points, Balsporan Cottages (NN627791) or 1.5 km to the north at the foot of Coire Chuirn. A more interesting route starts from the secluded country to the east at the ruined Sronphadruig Lodge and ascends by the Cama Choire to reach the plateau. Many walkers will continue to the adjacent Munro of Càrn na Caim, the plateau is quite featureless and a map and compass is necessary in misty conditions.
