= The Sow of Atholl =

Hill in Atholl, Scotland

Coordinates: 56.8371°N 4.2565°W

- Scottish Gaelic: Meall an Dobharchain
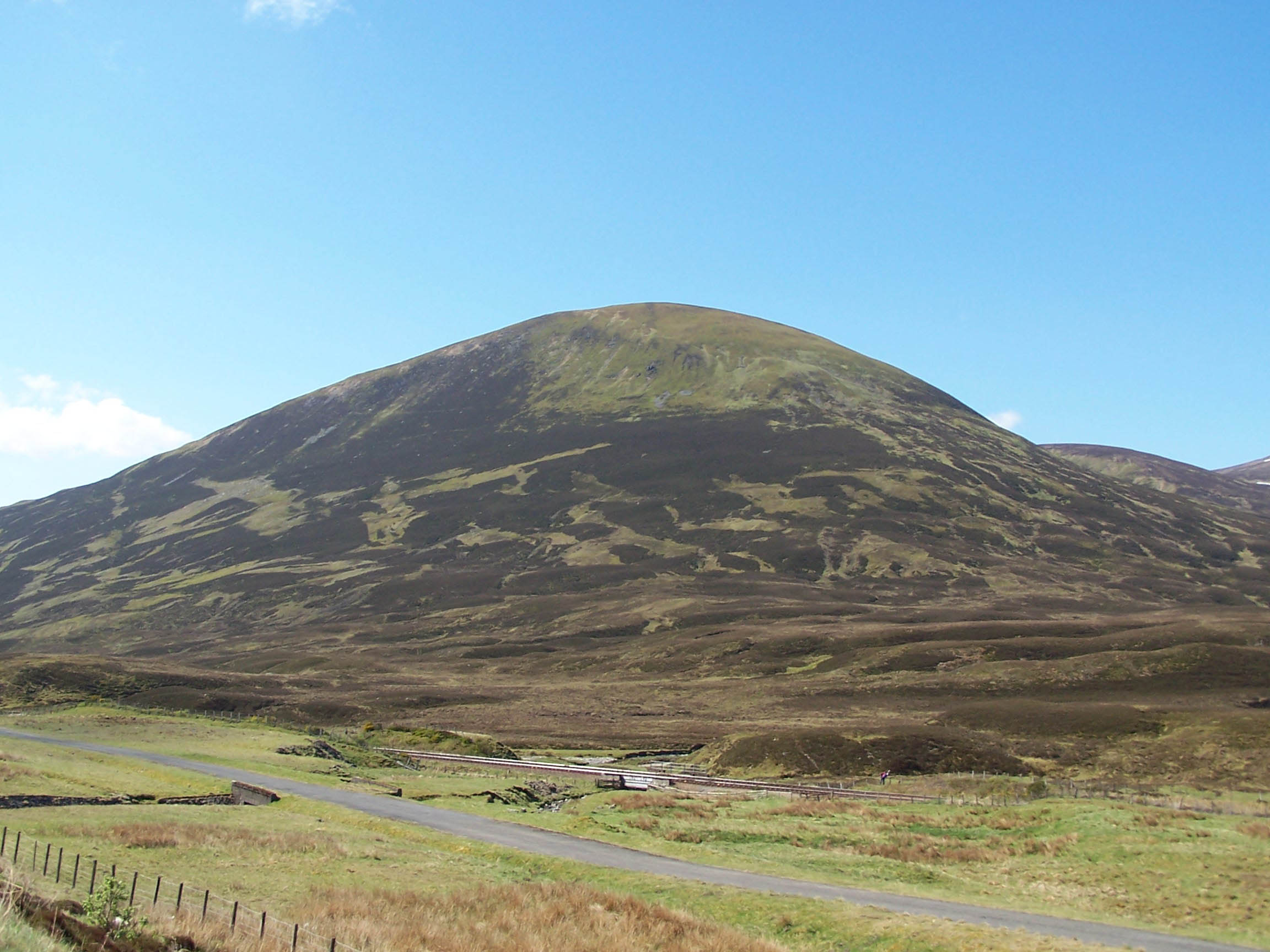
- Seen from A9 road at the summit of the Pass of Drumochter.

Highest point
- Elevation: 803 m (2,635 ft)
- Prominence: 166 m (545 ft)
- Listing: Corbett, Marilyn

Naming
- English translation: Watercress Hill (Meall an Dobharchain)
- Language of name: Gaelic
- Pronunciation: English: /ˈsaʊ əv ˈæθəl/ Scottish Gaelic: [ˈmjaul̪ˠ ən̪ˠ ˈt̪o.əɾxɛɲ]

Geography
- Location: Atholl, Perth and Kinross, Scotland
- Parent range: Grampians
- OS grid: NN624741
- Topo map: OS Landranger 42, OS Explorer 394

The Sow of Atholl (Scottish Gaelic: Meall an Dobharchain) is a Scottish hill which is situated 27 kilometres west-northwest of the town of Blair Atholl in Perth and Kinross council area. It stands on the western side of the Pass of Drumochter in a group of hills which lie around Coire Dhomhain.

== Overview ==
The Sow is a steep conical hill which reaches a height of 803 metres (2634 feet); it qualifies as a Corbett and a Marilyn. It throws down its least precipitous slopes to the SE in a broad ridge to Dalnaspidal Lodge from where the hill is often climbed. It stands immediately next to the A9 and the Highland Main Line as they pass the highest point of the Drumochter Pass and the hill is well seen from the road and railway. The hill's strange Anglicised name is believed to be a "more recent and fanciful name", a response to match the hill known as the Boar of Badenoch which lies 2.5 km to the north. Its more ancient and correct name is Meall an Dobharchain which translates from the Scottish Gaelic as Watercress Hill and this refers to the marshy ground on the lower SE flanks of the hill where watercress would have grown in the past. Although Watercress Hill is the accepted translation today, in 1854 The New Statistical Account Of Scotland referred to the hill as Carnan Dóbhrain which can be translated as Small Cairn of the Otters.

== Geography ==
The Sow of Atholl is not a hill rich in geographical highlights, its steep slopes are covered in heather interspersed with grass and the occasional boulder. Its one noteworthy feature is the steep valley to the west of the hill which prevents a straightforward walk to the adjoining Munro of Sgairneach Mhòr which lies three km to the SW. The nameless steep glen has been cited as a fine example of a Parabolic glacial valley. It drops 200 metres from the summit plateau of the Sow in a short distance and although the slopes are not unmanageable for a walker, most will contour round the head of the valley when traversing between The Sow and Sgairneach Mhòr rather than take a direct route. The presence of this steep valley gives The Sow its required prominence to give it the status of a separate mountain. All rainfall on the hill goes south to join the drainage basin of the River Tay and reaches the east coast of Scotland at the Firth of Tay.

== Biology ==
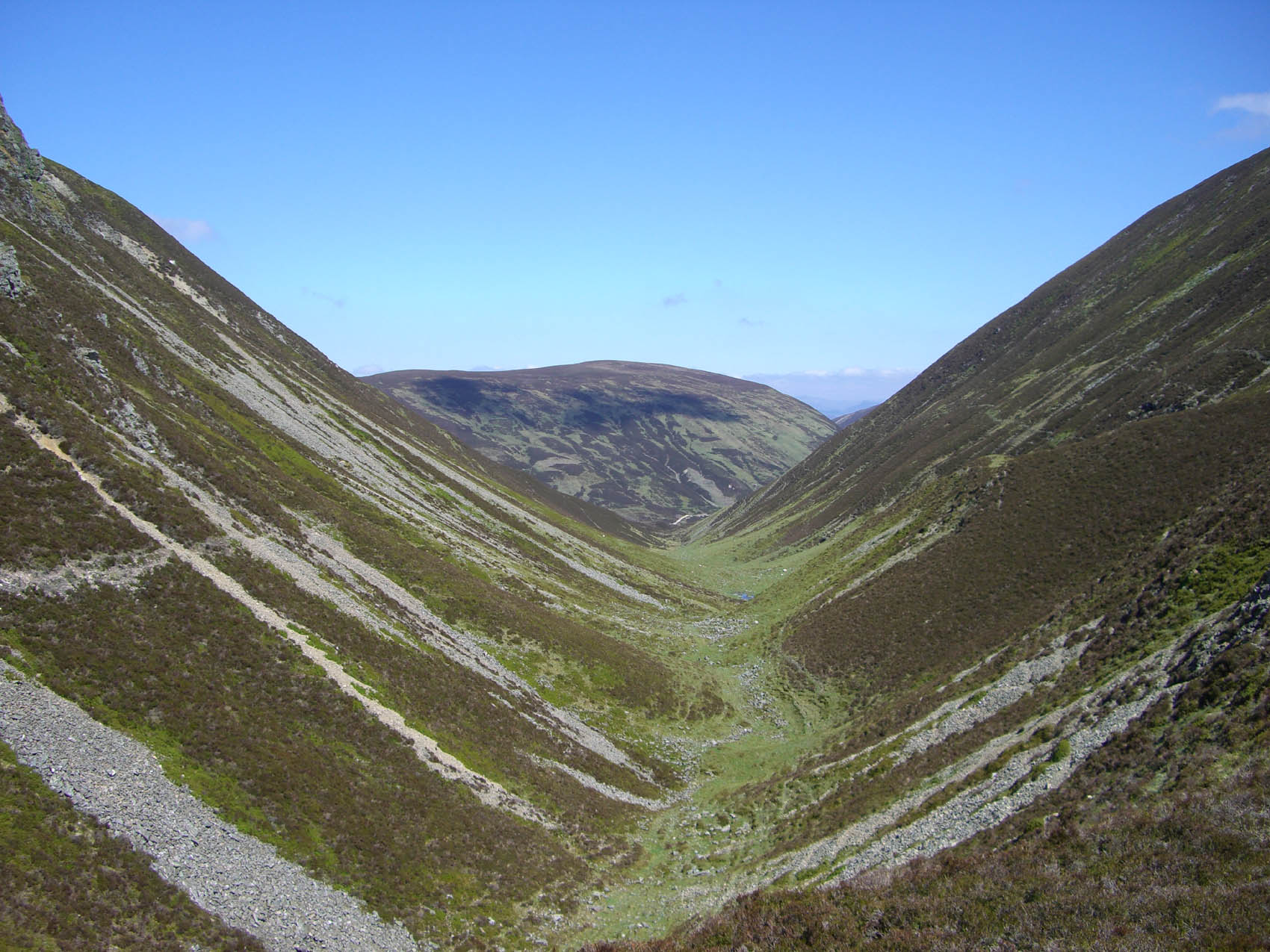
The glen to the west of the summit is a fine example of a parabolic glacial valley

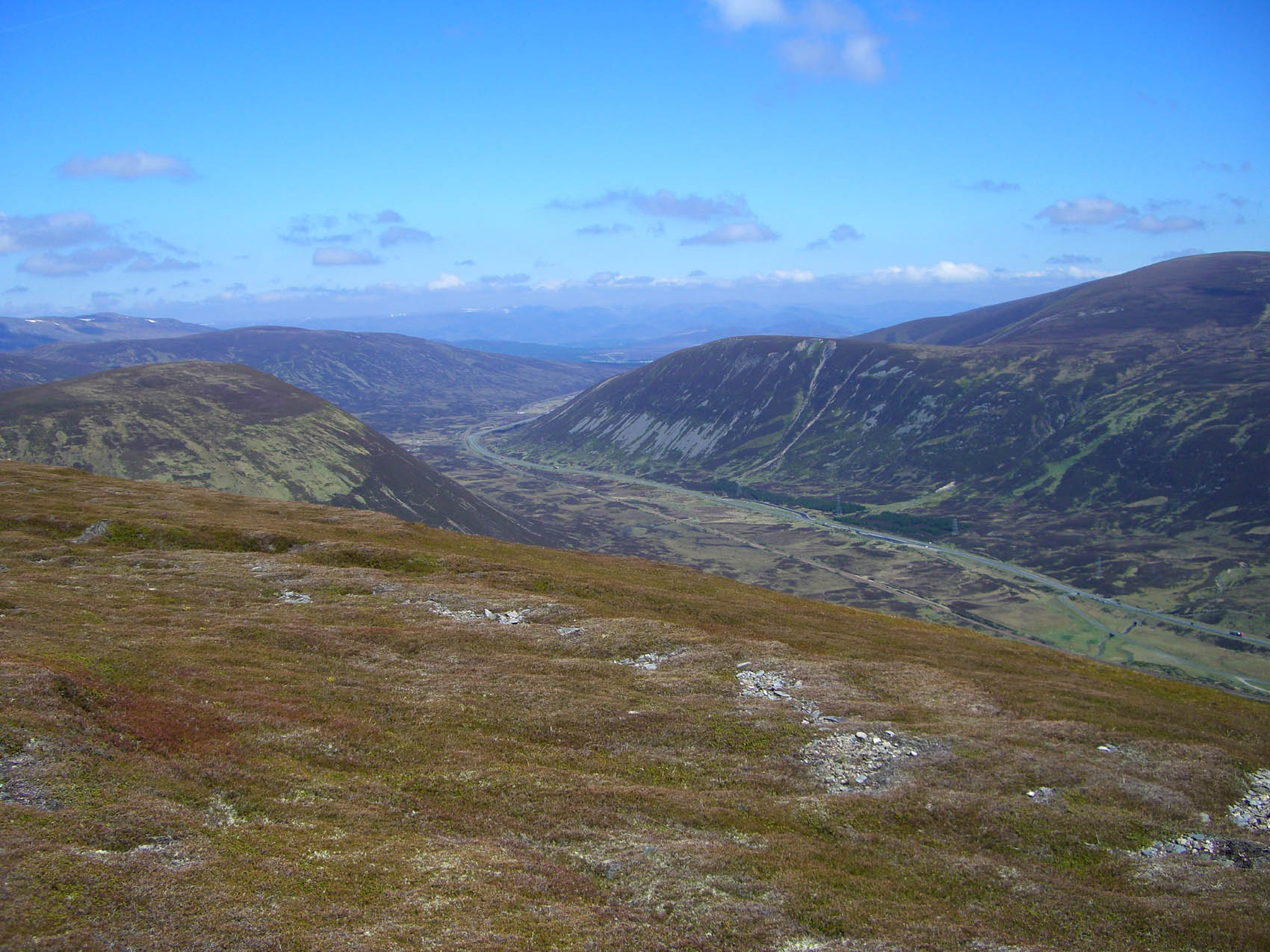
Looking north from the summit over the Pass of Drumochter

The Sow has several interesting biological specimens on its surface. Phyllodoce caerulea (Norwegian blue heather) is to be found growing on its slopes, this is a subarctic plant which requires steep, partially stabilised block scree slopes and peaty soil. At one time The Sow of Atholl was thought to be only site in the British Isles where Phyllodoce caerulea grew but it has now been located growing in the Ben Alder range as well. Other plants native to subarctic regions such as Cornus suecica (Eurasian dwarf cornel) and Sibbaldia procumbens are to be found on the hill.

== Ascents and view ==
The Sow of Atholl is climbed directly from the A9 road and with a starting altitude of around 400 metres it is not a hard climb. The most popular point to commence a direct ascent is Dalnaspidal Lodge (NN646732) where there is lay-by parking. The flat area around the lodge is quite boggy and is prone to flooding after wet weather due to presence of a sluice dam. The route goes straight up the SE flanks of the hill which are its least steep. The start at Dalnaspidal gives the opportunity to climb The Sow along with the Corbett Meall na Leitreach which lies five km to the south across Loch Garry. Another possible starting point is 2.5 km further north on the A9 at the summit of the Pass of Drumochter although the climb from here is steeper. The Sow can be climbed as part of a round of Coire Dhomhain, taking in the other Munros of Sgairneach Mhòr, Beinn Udlamain and A' Mharconaich. The top of the hill is marked by a small cairn made up of a few rocks. The highlight of the view is a fine prospect both north and south down the Pass of Drumochter.
