= Ericht =

Ericht may refer to multiple geographical features in Scotland:

- Loch Ericht, a lake in the council areas of Perth and Kinross, and Highland
- River Ericht, a river in Perth and Kinross
- River Ericht, Rannoch, a river in Perth and Kinross
