= River Truim =

Right bank tributary of the River Spey in the Scottish Highlands

Coordinates: 57°02′N 4°10′W

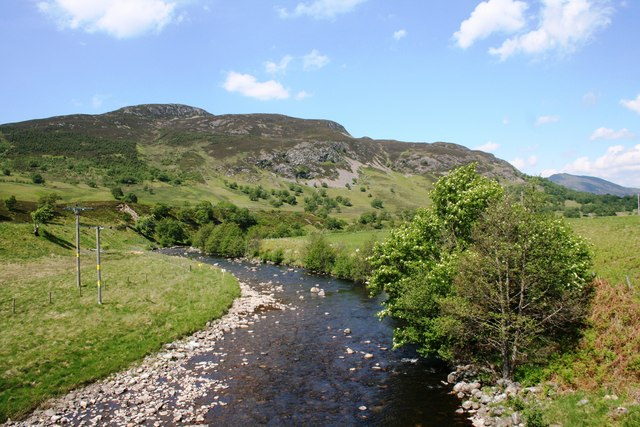
River Truim near Etteridge

The River Truim (Abhainn Truim in Gaelic) is a right bank tributary of the River Spey in the Scottish Highlands. Its headwaters meet to the north of the Pass of Drumochter and flow northwards as the Truim past the dam at the northern end of Loch Ericht and through the village of Dalwhinnie, highest village in the Scottish Highlands. The distillery at Dalwhinnie producing Dalwhinnie Single Malt is also the highest in Scotland. The waters of its most significant tributary, the Allt Cuaich, are diverted in part along an aqueduct to Loch Ericht. The river continues north-northeastwards down Glen Truim, over the Falls of Truim and on to meet the Spey 2.5 miles (4 km) southwest of Newtonmore. It is closely followed for almost its entire length by both the A9 road and the mainline railway from Perth to Inverness.

== Etymology ==
The name 'Truim' is an anglicisation of the Gaelic word for 'elder tree'.
