= List of listed buildings in Laggan, Badenoch =

This is a list of listed buildings in the parish of Laggan in Badenoch, in the Highland council area of Scotland.

== List ==
Name	Location	Date Listed	Grid Ref. (Note: Sometimes known as OSGB36, the grid reference (where provided) is based on the British national grid reference system used by the Ordnance Survey. • "Guide to National Grid". Ordnance Survey. • "Get-a-map". Ordnance Survey.)	Geo-coordinates	Notes	LB Number (Note: Historic Environment Scotland assign a unique alphanumeric identifier to each designated site in Scotland, for listed buildings this always begins with "LB", for example "LB12345".)	Image
Garvamore "Barracks"				57°00′59″N 4°25′34″W	Category A	6899	Upload another image
Lime Kiln	Kinloch Laggan			56°58′32″N 4°24′28″W	Category C(S)	6908	Upload Photo
Catlodge, Catlodge Lodge And Gate Piers				57°00′24″N 4°15′07″W	Category B	6912	Upload Photo
Catlodge Cottages				57°00′23″N 4°15′02″W	Category C(S)	6913	Upload Photo
Dalchully House				57°00′44″N 4°18′56″W	Category C(S)	6896	Upload Photo
Dalwhinnie Distillery and Bonded Warehouse	Dalwhinnie			56°56′24″N 4°14′21″W	Category B	6898	Upload another image See more images
Falls Of Truim, Old Schoolhouse Including Garden Walls				57°00′15″N 4°10′29″W	Category C(S)	49646	Upload Photo
Melgarve, Corrieyairack Pass, Bridge Over Allt Feith A Mhoraire				57°01′50″N 4°31′29″W	Category B	12373	Upload Photo
Glentruim House Stables (By Newtonmore)				57°01′39″N 4°10′36″W	Category C(S)	6906	Upload Photo
Ardverikie House, Outbuildings, Game Larders, Boat House And Walled Garden				56°57′19″N 4°27′15″W	Category A	6910	Upload another image See more images
Crubenmore Bridge				56°59′43″N 4°10′50″W	Category C(S)	50910	Upload Photo
Garvamore, Garva Bridge Over River Spey (St George's Bridge)				57°01′12″N 4°26′12″W	Category A	6900	Upload another image See more images
Glentruim House (By Newtonmore)				57°01′36″N 4°10′28″W	Category B	6903	Upload Photo
Glentruim House, Gate Lodge, Gates And Gatepiers (By Newtonmore)				57°01′26″N 4°09′54″W	Category C(S)	6905	Upload Photo
Laggan Bridge, Laggan Parish Church And Burial Ground, Church Of Scotland	Laggan			57°01′09″N 4°16′57″W	Category B	6909	Upload another image See more images
Ardverikie Gate Lodge, Gate Piers And Bridge Over River Pattack	Kinloch Laggan			56°58′30″N 4°24′18″W	Category A	6911	Upload another image See more images
Cluny Castle				57°01′11″N 4°13′57″W	Category A	6914	Upload Photo
Cluny Castle, Stable/Dwelling Range				57°01′17″N 4°14′02″W	Category B	6915	Upload Photo
Cluny Castle, East Lodge, Gates And Gate Piers				57°01′14″N 4°13′45″W	Category B	6916	Upload Photo
Corrieyairack Pass, Melgarve, Drummin Bridge Over Caoehan Riabhaeh Burn				57°01′49″N 4°32′00″W	Category B	6895	Upload Photo
Kinloch Laggan Old St Kenneth's Church And Burial Ground	Kinloch Laggan			56°58′31″N 4°24′42″W	Category C(S)	6907	Upload another image
Glentruim House Macpherson Of Glentruim Burial Ground (By Newtonmore)				57°01′46″N 4°10′37″W	Category C(S)	6904	Upload Photo
Cluny Castle, West Lodge And Gate Piers With Flanking Quadrants And End Pavilion				57°01′05″N 4°14′23″W	Category B	6917	Upload Photo
Craig Dhu Lodge				57°01′49″N 4°11′14″W	Category B	49688	Upload Photo
Glenshero Lodge				57°00′24″N 4°23′23″W	Category C(S)	6901	Upload Photo
Cluny Castle, Burial Ground				57°01′04″N 4°14′14″W	Category C(S)	6894	Upload Photo
Glen Shirra, Old Wade Bridge (Over Dry Burn)				57°00′25″N 4°22′54″W	Category B	6902	Upload Photo
Dalchully Bridge Over River Mashie				57°00′43″N 4°18′24″W	Category B	6897	Upload Photo

== Key ==
The scheme for classifying buildings in Scotland is:

- Category A: "buildings of national or international importance, either architectural or historic; or fine, little-altered examples of some particular period, style or building type."
- Category B: "buildings of regional or more than local importance; or major examples of some particular period, style or building type, which may have been altered."
- Category C: "buildings of local importance; lesser examples of any period, style, or building type, as originally constructed or moderately altered; and simple traditional buildings which group well with other listed buildings."

In March 2016 there were 47,288 listed buildings in Scotland. Of these, 8% were Category A, and 50% were Category B, with the remaining 42% being Category C.

== See also ==
- List of listed buildings in Highland
