= April 1981 United Kingdom snow storm =

Weather event in the United Kingdom

Meteorological history
- Formed: 22 April 1981
- Dissipated: 29 April 1981

Blizzard
- Highest winds: 40 mph (65 km/h) average
- Maximum snowfall or ice accretion: 66 cm (26 in): Gloucestershire

Overall effects
- Areas affected: Great Britain

An exceptionally late snow storm affected Great Britain between 23 and 26 April 1981. The snow event was of particular note for its lateness in the season and its intensity. Also associated with the pressure system was low temperatures. On the night of the 23rd, the temperature at Dalwhinnie fell to −11.0 °C (12.2 °F).

== Snowfall totals ==
Totals across southern England, Wales, the Midlands and the North West widely exceeded 30 cm (12 in). On the 25th alone, 20 cm (7.9 in) were reported to have fallen across southern and western England and Wales. In total, 66 cm (26 in) was reported to have fallen in Gloucestershire. Also, there was level snow of 60 cm (24 in) around the Peak District with 20 ft (6.1 m) drifts reported in strong winds. Also 20 ft (6.1 m) high drifts were recorded in Derbyshire and Staffordshire.

== Temperatures ==
Along with a snow, temperatures were exceptionally below normal for this stage in April. At Birmingham, the temperature didn't exceed 3.0 °C (37.4 °F) between the 24th and 26th and in some places, the temperature remained permanently below 0 °C (32 °F). The lowest temperature of all was −11.0 °C (12.2 °F) on the night of the 23rd at Dalwhinnie. Usually at this stage in April, the temperature would be expected to reach around 16 °C (61 °F).

== Impacts and aftermath ==
The snow thawed very quickly, this led to major flooding in areas such as the east Midlands. In some places it was the worst flooding since the thaw of March 1947. There was also widespread disruption to power supplies, farming (particularly on Dartmoor), particularly livestock, and traffic. And also the Snake Pass in Derbyshire was closed because of the risk of an avalanche.
