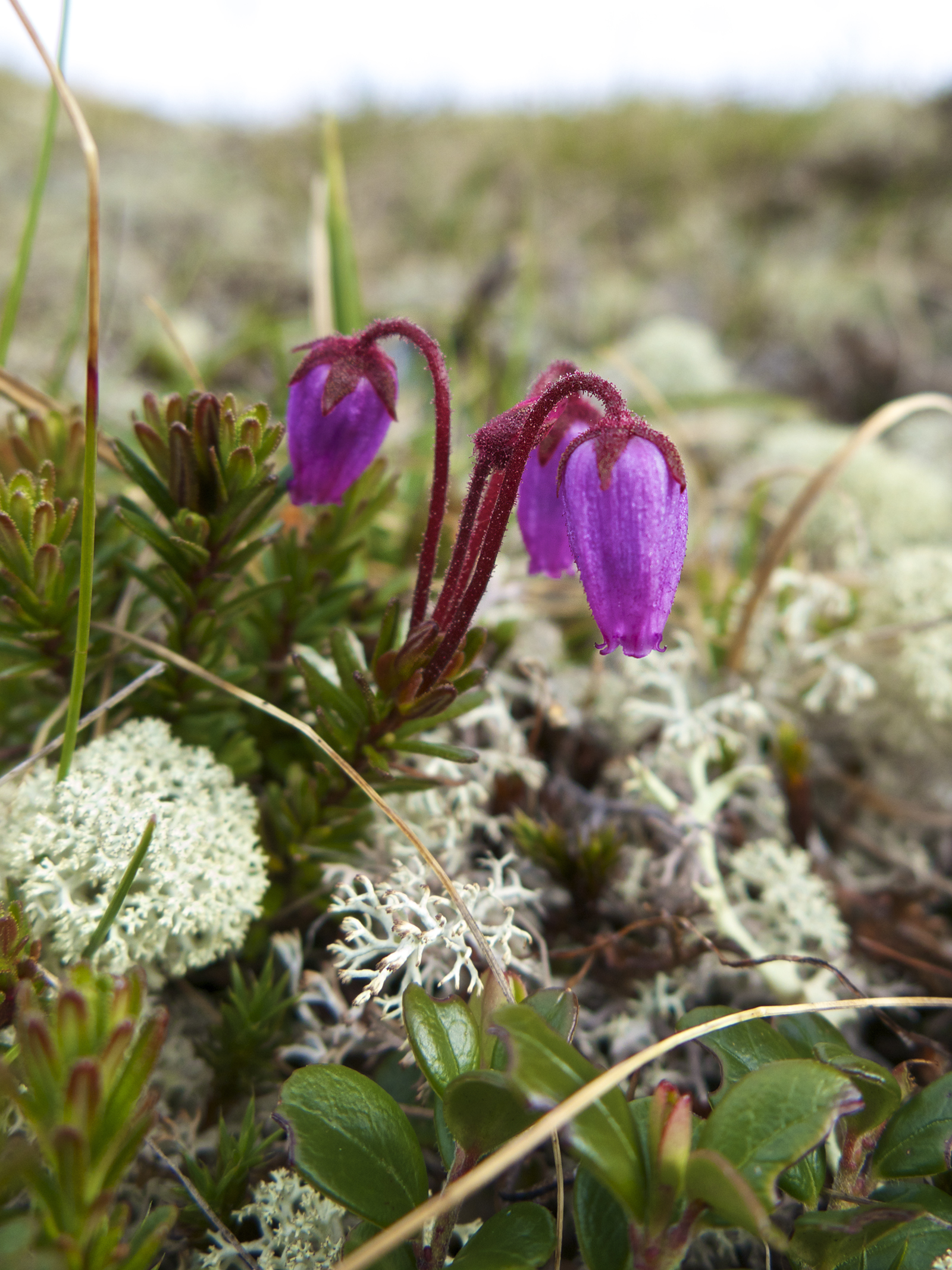

Conservation status
- Secure (NatureServe)

Scientific classification
- Kingdom: Plantae
- Clade: Tracheophytes
- Clade: Angiosperms
- Clade: Eudicots
- Clade: Asterids
- Order: Ericales
- Family: Ericaceae
- Genus: Phyllodoce
- Species: P. caerulea

Binomial name
- Phyllodoce caerulea (L.) Bab.

Synonyms
- Andromeda caerulea L.; Menziesia caerulea (L.) Sw.; Bryanthus caeruleus (L.) Dippel

= Phyllodoce caerulea =

Species of flowering plant

Phyllodoce caerulea, known as blue heath in British English and purple mountain heather or blue mountainheath in American English, is an evergreen species of dwarf shrub that grows up to around 15 cm (6 in) tall, and bears clusters of 2–6 purple flowers. It is native to boreal regions around the Northern Hemisphere, but with large gaps in its distribution.

== Description ==
Phyllodoce caerulea is a low shrub, typically growing 5–15 centimetres (2–6 in) high, and exceptionally reaching 25 cm (10 in). Its evergreen leaves are 4–10 mm (0.16–0.39 in) long and 1.7–3.6 mm (0.07–0.14 in) wide, and are borne on 1-millimetre (0.04 in) long petioles; they are arranged alternately.

The flowers are borne in clusters of 2–6; each flower is 8–12 mm (0.3–0.5 in) long, with a corolla composed of five fused petals that begin purple, but fade to a bluish pink. These are surrounded by five sepals, and themselves surround the 8–10 free stamens and a superior ovary that produces nectar at its base.

== Distribution ==
Phyllodoce caerulea has a patchy circumboreal distribution, with gaps between 110° W and 155° W and between 70° E and 125° E.

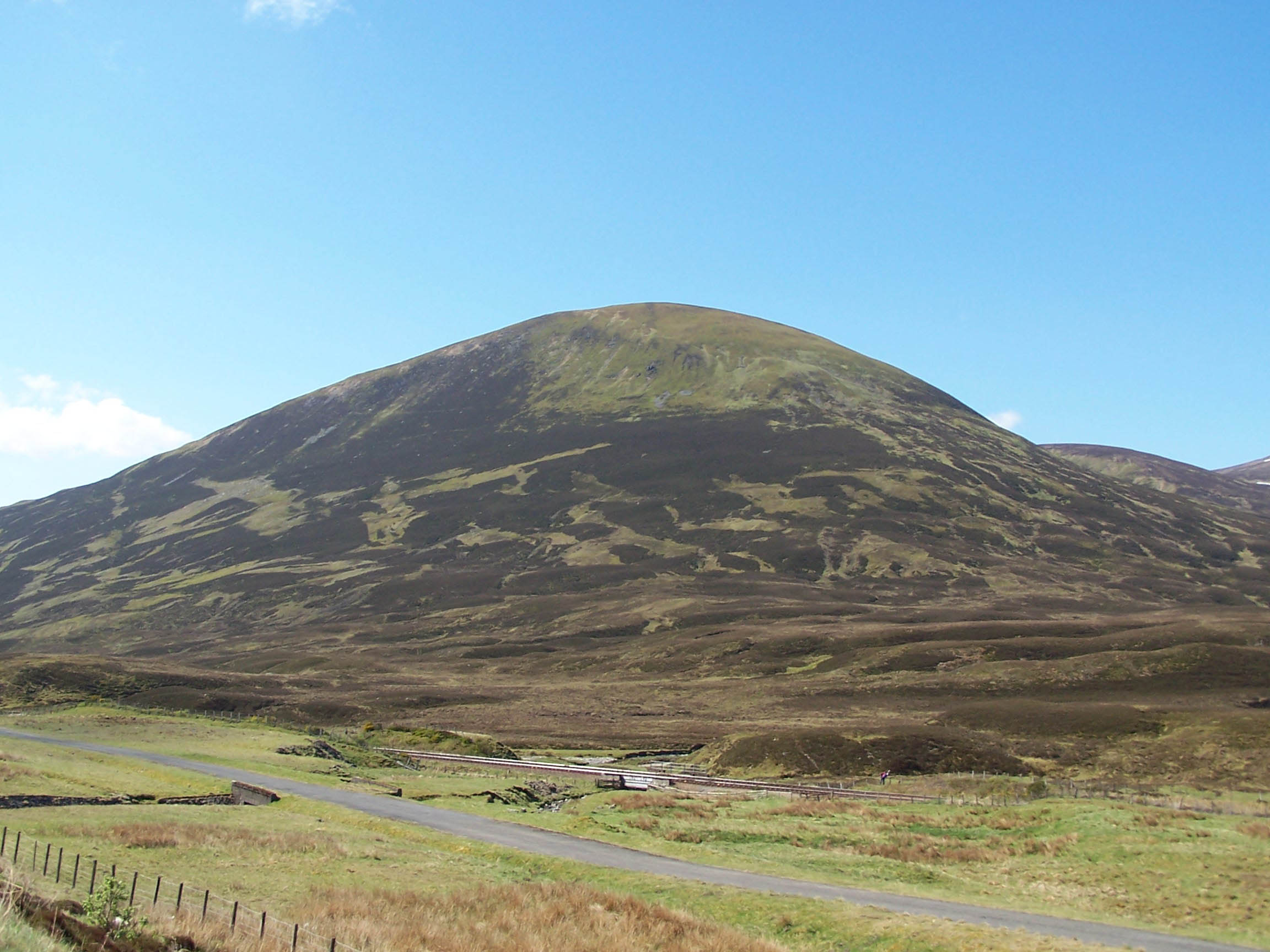
The Sow of Atholl from the north, including the site where P. caerulea was first discovered in the British Isles, in 1810.

In Europe, P. caerulea is found from Iceland to the Kanin Peninsula. Its Icelandic distribution is also disjunct, comprising the area around Eyjafjörður and a site near Desjarmyri. In the British Isles, P. caerulea is confined to a few sites in the Scottish Highlands. It was first discovered around a spring at an altitude of 740 metres (2,430 ft) on the slopes of the Sow of Atholl, but has since been found at a few sites in the Ben Alder forest. It became a protected species in the UK in 1975 under the Conservation of Wild Creatures and Wild Plants Act. There are reports of the plant's occurrence in the Swiss Alps, but no herbarium specimens have been found to confirm this. The species has not been observed on the Faroe Islands, Jan Mayen, Bjørnøya, Svalbard or Franz Josef Land.

In Asia, Phyllodoce caerulea occurs in the Ural Mountains, around Lake Baikal and in the Mongolian Khangai and Kentii mountains, but is absent from most of central Siberia. It occurs on Hokkaido, Sakhalin, the Kamchatka Peninsula and in Beringia.

In North America, P. caerulea is found in coastal Alaska, the Northwest Territories, Quebec and Labrador, as well as scattered sites in the Gaspé Peninsula and the White Mountains of New Hampshire and Vermont. It is widespread and common in Greenland. Its absence from the Yukon has been described as "surprising".

== Taxonomy ==
Phyllodoce caerulea was first described by Carl Linnaeus in his 1753 Species Plantarum, as a species in the genus Andromeda. It was transferred to the genus Phyllodoce by Cardale Babington in his 1843 Manual of British Botany. In Japan, P. caerulea hybridises with the pale yellowish-flowering species P. aleutica to produce F_{1} offspring with flowers that are pink, orange or striped in pink and yellowish white.
