= Lochan a' Garbh Coire =

Freshwater lake in Scotland

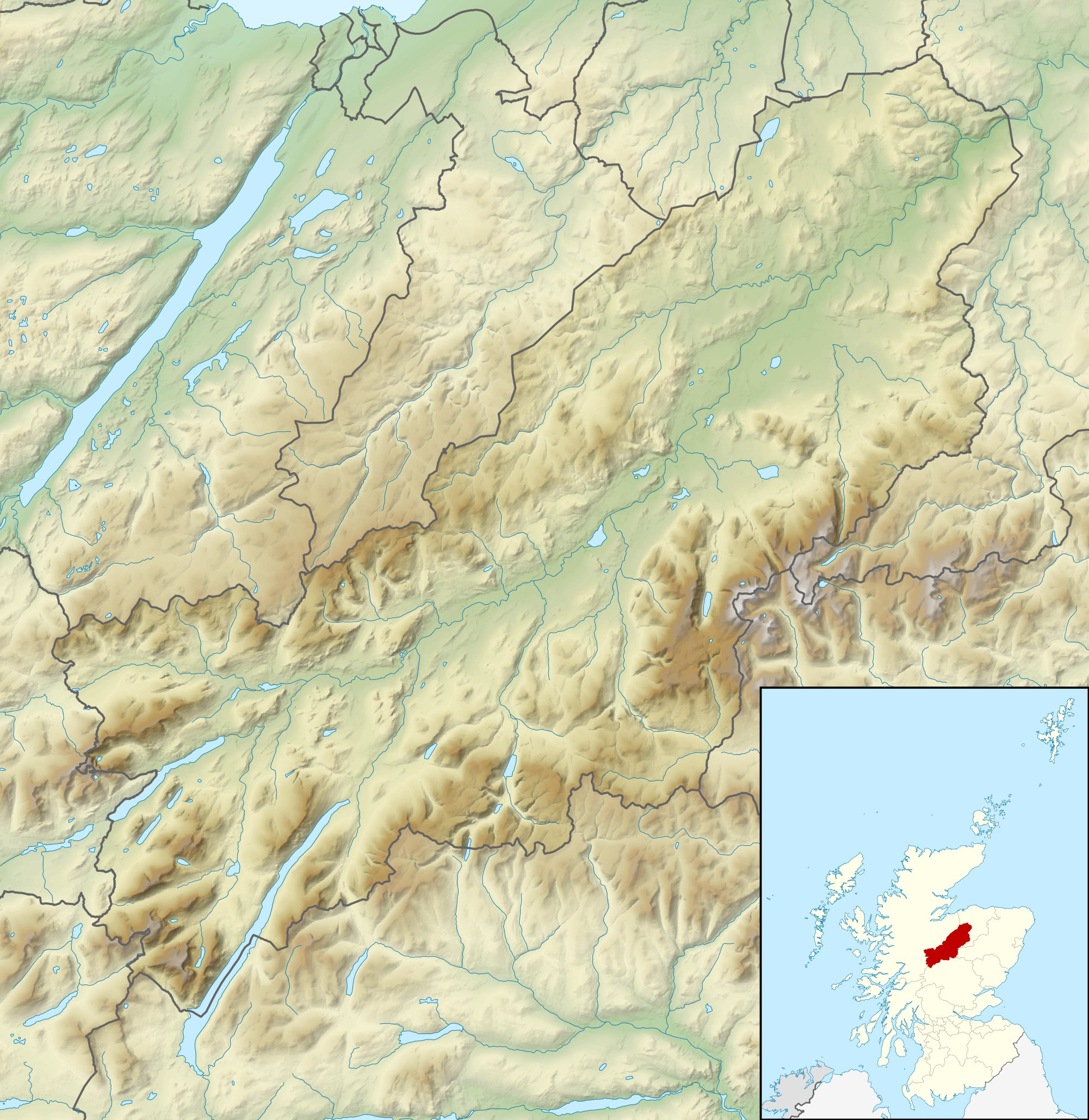
- Location within Badenoch and Strathspey
- Location: Cairngorms, Grampian Mountains, Scotland
- Coordinates: 56°48′39.3″N 4°28′4.3″W
- Primary outflows: None
- Basin countries: Scotland
- Max. length: 70 m (230 ft)
- Max. width: 20 m (66 ft)
- Surface area: 1,250 m^{2} (13,500 sq ft)
- Surface elevation: 1,120 m (3,670 ft)

Lochan a' Garbh Coire is a small freshwater loch located below the summit of Ben Alder in the Highlands of Scotland. At over 1,120 m (3,670 ft) above sea level, it is among the highest named bodies of water in the British Isles.
