= River Ericht, Rannoch =

River in Perth and Kinross, Scotland

Coordinates: 56.710°N 4.437°W

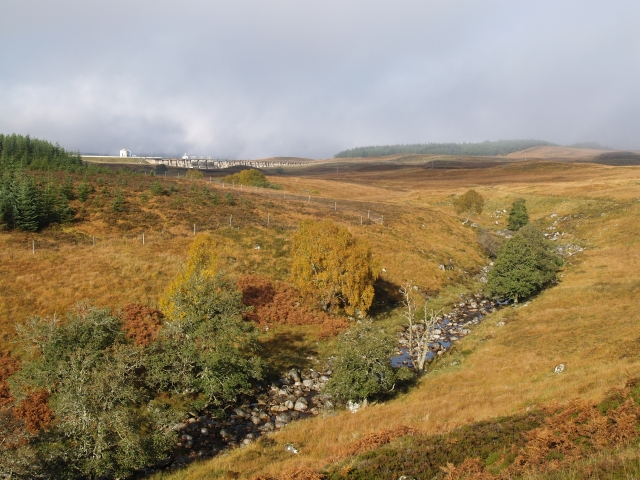
River Ericht below Loch Ericht

The River Ericht (Scottish Gaelic: Eireachd) is a short river which flows generally southwards from the southern end of Loch Ericht for 3 miles / 5 km to enter Loch Rannoch near its western end at Bridge of Ericht.
