= Dalwhinnie distillery =

Whisky distillery in Highland, Scotland

Coordinates: 56°56′24.46″N 4°14′17.02″W

Dalwhinnie Distillery
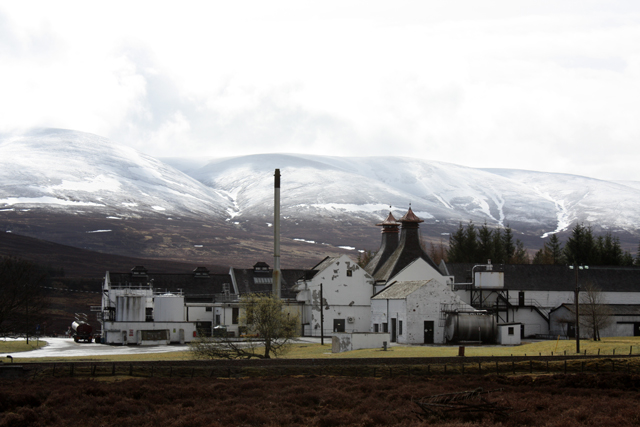
- Location: Dalwhinnie
- Owner: Diageo
- Founded: 1898
- Founder: John Grant, George Sellar and Alexander Mackenzie
- Architect: Charles Chree Doig
- Status: Active
- Water source: Allt an t-Sluic
- No. of stills: 1 wash still: 17,000 L; 1 spirit still: 14,000 L
- Capacity: 1,300,000 L

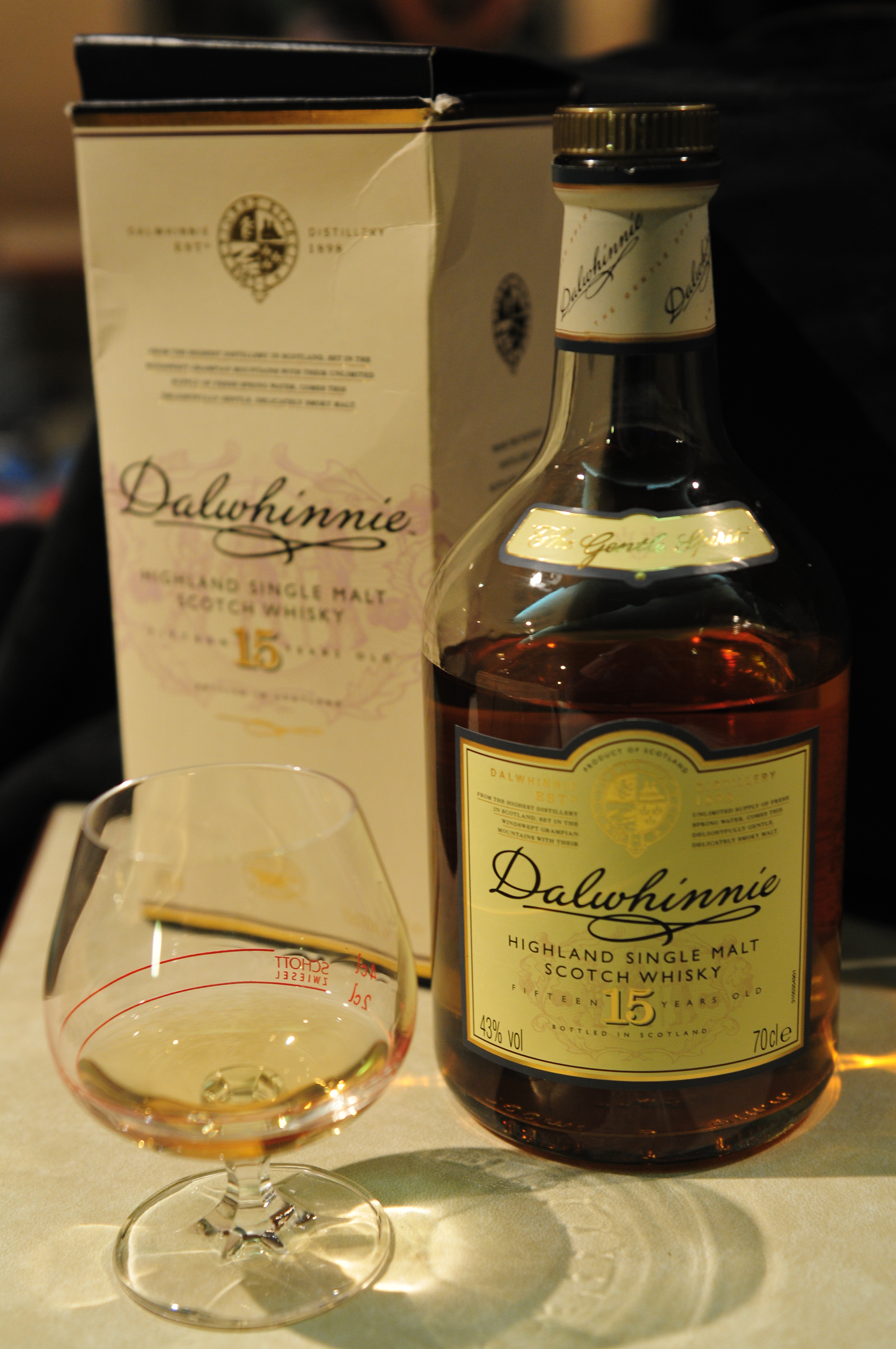

The Dalwhinnie Distillery, located in the Highland village of Dalwhinnie in Scotland, produces single malt Scotch whisky. The Dalwhinnie Distillery is located in the Badenoch and Strathspey ward of the Highland Council and so is in the Speyside region as defined by the Scottish Whisky Association (SWA). SWA regulations place the full Speyside region within the boundaries of the Highlands, and so Speyside distilleries are allowed to label their whisky as Highland. The distillery is owned by Diageo.

The site for the distillery was chosen for its access to the available clear spring water from Lochan-Doire-Uaine and abundant peat from the surrounding bogs.

Set in mountain scenery, Dalwhinnie is the highest distillery in Scotland, at 326 m (1,070 ft) above sea level.

The name Dalwhinnie is derived from the Gaelic Dail Chuinnidh, which means meeting place, referring to the meeting of ancient cattle drovers' routes through the mountains.

== History ==
In 1897, John Grant of Grantown-on-Spey, George Sellar of Kingussie, and designer Alexander Mackenzie of Kingussie, put up an estimated £10,000 to build the Strathspey Distillery at Dalwhinnie between the Great North Road and the Highland Railway. Mackenzie had previous experience with designing a distillery in Kingussie. In February 1898, production began but by the summer the venture was already in liquidation. In October, A. P. Blyth bought the distillery for his son and renamed it Dalwhinnie announcing 'considerable improvements on the building and plant'.

In 1905, the largest distillers in the United States, Cook and Bernheimer, bought the distillery at auction for just £1,250. A huge warehouse in Leith blended Dalwhinnie with other whiskies "to suit the American palate". In 1919, prohibition hit America. Dalwhinnie returned to Scottish hands; they were those of Sir James Calder, chairman of Macdonald Greenlees, and blenders in Leith. In 1926, Macdonald Greenlees was itself acquired; by the Distillers Company Ltd. (DCL). Dalwhinnie gained its fifth owner in under thirty years and was licensed to James Buchanan and Co.

On 1 February 1934, a fire closed the distillery for four years; perhaps coincidentally this was also the year in which electricity first came to the village, replacing paraffin lamps. As rebuilding continued, winter snowdrifts 20 ft (6.1 m) high hampered work in 1937.After four years Dalwhinnie re-opened in April 1938. Dalwhinnie shut down in 1940 as a result of wartime restrictions on the use of barley.

In 1961, the wash stills were converted to steam heating from a coal-fired boiler. In 1968, the maltings ceased production. Barley was now brought in from specialist maltsters for greater control over peatiness and alcohol yield. In 1969, British Rail closed the distillery's private siding; Dalwhinnie whiskies now left for the south by road.

In 1972, oil-firing replaced coal. In 1987, the distillery became part of United Distillers. United Distillers was a Scottish company formed in 1987 combining the businesses of Distillers Company and Arthur Bell & Sons, both owned by Guinness. During a modernisation of the Dalwhinnie plant the traditional worm tubs were removed and shell and tube condensers installed.

In 1989, Dalwhinnie became one of the Six Classic Malts of Scotland. A new visitor centre opened in 1991. The distillery was refitted in 1995: traditional worm tubs were reinstated, having been removed several years earlier.

In 1997, Diageo was formed from the merging of Guinness, Grand Metropolitan, and Dalwhinnie, becoming part of the drinks giant's portfolio.

== Variants ==
As of 2019, Dalwhinnie single malt whiskies are available in the following expressions:

- Standard 15-year-old
- More mature 25-, 29- and 36-year-olds
- Distillers Edition
- Winter's Gold

== See also ==
- Whisky
- Scotch whisky
- List of whisky brands
- List of distilleries in Scotland
