= Dalwhinnie =

Coordinates: 56.9348°N 4.2417°W

Dalwhinnie: Scottish Gaelic: Dail Chuinnidh
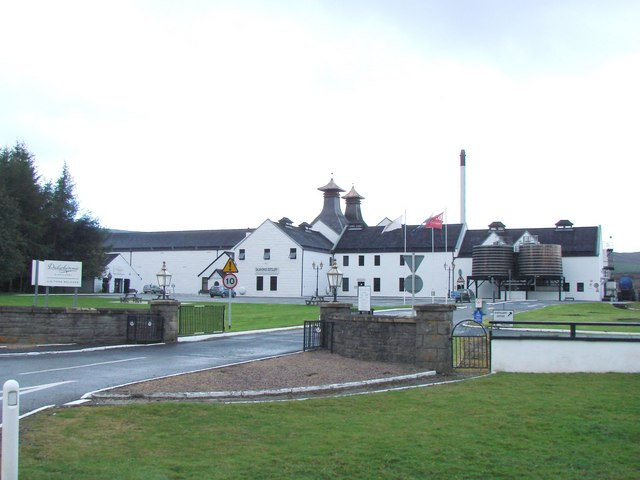
- Dalwhinnie distillery

- Location within the Badenoch and Strathspey area
- OS grid reference: NN634849
- Council area: Highland
- Country: Scotland
- Sovereign state: United Kingdom
- Post town: Dalwhinnie
- Postcode district: PH19
- Dialling code: 015282
- Police: Scotland
- Fire: Scottish
- Ambulance: Scottish
- UK Parliament: Moray West, Nairn and Strathspey
- Scottish Parliament: Skye, Lochaber and Badenoch

Dalwhinnie (/dælˈhwɪni/ dal-WHIN-ee; Scottish Gaelic: Dail Chuinnidh "meeting place") is a small village in the Scottish Highlands. Dalwhinnie is located at the head of Glen Truim and the north-east end of Loch Ericht, on the western edge of the Cairngorms National Park. It is located close to several definitions of the centre of Scotland. The village has a population of around 80 people.

== Location ==
Dalwhinnie sits at an altitude of 351 m (1,152 ft). It is one of the coldest villages in the UK, having an average annual temperature of 6.6 °C (43.9 °F), making it suitable for winter walking and mountaineering.

It is north of Drumochter, just off the A9 road from Perth to Inverness and has been bypassed since 1975. It is about 75 miles (121 km) from both Edinburgh and Glasgow, 25 miles (40 km) from Aviemore, 13 miles (21 km) from Newtonmore and 17 miles (27 km) from Kingussie. Dalwhinnie railway station lies on the Highland Main Line from Perth to Inverness.

== Tourism ==
The area is a walking destination along the River Truim and in the Cairngorm and Monadhliath Mountains in the Cairngorm National Park.

Dalwhinnie is on the Sustrans National Cycle Route 7, Glasgow to Inverness. There are several cycle routes in the area including one alongside Loch Ericht.

Loch Ericht Hotel stands on the banks of the River Truim.

== Distillery ==
Diageo owns the local distillery, the highest-elevation working distillery in Scotland. The Dalwhinnie Single Malt is a light, heathery whisky.

== Climate ==
Dalwhinnie experiences a subpolar oceanic climate (Cfc) that very closely borders a humid continental climate (Dfb) with strong influences of an oceanic climate (Cfb), a climate very rare for a UK town.

Skies are frequently overcast with cool temperatures and rainfall throughout the year. Sunshine here averages only 1,091 hours, which is one of the lowest in the United Kingdom.

Dalwhinnie holds the UK low temperature records for the months of June, September and October. In addition, it also holds Scotland's record for the lowest April daytime maximum temperature of −1.0 °C (30.2 °F) in 1975, and the record lowest October temperature for the United Kingdom of −11.7 °C (10.9 °F).

For the 1951–1980 observation period, it averaged a temperature of 6.3 °C (43.3 °F) compared to Braemar's 6.4 °C (43.5 °F), making Dalwhinnie one of the coldest inhabited places in the British Isles.

According to the 1991–2020 observation period, Dalwhinnie is the coldest place in the UK below 500 metres above sea level, with a mean temperature of 6.9 °C (44.4 °F), lower than Braemar which has a mean temperature of 7.1 °C (44.8 °F) for this period.

The lowest temperatures in recent years have been −15.8 °C (3.6 °F) in January 2010 and −16.1 °C (3.0 °F) during December 2010. Winter snowfall can be heavy, with accumulations often exceeding 30 cm (12 in).

Climate data for Dalwhinnie No 2 (351m elevation) 1991–2020
Month	Jan	Feb	Mar	Apr	May	Jun	Jul	Aug	Sep	Oct	Nov	Dec	Year
Record high °C (°F)	11.9 (53.4)	13.4 (56.1)	19.3 (66.7)	23.5 (74.3)	25.1 (77.2)	30.0 (86.0)	29.7 (85.5)	28.7 (83.7)	27.2 (81.0)	18.9 (66.0)	14.9 (58.8)	12.4 (54.3)	30.0 (86.0)
Mean daily maximum °C (°F)	4.6 (40.3)	4.9 (40.8)	6.7 (44.1)	9.8 (49.6)	13.3 (55.9)	15.4 (59.7)	17.1 (62.8)	16.6 (61.9)	14.3 (57.7)	10.5 (50.9)	7.1 (44.8)	4.9 (40.8)	10.4 (50.7)
Daily mean °C (°F)	1.8 (35.2)	1.9 (35.4)	3.4 (38.1)	5.7 (42.3)	8.5 (47.3)	11.2 (52.2)	13.0 (55.4)	12.6 (54.7)	10.6 (51.1)	7.3 (45.1)	4.2 (39.6)	1.9 (35.4)	6.9 (44.4)
Mean daily minimum °C (°F)	−1.0 (30.2)	−1.0 (30.2)	0.0 (32.0)	1.7 (35.1)	3.8 (38.8)	7.0 (44.6)	9.0 (48.2)	8.7 (47.7)	6.9 (44.4)	4.1 (39.4)	1.4 (34.5)	−1.2 (29.8)	3.3 (37.9)
Record low °C (°F)	−19.1 (−2.4)	−16.0 (3.2)	−19.1 (−2.4)	−10.9 (12.4)	−6.5 (20.3)	−2.4 (27.7)	−1.1 (30.0)	−1.3 (29.7)	−6.1 (21.0)	−7.7 (18.1)	−13.5 (7.7)	−17.6 (0.3)	−19.1 (−2.4)
Average precipitation mm (inches)	170.7 (6.72)	119.6 (4.71)	106.3 (4.19)	69.3 (2.73)	75.6 (2.98)	68.9 (2.71)	73.4 (2.89)	84.9 (3.34)	89.4 (3.52)	136.1 (5.36)	142.8 (5.62)	145.5 (5.73)	1,282.4 (50.49)
Average precipitation days (≥ 1.0 mm)	17.8	16.2	15.7	13.7	13.3	13.2	14.1	14.5	14.0	17.9	18.1	17.2	185.8
Mean monthly sunshine hours	25.7	58.4	92.2	136.0	170.6	132.5	133.6	123.4	102.7	66.3	32.9	16.8	1,091
Source 1: Met Office
Source 2: Starlings Roost Weather

== See also ==
- Centre points of the United Kingdom
- Battle of Invernahavon - the remnants of a party of Clan Cameron raiders escaped via Dalwhinnie after their defeat by the Chattan Confederation south west of Newtonmore in this 14th century battle.
