= Pass of Drumochter =

Mountain pass in Highland, Scotland

Coordinates: 56.85964°N 4.24856°W

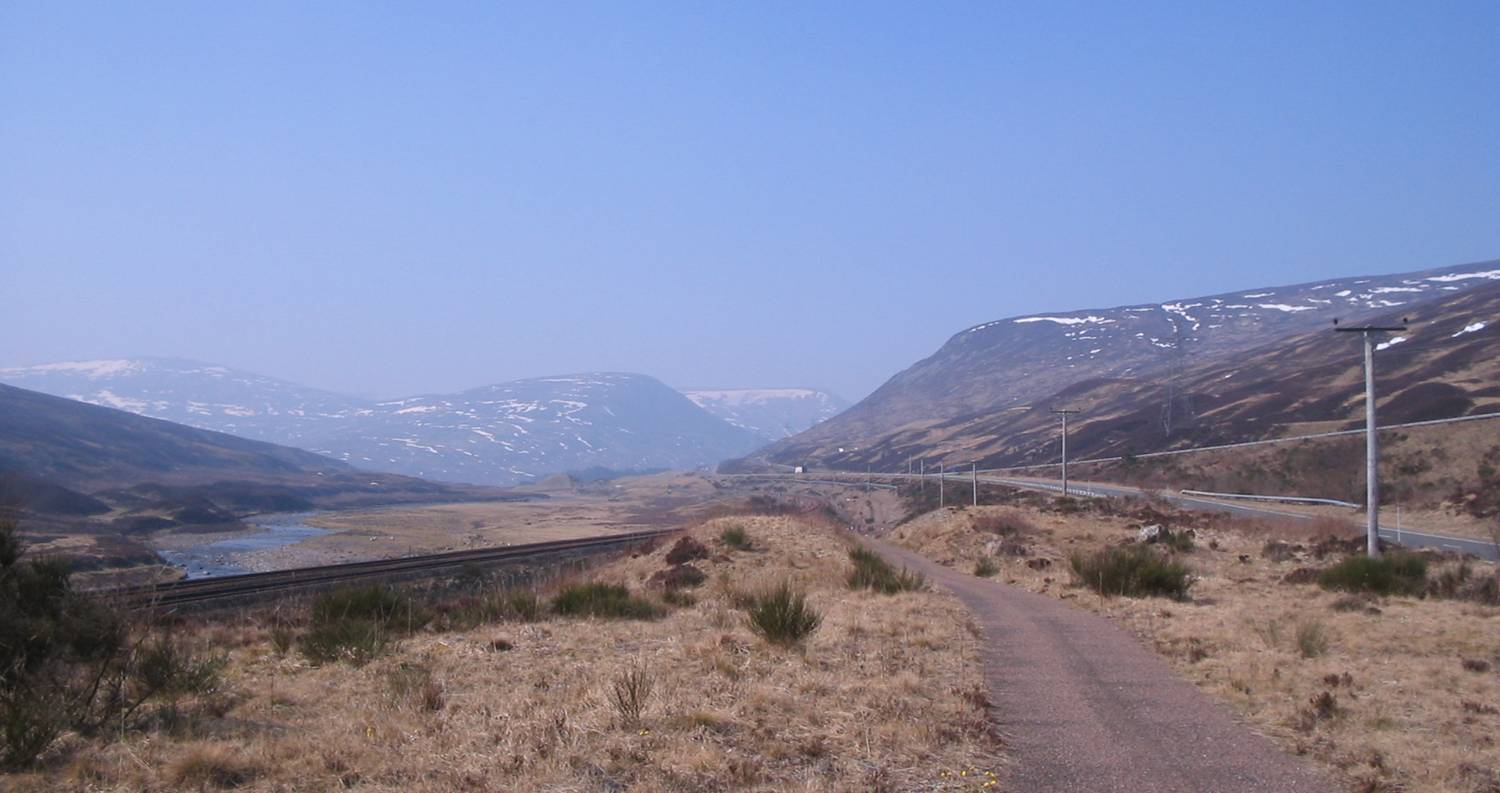
Pass of Drumochter from the south. March 2007

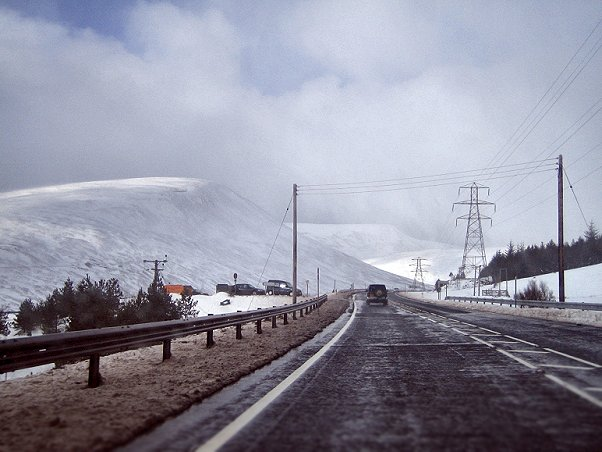
Image of the road in winter. February 2005

The Pass of Drumochter (Scottish Gaelic: Druim Uachdair) meaning simply 'high ridge' is the main mountain pass between the northern and southern central Scottish Highlands. The A9 road passes through here, as does the Highland Main Line, the railway between Inverness and the south of Scotland. The Sustrans National Cycle Route 7 between Glasgow and Inverness also runs through the pass.

The pass is the only gap in the main Grampian Watershed suitable for road traffic routes for almost 100 km, between Glen Coe (west) and Cairnwell Pass (east); the West Highland Railway is the only other crossing, at Corrour. The pass is a natural low point, where the headwaters of the Spey and Tay penetrate most deeply into the broad Gaick Plateau, with the River Garry flowing south, and the River Truim north. The gap has been shaped into a "U" convenient for a transport corridor by glacial action over successive ice ages, although Loch Ericht just to the west is a much larger glacial breach.

The route through the pass has been used since prehistoric times. A military road built between 1728 and 1730 by General Wade came through here.

It is the high point on the A9, at 460 m (1508 ft), and in winter can be subject to severe weather conditions. There are routine winter patrols from November to March, and the road is occasionally closed with snow gates near Dalwhinnie and Dalnacardoch. The summit of the railway line is 452 m (1480 ft), making it the highest in the UK. It has been used by the RAF as a training route for low level flying, now less frequently.

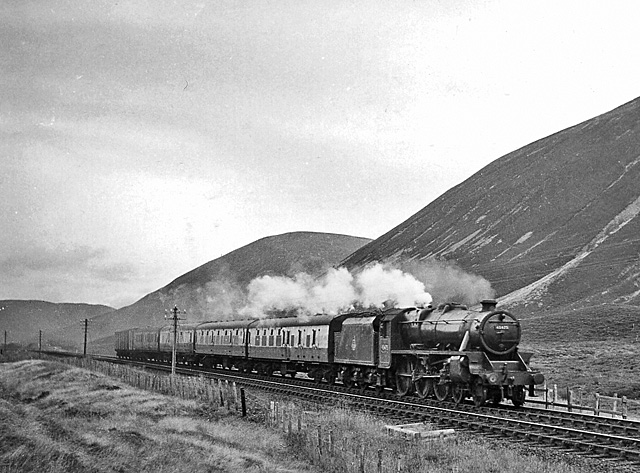
Train near Drumochter Summit in 1957

It is isolated, and the nearest settlement of any size is the small village of Dalwhinnie, some 10 km (6 mi) to the north.

The summit of the pass marks the boundary between Perth and Kinross and the Highland Council area. A sign at this point says "Welcome to the Highlands/Fàilte don Ghàidhealtachd", although this is the boundary for the authority rather than for the Scottish Highlands which extend south to the geological Highland Boundary Fault at Dunkeld.
