= Ben Alder =

Mountain in Scotland

Coordinates: 56.81331°N 4.46533°W

- Beinn Eallair
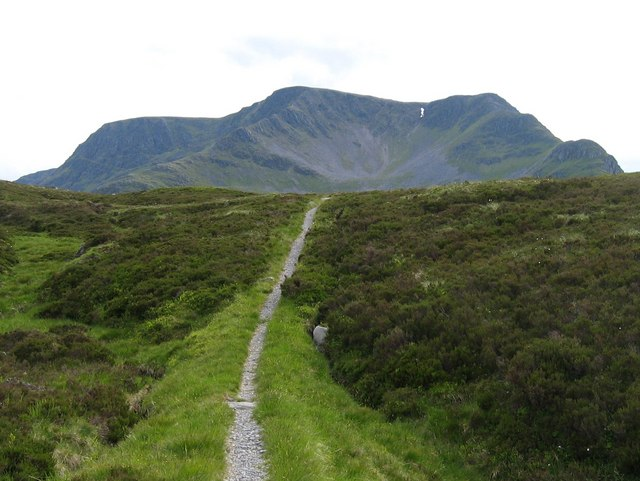

Highest point
- Elevation: 1,148 m (3,766 ft)
- Prominence: 783 m (2,569 ft)Ranked 40th in British Isles
- Listing: Munro, Marilyn

Naming
- Pronunciation: Scottish Gaelic: [peɲ ˈjal̪ˠɪɾʲ]

Geography
- Location: Highlands, Scotland
- Parent range: Grampian Mountains
- OS grid: NN496718

Ben Alder (Scottish Gaelic: Beinn Eallair) is the highest mountain in the remote area of the Scottish Highlands between Loch Ericht and Glen Spean. It rises to 1,148 metres (3,766 ft), making it the 25th highest Munro. The vast summit plateau is home of one of Britain's highest bodies of standing water, Lochan a' Garbh Coire. Ben Alder's north-east corrie exposes a narrow band of metamorphosed Kinlochlaggan Limestone alongside a dark epidiorite sill, forming a small pale cliff and a run of ledges, runnels and sinkholes around 1,030 m. The contrast between calcium-rich "sugar" limestone and the igneous rock, set within surrounding schists and quartzites, creates a tight mosaic of substrates and microhabitats. This outcrop supports one of Britain's richest montane limestone lichen floras, with more than 100 species, including many nationally rare species, recorded in roughly a hectare, and is regarded as second only to Ben Lawers.

== Climbing ==
Sitting 19 km from Dalwhinnie and 15 km from Corrour railway station, it is commonly climbed in a two-day expedition, usually taking in its lower neighbour, Beinn Bheoil. There are two bothies near the mountain: Culra Lodge (closed due to asbestos contamination) to the northeast and Ben Alder Cottage to the south, both potentially providing shelter for walkers in the area. Ben Alder Cottage is reputed to be haunted by the ghost of a ghillie who hanged himself from the rafters.

== Geology and landforms ==
Ben Alder's high ground includes a very narrow band of the Kinlochlaggan Limestone, part of the pre-Cambrian Dalradian sequence, which runs for about 21 km north of the mountain. Where the band crosses a shoulder of Aonach Beag it forms a steep, pale buttress at roughly 1,030 m on the north-east-facing wall of a corrie. The visible rib is only about 80 m high and 30 m wide; below the cliffs its line is picked out by sinkholes, while above it continues for about 50 m as a tor-like mass before disappearing under solifluction debris on the summit plateau. The limestone here is strongly metamorphosed, giving the coarse "sugar-limestone" texture familiar to field botanists.

On the north side of this rib is a dark, sub-vertical sill of epidiorite about 10 m wide, an altered calc-alkaline igneous rock. Together the two units pass laterally into the acid schists and quartzites that form most of the surrounding hills, with the limestone occupying the core of a synclinal fold. Although the cliff is steep it is crossed by numerous ledges and runnels, adding fine-scale variety to the terrain. The juxtaposition of weakly dolomitised limestone—weathering to calcium- and magnesium-rich soils—and chemically complex epidiorite is considered to create a broad range of substrates and microhabitats that help explain the site's unusual richness.

== Lichen flora ==
A small crag of limestone with a strip of epidiorite on Ben Alder, at about 1,030 m, carries an unusually rich lichen flora. The mix of rock types, together with the area's cool, very wet, ocean-influenced mountain climate, creates many different small habitats for lichens. The limestone, altered by heat and pressure, tends to form soils rich in calcium and magnesium, while the epidiorite breaks down to a different set of minerals; taken together this broadens the range of "base-loving" niches that lichens can occupy. A survey of the main outcrop found 106 species, 44 of which were classed as rare in Britain, and the site is judged second in national importance only to Ben Lawers. The richest ground is only about a hectare in extent, which likely concentrates a variety of niches in a very small area.

Species of exceptional national interest are part of this flora. Seven lichens were then known in Britain only from Ben Alder—Buellia (undescribed at the time), Fulgensia bracteata, Lecania alpivaga, Polyblastia helvetica, Sagiolechia protuberans, Solorina bispora var. monospora, and Trimmatothele aff. perquisita. The outcrop's moisture-retentive limestone and mainly north-east aspect favour extensive, long-lived bryophyte cushions, with which many of the scarcest lichens are associated; the spread of loose calcite "sand" across ledges may provide an intermediate level of disturbance that sustains high diversity. All four British species of Solorina and most terricolous (land-dwelling) Pertusaria occur together here—an unusual co-occurrence in Britain. The adjoining epidiorite supports a specialised but sparse assemblage characteristic of high Scottish mountains, and the site has also yielded noteworthy lichenicolous fungi, including Pleospora hookeri (otherwise known from Ben Lawers and Ingleton) and Metasphaeria stereocaulorum, the latter then new to the British Isles. A smaller limestone outcrop 1.5 km to the south-west proved comparatively poor and lacked the typical Fulgensia/Catapyrenium community seen on the main cliff, demonstrating how local microhabitat and bryophyte cover shape the flora.

== The "Man with no Name" ==
A man's body was found near the top of Ben Alder in June 1996, at the edge of a cliff face, overlooking a lochan, his heart pierced by an old-fashioned lead ball bullet. All the labels had been cut from his clothing. Forms of identification such as credit cards were missing. He had a replica Remington .44, unsuitable slip-on shoes, three 1.5-litre bottles of water in his rucksack and £21 in cash.

Although the police later ascertained that his clothing came mostly from French supermarkets, it was not until November 1997, following a cranio-facial reconstruction of the dead man's face, that a friend of the family wondered if the man might be Emmanuel Caillet, from south Paris, France. Last seen by his parents on 14 August 1995, it was established that Emmanuel had crossed the Channel the next day. He then sold his car for £350, less than its value. Two days later he stayed one night in the Stakis-Ingram Hotel, Glasgow, paying with his Visa card. His identity was duly confirmed.

There were suggestions he might have been murdered because a witness claimed that he had been with another man at Corrour railway station, but forensic evidence points to suicide.

== Kidnapped ==
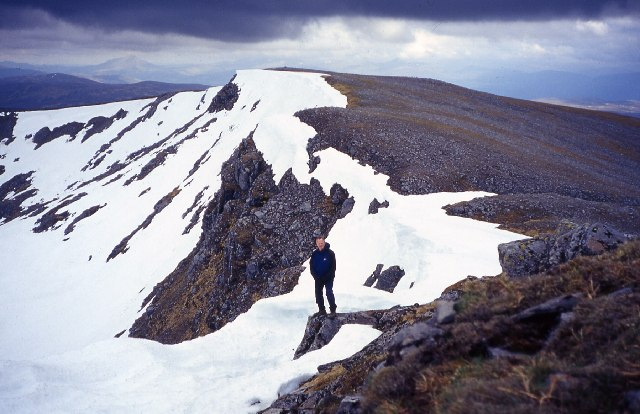
Garbh Choire on Ben Alder, looking south

Ben Alder is one of the locations featured in the novel Kidnapped by Robert Louis Stevenson. The main characters David Balfour and Alan Breck Stewart are hosted by the Scottish clan chief Cluny MacPherson, fugitive after the Second Jacobite Rising, in one of his hiding places at Ben Alder.

The part about Cluny MacPherson is based on a true story. He really did hide out for an astonishing nine years on the slopes of Ben Alder, in a hiding place called 'the Cage', before escaping to France. Prince Charles Edward Stuart briefly joined him there in early September 1746 whilst on the run after the failure of the Forty-Five.

== Geodesy ==
Ben Alder was the origin (meridian) of the 6 inch and 1:2500 Ordnance Survey maps of Inverness-shire.

== See also ==
- List of Munro mountains
- Mountains and hills of Scotland
