= Loch Ericht =

Freshwater loch in the Highlands of Scotland

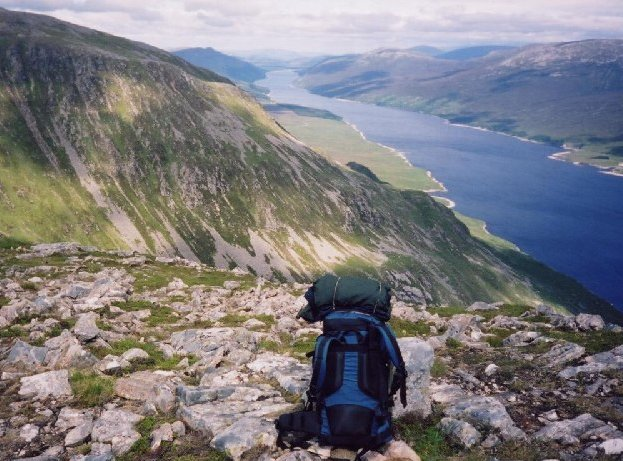
- View from Beinn Bheòil

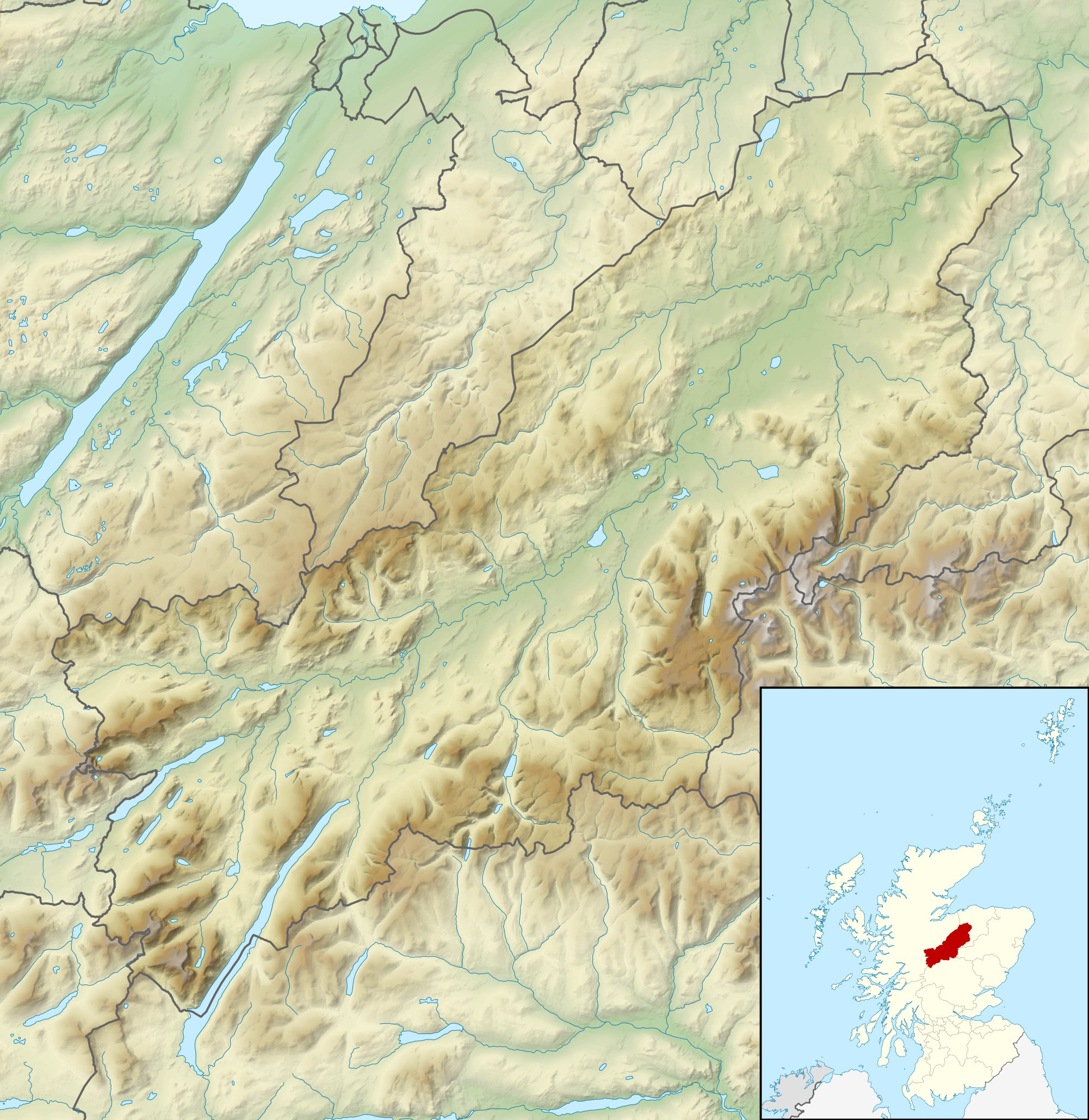
- Location within Badenoch and Strathspey
- Location: grid reference NN542722
- Coordinates: 56°51′N 4°21′W
- Type: freshwater loch
- Max. length: 23.33 km (14.50 mi)
- Max. width: 0.8 km (0.50 mi)
- Surface area: 2,238.5 ha (5,531 acres)
- Average depth: 189 ft (58 m)
- Max. depth: 512 ft (156 m)
- Shore length^{1}: 60 km (37 mi)
- Surface elevation: 356 m (1,168 ft)
- ^{1} Shore length is not a well-defined measure.

Loch Ericht (Scottish Gaelic: Loch Eireachd) is a freshwater loch on the border between the former Perthshire, now Perth and Kinross and the former Inverness-shire, now Highlands Council areas of Scotland. It has a north-east to south-west orientation. The village of Dalwhinnie lies at the north east end of the loch. Loch Ericht is the tenth largest freshwater lake in Scotland and has a good reputation for its trout fishing and Ferox trout.

Loch Ericht occupies a major glacial breach cut through the former main Grampian divide from Ben Nevis over Ben Alder to the Cairngorms. The breach exploits the Loch Ericht Fault, a major feature of the Caledonian Orogeny, parallel to the Great Glen Fault and other NE-SW faults. The preglacial col in the former divide at Beinn Bheoil - Stob an Aonaich Mhoir is estimated by Linton to have been at 650m asl. With the loch bed being at 200m asl, ice has excavated a trench at least 450 m deep. The glacier has carried erratic boulders of Rannoch granite far down the flanks of Strath Spey. A secondary breach was cut between The Fara (Am Faireamh) and Geal Charn (Drumochter) thus beheading the Pattack catchment. The present watershed has been displaced about ten miles north-east to Dalwhinnie.

The loch is part of a hydro-electric scheme and is dammed at both ends. Water flows into the northern end via the Cuaich Aqueduct. The southern end is linked to a hydro-electric power station at Loch Rannoch by a pipeline abstracting most of the flow of the 4-mile (6.4 km) long River Ericht. The low northern barrage is located on the former natural watershed, raising the natural level of the loch slightly. The reservoir volume is 230 million m^{3} of water with a water length of 24.4 kilometres (15.2 mi). The Corrievarkie pumped-storage hydroelectricity project is planned to hold 22 million cubic metres of water in the hills above the lake. If built, it would have a power of 600 MW for 24 hours.

Loch Ericht is surrounded by a number of Munros, including Ben Alder (1,148 metres; 3,766 ft), Geal-Chàrn (1,132 metres; 3,714 ft). and the Drumochter hills on the SE side. Traditional hunting areas border the loch. These are called forests; the chief of which is Ben Alder Forest.

== Mapping ==
Loch Ericht is covered by

- Ordnance Survey Explorer map 393 (1:25000) Ben Alder, Loch Ericht and Loch Laggan (ISBN 9780319239186) and
- Ordnance Survey Landranger map 42 (1:50000) Glen Garry and Loch Rannoch (ISBN 9780319231296).
