= Pubil =

Hamlet in Perth & Kinross, Scotland

Coordinates: 56.545°N 4.499°W

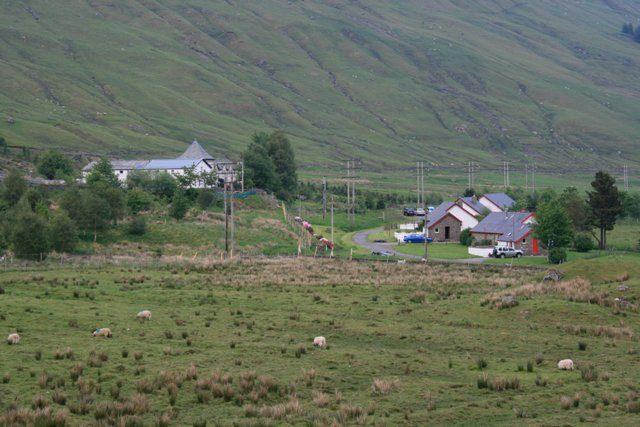
Pubil in 2007, showing Pubil House above the cottages

Pubil is a hamlet in Perth and Kinross, Scotland. It lies to the north of the River Lyon in Glen Lyon, about 1 km (0.62 mi) east of Lubreoch dam which raises the level of Loch Lyon as part of the Breadalbane Hydro-Electric Scheme. It is made up of Pubil House and eight cottages, which were built by the Hydro Board to recompense the Megernie estate for the flooding of a large area when the hydro scheme was developed.

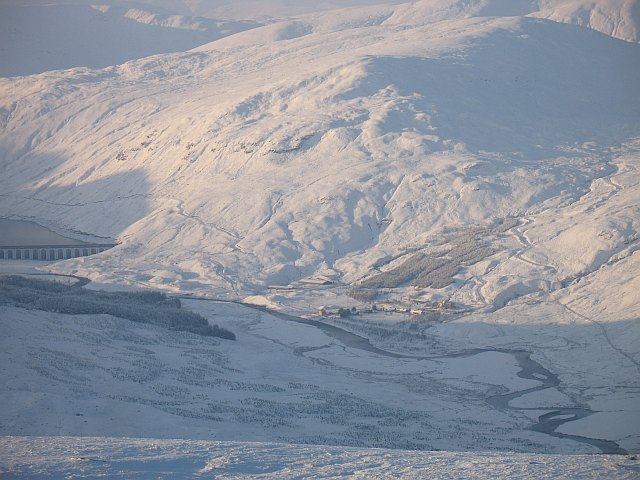
Pubil and the Loch Lyon dam in November 2008

On 20 October 2025 it was the epicentre of an earthquake of magnitude 3.6, which was followed by a series of smaller quakes. The British Geological Survey's Earthquake Information shows that in the 60 days from 22 October to 19 December there were a further 16 earthquakes centred on Pubil, out of a total of 60 earthquakes in and around the United Kingdom.

Angus Macanleister, 7th chief of the Clan Fletcher, lived at Pubil in 1700.

Pubil can be used as a starting point for walks including the ascent of the nearby 796 m (2,612 ft) Meall Phubaill (not to be confused with the 774 m (2,539 ft) Meall a' Phubuill northwest of Fort William). In 2007 competitors in the Lowe Alpine Mountain Marathon overnighted at a temporary campsite at Pubil.

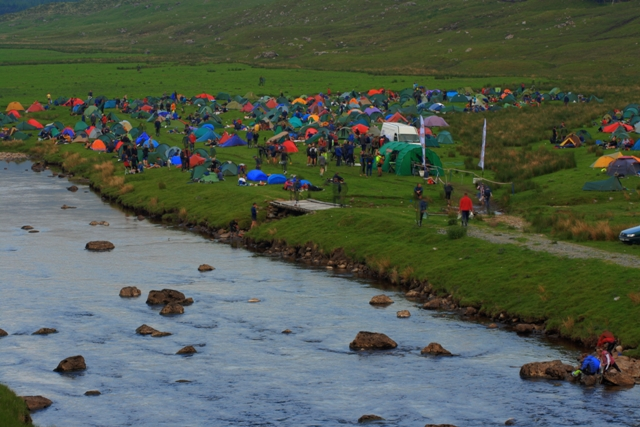
Participants in the 2007 Lowe Alpine Mountain Marathon camping at Pubil
