= Càrn Mairg =

Mountain in the Scottish Highlands

Coordinates: 56.634635°N 4.145608°W

- Càrn na Mairc
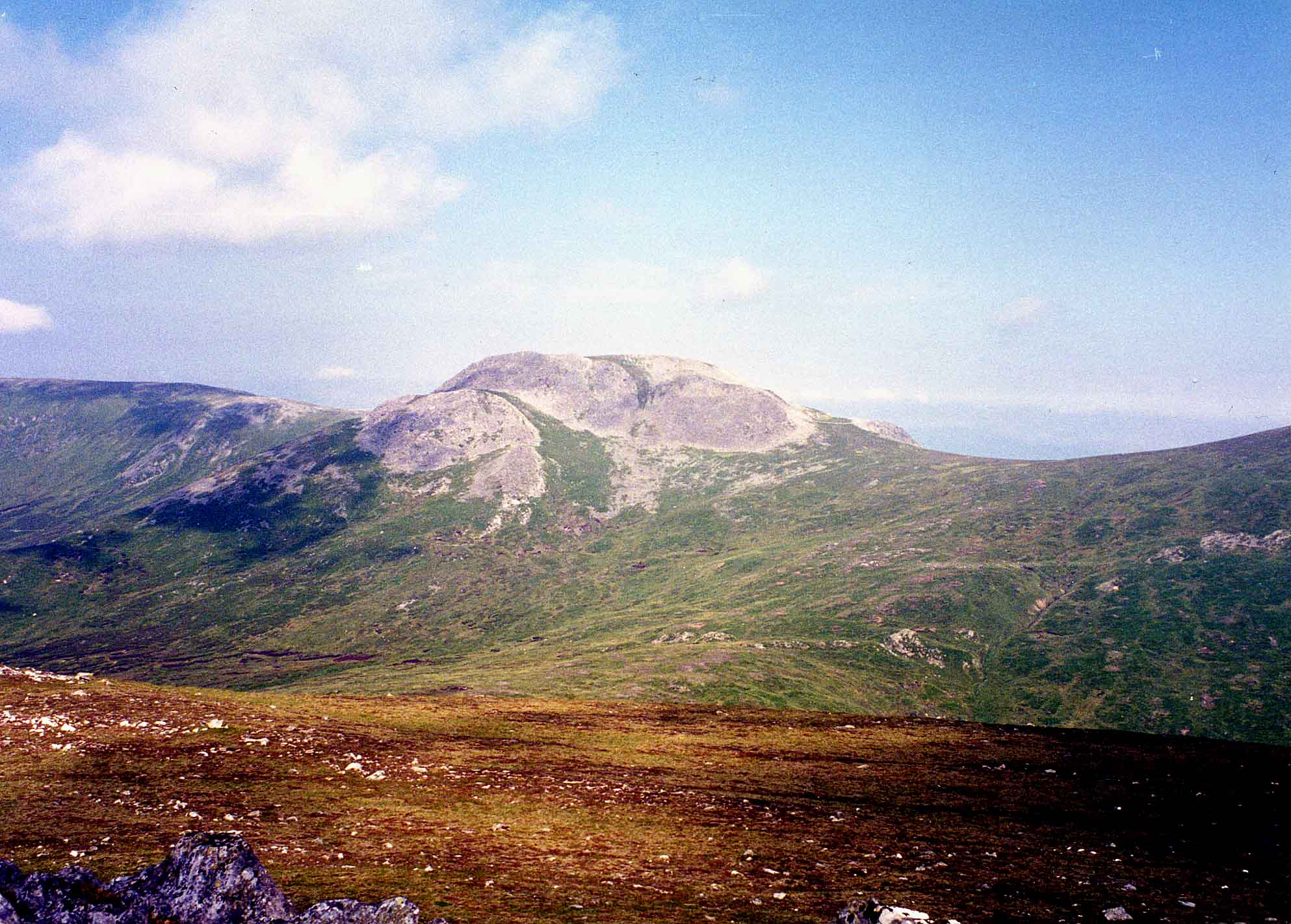
- Càrn Mairg seen from Meall nan Aighean, 2 km SE.

Highest point
- Elevation: 1,042 m (3,419 ft)
- Prominence: 465 m (1,526 ft)
- Parent peak: Schiehallion
- Listing: Munro, Marilyn

Geography
- Location: Perthshire, Scotland
- Parent range: Grampians
- OS grid: NN684512
- Topo map: OS Landranger 51, OS Explorer 378

Listed summits of Càrn Mairg
Name	Grid ref	Height	Status
Meall a’ Bhàrr	NN668515	1004 m (3294 ft)	Munro Top
Meall Liath	NN692512	1012 m (3320 ft)	Munro Top

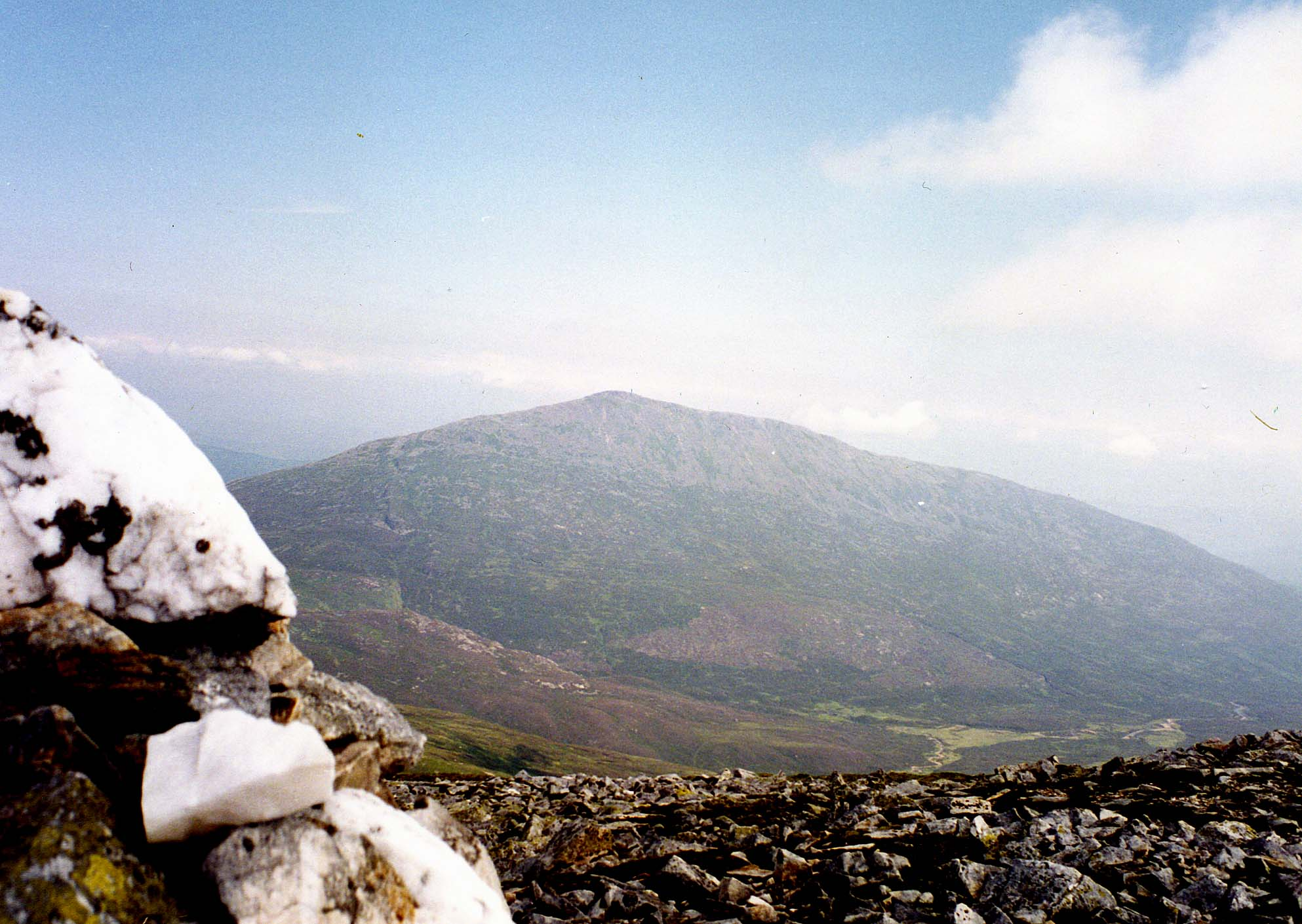
Schiehallion seen from the summit of Càrn Mairg.

Càrn Mairg (Scottish Gaelic: Càrn na Mairc) is a mountain in the Breadalbane region of the Scottish Highlands, with a height of 1,042 metres (3,419 ft). It stands in a group of four Munro mountains known as the 'Càrn Mairg group', on the north side of Glen Lyon, Perthshire.

== Name ==
Ainmean-Àite na h-Alba states that the name Carn Mairg comes from Scottish Gaelic Càrn na Mairc, probably meaning "hill of the horse". Carn Mairg has also been interpreted as meaning "hill of sorrow" or "hill of the dead". This is said to commemorate Saint Eonan turning back an outbreak of bubonic plague at the farmstead of Slatich, several kilometres to the west; the nearby village of Fortingall had earlier been decimated leaving only one survivor. An alternative interpretation of the name is "pudding hill" from the word marag, meaning a "(meat) pudding" which could describe the hill's uninspiring shape.

== Landscape ==
Càrn Mairg is the high point on an east-west ridge which connects to the adjoining Munro of Meall Garbh which lies 3.5 km to the west. This broad ridge continues easterly for almost 10 km descending into Glen Lyon at the village of Keltneyburn and also contains two subsidiary tops of Càrn Mairg which are both listed as “Tops” in the Munro Tables. These are Meall a’ Bhàrr (1004 metres) which lies just over a kilometre to the west with a summit which stands on a rocky outcrop. Meall Liath (Grey Hill) has a height of 1012 metres and lies just under a kilometre to the east across a col with an approximate height of 955 metres, there are grouse butts just north of Meall Liath's summit.

The summit of Càrn Mairg is steep sided, partly craggy and is made up of greyish quartzite stones. South west of the summit are steep slopes which fall to the head of Coire Chearcaill which is drained by the Allt Coire a' Chearcaill, a tributary of the Invervar Burn and contains an old stalkers bothy on its lower north bank. The northern slopes fall to the glen containing Loch Rannoch and Loch Tummel while to the north east is Gleann Mòr which separates the mountain from Schiehallion which is four km distant. All drainage from the mountain feeds the River Tay either going north and then via the River Tummel or south and via the River Lyon.

== Chesthill Estate ==
Càrn Mairg stands on the Chesthill Estate, whose main activities are farming, fishing and deer stalking. Prior to the Land Reform (Scotland) Act 2003 there was some animosity between the estate and hill walkers over access to the Càrn Mairg hills. At one point the estate put a 3.5-metre-high (11 ft) locked gate at the start of the walk at Invervar. Since the 2003 legislation, the estate has built a car park for walkers at Invervar which only holds eight cars and they request that walkers go elsewhere when the car park is full in an effort to keep a limited number of walkers on the hills. The estate have also requested that the round of the Càrn Mairg Munros is done from west to east (clockwise) to lessen disturbance to deer management.

== Climbing ==
Càrn Mairg is commonly climbed with the other three Munros of the Càrn Mairg group (Meall Garbh, Meall nan Aighean and Càrn Gorm), a route commonly termed the Glen Lyon horseshoe. With a summit elevation of 1,041 metres (3,415 feet), it is the highest of the group and qualifies as a Munro and a Marilyn. The terrain of the Càrn Mairg range is similar to high, rolling moorland with only small depressions between the four Munros, a landscape which is suitable for ski mountaineering and has been likened to the Cairngorms, however the circuit of the hills is a long walk being almost 18 km in length.

Càrn Mairg is usually climbed from Invervar (grid reference NN665482) in Glen Lyon as part of the circuit of the four Carn Mairg group Munros. For many years parking was a problem on the narrow road but the car park built by the Chesthill estate has eased this difficulty. The clockwise circuit follows the Invervar Burn for just over a kilometre until the forest is left behind, then the first Munro of Càrn Gorm can be climbed by going west; the route then goes to Meall Garbh before reaching Càrn Mairg. Navigation throughout the walk is aided by a dilapidated line of old rusting fence posts which follow the ridge. A direct ascent is possible from Fortingall (grid reference NN738470) up Gleann Muilinn but this is a round trip of around 20 km. The summit is marked by a large cairn of quartzite boulders and gives a fine view of Schiehallion to the NE (see picture).
