= Bridge of Balgie =

Hamlet in Glen Lyon, Perth and Kinross, Scotland

Coordinates: 56°35′29″N 4°19′09″W

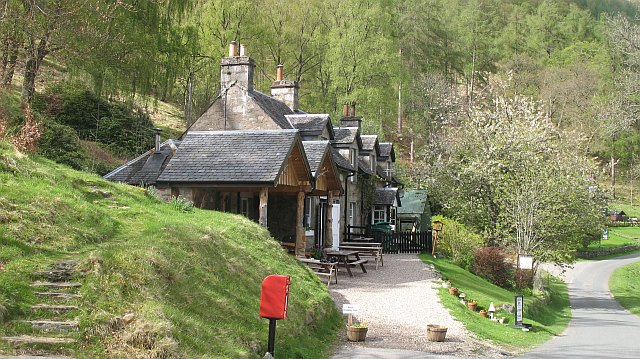
Bridge of Balgie post office

Bridge of Balgie is a hamlet in Glen Lyon (Perth & Kinross, Scotland) and lies at the junction between the east–west single track road along the foot of the glen from Fortingall to Loch Lyon and the unclassified mountain road running over the western shoulder of Ben Lawers to the A827 near Milton Morenish on the shores of Loch Tay. Although it only comprises a few dwellings, it is the principal settlement in the central section of Glen Lyon and contains a combined post office and tea room which is popular with walkers and other visitors.

Opposite the hamlet, on the south shore of the river Lyon, is the Meggernie Outdoor Centre which is run by the Scout Association. Half a mile to the east, along the road towards Fortingall, is the small settlement of Innerwick which contains the Glen Lyon war memorial and is the end point for a well used hiking trail to Loch Rannoch.
