= Càrn Gorm =

Mountain in Perth and Kinross, Scotland

Coordinates: 56.6221°N 4.2253°W

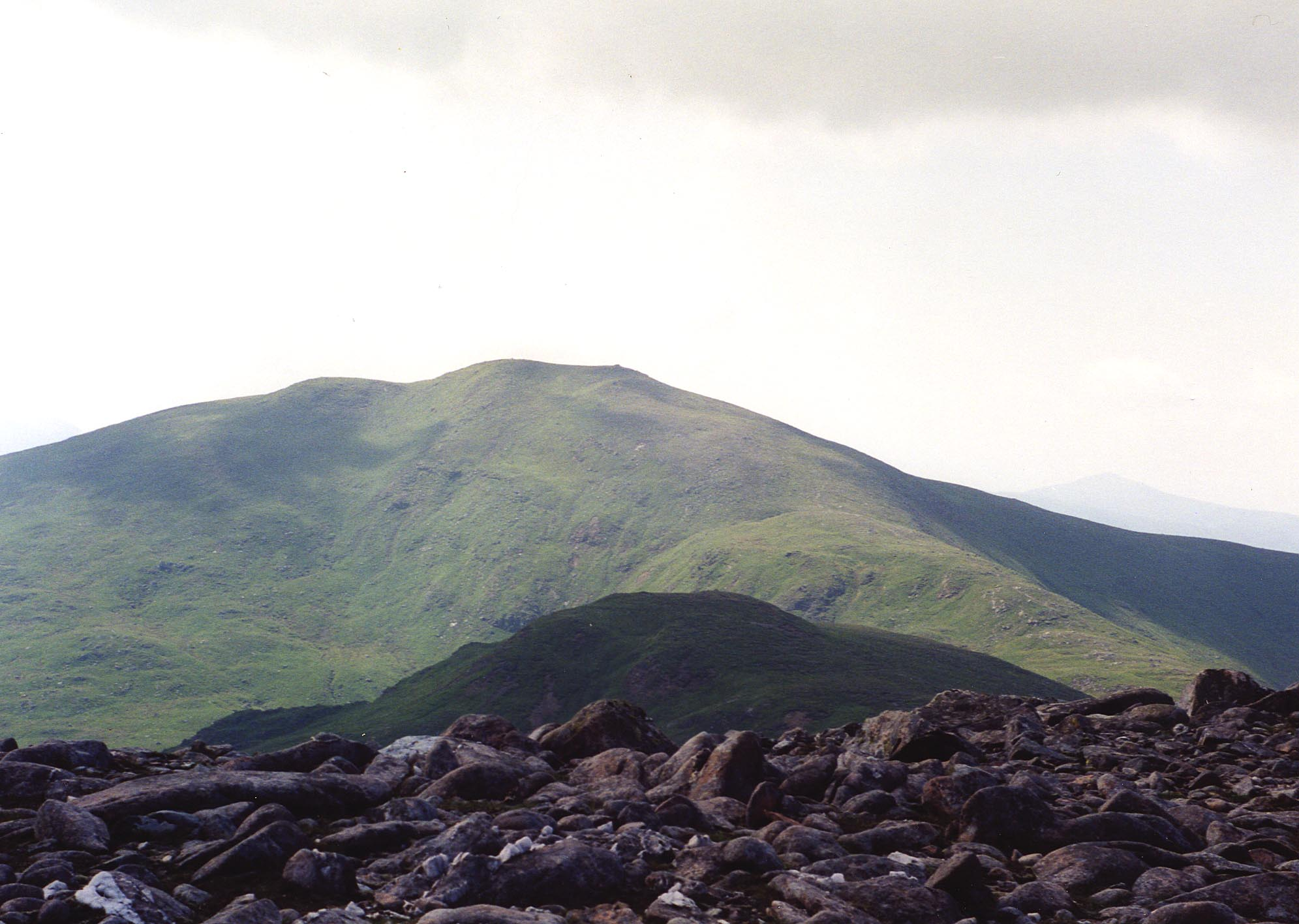
- Càrn Gorm seen from Meall Garbh, 2 km NE. The Munro “Top” of An Sgorr is in the foreground.

Highest point
- Elevation: 1,029 m (3,376 ft)
- Prominence: 182 m (597 ft)
- Parent peak: Càrn Mairg
- Listing: Munro, Marilyn

Naming
- English translation: blue hill
- Language of name: Gaelic
- Pronunciation: Scottish Gaelic: [ˈkʰaːrˠn ˈkɔɾɔm]

Geography
- Location: Perthshire, Scotland
- Parent range: Grampians
- OS grid: NN635500
- Topo map: OS Landranger 51, OS Explorer 378

Listed summits of Càrn Gorm
Name	Grid ref	Height	Status
An Sgorr	NN640509	924 m (3031 ft)	Munro Top

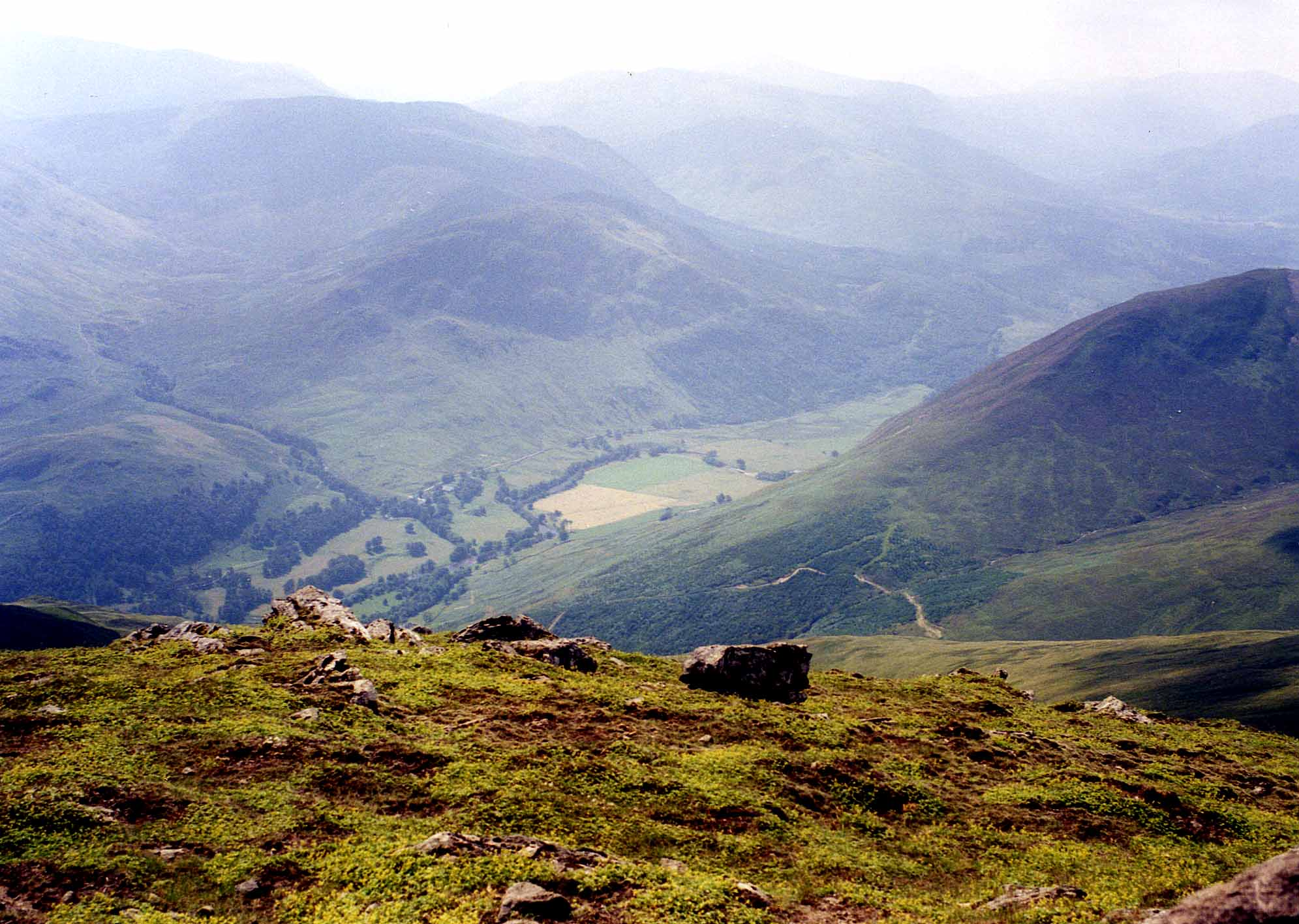
Looking down into Glen Lyon from the summit of Carn Gorm.

Càrn Gorm is a mountain in the Breadalbane region of the Scottish Highlands, with a height of 1,029 metres (3,376 ft). It stands in a group of four Munro mountains known as the Càrn Mairg group or the Glen Lyon Horseshoe, on the north side of Glen Lyon, Perthshire.

== Overview ==
Càrn Gorm reaches a height of 1029 metres (3376 feet), it qualifies as a Munro and a Marilyn. It is often climbed as part of the circuit of the Càrn Mairg Munros which stand in a curving arc around the Invervar Burn. Càrn Gorm is the first of the hills climbed when the round is walked in a clockwise direction, it is then followed by Meall Garbh, Càrn Mairg and Meall nan Aighean. Although not the highest of the group Càrn Gorm is often regarded as the finest looking with its summit shaped into a neat cone. The hill lies within the Chesthill estate, and large herds of deer are often seen on its slopes. Càrn Gorm translates literally from the Gaelic as "blue hill", but the word gorm is also used for the green of foliage, and probably comes from the dark tones of the grass on the hillside rather than the shady hues of the conifer plantation on its south east slopes which was planted well after the hill was named.

== Geography ==
Càrn Gorm is mostly composed of grassy slopes with sporadic rocky outcrops, its attractive summit peak is formed by the meeting of four ridges of varying lengths. The NW ridge is the longest, running for eight km down to the shores of Loch Rannoch its lower slopes are clothed in the woodlands of the Carie and Cragganester Woods SSSI part of the ancient Black Wood of Rannoch. The SE ridge descends to the glen of the Invervar Burn and is planted with coniferous woodland on its lower slopes. This eastern side of the mountain is part of the Càrn Gorm and Meall Garbh SSSI, a 1930 hectare area of sub-alpine mountain habitat, an example of natural and undisturbed territory within the UK with rare plant species. Lower down by the Invervar Burn are the remains of some old shielings from the time when cattle were brought up to summer pasture on these hills.

Càrn Gorm's south ridge is short and steep with some crags and is best shunned as a walking route, it descends quickly to Glen Lyon near Camusvrachan. The north ridge is more significant connecting the mountain to the adjoining Munro of Meall Garbh, firstly going over the subsidiary top of An Sgorr (The Rocky Peak). With a height of 924 metres An Sgorr is listed in the Munro Tables as a “Top” of Càrn Gorm. On the traverse between the two Munros, An Sgorr can be by-passed on its NW side, but most walkers will climb it and then drop to the col with a height of 845 metres before climbing to Meall Garbh. In between the ridges there are steep slopes, especially to the east, north and SW. All drainage from Càrn Gorm feeds the River Tay with the majority going south via Glen Lyon although a small percentage goes north via Loch Rannoch.

== Ascents and summit ==
As mentioned, Càrn Gorm is invariably climbed as the first peak of the Glen Lyon horseshoe, the start is at Invervar in Glen Lyon (grid reference NN665482) where there is a small car park. The route goes north through the woodland for just over a kilometre until the open hillside is reached, the hill can then be climbed by its SE ridge. As an alternative to the Glen Lyon horseshoe walk, Càrn Gorm can climbed with the adjoining corbett of Beinn Dearg, which lies 2.5 km to the west across the steep sided Dubh Choirein starting at Camusvrachen (grid reference NN619478) at the foot of that glen. The summit has two high points, the true summit is marked by a small cairn while 80 metres to the NW is the site of the OS trig point which has been pushed over and is lying on its side, surrounded by a wind shelter. The best views from the summit are to the south, there being an aerial view of Glen Lyon and a good spectacle of the Ben Lawers range.
