= Càrn na Marbh =

Bronze Age tumulus

Coordinates: 56°35′50″N 4°03′10″W

Interactive map of Càrn na Marbh

Càrn na Marbh (meaning "mound" or "cairn of the dead") is a re-used Bronze Age tumulus, located in Fortingall in Perthshire, Scotland. The mound was used in the 14th century for burying victims of the plague away from the church graveyard. A stone, known as Clach a' Phlàigh, "the Plague Stone" crowns the mound and may be an original standing stone and commemorates the plague victims who were buried here in the 14th century. A tablet on the stone is inscribed with the words:

“Here lie the victims of the Great Plague of the 14th Century, taken here on a sledge drawn by a white horse led by an old woman.”

Local legend says it was the focal point of an ancient Samhain (Halloween) festival. A great fire or Samhnag was lit on top of it each year. The whole community took hands when it was blazing and danced round the mound both sunwise and anti-sunwise. As the fire began to wane, some of the younger boys took burning embers from the flames and ran throughout the field with them, finally throwing them into the air and dancing over them as they lay glowing on the ground. When the last embers were showing, the boys would have a leaping competition across the remains of the fire, reminiscent of the Beltane festival. When it was finished, the young people went home and ducked for apples and practised divination. There was no Scottish tradition of 'guising', the bonfire being the absolute centre of attention until it was consumed. The Samhain celebrations here apparently came to an end in 1924.

The mound of ‘Càrn na Marbh’ is located in the same village as the Fortingall Yew, and the general area is famed for its Bronze Age burial mounds, and preserved standing stones. The site was Christianised during the Dark Ages, perhaps because it was already a sacred place. Place-name and archaeological evidence hint at an Iron Age cult centre at Fortingall which may have had this ancient tree as its focus.
