= Churchyard =

Land adjoining or surrounding a church

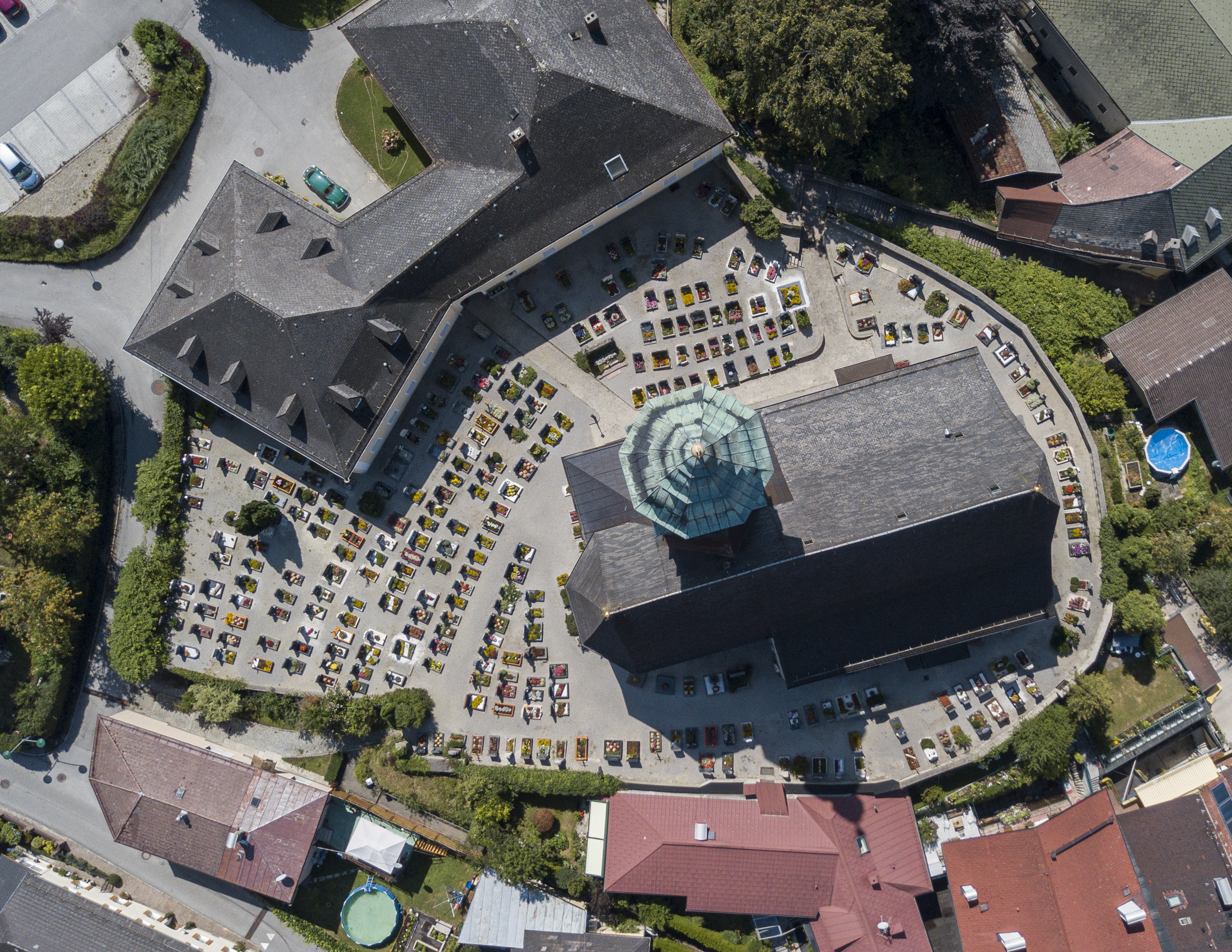
The churchyard of Straßwalchen, Austria

In Christian countries, a churchyard is a patch of land adjoining or surrounding a church, which is usually owned by the relevant church or local parish itself. In the Scots language and in both Scottish English and Ulster Scots, this can also be known as a kirkyard.

While churchyards can be any patch of land on church grounds, historically, they were often used as graveyards (burial places).

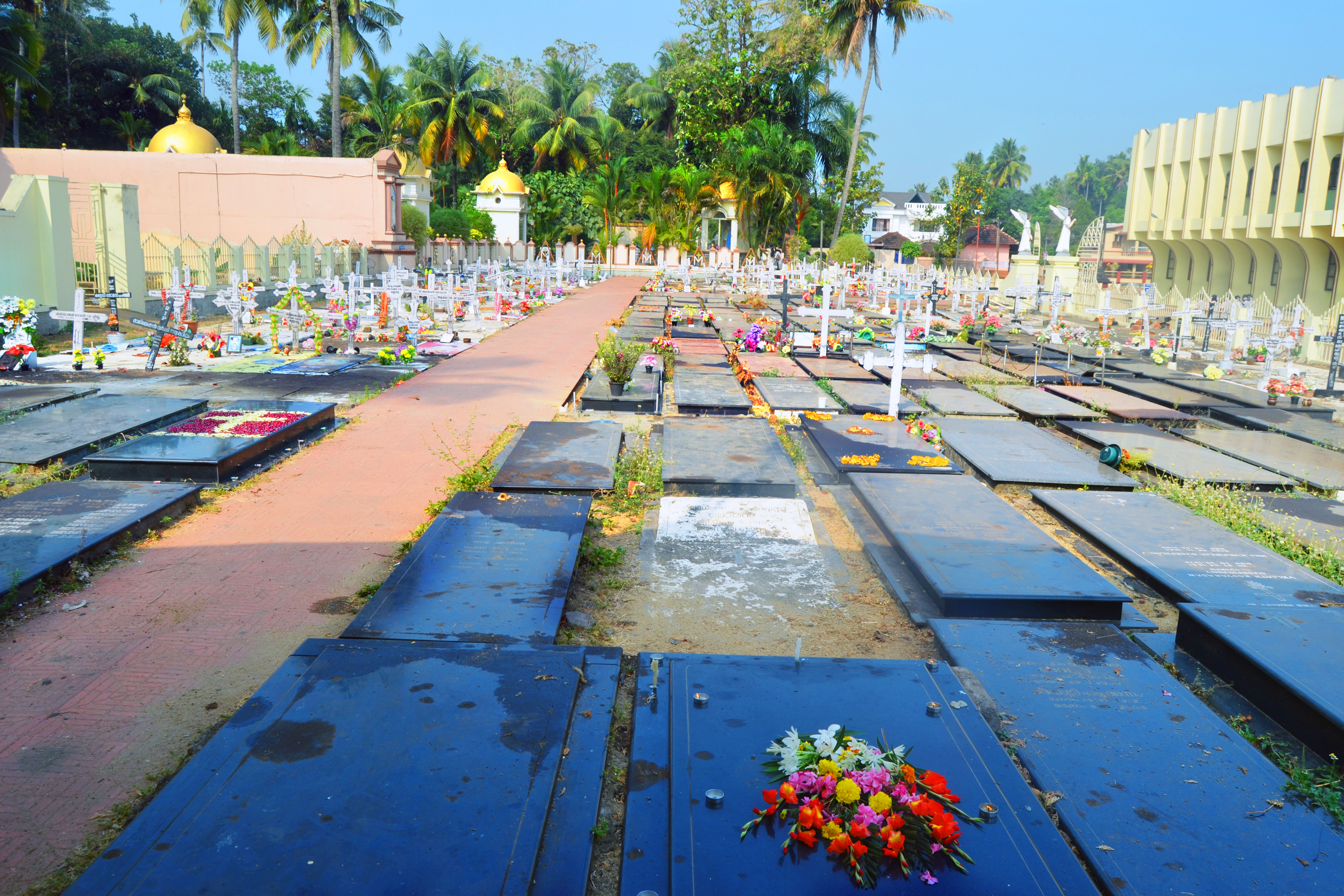
Churchyard adjacent to St. Mary's Forane Church, Koratty, India.

== Use of churchyards as a place of burial ==
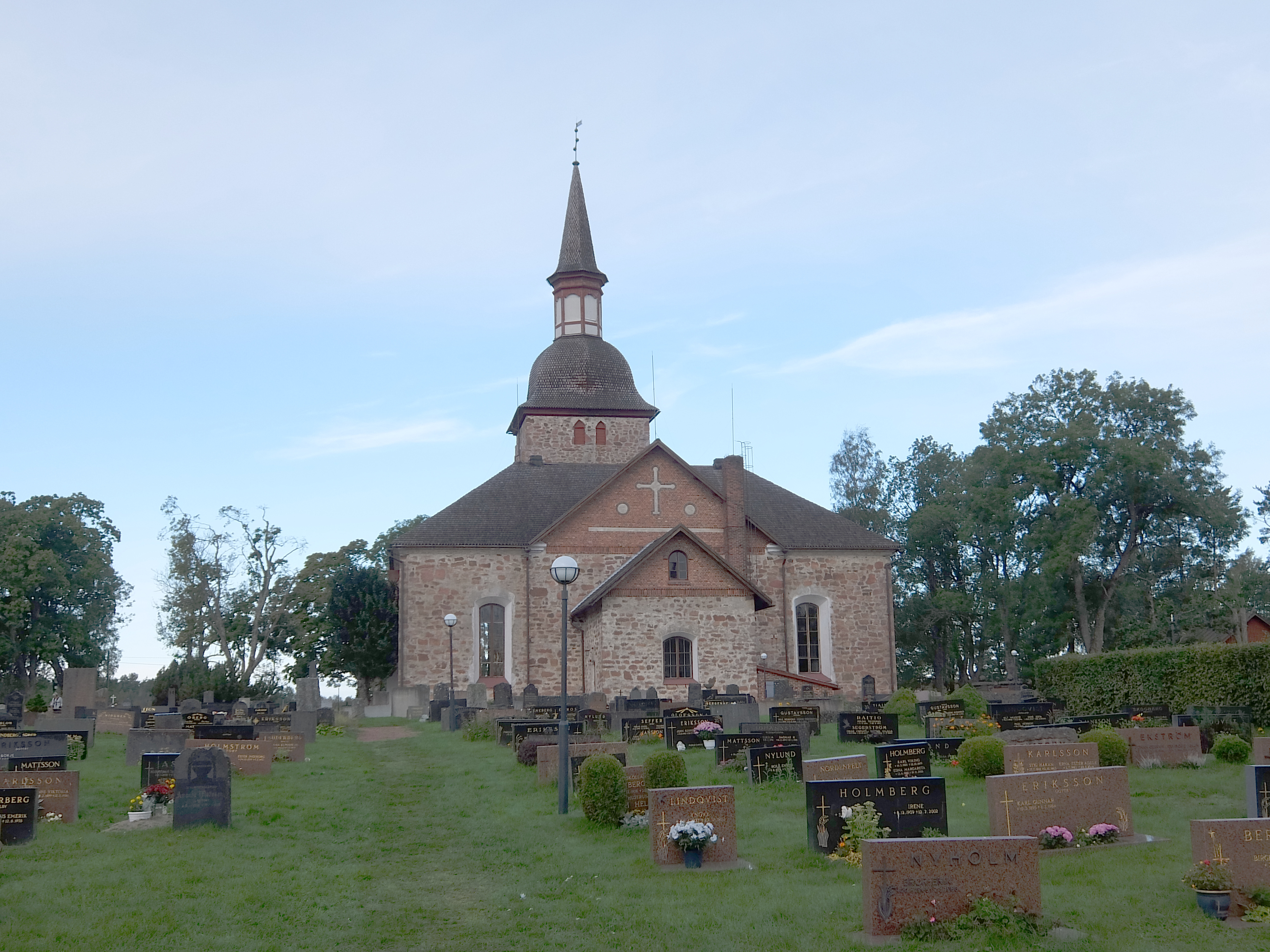
Lutheran St. Olaf's Church and churchyard in Jomala, Åland

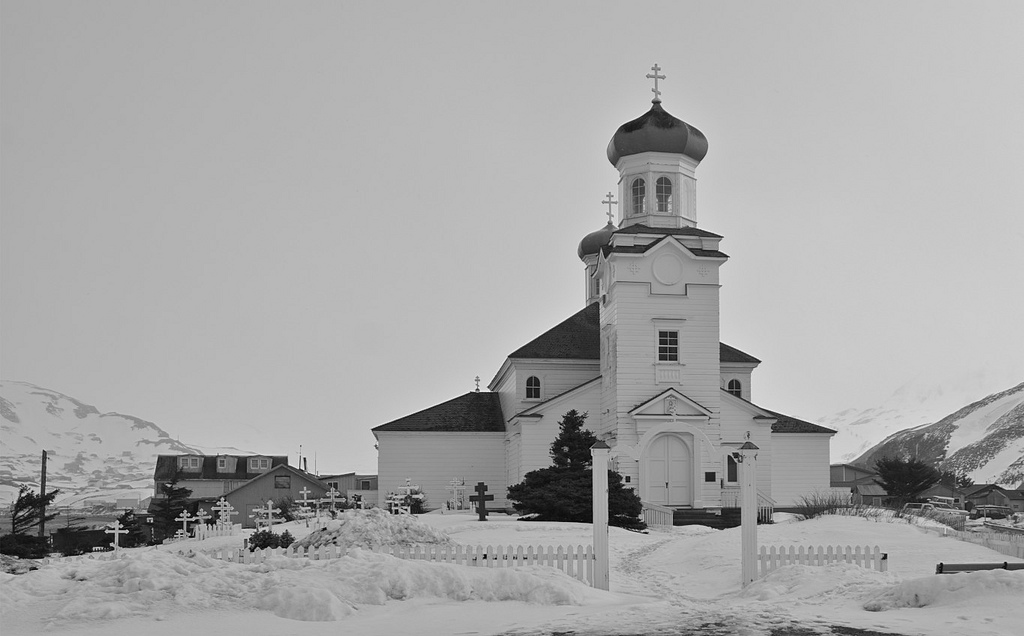
Russian Orthodox Church and churchyard in Alaska

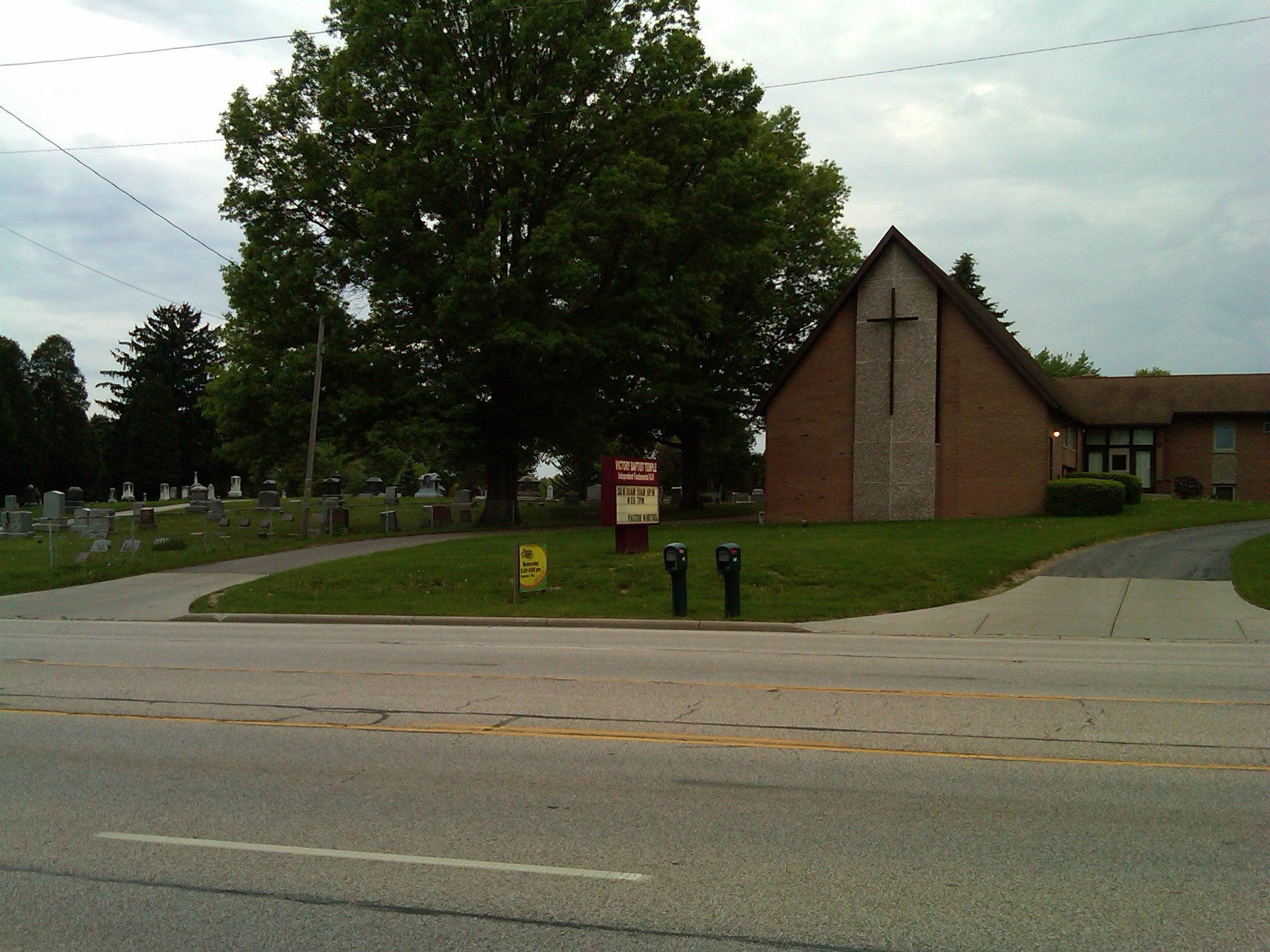
A Baptist church and churchyard in Ohio

An early consequence of the spread of baptism was the construction of churches and churchyards, reflecting the Christian belief that burial in consecrated ground was both a right and duty of the faithful.

After the establishment of the parish as the centre of the Christian spiritual life, the possession of a cemetery, as well as the baptismal font, was a mark of parochial status. During the Middle Ages, religious orders also constructed cemeteries around their churches. Thus, the most common use of churchyards was as a consecrated burial ground known as a graveyard. Graveyards were usually established at the same time as the building of the relevant place of worship (which can date back to the sixth to fourteenth century) and were often used by those families who could not afford to be buried inside or beneath the place of worship itself. However, many churchyards in northwestern France and in the United Kingdom may predate the establishment of the Christian church there today. For example, the existence of the Fortingall Yew, an ancient tree (Taxus baccata) in the churchyard of Fortingall, a village in Perthshire, Scotland, has been used to suggest pre-Christian activity on the site, although yews are difficult to date exactly.

Most surviving headstones and other memorials date no earlier than the seventeenth century, as burial grounds were often reused for subsequent interments and only some families could afford memorials.

The use of churchyards as burial grounds for the deceased was diminished all over Europe in various stages between the eighteenth and nineteenth centuries due to lack of space for new headstones. In many European states, burial in churchyards was outlawed altogether either by royal decrees or government legislation for public hygiene reasons and portions of churchyards were taken for roads to be built or expanded. The loss of part (or all) of the churchyard, often, led also to the removal and permanent loss of centuries-old graves and headstones. In some cases, the human remains were exhumed and the gravestones transferred. In other cases, all headstones have been removed, to create a park-like environment, or simply to facilitate the seasonal cutting and removal of grass or weeds. In at least one case in the United States, the headstones from a churchyard in Pittsburgh were used to help form the foundation for an addition to the church fifty years after the last burial in the churchyard took place (the foundation itself unknowingly went through fifteen graves), with the churchyard itself becoming a parking lot nearly forty years after that; the churchyard was largely forgotten until PennDOT purchased the church property via eminent domain for construction of Interstate 279 and subsequently unearthed 727 graves.

Some churchyards across the world are still used as graveyards today, particularly in most hamlets and small towns. Public cemeteries are primarily seen in major towns and cities.

From the late nineteenth century, remembrance activities have moved away from churchyards towards more "commemorative locales", such as homes, a shift that has appeared to happen alongside the diminishing influence of the church in Britain.

== Ecology ==
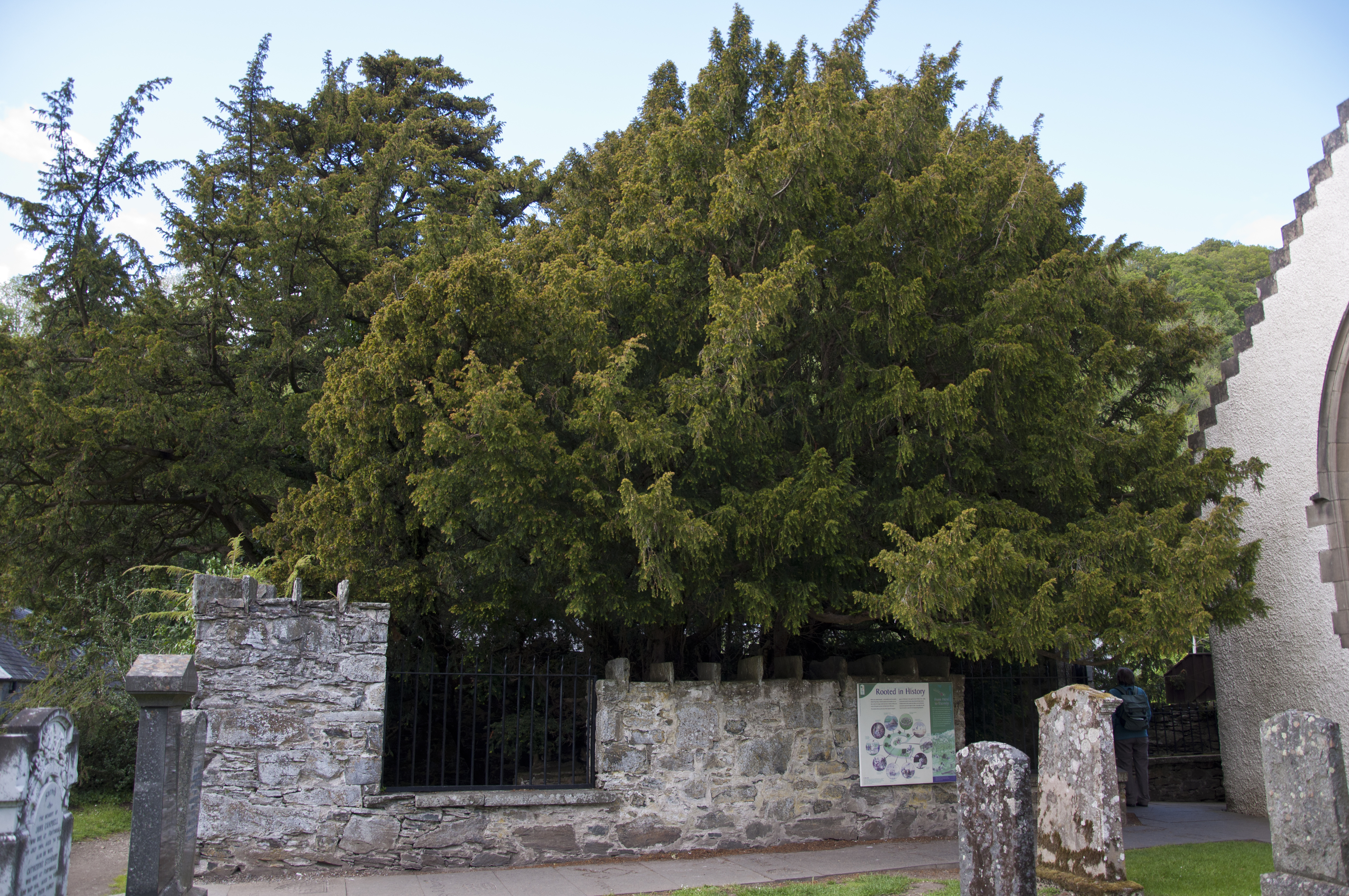
The Fortingall Yew in June 2011. This ancient evergreen has been posited as a sacred tree.

Churchyards can be hosted to unique and ancient habitats because they may remain significantly unchanged for hundreds of years.

== See also ==
- Cemetery
- Church grim
- Corpse road
- Headstone
- Lychgate
- Parish close
- Pogost

== Bibliography ==
- Greenoak, Francesca (November 1985). God's Acre: the flowers and animals of the parish churchyard. E. P. Dutton. ISBN 978-0525243151.
