= Breadalbane Hydro-Electric Scheme =

Multiple power stations in Scotland

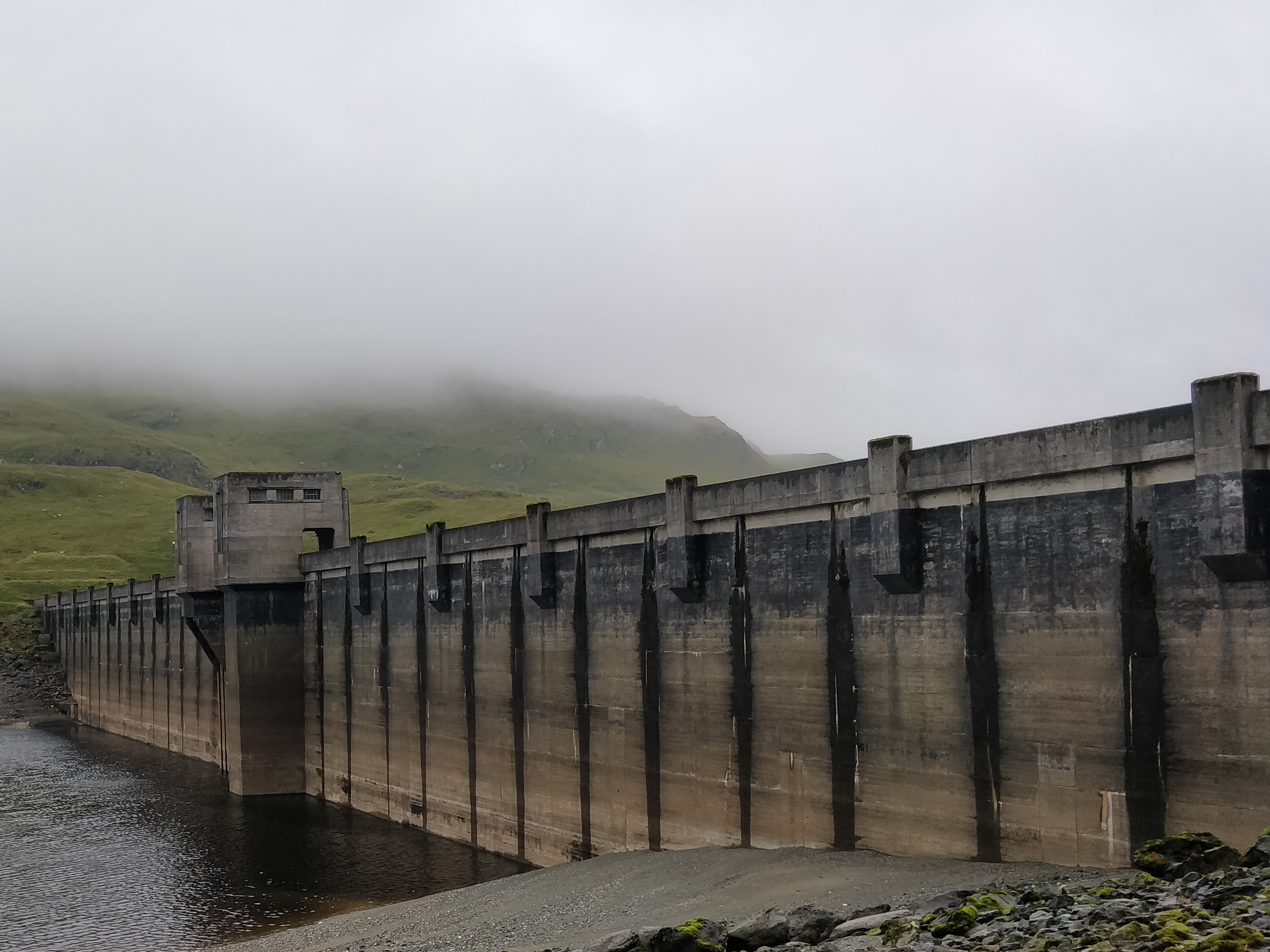
- Lawers Dam was the first to be completed

- Location within Highland
- Interactive map of Breadalbane Hydro-Electric Scheme
- Country: Scotland
- Location: Perthshire
- Coordinates: 56.481°N 4.298°W
- Purpose: Power
- Status: Operational
- Construction began: 1951
- Opening date: 1961
- Owner: SSE
- 7 power stations, 6 dams

The Breadalbane Hydro-Electric Scheme is a hydroelectric scheme in the Breadalbane area of Perthshire, Scotland. It comprises seven power stations which generate 120MW of power from the dams around Loch Lyon, Loch Earn and Loch Tay.

== History ==
The politician Tom Johnston during his time as Secretary of State for Scotland, championed the Hydro-electric Development (Scotland) Act 1943, which created the North of Scotland Hydro-Electric Board. Johnston's vision was for a public body that could build hydro-electric stations throughout the Highlands. Profits made by selling bulk electricity to the Scottish lowlands would be used to fund "the economic development and social improvement of the North of Scotland." Private consumers would be offered a supply of cheap electricity, and their connection to that supply would not reflect the actual cost of its provision in remote and sparsely populated areas.

The chairman of the new Board was to be Lord Airlie, who had initially been critical of the 1943 Act because its scope was too limited. The deputy chairman and chief executive was Edward MacColl, an engineer with wide experience of hydro-electric projects and electrical distribution networks. It soon became clear that MacColl intended to push ahead with the aspirations of the Act at breakneck speeds. He produced a list of 102 potential sites in just three months, and in June 1944, the first constructional scheme was published, for the large Loch Sloy scheme and two much smaller projects at Nostie Bridge and Morar. The Breadalbane scheme and Breadalbane Amendments scheme were published as constructional schemes 25 and 25A.

Construction began in autumn 1951. The first stage was the building of Lawers Dam, at the south-eastern end of Lochan na Lairige. This was a fairly small loch, but its level was raised by 90 feet (27 m), enabling it to store 460 million cubic feet (13,000 Ml) of water. From the dam, a tunnel and pipeline feeds the water to Finlarig power station, located on the shore of Loch Tay at its south-western end. Finlarig contains a single 30 MW Pelton turbine generating set, which is the largest Pelton turbine in Britain. The dam is 1,129 feet (344 m) long and 138 feet (42 m) tall at its highest point. It is of the massive buttress type, for which the dam at Loch Sloy was the prototype. Water descends a vertical distance of 1,362 feet (415 m) from the dam to the power station, the highest drop of any hydro-electric scheme in Scotland for more than fifty years, until it was exceeded by the Glendoe Hydro Scheme in 2009.

To increase the amount of water available, the headwaters of streams that fed into Loch Tay, the River Lyon and the River Lochay were captured by a series of tunnels and aqueducts, increasing its catchment area to 17.4 square miles (45 km^{2}). Additionally, headwaters from two tributaries of the River Lochay are fed directly into the tunnel supplying the power station. The dam has two control towers, on either side of the central spillway. One controls the release of compensation water to the Allt a Moirneas, while the other controls the flow of water into the tunnel to Finlarig power station, which was commissioned in 1955.

The scheme was expanded by the addition of six further power stations, with those to the west and north west of Finlarig comprising the Killin section and those to the south-east of Finlarig comprising the St Fillans section.

=== Killin section ===
The Killin section consists of three power stations, Cashlie, Lubreoch and Lochay, with two major dams and a third smaller one. Furthest west, Lubreoch dam was constructed at the eastern end of Loch Lyon, to the west of the hamlet of Pubil, by James Miller and Partners. It was 1,740 feet (530 m) long and 129 feet (39 m) high from the foundations to the crest. It was of the massive buttress type and was completed in 1958. The catchment area was increased by building a network of tunnels and aqueducts to the south of the dam, picking up the headwaters of a number of tributaries of both the River Lochay and the River Dochart. Lubreoch power station is located below the dam, and was commissioned in 1958. It has a gross head of 98 feet (30 m) and can generate 4 MW. To the north of the power station is Loch an Daimh, which is dammed at its eastern end by Giorra dam. The structure was built by Edmund Nuttall and is 1,518 feet (463 m) long, with a maximum height of 114 feet (35 m). It is also of the massive buttress type, and was completed in 1959. Its catchment has been increased by tunnels and aqueducts to the south and east, picking up tributaries of the River Lyon. A tunnel runs from the dam to Cashlie power station, which discharges into Stronuich Reservoir. It has a gross head of 466 feet (142 m), can generate 11 MW, and was commissioned in 1959.

Stronuich Reservoir is formed by the Stronuich dam, a long low structure that dams the River Lyon. It stores water from the tailraces of Lubreoch and Cashlie power stations. Compensation water to maintain the flow in the River Lyon passes through a generator set below the dam. An intake gatehouse tower is located at the southern end of the dam, and controls the flow of water to Lochay power station. A long tunnel from the reservoir supplies water to Lochay power station, which discharges into the River Lochay a short distance before it joins the River Dochart and enters Loch Tay. It has a gross head of 591 feet (180 m), can generate 47 MW, and was commissioned in 1958.

=== St Fillans section ===
The St Fillans section consists of another three power stations, Lednock, St Fillans and Dalchonzie, with two major dams, Breaclaich and Lednock. Lochan Breaclaich dam prevents water flowing into the Loch Tay catchment. It is a rockfill dam, with a concrete panels on the upstream side and coursed rubble on the downstream side. A gatehouse controls the inlet to a tunnel and pipeline which feeds Lednock power station. A tunnel collects headwaters from streams flowing into Loch Tay to the south-west of the reservoir, while another tunnel conveys water to Lednock power station. This contains a single 4 MW turbine, which is protected by a surge tower to the north-west of the station. The water discharges into Loch Lednock. The power station has a gross head of 299 feet (91 m) and was commissioned in 1961.

Loch Lednock is contained by a diamond-headed buttress dam at its eastern end. The dam was constructed by Taylor Woodrow, is 950 feet (290 m) long and 133 feet (41 m) high. It was completed in 1957. The catchment of Loch Lednock is supplemented by a tunnel collecting the headwaters of the River Almond. There is only one other diamond-headed buttress dam in Scotland, at Errochty. Because it is close to the Highland Boundary Fault, it was designed to cope with earthquakes. A dispersal valve discharges compensation water through the dam to maintain the flow in the River Lednock. There is an intake gatehouse around half way along the loch, which controls the flow of water to St Fillans power station. This was the first of the additional power stations to be commissioned when it was completed in 1957. It has a gross head of 830 feet (250 m) and can generate 21 MW. The power station is constructed underground, whereas all of the others have buildings on the surface. It discharges into Loch Earn, which in turn supplies the River Earn. A small weir just below the outlet from the loch diverts some of the flow into a tunnel to provide power for Dalchonzie power station. It contains a single 4 MW turbine, and discharges back into the Earn. Its gross head is 95 feet (29 m) and it was commissioned in 1958.

=== Development ===
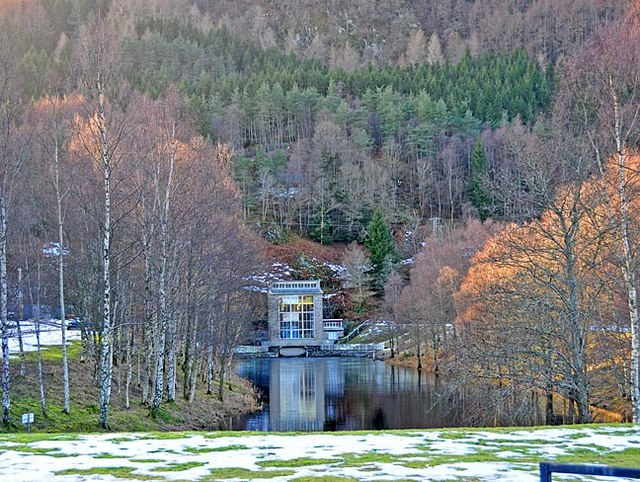
Dalhonzie power station and tailrace

The North of Scotland Hydro-Electric Board were always looking for ways to improve their processes, and there is evidence of this at Breadalbane. The rock fill dam at Breaclaich was built to reduce the amount of cement used, and this technique had previously been used at Quoich. Fly ash was used to replace some of the cement used in the construction of the dams at Lednock, Lubreoch and Giorra. This causes the concrete to harden more slowly, but is less permeable once it has cured. Although several of the dams are similar, they are different in detail, as new methods were used to reduce the amount of concrete and shuttering that was required. The massive buttress dam proved to be considerably cheaper to build than a solid gravity dam, by about 30 per cent.

There were advances in tunnelling techniques too. The main tunnels connected the reservoirs to the power stations, but there were also lots of tunnels used to divert water from other catchments. In total, the scheme involved some 60 miles (97 km) of tunnels, and the Board worked hard to train tunnellers and improve drilling techniques. The tunnel from Stronuich to Lochay is 13 feet 5 inches (4.09 m) in diameter, and some 4.73 miles (7.61 km) long. While a world record was claimed in October 1955 when a collecting tunnel in the St Fillans section advanced by 557 feet (170 m) in seven days, the Lochay tunnellers hit a water-bearing fault which resulted in 50,000 imperial gallons (230 m^{3}) per hour flowing into the workings, and flooding 5,000 feet (1,500 m) of the tunnel. The potential disaster was dealt with relatively easily, by pumping out the tunnel and using cast-iron segments to line a diversion. All of the tunnelling on the Killin section was completed nine months ahead of schedule. Most of the scheme was completed by late 1959, with only the Lednock station held up by issues with the Breaclaich section, resulting in it not being commissioned until March 1961.

== Bibliography ==
- Miller, James (2002). The Dam Builders - Power from the Glens. Birlinn. ISBN 978-1-84158-225-2.
- Payne, Peter L (1988). The Hydro. Aberdeen University Press. ISBN 978-0-08-036584-8.
- Simeons, Charles (1980). Hydro-Power: The Use of Water as an Alternative Source of Energy. Pergamon Press. ISBN 978-1-4831-4561-7.
- Wood, Emma (2002). The Hydro Boys. Luath Press. ISBN 978-1-84282-016-2.
