= Meall Garbh =

Meall Garbh, meaning 'Rough Round hill' (meall means 'lump' in Gaelic), may refer to several hills in Scotland:

- Meall Garbh (Càrn Mairg Group), a 968 m Munro on the north side of Glen Lyon
- Meall Garbh (Glen Kinglass), a 701 m Marilyn on the south side of Glen Kinglass; see List of Grahams (mountains)
- Meall Garbh (Lawers Group), a 1123 m Munro on the south side of Glen Lyon
