= Fortingall Yew =

European yew tree in Perthshire, Scotland

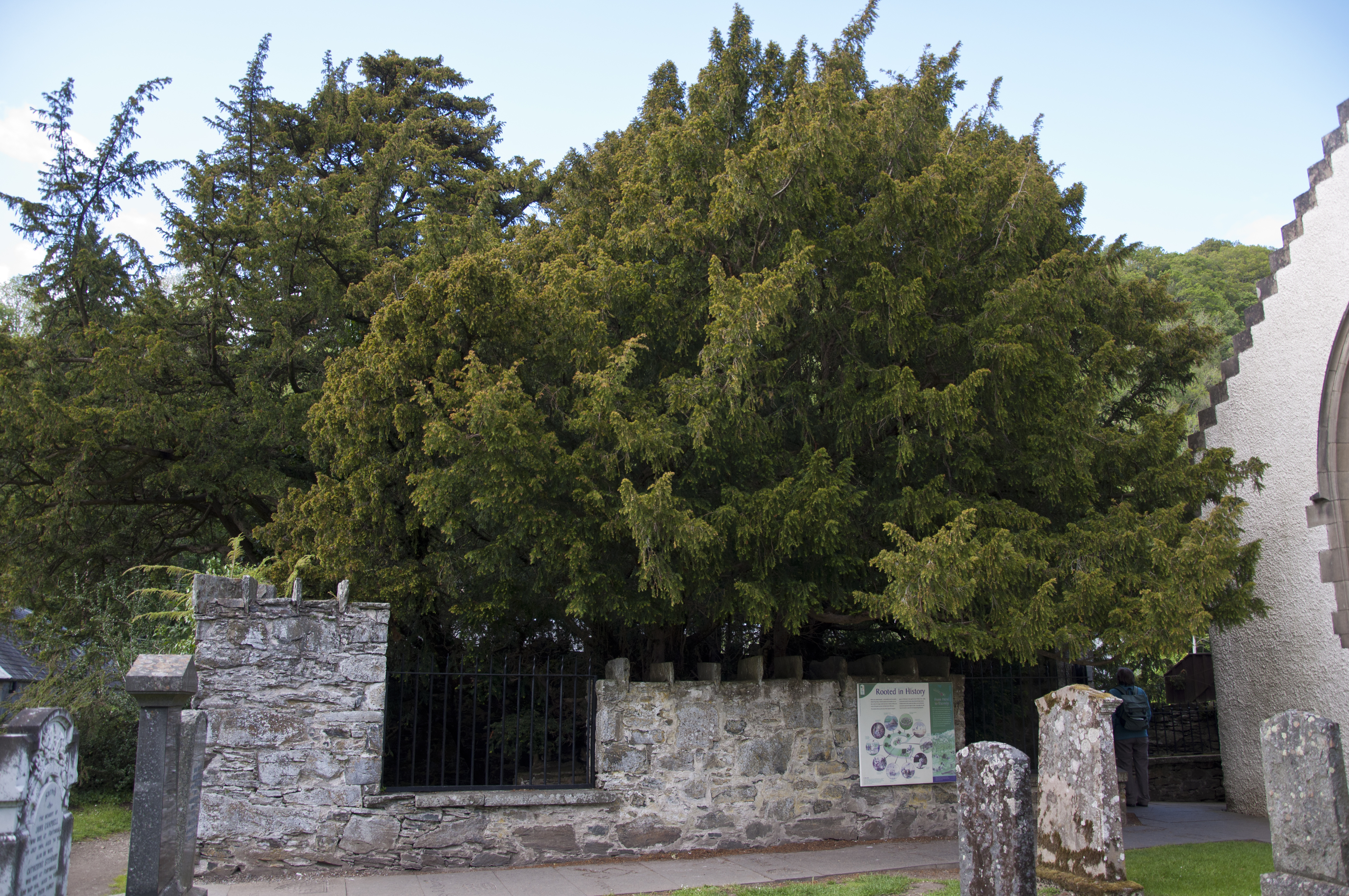
- The yew in June 2011

- Location within the United Kingdom Location within Scotland Location within Perth and Kinross
- Species: European yew (Taxus baccata)
- Coordinates: 56°35′54″N 4°03′03″W
- Date seeded: circa 2,000 BC

The Fortingall Yew is an ancient European yew (Taxus baccata) in the churchyard of the village of Fortingall in Perthshire, Scotland. Considered one of the oldest trees in Britain, modern estimates place its age at an average of 5,000 years. This makes it one of the oldest non-clonal trees in Europe. The trunk was recorded in 1771 as having a girth of 56 ft (17 m), but since then the heartwood has been damaged and decayed. The tree is male but one branch has started to bear berries.

== Age ==
Some estimates put the tree's age at between 2,000 and 3,000 years; it may also be a remnant of a post-Roman Christian site and around 1,500 years old. Others have suggested an age as great as 5,000 to 9,000 years. Forestry and Land Scotland consider it to be 5,000 years old. This makes it one of the oldest known non-clonal trees in Europe. (The root system of the Norway spruce Old Tjikko in Sweden, which is a clonal tree, is at least 9,500 years old.) The Fortingall Yew is possibly the oldest living tree in Britain.

== The tree ==
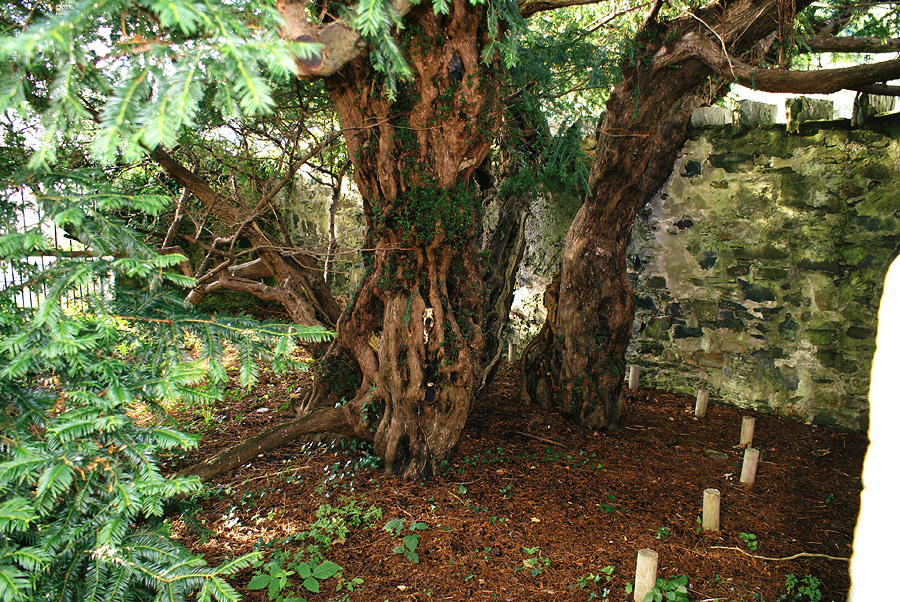
One trunk of the Fortingall Yew

The tree's once massive trunk (56 ft or 17 m in girth when it was measured in 1771) with a former head of unknown original height, is split into several separate stems, giving the impression of several smaller trees, with loss of the heartwood rings that would establish its true age. This is a result both human damage and the natural decay of the ancient heartwood, which reduced the centre of the trunk down to ground level by 1770. Other than this, the tree is still in good health, and may last for many more centuries. By 1833 it was noted that "large arms had been removed and even masses of the trunk, carried off, to make drinking-cups and other curiosities." It is protected by a low wall, erected in 1785 to preserve it, but can still be easily viewed.

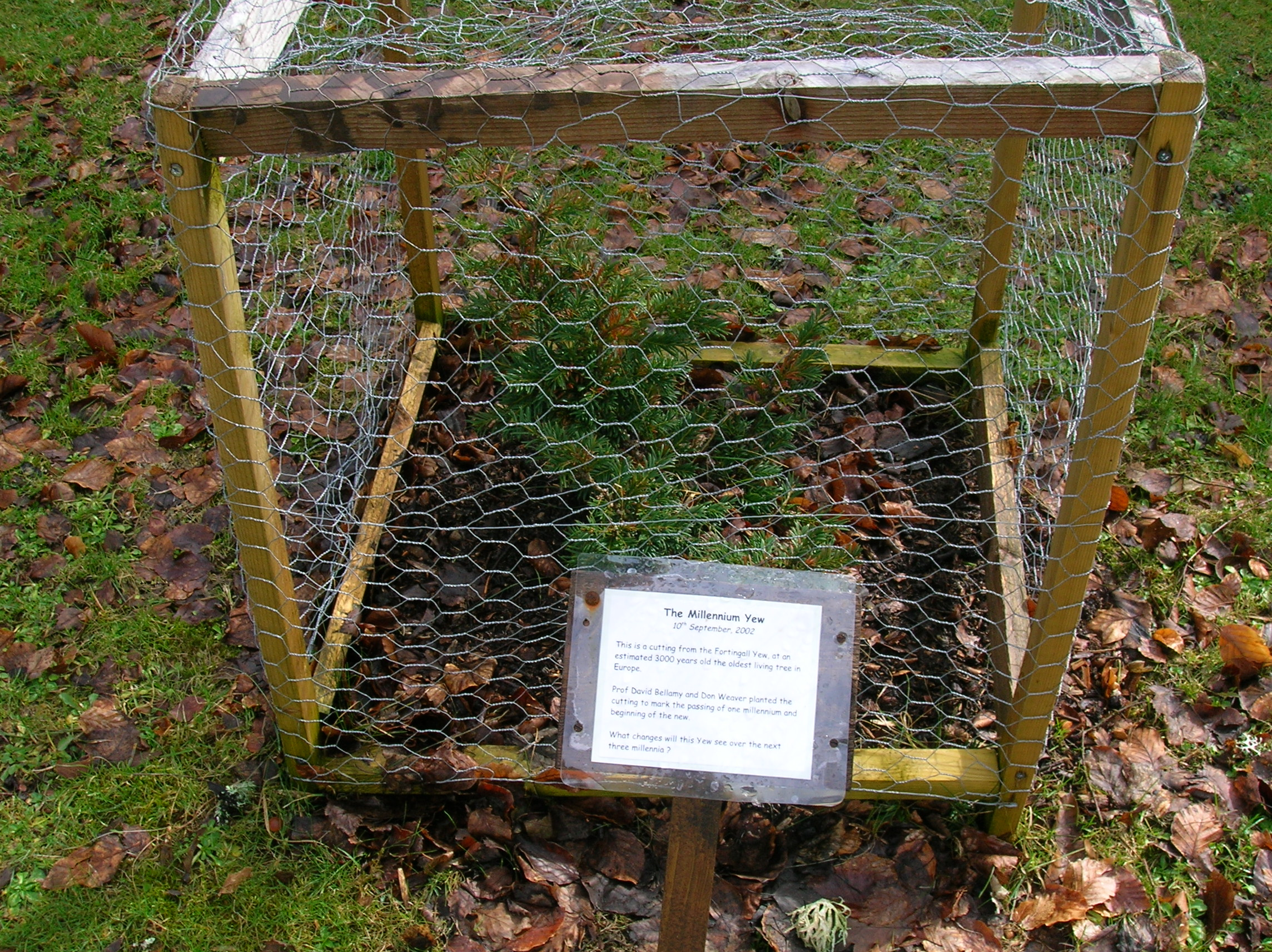
A cutting of the Fortingall Yew at Kindrogan Field Studies Centre

Clippings from the tree have been taken to the Royal Botanic Gardens, Edinburgh, to form part of a mile-long hedge. The purpose of this "Yew Conservation Hedge Project" is to maintain the DNA of Taxus baccata from ancient specimens in the UK as, worldwide, the trees are threatened by felling and disease.

In 2019 concern was expressed by the Tree Warden for Fortingall and the coordinator of the Tayside Biodiversity Community Partnership that tourist activity on and around the tree posed a threat to its survival.

== History ==
The area immediately surrounding Fortingall has a variety of prehistoric archaeological sites including Càrn na Marbh, a Bronze Age tumulus. Place-name and archaeological evidence hint at an Iron Age cult centre at Fortingall, which may have had this tree as its focus. The site was Christianised during the Early Middle Ages, with the yew already full grown, perhaps because it was already a sacred place. Rev. James MacGregor, author of the Book of the Dean of Lismore, was a minister in the church during the 16th century.

The tree was first described in 1769 by Daines Barrington in Philosophical Transactions, where it is recorded as having a circumference of 52 feet (1560 cm). Thomas Pennant measured the yew in 1771 and found it had an astonishing girth of 56 feet (1680 cm). In 1831 Augustin de Candolle, the Swiss botanist who pioneered counting tree rings to age a tree, and referring to details published in 1770, thought this yew was between 2500 to 2600 years old. A memoir of 1836 recollected that in 1804, "the boys of the village" had damaged the yew "kindling their fire of Bealltuinn at its root." For a length of time in the 19th century, funerals held at the church typically paraded through the gap at the center of its trunk, according to John Lindsay’s 1884 article On Yews, With Special Reference to the Fortingall Yew, in the journal Transactions of the Edinburgh Field Naturalists’ and Microscopical Club.

== Sex of the tree ==
The yew is male; however, in 2015, scientists from the Royal Botanic Garden Edinburgh reported that one small branch on the outer part of the crown had changed sex and begun to bear a small group of arils, an occurrence occasionally noted in some dioecious plants, including yews. This is possibly a result of environmental stress. The seeds have been preserved for study and will be used to help maintain genetic diversity in yews.

== Legend ==
According to local legend, Pontius Pilate was born in its shade and played there as a child. Dr Paul S. Philippou, honorary research fellow in history at the University of Dundee, has suggested the legend is historically inaccurate and is an embellished myth.

== See also ==
- List of individual trees
- List of oldest trees
- List of Great British Trees

== Sources ==
- Bevan-Jones, Robert (2004). The ancient yew: a history of Taxus baccata. Bollington: Windgather Press. ISBN 0-9545575-3-0.
- Keay, J.; Keay, J. (1994). Collins Encyclopaedia of Scotland. London: HarperCollins. ISBN 0002550822.
- Lindsay, John (1884). "On yews—with special reference to the Fortingall Yew". Transactions of the Edinburgh Field Naturalists' and Microscopical Club (85).
