= Churchyards in northwestern France =

Main article Churchyards

Churchyards in northwestern France are often much older than the church itself. The shape and the height are both indicators of age. Churches often sit on sites of great antiquity, long predating Christianity.

== Age indicators and location ==
The general rectangular shape of today's churchyard began in the Early Middle Ages, so sometimes older grounds are indicated by oval or round forms. Selection of a location by the church involved commandeering pagan holy places, which were linked to landscape features. Springs were particularly important as they were thought of as points of contact between the underworld and the surface world. These locations were associated with particular pre-Christian gods and goddesses, sometimes Roman gods had previously replaced Gallic or Celts ones. Christian missionaries were specifically instructed to take over sites of pagan worship, thus depriving the old gods of their perches, but also enabling the Christian religion to inherit some of the sanctity that native people associated with the site.

Another broad indication of greater antiquity is the height of the churchyard earth in relation to the ground outside the walls. Centuries of repeated burials in the same location resulted in the gradual elevation of terrain.

== Historic uses ==
Today a churchyard looks quiet and somber but in medieval times, despite protests by generations of bishops, the church grounds were popular sites for games, gatherings, dancing and dalliances. The church grounds being the only public grounds available. News and gossip brought out an audience, often after mass. Before the 17th century gravestones were rare with most country churches having none before the 18th century.

The churchyard cross usually was the only obstacle for the frequent activities on the church grounds. This cross was always found on the sunlite side mounted on stepped base, and indicated that the churchyard was consecrated ground. Sunny southern side of the church was the favored spot for burials. The northern exposure, associated with the devil, was designated for the graves of strangers, unbaptised children, outcasts and suicides. During the 18th and 19th centuries, the increased use of stone monuments, brought pressure to use these shadow realms. Archery sometimes was practiced on these northern sides as well because less activity happened there.
