= Meall Garbh (Càrn Mairg Group) =

Mountain in Perth and Kinross, Scotland

Coordinates: 56.63749°N 4.20923°W

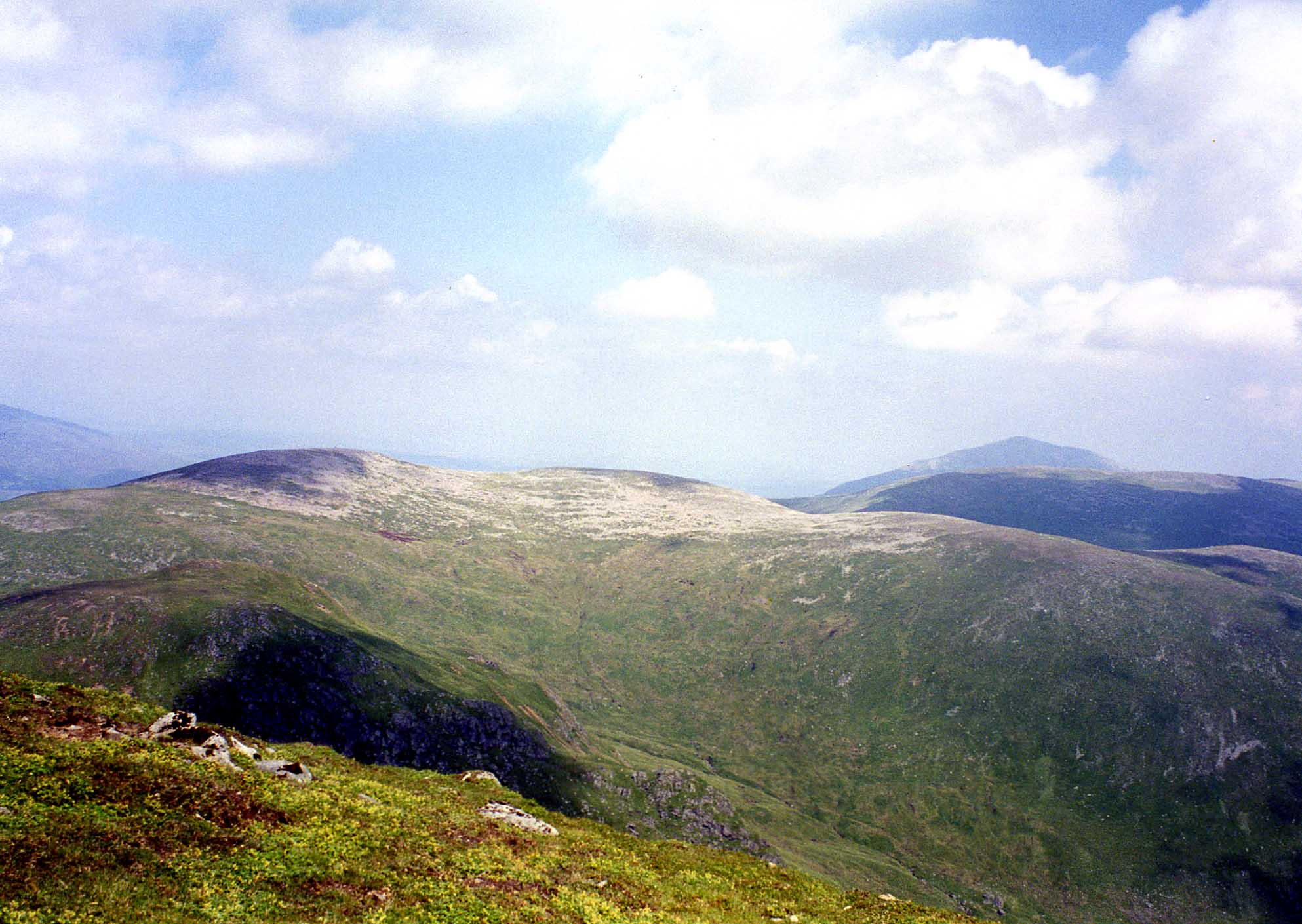
- Meall Garbh seen across the headwaters of the Invervar Burn from Càrn Gorm, two km to the SW.

Highest point
- Elevation: 968 m (3,176 ft)
- Prominence: 104 m (341 ft)
- Listing: Munro

Naming
- English translation: rough hill
- Language of name: Gaelic
- Pronunciation: Scottish Gaelic: [ˈmjaul̪ˠ ˈkaɾav]

Geography
- Location: Perth and Kinross, Scotland
- Parent range: Grampians
- OS grid: NN646517
- Topo map: OS Landranger 51

Meall Garbh is a mountain on the north side of Glen Lyon in the Scottish Highlands. The flat summit of the hill has two tops of almost equal height, the north-west one being considered the higher.

Meall Garbh is usually climbed as part of a circuit of the watershed of the Invervar burn, a 14 kilometre route taking four Munros. If done clockwise Meall Garbh is the second summit reached, following Càrn Gorm. The following two summits are Càrn Mairg and Meall nan Aighean.

The summit cairn of Meall Garbh is unusual in that it is composed of old iron stake posts, rather than stones.
