= Loch Lyon =

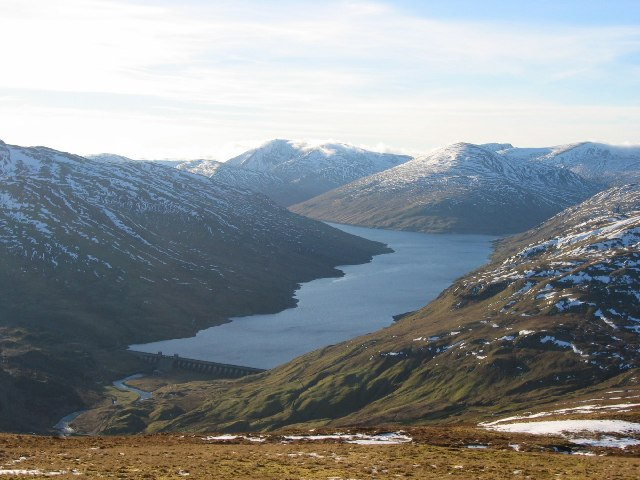
- Loch Lyon from An Grianan. Beyond the loch the highest hill is Beinn Dorain.

- Location within Perth and Kinross
- Location: Glen Lyon, Perth
- Coordinates: 56.540800°N 4.568°W
- Type: freshwater loch, reservoir
- Primary outflows: River Lyon
- Basin countries: Scotland
- Max. length: 2.81 km (1.75 mi)
- Max. width: 0.40 km (0.25 mi)
- Surface area: 492.3 ha (1,216 acres)
- Average depth: 25 ft (7.6 m) before construction of dam.
- Max. depth: 100 ft (30 m) before construction of dam.
- Shore length^{1}: 21.2 km (13.2 mi)
- Surface elevation: 344 m (1,129 ft)
- ^{1} Shore length is not a well-defined measure.

Loch Lyon (Scottish Gaelic, Loch Lìobhann) is a freshwater loch in Glen Lyon, located in Perthshire, Scotland, which feeds the River Lyon, a tributary of the River Tay. Loch Lyon lies in Glen Lyon, that is the longest enclosed Glen in Scotland, stretching over 30 miles (50 kilometres) from Fortingall in the east to Loch Lyon in the west. Sir Walter Scott described Glen Lyon as the longest, loneliest and loveliest glen in Scotland.

== Reservoir ==
The original natural loch was much expanded by a hydro-electric dam, part of the North of Scotland Hydro-Electric Board's Breadalbane scheme.
