= Glen Lyon =

Glen in the United Kingdom

Coordinates: 56.594°N 4.303°W

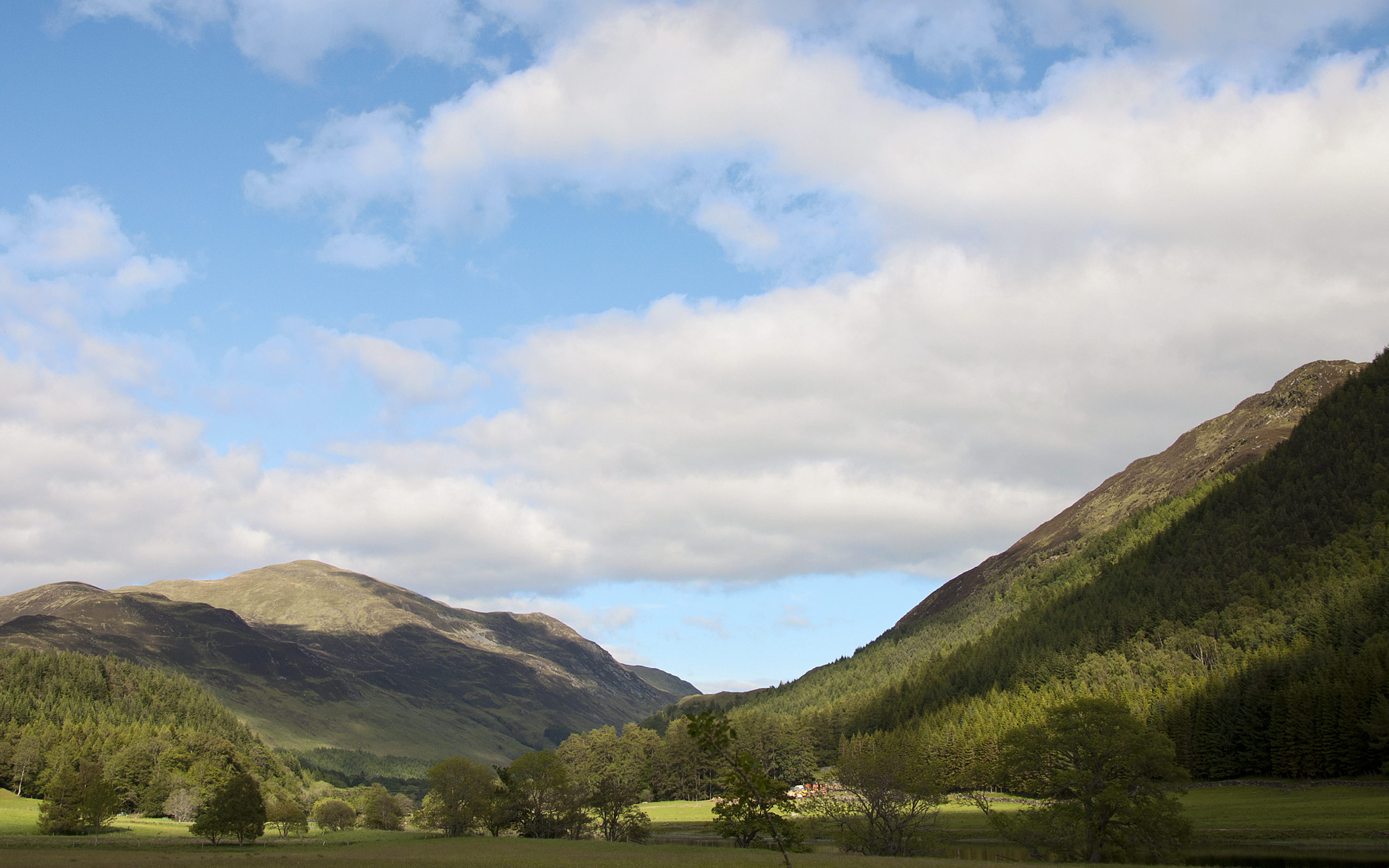
Glen Lyon from Bridge of Balgie

Glen Lyon (Scottish Gaelic: Gleann Lìomhann) is a glen in the Perth and Kinross region of Scotland. It is the longest enclosed glen in Scotland and runs for 34 miles (55 kilometres) from Loch Lyon in the west to the village of Fortingall in the east.

This glen was also known as An Crom Ghleann ("The Bent Glen"). The land given over to the MacGregors was An Tòiseachd. It forms part of the Loch Rannoch and Glen Lyon National Scenic Area, one of forty such areas in Scotland, which are defined so as to identify areas of exceptional scenery and to ensure its protection from inappropriate development by restricting certain forms of development. Sir Walter Scott described Glen Lyon as the "longest, loneliest and loveliest glen in Scotland". Apart from a few scattered farms and cottages throughout the glen, the only real settlements are at Fortingall and Bridge of Balgie.

The glen contains several small hamlets and has a primary school where Gaelic is taught weekly.

== History ==
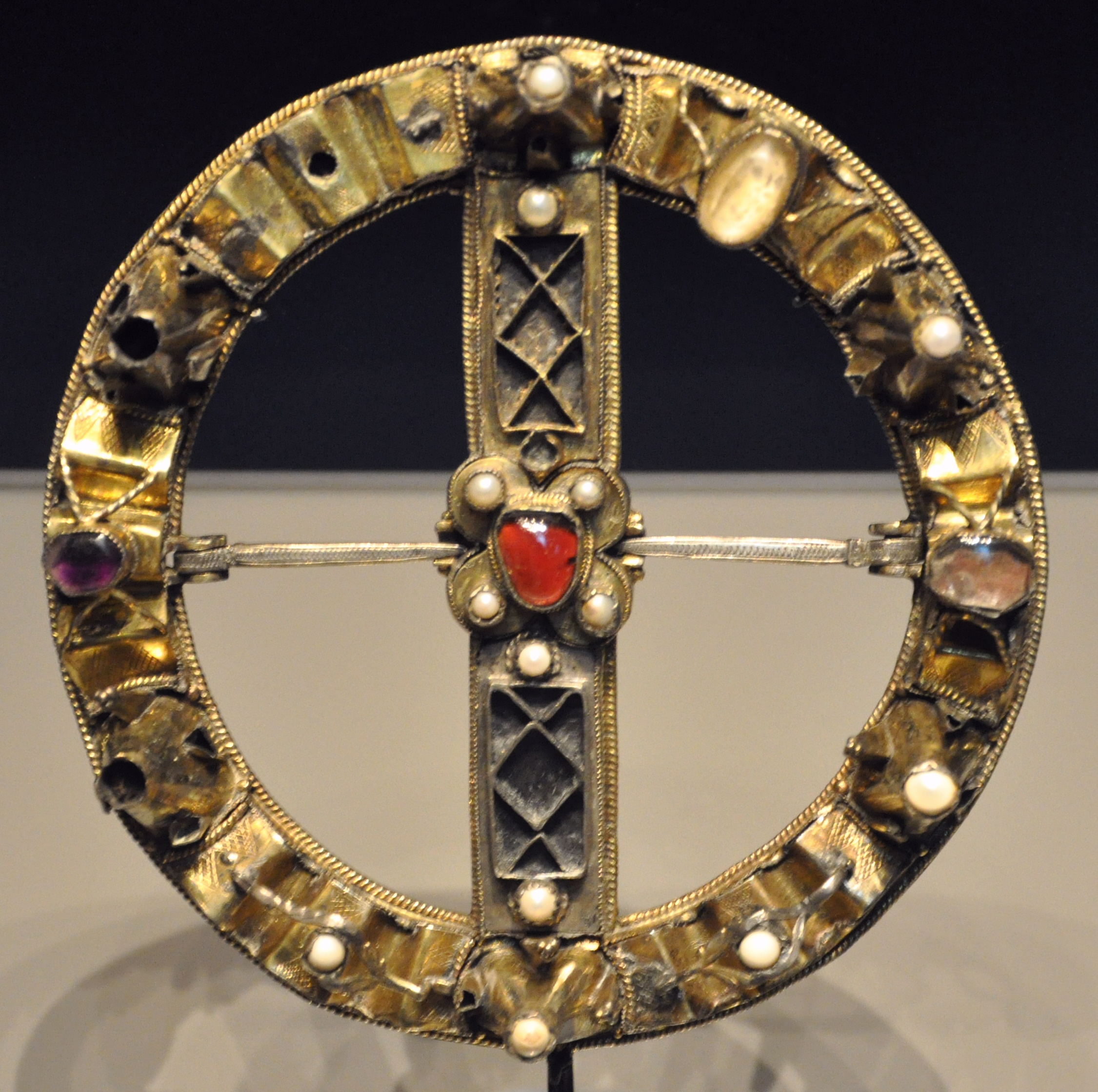
Glen Lyon (or Glenlyon) Brooch on display in the British Museum

Quite densely inhabited from prehistoric times (as many archaeological sites attest), although its present population is of modest size, the glen has been home to many Scottish clans, including Clan MacGregor, Lyon, Menzies, Stewart, Macnaughtan, MacGibbon and the Campbell lairds of Glen Lyon.

At the end of the 11th century the de Leons (later shortened to "Lyon") had come north with Prince Edgar, son of Malcolm III of Scotland to fight against his uncle, Donald Bane. Edgar was victorious and the de Leons received lands that were later called Glen Lyon in Perthshire. Local Tacksman Robert Campbell of Glenlyon (1630–1696), led the troops of the Earl of Argyll's Regiment of Foot during their involvement in the infamous massacre of the MacDonalds at Glencoe in 1691. A magnificent silver-gilt brooch set with precious stones belonging to the Campbell lairds of Glen Lyon (that has been dated to the early 16th century) is currently in the British Museum.

Glen Lyon, also written Glenlyon, has been the home of (among others) early Christian monks (including Adomnán [locally Eonán] (died 704), Abbot of Iona and biographer of St Columba). It contains at least two castles: Meggernie Castle [still inhabited] and Carnbane Castle [ruined].

Their history is described in Alexander Stewart's A Highland Parish (1928), and Duncan Campbell's The Lairds of Glenlyon (1886).

== Notable people ==
- Isobel Forrester an ecumenist was born at Glenlyon manse in 1895.
- Fr. James MacGregor (Scottish Gaelic: Maighstir Seumas MacGriogair), parish priest of Fortingall for the Catholic Church in Scotland during the early 16th-century, compiled the Book of the Dean of Lismore, the most important surviving manuscript collection of medieval Scottish Gaelic literature. His Chronicle, covering local events in a mixture of Middle Scots and Ecclesiastical Latin, is also still extant, and is an important historical source for the central Highlands.
- Watson Kirkconnell (1895–1977), a Canadian poet and public intellectual of proudly Highland Scottish descent, explored the legacy of his Glen Lyon ancestors in his memoirs.

== Gallery ==
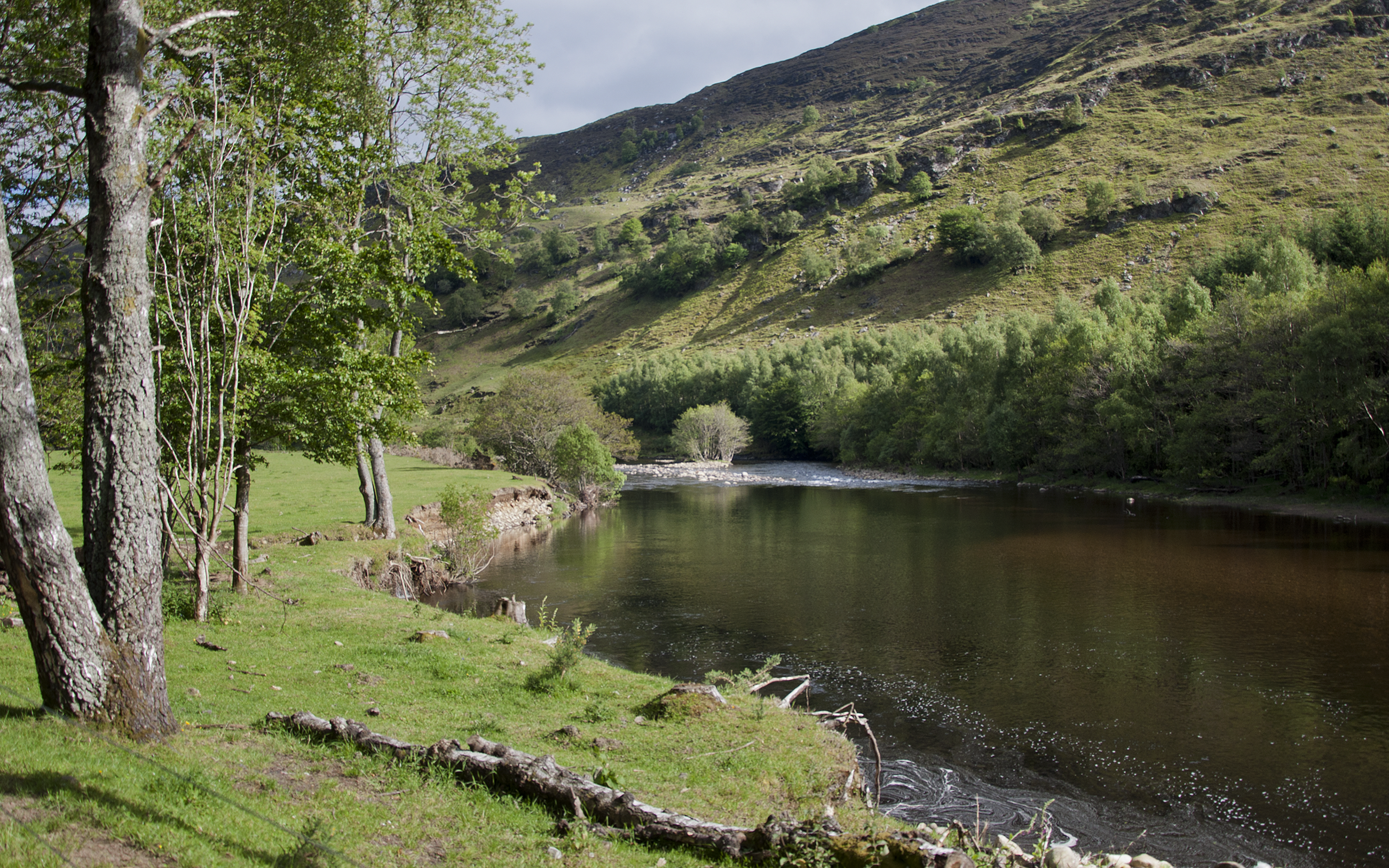
River Lyon

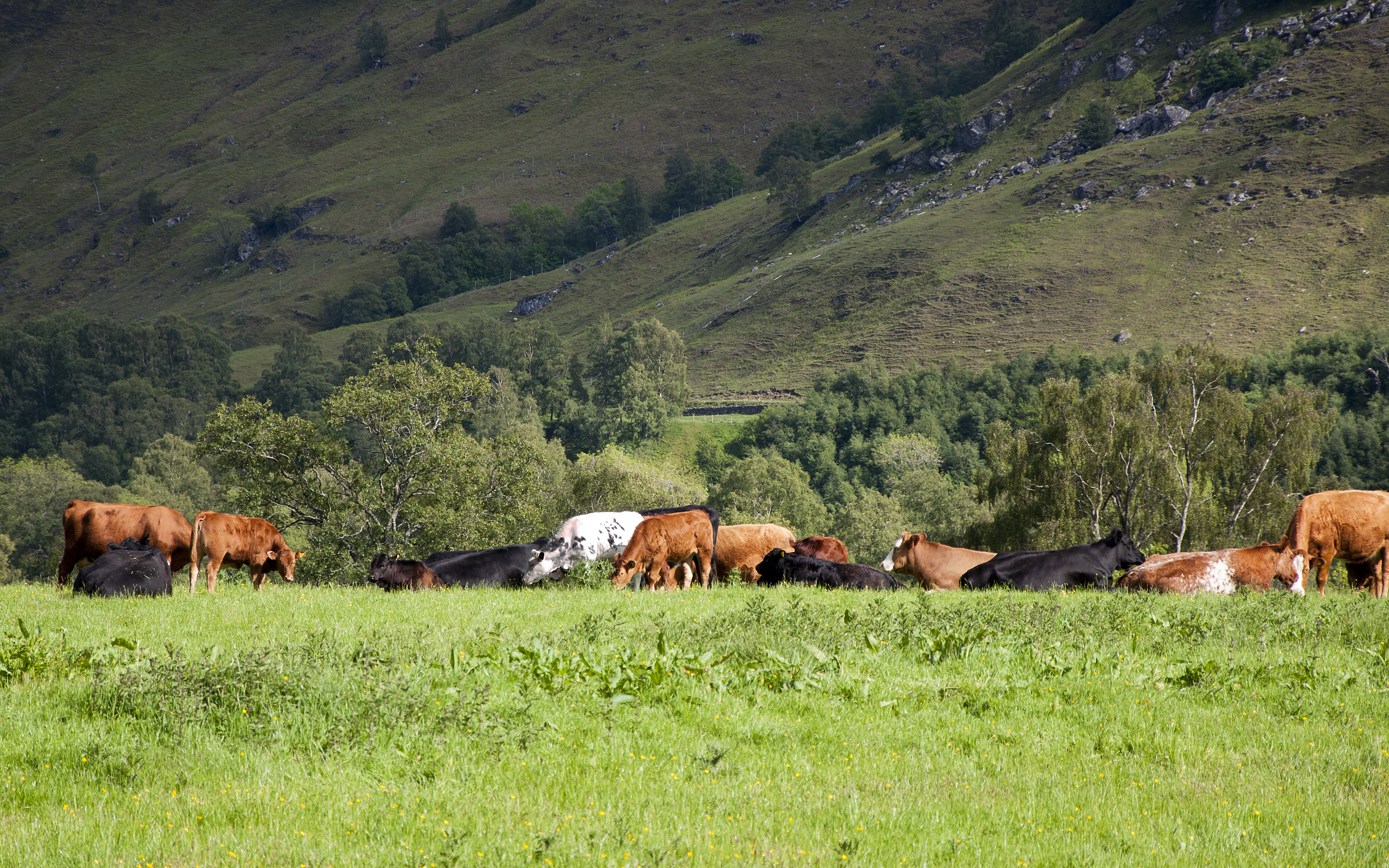
Cattle in Glen Lyon
