= Fortingall =

Village in Perthshire, Scotland

Coordinates: 56.598°N 04.055°W

Fortingall: Scottish Gaelic: Fartairchill
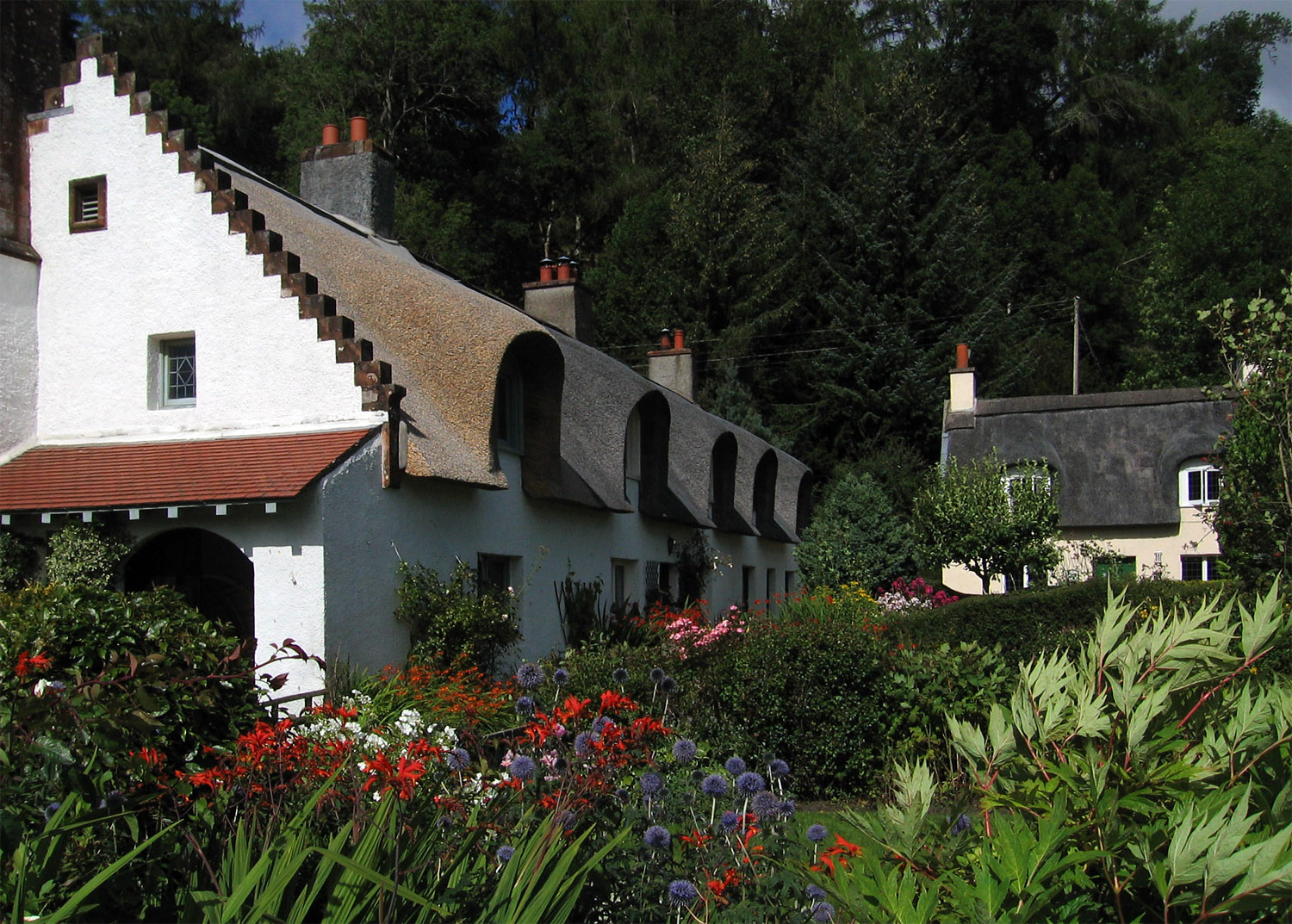
- Cottages in Fortingall

- Location within Perth and Kinross
- OS grid reference: NN739470
- Council area: Perth and Kinross
- Country: Scotland
- Sovereign state: United Kingdom
- Post town: ABERFELDY
- Postcode district: PH15
- Dialling code: 01887
- Police: Scotland
- Fire: Scottish
- Ambulance: Scottish
- UK Parliament: Angus and Perthshire Glens
- Scottish Parliament: Perthshire North

Fortingall (Scottish Gaelic: Fartairchill) (lit. "Escarpment Church"—i.e. "church at the foot of an escarpment or steep slope") is a small village in Glen Lyon, Perthshire, Scotland. Its nearest sizable neighbours are Aberfeldy and Kenmore.

Local legend claims that it was the birthplace of Pontius Pilate, although he was born well before the Roman conquest and became famous in the biblical account of Jesus's death 30 years before the Romans first reached this part of Scotland. A number of other locations, including villages in Spain and Germany, make similar claims. It is also famous for the Fortingall Yew, the village's churchyard yew tree that could be over 5,000 years old, and thus one of the oldest living things in Europe.

== Parish church ==
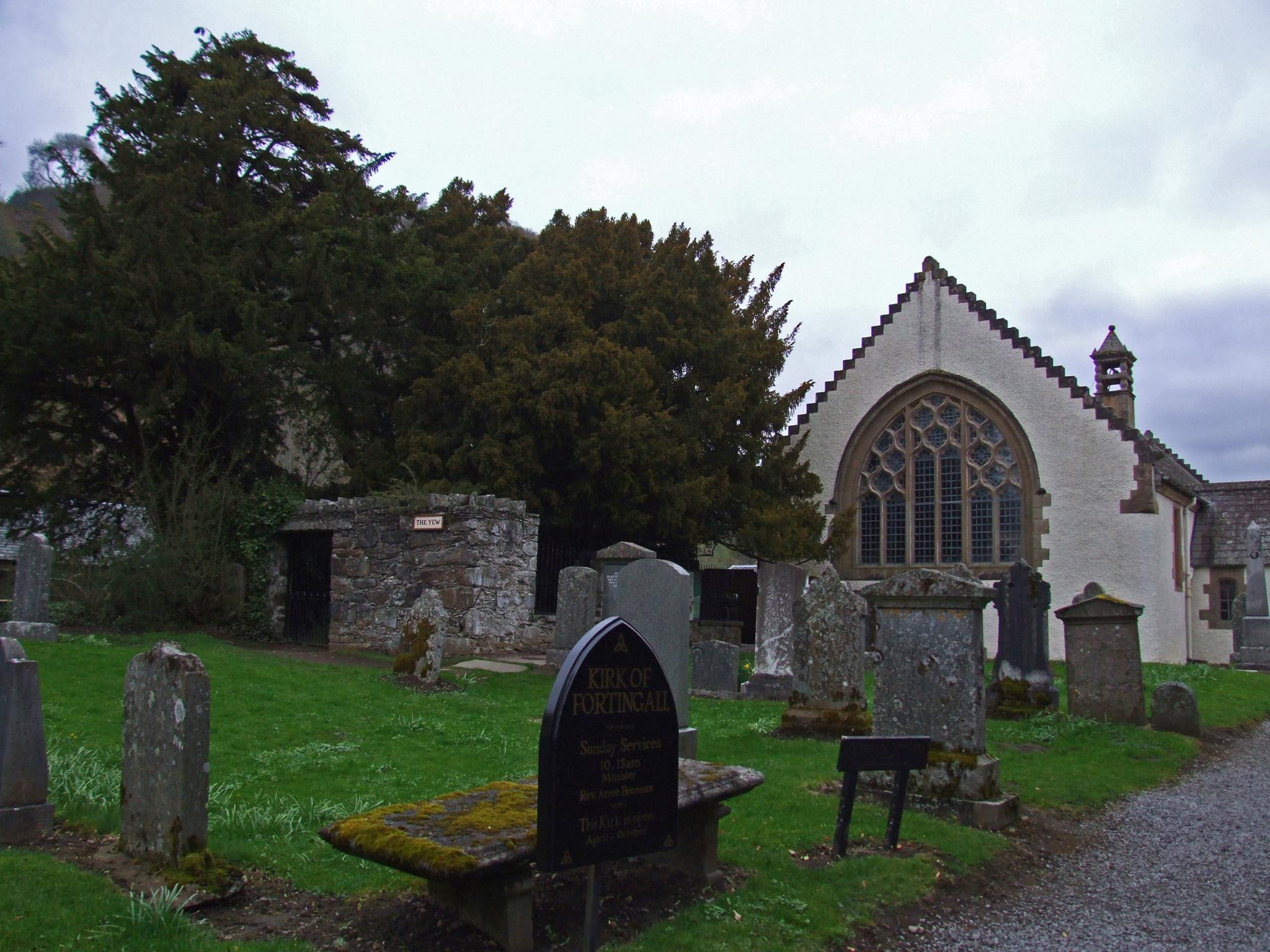
Fortingall Parish Church

The parish church is on an early Christian site, dedicated to Coeddi, bishop of Iona (d. 712), probably founded about 700 AD from Iona itself as a daughter monastery. Though undocumented, crop-marks of surrounding ditched enclosures have been identified from the air, and the church's unusual dedication and fragments of several finely carved cross-slabs preserved in the church all point to an early origin as a major church site. Also preserved in an alcove in the church was an early hand-bell in Irish style (iron with bronze coating), dating from the 7th or 8th century, one of several to have survived in Highland Perthshire; the bell was stolen in 2017. Several slabs with simple incised crosses (best paralleled at Iona and other west of Scotland sites) and a massive early font are to be seen in the churchyard. The attractive white-harled parish church (built 1901–02), notable for its fine woodwork, is open in summer. Its Arts and Crafts style was designed to harmonise with the rest of the village. A permanent display on the cross-slabs and the early church was recently installed in the building. Fortingall has one of the largest collections of early medieval sculpture in Scotland.

=== The yew tree ===
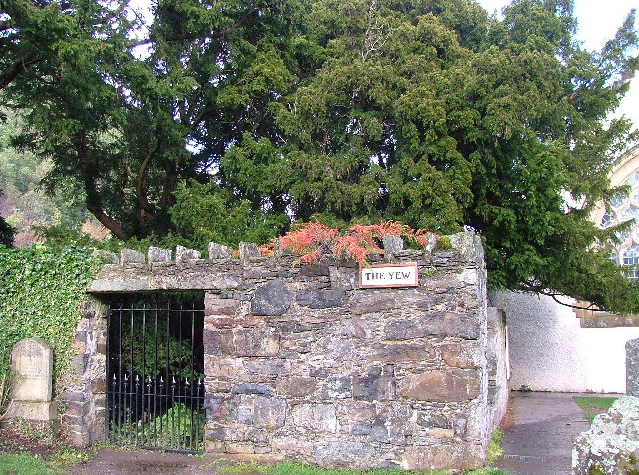
The Fortingall Yew

The Fortingall Yew is an ancient tree in its own walled enclosure within the village churchyard. Its age has been estimated between 2000 and 9000 years – with the higher estimate putting it in contention of the oldest living tree – perhaps even the oldest living thing – in Europe. Place-name and archaeological evidence hint at an Iron Age cult centre at Fortingall, which may have had this tree as its focus. The site was Christianised during the Middle Ages, perhaps because it was already a sacred place.

== Village planning ==
The attractive village, with its large hotel adjoining the churchyard, was built in 1890–1891 by shipowner and Unionist MP, Sir Donald Currie, who bought the Glenlyon Estate – including the village – in 1885. It was designed by the architect James M MacLaren and built by John McNaughton. The thatched cottages are notable examples of a planned village built in vernacular style (here combining both Lowland Scottish and English influences, notably from Devon) and are increasingly appreciated as one of the most important examples of 'arts and crafts' vernacular style in Scotland. Following roof fires in the 1970s and 1980s, several thatched roofs were converted to tiles and remain so today. The Fortingall Hotel, which was restored to its original appearance in 2006–2007, is an important example of Scottish vernacular revival. It is based on the tower-houses and burgh architecture of the 16th and 17th centuries, but in a modern idiom which anticipates the buildings of Charles Rennie Mackintosh, whose work MacLaren influenced.

Glenlyon House, and its adjoining Farm and steading, west of the village, were also designed, or largely rebuilt, to MacLaren's designs.

== Archaeology ==
The area immediately surrounding Fortingall has one of the richest concentrations of prehistoric archaeological sites in Scotland, including Càrn nam Marbh, Gaelic 'Cairn of the Dead', a re-used Bronze Age tumulus that is said to have been used as a burial ground for plague victims in the 14th century, and a focus for the villages Samhain festival. Other sites include the Fortingall stone circle, standing stones including the Bridge of Lyon, 'four-poster' stone settings, 'ring-forts' (massive Iron Age house enclosures), many cup and ring marked stones (including one dug-up, and preserved, in the churchyard) and an extremely well-preserved medieval homestead moat, thought by early antiquarians to be of Roman origin because of its regular shape.

Fortingall parish (now linked with Glenlyon) is one of the largest on Scotland, and takes in Glen Lyon, notable for its mountain scenery and many archaeological sites, the country's longest enclosed glen or mountain valley.

== Gallery ==
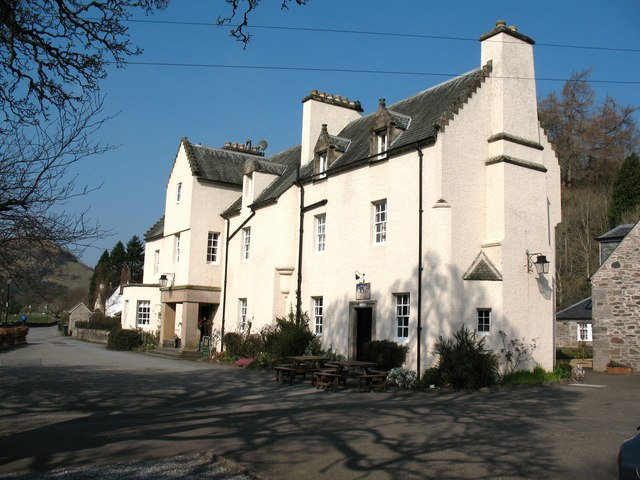
Fortingall Hotel

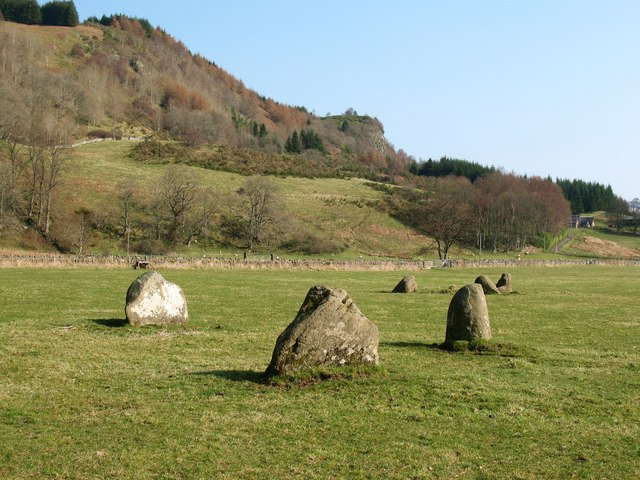
Stone circles
