= List of mountains of the British Isles by height (501–1000) =

Highest mountains in Great Britain ("Simms" classification)
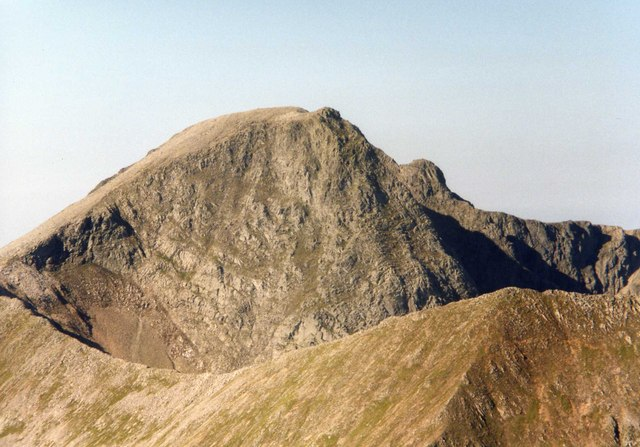
- Ben Nevis, in the Scottish Highlands, is the highest mountain in The British Isles

Highest point
- Elevation: over 600 m (1,969 ft)
- Prominence: over 30 m (98 ft)

Geography
- Location: 2,756 British Isles: 2,192 Scotland; 223 Ireland (Note: As of October 2018, the Irish MountainViews Online Database, list the prominence of Knockbrinnea (W) as 29m, and Carrignabinnia as 27 m, and thus they do not qualify as Irish Arderins, which means that MountainViews does not classify these two peaks as Simms; the total number of Irish Arderins over 600 m is thus 222. The DoBIH however uses the Harvey Tables which list the prominence for both at 30 m, and thus the DoBIH class them as Irish Simms, giving 224 Irish Simms in total.); 192 England; 150 Wales; 1 Isle of Man

This article provides access to lists of mountains in Britain and Ireland by height and by prominence. (See Lists of mountains below.) Height and prominence are the most important metrics for the classifications of mountains by the UIAA; with isolation a distant third criterion. (Note: No definition of a British Isles mountain or hill uses an explicit quantitative metric of topographic isolation (e.g. distance to the next point of equal height), however, the concept of isolation is embedded in the qualitative definition of a Scottish Munro, from the Scottish Mountaineering Club requirement of "sufficient separation" (instead of prominence).) The list is sourced from the Database of British and Irish Hills ("DoBIH") (Note: The Database of British and Irish Hills ("DoBIH") is the most referenced database for the classification of peaks in the British Isles, and the DoBIH is licensed under a "Creative Commons Attribution 3.0 Unported License".) for peaks that meet the consensus height threshold for a mountain, namely 600 metres (1,969 ft); the list also rules out peaks with a prominence below 30 metres (98 ft) and thus, the list is therefore precisely a list of the 2,756 (Note: Some sites list 2753 Simms, however, the Database of British and Irish Hills ("DoBIH") has added an extra Irish Simm, Knockbrinnea (W), bringing the total as at October 2022 to 2756.) Simms in the British Isles (as at October 2022). Many classifications of mountains in the British Isles consider a prominence between 30–150 metres (98–492 ft) as being a "top", and not a mountain; however, using the 30 metres (98 ft) prominence threshold gives the broadest possible list of mountains. For a ranking of mountains with a higher prominence threshold use:

- List of Marilyns in the British Isles, for ranking by height and by prominence, of peaks with prominence over 150 metres (492 ft); or
- List of P600 mountains in the British Isles, for ranking by height and by prominence, of peaks with prominence over 600 metres (1,969 ft)

== Coverage of Simms ==
Despite using the lower threshold for prominence of 30 metres (98 ft), the UIAA threshold for an "independent" peak, one Scottish Munro is missing, namely Maoile Lunndaidh whose official prominence changed to 11 metres (36 ft) in 2014; (Note: 281 of the 282 Scottish Munros have an official OSI prominence above 30 m, except Maoile Lunndaidh, who was found in a 2014 survey to be lower than nearby Creag Toll a' Choin. Thus, Maoile Lunndaidh had its official prominence downgraded from 400 m to just under 11 m, and the 400 m of prominence given to Creag Toll a' Choin. Note that Creag Toll a' Choin had previously been a Munro until older surveys downgraded its status in favour of Maoile Lunndaidh.) (Note: There is no known "composite" list of British Isles mountains that merges the Munro definition with other defined lists; the closest defined lists that include almost all Munros, are those that reduce the minimum prominence threshold to 30 metres (98 ft).) As of October 2018, the list of 2,754 British Isles Simms contained:

1. 281 of the 282 Munros, and 158 of the 226 Munro Tops;
2. All 222 Corbetts, all 219 Grahams, and all 118 Scottish New Donalds;
3. 872 of the 2,011 British Isles Marilyns;
4. All 524 of the England, Wales, and Ireland Hewitts;
5. 117 of the 541 Lake District Birketts (of which 99 are Wainwrights), that meet the Simms criteria;
6. All 224 of the 407 Irish Arderins with a height above 600.0 m;
7. All of the 120 P600 ("major") mountains in the British Isles;
8. 33 of the 34 England, Wales and Ireland Furths. (Note: 33 of the 34 SMC Furths have a prominence above 30 metres (98 feet), however, Caher West Top in Ireland, has a prominence of 24 metres (79 feet).)

== Simms by height by prominence ==
This list was downloaded from the DoBIH in October 2018, and includes all British and Irish peaks with a prominence below 30 metres (98 ft). Note that topographical prominence is complex to measure and requires a survey of the entire contours of a peak, rather than a single point of height. These tables are therefore subject to being revised over time, and should not be amended or updated unless the entire DoBIH data is re-downloaded again. The default table ranking is by height, so where the table is sorted by for example Region, the table will list the mountains within each Region by order of height.

Regional Top: The highest mountain in England, Wales, Scotland, Ireland, or the Isle of Man

== Lists of mountains ==
- List of mountains of the British Isles by height (1–500)
- List of mountains of the British Isles by height (501–1000)
- List of mountains of the British Isles by height (1001–1500)
- List of mountains of the British Isles by height (1501–2000)
- List of mountains of the British Isles by height (2001–2500)
- List of mountains of the British Isles by height (2501–3000)

Britain and Ireland mountains ranked by height and by prominence, Simms classification (DoBIH, October 2018)
| Height Total | Prom. Total | Region | Height Region | Prom. Region | Name | Height (m) | Prom. (m) | Height (ft) | Prom. (ft) | Map Sec. | Topo Map | OS Grid Reference | Classification (§ DoBIH codes) |
|---|---|---|---|---|---|---|---|---|---|---|---|---|---|
| 501 | 191 | Scotland | 467 | 134 | Leum Uilleim | 906 | 496 | 2,974 | 1,627 | 04A | 41 | [56.738551880038;-4.7318980269481 NN330641] | Ma,C,Sim |
| 502 | 141 | Scotland | 468 | 96 | Beinn Dearg Mor | 906 | 564 | 2,973 | 1,850 | 14A | 19 | [57.765460456737;-5.3101933159136 NH032799] | Ma,C,Sim |
| 503 | 2564 | Scotland | 469 | 2027 | Aonach Eagach East Top | 906 | 33 | 2,973 | 109 | 03A | 41 | [56.679028418565;-5.013339780211 NN155582] | Sim |
| 504 | 1385 | Scotland | 470 | 1067 | Stob Creagach | 906 | 88 | 2,972 | 289 | 01C | 51 | [56.375008305769;-4.4968676875841 NN459231] | Sim |
| 505 | 1074 | Scotland | 471 | 822 | Sgurr Thionail | 906 | 120 | 2,972 | 394 | 10A | 33 | [57.126663672356;-5.3322630092143 NG984089] | Hu,Sim |
| 506 | 1593 | Scotland | 472 | 1236 | Beinn Sgritheall East Top | 906 | 72 | 2,972 | 236 | 10A | 33 | [57.150841505373;-5.5643486054412 NG845123] | Sim |
| 507 | 2624 | Scotland | 473 | 2076 | An Socach North Top | 906 | 32 | 2,972 | 105 | 11A | 25 33 | [57.261370152331;-5.1636151311098 NH093234] | Sim |
| 508 | 1323 | Scotland | 474 | 1016 | Meall Coire Lochain | 906 | 93 | 2,971 | 305 | 10C | 34 | [56.984602532918;-4.9392248926026 NN215920] | Sim,sHu |
| 509 | 1338 | Scotland | 475 | 1029 | Creag an Duine | 905 | 91 | 2,969 | 299 | 15A | 20 | [57.848035795889;-4.8727569861032 NH296879] | Sim,sHu |
| 510 | 1796 | Scotland | 476 | 1401 | Seana Bhraigh South Top | 905 | 61 | 2,969 | 200 | 15A | 20 | [57.840553664446;-4.8856422884116 NH288871] | Sim |
| 511 | 75 | Wales | 16 | 4 | Aran Fawddwy | 905 | 670 | 2,969 | 2,198 | 30E | 124 125 | [52.786238409422;-3.6888481456267 SH862223] | Ma,Sim,Hew,N,CoH |
| 512 | 1667 | Scotland | 477 | 1295 | Finalty Hill | 905 | 68 | 2,969 | 223 | 07A | 44 | [56.859707174953;-3.2939324685352 NO212750] | Sim |
| 513 | 2625 | Scotland | 478 | 2077 | Aonach Eagach West Top | 905 | 32 | 2,968 | 105 | 03A | 41 | [56.678949443841;-5.0165994037997 NN153582] | Sim |
| 514 | 1383 | Scotland | 479 | 1065 | Meall nan Each | 904 | 88 | 2,967 | 289 | 03C | 50 | [56.433719666776;-5.1545126935462 NN056313] | Sim |
| 515 | 2226 | Scotland | 480 | 1746 | Meall na Aighean East Top | 904 | 42 | 2,966 | 138 | 02A | 51 52 | [56.619431712018;-4.1103730617354 NN706495] | Sim |
| 516 | 340 | Scotland | 481 | 248 | Ben Tee | 904 | 356 | 2,966 | 1,168 | 10C | 34 | [57.032214332344;-4.9017757445882 NN240972] | Ma,C,Sim |
| 517 | 2626 | Scotland | 482 | 2078 | The Fara South Top | 904 | 32 | 2,966 | 105 | 04B | 42 | [56.916042664178;-4.3094516613506 NN595829] | Sim |
| 518 | 2489 | Scotland | 483 | 1965 | Raeburn's Buttress | 903 | 35 | 2,964 | 115 | 13B | 25 | [57.499665783715;-5.4012830878108 NG963506] | Sim |
| 519 | 353 | Scotland | 484 | 258 | Ben Vuirich | 903 | 345 | 2,963 | 1,132 | 06B | 43 | [56.810658422222;-3.6444128722556 NN997700] | Ma,C,Sim |
| 520 | 176 | Scotland | 485 | 121 | Beinn Damh | 903 | 518 | 2,963 | 1,699 | 13B | 24 | [57.492832775075;-5.5191814699209 NG892502] | Ma,C,Sim |
| 521 | 1537 | Scotland | 486 | 1193 | Beinn Bhuidhe East Top | 903 | 77 | 2,963 | 252 | 01D | 50 56 | [56.332256060862;-4.8920858556273 NN213193] | Sim |
| 522 | 881 | England | 8 | 57 | Bowfell | 903 | 148 | 2,962 | 486 | 34B | 89 90 | [54.447350626638;-3.1673618486661 NY244064] | Hu,Sim,Hew,N,sMa,W,B,Sy,Fel |
| 523 | 1758 | Scotland | 487 | 1371 | Ceann Garbh | 902 | 63 | 2,959 | 207 | 16B | 9 | [58.418259147157;-4.8916730503072 NC312514] | Sim |
| 524 | 902 | Scotland | 488 | 679 | Beinn a' Chumhainn | 902 | 145 | 2,959 | 477 | 04B | 42 | [56.805018806799;-4.5204873979325 NN462710] | Hu,Sim,sMa,xC |
| 525 | 951 | Scotland | 489 | 718 | A' Chailleach | 902 | 138 | 2,959 | 452 | 03A | 41 | [56.677666435845;-4.9577125224722 NN189579] | Hu,Sim |
| 526 | 1493 | Scotland | 490 | 1156 | Sgurr na Conbhaire | 902 | 80 | 2,959 | 262 | 12A | 25 | [57.439304549043;-5.2006417066216 NH080433] | Sim |
| 527 | 2660 | Scotland | 491 | 2108 | Sgurr Coire na Feinne | 902 | 31 | 2,959 | 103 | 10A | 33 | [57.132116926473;-5.261670889445 NH027093] | Sim |
| 528 | 93 | Scotland | 492 | 68 | Beinn an Lochain | 902 | 640 | 2,958 | 2,100 | 19C | 56 | [56.229256006033;-4.8762467151814 NN218078] | Ma,C,Sim,xMT |
| 529 | 731 | Scotland | 493 | 550 | Sgurr an Fhuarain | 901 | 183 | 2,956 | 600 | 10B | 33 40 | [57.028147205189;-5.3184872397 NM987979] | Ma,C,Sim |
| 530 | 1641 | Scotland | 494 | 1273 | Leacann na Sguabaich | 901 | 70 | 2,956 | 230 | 04B | 42 | [56.906792826344;-4.3236631654131 NN586819] | Sim |
| 531 | 2490 | Scotland | 495 | 1966 | Meall a' Choire Ghlais | 901 | 35 | 2,956 | 115 | 10C | 34 | [57.017951184469;-4.9352667298611 NN219957] | Sim |
| 532 | 231 | Scotland | 496 | 166 | Beinn Odhar | 901 | 457 | 2,956 | 1,499 | 02B | 50 | [56.466897799073;-4.7009801406537 NN337338] | Ma,C,Sim |
| 533 | 811 | Scotland | 497 | 611 | Beinn Mheadhonach | 901 | 165 | 2,955 | 540 | 06A | 43 | [56.860962075074;-3.8385344581613 NN880759] | Ma,C,Sim |
| 534 | 2726 | Scotland | 498 | 2168 | Sgurr a' Bhasteir | 900 | 30 | 2,953 | 99 | 17B | 32 | [57.251441837855;-6.2061021182181 NG464257] | Sim |
| 535 | 406 | Scotland | 499 | 299 | Culardoch | 900 | 312 | 2,953 | 1,024 | 08B | 36 43 | [57.073124756529;-3.3326945547468 NO193988] | Ma,C,Sim |
| 536 | 2145 | Scotland | 500 | 1679 | Meall Tionail | 900 | 45 | 2,952 | 148 | 06A | 43 | [56.941137747079;-3.824397080095 NN891848] | Sim |
| 537 | 213 | Scotland | 501 | 152 | Aonach Buidhe | 899 | 474 | 2,949 | 1,555 | 12B | 25 | [57.340571567003;-5.2302747000912 NH057324] | Ma,C,Sim |
| 538 | 1117 | Scotland | 502 | 857 | Am Bathaich | 899 | 114 | 2,949 | 374 | 10A | 33 | [57.114283852618;-5.3245410053831 NG988075] | Hu,Sim,xMT |
| 539 | 263 | England | 9 | 11 | Great Gable | 899 | 425 | 2,949 | 1,394 | 34B | 89 90 | [54.48188941759;-3.2192813842605 NY211103] | Ma,Sim,Hew,N,W,B,Sy,Fel |
| 540 | 1099 | Scotland | 503 | 839 | Beinn a' Chait | 899 | 117 | 2,948 | 383 | 06A | 43 | [56.850696590433;-3.8642689688206 NN864748] | Hu,Sim |
| 541 | 108 | Scotland | 504 | 78 | Sgurr nan Eugallt | 898 | 612 | 2,946 | 2,008 | 10B | 33 | [57.087363837194;-5.4228487116223 NG927048] | Ma,C,Sim |
| 542 | 1182 | Scotland | 505 | 903 | Bogha-cloiche | 898 | 107 | 2,946 | 351 | 05B | 42 | [56.954329023766;-4.0733569406858 NN740867] | Hu,Sim |
| 543 | 1475 | Scotland | 506 | 1140 | Streap Comhlaidh | 898 | 80 | 2,946 | 262 | 10D | 40 | [56.919891323848;-5.366393019037 NM952860] | Sim |
| 544 | 852 | Wales | 17 | 54 | Y Lliwedd | 898 | 154 | 2,946 | 505 | 30B | 115 | [53.059130142565;-4.0576570631475 SH622533] | Ma,Sim,Hew,N |
| 545 | 2126 | Scotland | 507 | 1666 | Meall Cruaidh | 897 | 46 | 2,943 | 151 | 04B | 42 | [56.896674516416;-4.3361713728401 NN578808] | Sim |
| 546 | 788 | Scotland | 508 | 592 | Beinn a' Bhuiridh | 897 | 169 | 2,943 | 554 | 03C | 50 | [56.40835703829;-5.0907986269505 NN094283] | Ma,C,Sim |
| 547 | 20 | Scotland | 509 | 16 | Beinn Bhan | 896 | 851 | 2,940 | 2,792 | 13B | 24 | [57.441993477269;-5.6626800699201 NG803450] | Ma,C,Sim |
| 548 | 632 | Scotland | 510 | 476 | Gairbeinn | 896 | 211 | 2,940 | 692 | 09B | 34 | [57.051752668974;-4.5404879333819 NN460985] | Ma,C,Sim |
| 549 | 737 | Scotland | 511 | 556 | Ruadh-stac Beag | 896 | 181 | 2,940 | 594 | 13A | 19 | [57.596013097333;-5.3952155559183 NG972613] | Ma,C,Sim |
| 550 | 1272 | Scotland | 512 | 975 | Sgurr Beag | 896 | 97 | 2,940 | 318 | 10A | 33 | [57.145168019633;-5.3124300777831 NG997109] | Sim,sHu |
| 551 | 549 | Scotland | 513 | 409 | Ben Tirran | 896 | 244 | 2,940 | 801 | 07B | 44 | [56.858570830004;-3.0298500841916 NO373746] | Ma,C,Sim |
| 552 | 1996 | Scotland | 514 | 1559 | Carn Odhar na Criche | 896 | 51 | 2,939 | 168 | 09B | 35 | [57.098466164061;-4.3092330372789 NH602032] | Sim |
| 553 | 2393 | Scotland | 515 | 1885 | Sgurr a' Mhadaidh Far East Top | 896 | 37 | 2,939 | 121 | 17B | 32 | [57.231851228398;-6.2270836669581 NG450236] | Sim |
| 554 | 874 | Scotland | 516 | 660 | Beinn Gharbh | 895 | 150 | 2,937 | 490 | 10D | 40 | [56.931091172158;-5.4825005130882 NM882876] | Hu,Sim,sMa |
| 555 | 799 | Scotland | 517 | 601 | Creag Mhor | 895 | 167 | 2,936 | 548 | 08B | 36 | [57.123519280016;-3.5591482761824 NJ057047] | Ma,C,Sim |
| 556 | 2286 | Scotland | 518 | 1797 | Creag Mainnrichean | 895 | 40 | 2,936 | 131 | 13B | 25 | [57.483884422258;-5.3864620096318 NG971488] | Sim |
| 557 | 1075 | Scotland | 519 | 823 | Gars-bheinn | 894 | 120 | 2,934 | 394 | 17B | 32 | [57.188951665875;-6.1923598170402 NG468187] | Hu,Sim |
| 558 | 1359 | Scotland | 520 | 1046 | Meall Tionail | 894 | 90 | 2,933 | 295 | 02B | 50 | [56.503739559787;-4.6174639551802 NN390377] | Sim,sHu |
| 559 | 1093 | Scotland | 521 | 834 | Carn Creagach | 894 | 117 | 2,933 | 384 | 06B | 43 | [56.928899056964;-3.5313005299448 NO069830] | Hu,Sim |
| 560 | 83 | England | 10 | 4 | Cross Fell | 893 | 651 | 2,930 | 2,136 | 35A | 91 | [54.702742881444;-2.4872261070172 NY687343] | Ma,Sim,Hew,N |
| 561 | 2627 | Scotland | 522 | 2079 | Cnapan Mor | 893 | 32 | 2,930 | 105 | 08A | 43 | [56.996138140339;-3.7480683204152 NN939908] | Sim |
| 562 | 113 | Wales | 18 | 7 | Cadair Idris | 893 | 608 | 2,929 | 1,995 | 30F | 124 | [52.69928464839;-3.9089642319932 SH711130] | Ma,Sim,Hew,N |
| 563 | 2663 | Scotland | 523 | 2111 | Cam-Chreag | 893 | 31 | 2,928 | 103 | 02B | 51 | [56.526984117942;-4.4011645224068 NN524398] | Sim |
| 564 | 166 | Scotland | 524 | 115 | Beinn a' Chuallaich | 892 | 527 | 2,927 | 1,729 | 05A | 42 | [56.728342622945;-4.1524364398381 NN684617] | Ma,C,Sim |
| 565 | 373 | Scotland | 525 | 274 | An Ruadh-stac | 892 | 329 | 2,927 | 1,079 | 13B | 25 | [57.474446817338;-5.4690196296054 NG921480] | Ma,C,Sim |
| 566 | 966 | Scotland | 526 | 732 | Corrieyairack Hill | 892 | 136 | 2,927 | 446 | 09B | 34 | [57.059680272795;-4.592161634752 NN429995] | Hu,Sim,xC |
| 567 | 1214 | Scotland | 527 | 929 | Doire Tana | 892 | 103 | 2,927 | 338 | 11A | 25 | [57.308575735127;-4.9600654626787 NH218281] | Hu,Sim |
| 568 | 1687 | Scotland | 528 | 1311 | A' Chioch | 892 | 67 | 2,927 | 220 | 06A | 42 | [56.93422191903;-3.9834854568713 NN794843] | Sim |
| 569 | 2099 | Scotland | 529 | 1641 | Meall a' Chaorainn Mor | 892 | 47 | 2,927 | 154 | 09C | 34 | [56.996872886443;-4.4988728160505 NN483923] | Sim |
| 570 | 350 | England | 11 | 19 | Pillar | 892 | 348 | 2,927 | 1,142 | 34B | 89 90 | [54.497423327254;-3.2815079793286 NY171121] | Ma,Sim,Hew,N,W,B,Sy,Fel |
| 571 | 1642 | Scotland | 530 | 1274 | Meall nan Tri Tighearnan | 892 | 70 | 2,927 | 230 | 03C | 50 | [56.537783765281;-5.0183717131265 NN145425] | Sim |
| 572 | 2523 | Scotland | 531 | 1995 | Meall Odhar Mor | 892 | 34 | 2,925 | 113 | 05B | 42 | [56.895231806656;-4.1669552048554 NN681803] | Sim |
| 573 | 1668 | Scotland | 532 | 1296 | Sgurr Coire nan Eiricheallach | 891 | 68 | 2,923 | 223 | 10A | 33 | [57.102208449603;-5.3052892542716 NG999061] | Sim |
| 574 | 573 | Scotland | 533 | 427 | Beinn Enaiglair | 890 | 234 | 2,920 | 768 | 15A | 20 | [57.778896679424;-4.9867053603953 NH225805] | Ma,C,Sim |
| 575 | 913 | Scotland | 534 | 689 | Sgurr Beag | 890 | 143 | 2,920 | 469 | 10B | 33 40 | [57.018846214903;-5.3638037956094 NM959970] | Hu,Sim,sMa |
| 576 | 1010 | Scotland | 535 | 766 | Sgurr na Muice | 890 | 129 | 2,920 | 423 | 12A | 25 | [57.431786804966;-4.9566834613202 NH226418] | Hu,Sim |
| 577 | 1759 | England | 12 | 118 | Catstye Cam | 890 | 63 | 2,920 | 207 | 34C | 90 | [54.533257685905;-3.0090882807926 NY348158] | Sim,Hew,N,W,B,Sy,Fel |
| 578 | 1999 | Scotland | 536 | 1561 | Meall Odhar | 890 | 51 | 2,920 | 167 | 03C | 50 | [56.57382446001;-4.9398243875592 NN195463] | Sim |
| 579 | 1869 | Scotland | 537 | 1455 | Carn Crom | 890 | 57 | 2,920 | 187 | 08A | 36 43 | [57.038400992088;-3.611614017062 NO023953] | Sim |
| 580 | 2483 | Scotland | 538 | 1960 | Aonach Dubh | 890 | 35 | 2,920 | 115 | 03B | 41 | [56.657260366111;-5.0213934916209 NN149558] | Sim |
| 581 | 2199 | Scotland | 539 | 1725 | Geal Charn | 890 | 43 | 2,919 | 141 | 09B | 35 | [57.099527268667;-4.2003309585584 NH668031] | Sim |
| 582 | 1509 | Scotland | 540 | 1170 | Stuc Loch na Cabhaig | 889 | 78 | 2,917 | 256 | 13A | 19 24 | [57.594992104289;-5.530729713049 NG891616] | Sim |
| 583 | 233 | Scotland | 541 | 168 | Creagan na Beinne | 888 | 455 | 2,913 | 1,493 | 01A | 51 52 | [56.50644403475;-4.0423364398015 NN744368] | Ma,C,Sim |
| 584 | 2177 | Scotland | 542 | 1705 | Creag an Fheadain | 888 | 44 | 2,913 | 144 | 02A | 51 | [56.574597239988;-4.44814283475 NN497452] | Sim |
| 585 | 17 | Scotland | 543 | 13 | Sgurr Dhomhnuill | 888 | 873 | 2,913 | 2,864 | 18B | 40 | [56.753863492657;-5.4546073577413 NM889678] | Ma,C,Sim |
| 586 | 562 | Scotland | 544 | 418 | Aonach Shasuinn | 888 | 237 | 2,913 | 778 | 11B | 34 | [57.216196998751;-5.0272078496595 NH173180] | Ma,C,Sim |
| 587 | 1273 | Scotland | 545 | 976 | Sean Mheall | 888 | 97 | 2,913 | 318 | 10C | 34 | [57.008964190849;-4.8966688617214 NN242946] | Sim,sHu |
| 588 | 937 | Scotland | 546 | 709 | Beinn Chorranach | 888 | 140 | 2,913 | 459 | 01D | 56 | [56.245846546558;-4.8193742749774 NN254095] | Hu,Sim,sMa |
| 589 | 2525 | Scotland | 547 | 1997 | Elrig 'ic an Toisich | 887 | 34 | 2,910 | 112 | 06A | 43 | [56.886635675147;-3.8644173203693 NN865788] | Sim |
| 590 | 270 | Scotland | 548 | 201 | Meall a' Ghiubhais | 887 | 418 | 2,910 | 1,371 | 13A | 19 | [57.615022505747;-5.3902899528741 NG976634] | Ma,C,Sim |
| 591 | 532 | Scotland | 549 | 392 | Ben Aden | 887 | 251 | 2,910 | 823 | 10B | 33 40 | [57.030501079103;-5.4637763001326 NM899986] | Ma,C,Sim |
| 592 | 1285 | Scotland | 550 | 985 | Stob Coire nan Cearc | 887 | 96 | 2,910 | 315 | 10D | 40 | [56.912051757614;-5.3903373592067 NM937852] | Sim,sHu |
| 593 | 1623 | Scotland | 551 | 1261 | Beinn Liath Mhor East Top | 887 | 71 | 2,910 | 233 | 13B | 25 | [57.51091909323;-5.3839582902706 NG974518] | Sim |
| 594 | 2075 | Scotland | 552 | 1622 | Beinn Sgiath | 887 | 48 | 2,910 | 157 | 09B | 35 | [57.051583193543;-4.3656825822919 NN566981] | Sim |
| 595 | 1059 | Scotland | 553 | 809 | Braid Cairn | 887 | 122 | 2,910 | 400 | 07B | 44 | [56.972432058625;-2.9458069200992 NO426872] | Hu,Sim |
| 596 | 992 | Scotland | 554 | 752 | Sgor Mor | 887 | 132 | 2,910 | 433 | 06B | 43 | [56.925311576636;-3.4555739271502 NO115825] | Hu,Sim,xC |
| 597 | 72 | Wales | 19 | 3 | Pen y Fan | 886 | 672 | 2,907 | 2,205 | 32A | 160 | [51.88327678038;-3.4368420968811 SO012215] | Ma,Sim,Hew,N,CoH,CoU,CoA |
| 598 | 220 | Scotland | 555 | 158 | Beinn a' Chaisteil | 886 | 467 | 2,907 | 1,532 | 02B | 50 | [56.490582340473;-4.6864173652408 NN347364] | Ma,C,Sim |
| 599 | 1753 | Scotland | 556 | 1366 | Creag a' Choire Ghranda | 886 | 63 | 2,906 | 207 | 15A | 20 | [57.775119206963;-4.917424283464 NH266799] | Sim |
| 600 | 815 | Scotland | 557 | 614 | Buidhe Bheinn | 886 | 160 | 2,905 | 525 | 10A | 33 | [57.126634635228;-5.3669707629897 NG963090] | Ma,C,Sim |
| 601 | 1064 | Scotland | 558 | 813 | Sgurr a' Bhac Chaolais | 885 | 121 | 2,904 | 397 | 10A | 33 | [57.14434764309;-5.376849523859 NG958110] | Hu,Sim,xC |
| 602 | 68 | Scotland | 559 | 53 | Garbh Bheinn | 885 | 687 | 2,904 | 2,254 | 18B | 40 | [56.704322084611;-5.425546217192 NM904622] | Ma,C,Sim |
| 603 | 2024 | Wales | 20 | 119 | Aran Benllyn | 885 | 50 | 2,904 | 164 | 30E | 124 125 | [52.803416330264;-3.6820964659491 SH867242] | Sim,Hew,N |
| 604 | 1132 | England | 13 | 82 | Esk Pike | 885 | 112 | 2,904 | 367 | 34B | 89 90 | [54.457114372646;-3.1799803150068 NY236075] | Hu,Sim,Hew,N,W,B,Sy,Fel |
| 605 | 1408 | Scotland | 560 | 1083 | Meall an Tionail | 885 | 86 | 2,904 | 282 | 07A | 44 | [56.973054692104;-3.2797652725611 NO223876] | Sim |
| 606 | 2709 | Scotland | 561 | 2152 | Braigh nan Creagan Breac | 885 | 31 | 2,903 | 101 | 06A | 43 | [56.860471407569;-3.8106252624971 NN897758] | Sim |
| 607 | 1076 | Scotland | 562 | 824 | Carn Leac | 884 | 120 | 2,900 | 394 | 09B | 34 | [57.042737626239;-4.6289004831031 NN406977] | Hu,Sim |
| 608 | 820 | Scotland | 563 | 617 | Cam Chreag | 884 | 159 | 2,900 | 522 | 02B | 50 | [56.475403235623;-4.6398720260891 NN375346] | Ma,C,Sim |
| 609 | 517 | Scotland | 564 | 379 | The Cobbler | 884 | 256 | 2,900 | 840 | 01D | 56 | [56.2128279588;-4.8088836776774 NN259058] | Ma,C,Sim |
| 610 | 1194 | Scotland | 565 | 913 | Sgiath Chuil East Top | 883 | 106 | 2,898 | 347 | 02B | 51 | [56.466181492156;-4.4768752803696 NN475332] | Hu,Sim |
| 611 | 173 | Scotland | 566 | 120 | Stob Dubh | 883 | 521 | 2,897 | 1,709 | 03C | 50 | [56.59512925036;-4.9887300878975 NN166488] | Ma,C,Sim |
| 612 | 1669 | Scotland | 567 | 1297 | Cnap Coire Loch Tuath | 883 | 68 | 2,897 | 223 | 15A | 20 | [57.800853013626;-4.892569412858 NH282827] | Sim |
| 613 | 1339 | England | 14 | 89 | Raise | 883 | 91 | 2,897 | 299 | 34C | 90 | [54.547556638002;-3.0187169828477 NY342174] | Sim,Hew,N,sHu,W,B,Sy,Fel |
| 614 | 42 | Scotland | 568 | 34 | Rois-Bheinn | 882 | 774 | 2,894 | 2,539 | 18A | 40 | [56.837303225231;-5.6804483413211 NM756778] | Ma,C,Sim |
| 615 | 168 | Scotland | 569 | 116 | Beinn Odhar Bheag | 882 | 524 | 2,894 | 1,719 | 18A | 40 | [56.841561542261;-5.5332265397072 NM846778] | Ma,C,Sim |
| 616 | 1327 | Scotland | 570 | 1019 | A' Mharconaich | 882 | 92 | 2,894 | 302 | 05B | 42 | [56.937287272428;-4.1250118922763 NN708849] | Sim,sHu |
| 617 | 1814 | Scotland | 571 | 1414 | Carn Eiteige | 882 | 60 | 2,894 | 197 | 12A | 25 | [57.442781276008;-4.9859080881833 NH209431] | Sim |
| 618 | 1312 | Scotland | 572 | 1009 | Glas Mheall Beag | 882 | 93 | 2,892 | 306 | 05B | 42 | [56.853709707915;-4.1776744621857 NN673757] | Sim,sHu |
| 619 | 993 | Scotland | 573 | 753 | Sgurr Thuilm | 881 | 132 | 2,890 | 433 | 17B | 32 | [57.236556424832;-6.2475250910886 NG438242] | Hu,Sim |
| 620 | 178 | Scotland | 574 | 123 | Sgurr Mhurlagain | 880 | 515 | 2,887 | 1,690 | 10B | 33 | [56.997841396861;-5.2746084652227 NN012944] | Ma,C,Sim |
| 621 | 243 | Scotland | 575 | 178 | Beinn Chuirn | 880 | 446 | 2,887 | 1,463 | 01D | 50 | [56.423574279812;-4.7903513676163 NN280292] | Ma,C,Sim |
| 622 | 1583 | Scotland | 576 | 1230 | Beinn Eunaich East Top | 880 | 73 | 2,887 | 240 | 03C | 50 | [56.456143078008;-5.0118882660164 NN145334] | Sim |
| 623 | 1443 | Scotland | 577 | 1111 | Braigh Sron Ghorm | 879 | 83 | 2,884 | 272 | 06A | 43 | [56.883061054038;-3.8018700967696 NN903783] | Sim |
| 624 | 165 | Scotland | 578 | 114 | Ben Ledi | 879 | 528 | 2,884 | 1,732 | 01C | 57 | [56.257964514503;-4.3229271264646 NN562097] | Ma,C,Sim |
| 625 | 477 | Scotland | 579 | 350 | Creag Uchdag | 879 | 273 | 2,884 | 896 | 01A | 51 52 | [56.465068255181;-4.0985526567365 NN708323] | Ma,C,Sim |
| 626 | 1476 | Scotland | 580 | 1141 | Meallan Buidhe | 879 | 80 | 2,884 | 262 | 05A | 42 | [56.813297827396;-4.2769097331855 NN611714] | Sim |
| 627 | 132 | Scotland | 581 | 90 | Sgurr a' Mhuilinn | 879 | 580 | 2,884 | 1,903 | 12A | 25 | [57.557951933291;-4.9033682938858 NH264557] | Ma,C,Sim |
| 628 | 273 | Scotland | 582 | 204 | Sguman Coinntich | 879 | 415 | 2,884 | 1,362 | 12B | 25 | [57.318260983018;-5.361230910013 NG977303] | Ma,C,Sim |
| 629 | 1797 | Scotland | 583 | 1402 | Faradh Nighean Fhearchair | 879 | 61 | 2,884 | 200 | 11A | 25 33 | [57.233862604799;-5.3237021706412 NG995208] | Sim |
| 630 | 1870 | Scotland | 584 | 1456 | Buidhe Bheinn West Top | 879 | 57 | 2,884 | 187 | 10A | 33 | [57.123633680935;-5.3782674160867 NG956087] | Sim,xC |
| 631 | 2570 | Scotland | 585 | 2032 | Carn Leac East Top | 879 | 33 | 2,884 | 108 | 09B | 34 | [57.044739447677;-4.6191492922368 NN412979] | Sim |
| 632 | 152 | Scotland | 586 | 104 | Fraochaidh | 879 | 551 | 2,884 | 1,808 | 03B | 41 | [56.615584364032;-5.2136956943906 NN029517] | Ma,C,Sim |
| 633 | 780 | Scotland | 587 | 586 | Carn an Fhreiceadain | 878 | 172 | 2,881 | 564 | 09B | 35 | [57.13705071487;-4.1083565513422 NH725071] | Ma,C,Sim |
| 634 | 2025 | Scotland | 588 | 1584 | Rois-Bheinn West Top | 878 | 50 | 2,881 | 164 | 18A | 40 | [56.836964757147;-5.6918972120753 NM749778] | Sim |
| 635 | 2026 | Scotland | 589 | 1585 | Geal Charn | 878 | 50 | 2,881 | 164 | 06B | 43 | [56.930833786021;-3.5921818793409 NO032833] | Sim |
| 636 | 2670 | Scotland | 590 | 2118 | Sgurr a' Choire-bheithe East Top | 877 | 31 | 2,877 | 102 | 10B | 33 | [57.053860136898;-5.4643037957065 NG900012] | Sim |
| 637 | 1328 | Scotland | 591 | 1020 | Meall Tarsuinn | 877 | 92 | 2,877 | 302 | 03C | 50 | [56.560645876962;-4.9648466209608 NN179449] | Sim,sHu |
| 638 | 2244 | Scotland | 592 | 1762 | Sgurr a' Choire Bhig | 877 | 42 | 2,877 | 137 | 17B | 32 | [57.192369510031;-6.1977171527634 NG465191] | Sim |
| 639 | 1267 | Scotland | 593 | 970 | Geal Charn | 876 | 98 | 2,874 | 322 | 09B | 34 | [57.05390745519;-4.5670216173502 NN444988] | Sim,sHu |
| 640 | 1557 | Scotland | 594 | 1209 | Beinn Liath Mhor Far East Top | 876 | 75 | 2,874 | 246 | 13B | 25 | [57.508630657368;-5.3687147602422 NG983515] | Sim |
| 641 | 1340 | Scotland | 595 | 1030 | Boustie Ley | 876 | 91 | 2,874 | 299 | 07B | 44 | [56.870427570763;-3.1138424876781 NO322760] | Sim,sHu |
| 642 | 2565 | Scotland | 596 | 2028 | Carn na Criche | 876 | 33 | 2,873 | 109 | 09B | 35 | [57.076127342462;-4.3507449600963 NH576008] | Sim |
| 643 | 954 | Scotland | 597 | 721 | Sgurr na Moraich | 876 | 137 | 2,873 | 451 | 11A | 33 | [57.219087911608;-5.3720825649547 NG965193] | Hu,Sim |
| 644 | 245 | Scotland | 598 | 180 | Baosbheinn | 875 | 443 | 2,871 | 1,453 | 13A | 19 24 | [57.628073112147;-5.5691343948645 NG870654] | Ma,C,Sim |
| 645 | 624 | Scotland | 599 | 470 | A' Chaoirnich | 875 | 213 | 2,871 | 699 | 06A | 42 | [56.90032810736;-4.0785734107641 NN735807] | Ma,C,Sim |
| 646 | 1386 | Scotland | 600 | 1068 | Carn Gorm | 875 | 88 | 2,871 | 289 | 12A | 25 | [57.501690651768;-5.1142730065058 NH135500] | Sim |
| 647 | 1812 | Scotland | 601 | 1412 | Sron Gharbh | 875 | 60 | 2,870 | 198 | 03A | 41 | [56.68168582443;-4.9776245335059 NN177584] | Sim |
| 648 | 990 | Scotland | 602 | 750 | Meall Daill | 875 | 132 | 2,870 | 433 | 02A | 51 | [56.555609541638;-4.5868702428871 NN411434] | Hu,Sim |
| 649 | 1523 | Scotland | 603 | 1181 | Beinn a' Bhric | 874 | 77 | 2,868 | 253 | 04A | 41 | [56.738981901646;-4.7531896892647 NN317642] | Sim |
| 650 | 2094 | Scotland | 604 | 1636 | Carn Mor | 874 | 47 | 2,868 | 156 | 06B | 43 | [56.857862312877;-3.4611531658092 NO110750] | Sim |
| 651 | 1360 | Scotland | 605 | 1047 | Meall nan Eun | 874 | 90 | 2,867 | 295 | 02A | 42 51 52 | [56.63202807127;-4.1094459916488 NN707509] | Sim,sHu |
| 652 | 16 | Scotland | 606 | 12 | Goatfell | 874 | 874 | 2,867 | 2,867 | 20C | 62 69 | [55.625456406437;-5.1924919160872 NR991415] | Ma,C,Sim,CoH,CoU,SIB |
| 653 | 774 | Scotland | 607 | 580 | Sgurr na Ba Glaise | 874 | 173 | 2,867 | 568 | 18A | 40 | [56.837080501488;-5.6574623192598 NM770777] | Ma,C,Sim |
| 654 | 1526 | Scotland | 608 | 1184 | Iorguill | 874 | 77 | 2,867 | 253 | 15A | 20 | [57.789276628873;-4.9656864022911 NH238816] | Sim |
| 655 | 115 | Scotland | 609 | 81 | Ben Hee | 873 | 607 | 2,864 | 1,991 | 16B | 16 | [58.2655123068;-4.6848086429668 NC426339] | Ma,C,Sim |
| 656 | 1428 | Scotland | 610 | 1098 | An Eag | 873 | 84 | 2,864 | 276 | 10B | 33 40 | [57.007374975702;-5.3891286105503 NM943958] | Sim |
| 657 | 2628 | Scotland | 611 | 2080 | Creag an Lochain Sgeirich | 873 | 32 | 2,864 | 105 | 15A | 20 | [57.821376752699;-4.9380062489648 NH256851] | Sim |
| 658 | 436 | England | 15 | 24 | Fairfield | 873 | 299 | 2,864 | 981 | 34C | 90 | [54.496544979113;-2.9927431733147 NY358117] | Ma,Sim,Hew,N,W,B,Sy,Fel |
| 659 | 120 | Wales | 21 | 8 | Moel Siabod | 872 | 600 | 2,862 | 1,968 | 30B | 115 | [53.072886301178;-3.9344102917541 SH705546] | Ma,Sim,Hew,N |
| 660 | 1670 | Scotland | 612 | 1298 | Moruisg East Top | 872 | 68 | 2,861 | 223 | 12A | 25 | [57.497108880667;-5.1539496011258 NH111496] | Sim |
| 661 | 1760 | Scotland | 613 | 1372 | Carn nan Coireachan Cruaidh | 872 | 63 | 2,861 | 207 | 11B | 34 | [57.215777020346;-5.0072937034536 NH185179] | Sim |
| 662 | 2394 | Wales | 22 | 137 | Erw y Ddafad-ddu | 872 | 37 | 2,861 | 121 | 30E | 124 125 | [52.795266163707;-3.6862315222074 SH864233] | Sim,Hew,N |
| 663 | 306 | Scotland | 614 | 227 | Morven | 872 | 387 | 2,861 | 1,270 | 21A | 37 | [57.12177764698;-3.0321914062232 NJ376039] | Ma,C,Sim |
| 664 | 2559 | Scotland | 615 | 2022 | Carn Donnachaidh Beag | 872 | 33 | 2,860 | 109 | 09B | 35 | [57.103362455745;-4.3359574526645 NH586038] | Sim |
| 665 | 2093 | Scotland | 616 | 1635 | Carn a' Chiaraidh | 871 | 48 | 2,858 | 156 | 06A | 43 | [56.873484030778;-3.842430982718 NN878773] | Sim |
| 666 | 648 | Scotland | 617 | 488 | Sgorr nan Lochan Uaine | 871 | 206 | 2,858 | 676 | 13B | 25 | [57.522351924281;-5.3933723004808 NG969531] | Ma,C,Sim |
| 667 | 1420 | Scotland | 618 | 1092 | Carn a' Chlarsaich | 871 | 85 | 2,858 | 279 | 06B | 43 | [56.883100292385;-3.5294265906303 NO069779] | Sim |
| 668 | 1387 | Scotland | 619 | 1069 | Sron a' Chaoineidh | 870 | 88 | 2,854 | 289 | 01A | 51 52 | [56.507131172448;-4.000121386496 NN770368] | Sim |
| 669 | 1108 | Scotland | 620 | 848 | Beinn Odhar Mhor | 870 | 115 | 2,854 | 377 | 18A | 40 | [56.853449386338;-5.5261436997091 NM851791] | Hu,Sim |
| 670 | 2200 | Scotland | 621 | 1726 | An Creachal Beag | 870 | 43 | 2,854 | 141 | 12B | 25 | [57.347232243672;-5.215895850649 NH066331] | Sim |
| 671 | 2252 | Scotland | 622 | 1768 | Gairbeinn North Top | 870 | 41 | 2,854 | 135 | 09B | 34 | [57.067342259588;-4.5250563056001 NH470002] | Sim |
| 672 | 2076 | Scotland | 623 | 1623 | The Cobbler North Peak | 870 | 48 | 2,854 | 157 | 01D | 56 | [56.214695824823;-4.8057943131932 NN261060] | Sim |
| 673 | 2395 | Scotland | 624 | 1886 | Green Hill | 870 | 37 | 2,854 | 121 | 07B | 44 | [56.867207875571;-3.0710968347609 NO348756] | Sim |
| 674 | 1043 | Scotland | 625 | 795 | Druim Fiaclach | 870 | 125 | 2,854 | 410 | 18A | 40 | [56.850634949359;-5.6243279683775 NM791791] | Hu,Sim,xC |
| 675 | 2428 | Scotland | 626 | 1913 | Beinn Bhuidhe | 870 | 37 | 2,853 | 120 | 11A | 33 | [57.208504548863;-5.3644901900109 NG969181] | Sim |
| 676 | 208 | Scotland | 627 | 148 | Stob a' Choin | 869 | 480 | 2,851 | 1,575 | 01C | 56 | [56.30899942008;-4.5604654847616 NN417159] | Ma,C,Sim |
| 677 | 1159 | Scotland | 628 | 886 | Bidein Druim nan Ramh | 869 | 109 | 2,851 | 358 | 17B | 32 | [57.234872481546;-6.2174794551316 NG456239] | Hu,Sim |
| 678 | 705 | Scotland | 629 | 530 | Beinn Pharlagain | 868 | 191 | 2,848 | 627 | 04B | 42 | [56.743525822962;-4.5392632503643 NN448642] | Ma,C,Sim |
| 679 | 920 | Scotland | 630 | 696 | Meall a' Choire Bhuidhe | 868 | 142 | 2,848 | 466 | 06B | 43 | [56.820995859987;-3.5383637007247 NO062710] | Hu,Sim,sMa |
| 680 | 586 | Scotland | 631 | 437 | Faochaig | 868 | 230 | 2,848 | 755 | 12B | 25 | [57.332745626017;-5.2894217785049 NH021317] | Ma,C,Sim |
| 681 | 1798 | Scotland | 632 | 1403 | Carn nan Conbhairean | 868 | 61 | 2,848 | 200 | 16E | 15 | [58.121844428224;-4.8455225920745 NC325183] | Sim |
| 682 | 1829 | Scotland | 633 | 1424 | Sgurr a' Chadha Dheirg | 868 | 59 | 2,848 | 194 | 14B | 20 | [57.674065650303;-5.0485287161596 NH183690] | Sim |
| 683 | 227 | England | 16 | 9 | Blencathra | 868 | 461 | 2,848 | 1,512 | 34A | 90 | [54.639853805292;-3.0504635602119 NY323277] | Ma,Sim,Hew,N,W,B,Sy,Fel |
| 684 | 1258 | Scotland | 634 | 962 | A' Chioch | 868 | 99 | 2,847 | 325 | 17E | 47 48 | [56.427318748488;-5.9993112842696 NM535333] | Sim,sHu |
| 685 | 1888 | Scotland | 635 | 1469 | Creagan Dubh Toll nam Biast | 868 | 56 | 2,846 | 185 | 13B | 24 | [57.499725731108;-5.5298647836305 NG886510] | Sim |
| 686 | 151 | Scotland | 636 | 103 | Bidein a' Chabair | 867 | 552 | 2,844 | 1,811 | 10D | 33 40 | [56.979831343403;-5.4755293040904 NM889930] | Ma,C,Sim |
| 687 | 366 | Scotland | 637 | 269 | Garbh Bheinn | 867 | 332 | 2,844 | 1,089 | 03A | 41 | [56.695727419104;-4.9918034406406 NN169600] | Ma,C,Sim |
| 688 | 2351 | Scotland | 638 | 1849 | Aonach Mor | 867 | 38 | 2,844 | 125 | 03C | 50 | [56.589097028133;-4.9019142214642 NN219479] | Sim |
| 689 | 1446 | Scotland | 639 | 1114 | A' Cheir Ghorm | 867 | 82 | 2,843 | 269 | 16B | 9 | [58.400550644417;-4.8799502933502 NC318494] | Sim |
| 690 | 1016 | Scotland | 640 | 770 | Craig Mellon | 866 | 129 | 2,842 | 422 | 07A | 44 | [56.881186970681;-3.2126231582006 NO262773] | Hu,Sim |
| 691 | 2222 | Scotland | 641 | 1742 | Meall na Samhna | 866 | 42 | 2,841 | 139 | 02B | 51 | [56.467530131293;-4.4542330662077 NN489333] | Sim |
| 692 | 1270 | Scotland | 642 | 973 | Meall a' Bhealaich | 865 | 97 | 2,839 | 320 | 04B | 42 | [56.790327573201;-4.5358767315266 NN452694] | Sim,sHu |
| 693 | 1409 | Scotland | 643 | 1084 | An Sgulan | 865 | 86 | 2,838 | 282 | 05A | 42 | [56.819235783263;-4.3444567550073 NN570722] | Sim |
| 694 | 666 | Scotland | 644 | 499 | Carn a' Choire Ghairbh | 865 | 201 | 2,838 | 659 | 11B | 34 | [57.221882185445;-5.0889808046842 NH136188] | Ma,C,Sim |
| 695 | 1799 | England | 17 | 120 | Skiddaw Little Man | 865 | 61 | 2,838 | 200 | 34A | 89 90 | [54.639055569163;-3.1387609573947 NY266277] | Sim,Hew,N,W,B,Sy,Fel |
| 696 | 719 | Scotland | 645 | 540 | Conachcraig | 865 | 187 | 2,838 | 614 | 07A | 44 | [56.96408354336;-3.1873561174365 NO279865] | Ma,C,Sim |
| 697 | 2629 | Scotland | 646 | 2081 | Carn Ait | 865 | 32 | 2,837 | 105 | 07A | 43 | [56.844096036155;-3.4081539874604 NO142734] | Sim |
| 698 | 1238 | Scotland | 647 | 947 | An Grianan | 864 | 101 | 2,835 | 331 | 02A | 51 | [56.553406066785;-4.4744370114206 NN480429] | Hu,Sim |
| 699 | 802 | Scotland | 648 | 604 | Beinn Mhic Chasgaig | 864 | 166 | 2,835 | 545 | 03C | 41 | [56.609809195181;-4.9002439983613 NN221502] | Ma,C,Sim |
| 700 | 1215 | Scotland | 649 | 930 | Na Rathanan | 864 | 103 | 2,835 | 338 | 13A | 19 24 | [57.591458304064;-5.5605205089278 NG873613] | Hu,Sim |
| 701 | 2439 | Scotland | 650 | 1924 | Meall Odhar Loisgte | 864 | 36 | 2,835 | 118 | 06A | 43 | [56.937200689012;-3.9655626351085 NN805846] | Sim |
| 702 | 489 | Scotland | 651 | 361 | Sgurr na Feartaig | 863 | 267 | 2,831 | 876 | 12A | 25 | [57.456177229981;-5.2438087366489 NH055453] | Ma,C,Sim |
| 703 | 598 | Scotland | 652 | 449 | Beinn Tharsuinn | 863 | 226 | 2,831 | 741 | 12A | 25 | [57.438240866354;-5.2422196613653 NH055433] | Ma,C,Sim |
| 704 | 1594 | Scotland | 653 | 1237 | Creag Feusag | 863 | 72 | 2,831 | 236 | 12B | 25 | [57.361503024461;-4.9643293224943 NH218340] | Sim |
| 705 | 2287 | Scotland | 654 | 1798 | Meall Buidhe | 863 | 40 | 2,831 | 131 | 04B | 42 | [56.908931034524;-4.4469959325964 NN511824] | Sim |
| 706 | 1688 | Wales | 23 | 97 | Mynydd Moel | 863 | 67 | 2,831 | 220 | 30F | 124 | [52.705054324018;-3.8855331027541 SH727136] | Sim,Hew,N |
| 707 | 2227 | England | 18 | 150 | White Side | 863 | 42 | 2,831 | 138 | 34C | 90 | [54.540302984363;-3.0262646519992 NY337166] | Sim,Hew,N,W,B,Sy,Fel |
| 708 | 1510 | Scotland | 655 | 1171 | Beinn Sgulaird South Top | 863 | 78 | 2,831 | 256 | 03B | 50 | [56.554237059331;-5.1873291449098 NN042448] | Sim |
| 709 | 633 | Scotland | 656 | 477 | Creag an Dail Bheag | 863 | 211 | 2,831 | 692 | 08B | 36 43 | [57.06619292511;-3.3918179027114 NO157981] | Ma,Sim,C |
| 710 | 1472 | Scotland | 657 | 1138 | Conlach Mhor | 863 | 80 | 2,830 | 264 | 06A | 43 | [56.86932540859;-3.7569110481228 NN930767] | Sim |
| 711 | 803 | Scotland | 658 | 605 | Cam Chreag | 862 | 166 | 2,828 | 545 | 02A | 51 | [56.610836765305;-4.3869300697586 NN536491] | Ma,C,Sim |
| 712 | 558 | Scotland | 659 | 415 | Beinn a' Bhathaich Ard | 862 | 241 | 2,828 | 791 | 12A | 26 | [57.451178489118;-4.7348470257001 NH360434] | Ma,C,Sim |
| 713 | 846 | Scotland | 660 | 638 | Meall na h-Aisre | 862 | 155 | 2,828 | 509 | 09B | 35 | [57.067020287093;-4.4507979019855 NH515000] | Ma,C,Sim |
| 714 | 2396 | Scotland | 661 | 1887 | Toman Coinich | 862 | 37 | 2,828 | 121 | 15A | 20 | [57.815679492846;-4.9122818250128 NH271844] | Sim |
| 715 | 2728 | Scotland | 662 | 2170 | Cathelle Houses | 862 | 30 | 2,828 | 98 | 07B | 44 | [56.872974715633;-3.1303246467598 NO312763] | Sim |
| 716 | 2440 | Scotland | 663 | 1925 | Caisteal na Caillich | 862 | 36 | 2,828 | 118 | 07A | 44 | [56.97219793023;-3.1843243146517 NO281874] | Sim |
| 717 | 1283 | Scotland | 664 | 983 | Na Tuadhan | 861 | 97 | 2,826 | 318 | 16E | 15 | [58.148813573323;-4.8850701742912 NC303214] | Sim,sHu |
| 718 | 2562 | Scotland | 665 | 2025 | Carn Liath | 861 | 33 | 2,826 | 109 | 08B | 36 43 | [57.061830350673;-3.3801113668304 NO164976] | Sim,xC |
| 719 | 2630 | Scotland | 666 | 2082 | Meall nam Fiadh | 861 | 32 | 2,825 | 105 | 04B | 42 | [56.751559863288;-4.5856100260844 NN420652] | Sim |
| 720 | 259 | Scotland | 667 | 193 | Caisteal Abhail | 859 | 427 | 2,818 | 1,401 | 20C | 62 69 | [55.649661382563;-5.2294409426002 NR969443] | Ma,C,Sim |
| 721 | 1301 | Scotland | 668 | 1000 | Glas-leathad Feshie | 859 | 94 | 2,818 | 308 | 06A | 43 | [56.931906655154;-3.9011884738861 NN844839] | Sim,sHu |
| 722 | 234 | Scotland | 669 | 169 | Beinn Lair | 859 | 455 | 2,818 | 1,493 | 14A | 19 | [57.703119038371;-5.3901315611047 NG981732] | Ma,C,Sim |
| 723 | 1895 | Scotland | 670 | 1475 | Sgurr na h-Aide | 859 | 56 | 2,818 | 184 | 10D | 33 40 | [56.980361983919;-5.4887505465058 NM881931] | Sim |
| 724 | 941 | England | 19 | 65 | Crinkle Crags (Long Top) | 859 | 139 | 2,818 | 456 | 34B | 89 90 | [54.433033838981;-3.1607880045968 NY248048] | Hu,Sim,Hew,N,W,B,Sy,Fel |
| 725 | 847 | Scotland | 671 | 639 | Morrone | 859 | 155 | 2,818 | 509 | 06B | 43 | [56.980414602051;-3.4297511902973 NO132886] | Ma,C,Sim |
| 726 | 1624 | Scotland | 672 | 1262 | Carn Dallaig | 858 | 71 | 2,815 | 233 | 06B | 43 | [56.85598518427;-3.6136006938475 NO017750] | Sim |
| 727 | 1958 | Scotland | 673 | 1525 | Glas Tulaichean North Top | 858 | 53 | 2,815 | 174 | 06B | 43 | [56.879326597671;-3.5440416986686 NO060775] | Sim |
| 728 | 2201 | Scotland | 674 | 1727 | Meall nan Eanchainn | 858 | 43 | 2,815 | 141 | 01A | 51 52 | [56.50667484128;-3.9724715956785 NN787367] | Sim |
| 729 | 287 | Scotland | 675 | 214 | Fraoch Bheinn | 858 | 400 | 2,815 | 1,312 | 10B | 33 40 | [56.993127856844;-5.317013582561 NM986940] | Ma,C,Sim |
| 730 | 1122 | Scotland | 676 | 861 | Meall Glac an Ruighe | 858 | 113 | 2,815 | 371 | 15A | 20 | [57.830696919657;-4.9236025816138 NH265861] | Hu,Sim |
| 731 | 2571 | Scotland | 677 | 2033 | Ladhar Bheinn Far South Top | 858 | 33 | 2,815 | 108 | 10B | 33 | [57.069540190815;-5.5779972316145 NG832033] | Sim |
| 732 | 2027 | England | 20 | 134 | Dollywaggon Pike | 858 | 50 | 2,815 | 164 | 34C | 90 | [54.508072554468;-3.0115562633407 NY346130] | Sim,Hew,N,W,B,Sy,Fel |
| 733 | 732 | Scotland | 678 | 551 | Beinn Luibhean | 858 | 183 | 2,815 | 600 | 01D | 56 | [56.23104680727;-4.8376510978871 NN242079] | Ma,C,Sim |
| 734 | 2631 | Scotland | 679 | 2083 | The Cobbler South Peak | 858 | 32 | 2,815 | 105 | 01D | 56 | [56.211967186258;-4.8072077705755 NN260057] | Sim |
| 735 | 223 | Scotland | 680 | 161 | Beinn a' Chrulaiste | 857 | 464 | 2,812 | 1,522 | 03A | 41 | [56.668175662394;-4.8639192526442 NN246566] | Ma,C,Sim |
| 736 | 418 | Scotland | 681 | 310 | Cruach Innse | 857 | 306 | 2,812 | 1,004 | 04A | 41 | [56.846164141513;-4.8233848996147 NN279763] | Ma,C,Sim |
| 737 | 448 | Scotland | 682 | 331 | Carn Dearg Mor | 857 | 292 | 2,812 | 958 | 06A | 35 43 | [56.996019904486;-3.9390301020113 NN823911] | Ma,C,Sim |
| 738 | 2572 | Scotland | 683 | 2034 | Garbh-bheinn | 857 | 33 | 2,812 | 108 | 04B | 41 | [56.803259067244;-4.6907364692943 NN358712] | Sim |
| 739 | 2729 | Scotland | 684 | 2171 | Sron a' Bhuirich | 857 | 30 | 2,812 | 98 | 09B | 34 | [57.044185466569;-4.6026227626748 NN422978] | Sim |
| 740 | 1160 | England | 21 | 85 | Great Dodd | 857 | 109 | 2,812 | 358 | 34C | 90 | [54.575411331271;-3.0194117976997 NY342205] | Hu,Sim,Hew,N,W,B,Sy,Fel |
| 741 | 2245 | Scotland | 685 | 1763 | Stob Coire Bhuidhe | 857 | 42 | 2,811 | 137 | 01C | 51 | [56.370659732531;-4.5775574113414 NN409228] | Sim |
| 742 | 354 | Scotland | 686 | 259 | Beinn a' Chaisgein Mor | 856 | 345 | 2,808 | 1,132 | 14A | 19 | [57.750686073052;-5.3929068795124 NG982785] | Ma,C,Sim |
| 743 | 1329 | Scotland | 687 | 1021 | Creag Ghlas | 856 | 92 | 2,808 | 302 | 11A | 25 33 | [57.285437289981;-5.242037231366 NH047263] | Sim,sHu |
| 744 | 2671 | Scotland | 688 | 2119 | Carn nan Searrach | 856 | 31 | 2,808 | 102 | 12B | 25 | [57.336881682292;-5.3030901791603 NH013322] | Sim |
| 745 | 587 | Scotland | 689 | 438 | Stob an Aonaich Mhoir | 855 | 230 | 2,805 | 755 | 05A | 42 | [56.793077237784;-4.3968637432227 NN537694] | Ma,C,Sim |
| 746 | 254 | Scotland | 690 | 188 | Beinn an Eoin | 855 | 434 | 2,805 | 1,424 | 13A | 19 | [57.622540332335;-5.5099479896559 NG905646] | Ma,C,Sim |
| 747 | 414 | Scotland | 691 | 306 | Beinn Bhuidhe | 855 | 308 | 2,805 | 1,010 | 10B | 33 40 | [57.009849006218;-5.590382999034 NM821967] | Ma,C,Sim |
| 748 | 1730 | Scotland | 692 | 1347 | Sgurr a' Phollain | 855 | 65 | 2,805 | 213 | 12A | 26 | [57.463095001996;-4.7240639704814 NH367447] | Sim |
| 749 | 1222 | Scotland | 693 | 935 | Bruthach nan Creagan | 855 | 102 | 2,803 | 335 | 06A | 42 | [56.898939651199;-4.0538650203033 NN750805] | Hu,Sim |
| 750 | 1197 | Scotland | 694 | 916 | Garbh-charn | 854 | 105 | 2,802 | 344 | 12A | 25 | [57.427139207051;-4.8463443488605 NH292410] | Hu,Sim |
| 751 | 1930 | Scotland | 695 | 1503 | Sgurr an Fhuarail South Top | 854 | 54 | 2,802 | 177 | 11A | 33 | [57.167646020106;-5.2085447883733 NH061131] | Sim |
| 752 | 209 | Wales | 24 | 12 | Arenig Fawr | 854 | 479 | 2,802 | 1,572 | 30D | 124 125 | [52.916672777821;-3.7459777645165 SH827369] | Ma,Sim,Hew,N |
| 753 | 2730 | Ireland | 13 | 222 | Knockbrinnea (W) | 854 | 30 | 2,802 | 98 | 50C | 78 | [52.011910274658;-9.7382822473992 V807858] | Sim,Hew,Dil,VL |
| 754 | 1815 | Scotland | 696 | 1415 | Sron Gharbh | 853 | 60 | 2,799 | 197 | 06A | 43 | [56.917014557282;-3.8150057497336 NN896821] | Sim |
| 755 | 48 | Scotland | 697 | 39 | Creach Bheinn | 853 | 755 | 2,799 | 2,477 | 18C | 49 | [56.661535438536;-5.4771642762438 NM870576] | Ma,C,Sim |
| 756 | 1302 | Scotland | 698 | 1001 | Creag Dhubh Mhor | 853 | 94 | 2,799 | 308 | 12A | 25 | [57.477637996569;-5.1055499052146 NH139473] | Sim,sHu |
| 757 | 1705 | Scotland | 699 | 1326 | Carn a' Bhothain Mholaich | 853 | 66 | 2,799 | 217 | 09B | 35 | [57.132900408772;-4.1411696920668 NH705067] | Sim |
| 758 | 2731 | Scotland | 700 | 2172 | Creag an Fhuathais | 853 | 30 | 2,799 | 98 | 06B | 43 | [56.929492971466;-3.4820281799193 NO099830] | Sim |
| 759 | 2520 | Scotland | 701 | 1992 | Stac a' Chuirn | 852 | 35 | 2,797 | 115 | 01D | 50 56 | [56.319718509929;-4.9283401589958 NN190180] | Sim |
| 760 | 260 | Scotland | 702 | 194 | Meall an t-Seallaidh | 852 | 427 | 2,795 | 1,401 | 01C | 51 | [56.380333916224;-4.362769095713 NN542234] | Ma,C,Sim |
| 761 | 1109 | Scotland | 703 | 849 | Creag nan Eun | 852 | 115 | 2,795 | 377 | 01A | 51 52 | [56.461096450396;-4.0674939665459 NN727318] | Hu,Sim |
| 762 | 2100 | Scotland | 704 | 1642 | Sgurr a' Choire Riabhaich | 852 | 47 | 2,795 | 154 | 10D | 40 | [56.927744220006;-5.4410850556082 NM907871] | Sim |
| 763 | 175 | England | 22 | 7 | Grasmoor | 852 | 519 | 2,795 | 1,703 | 34B | 89 90 | [54.571146142533;-3.2791796260363 NY174203] | Ma,Sim,Hew,N,W,B,Sy,Fel |
| 764 | 1403 | Scotland | 705 | 1080 | Ben Hee North Top | 851 | 87 | 2,792 | 285 | 16B | 16 | [58.275666656995;-4.6719319839537 NC434350] | Sim |
| 765 | 1830 | Scotland | 706 | 1425 | Moruisg Far East Top | 851 | 59 | 2,792 | 194 | 12A | 25 | [57.496586242051;-5.1388794501325 NH120495] | Sim |
| 766 | 92 | Ireland | 14 | 16 | Baurtregaum | 851 | 642 | 2,792 | 2,106 | 49B | 71 | [52.206448424897;-9.8307142959507 Q749076] | Ma,Sim,Hew,Dil,A,VL |
| 767 | 28 | Northern Ireland | 15 | 4 | Slieve Donard | 850 | 825 | 2,789 | 2,707 | 43B | 29 | [54.179435166637;-5.9208331709454 J358276] | Ma,Sim,Hew,Dil,A, VL,CoH,CoU |
| 768 | 903 | Scotland | 707 | 680 | Hill of Strone | 850 | 145 | 2,789 | 476 | 07A | 44 | [56.842074961927;-3.168736048687 NO288729] | Hu,Sim,sMa |
| 769 | 1354 | Scotland | 708 | 1041 | Meall Garbh | 849 | 90 | 2,786 | 297 | 14A | 19 | [57.700740696605;-5.2757385340126 NH049726] | Sim,sHu |
| 770 | 727 | Scotland | 709 | 548 | Beinn nan Imirean | 849 | 185 | 2,785 | 607 | 02B | 51 | [56.443693282885;-4.5662761889316 NN419309] | Ma,C,Sim |
| 771 | 84 | Scotland | 710 | 63 | Cul Mor | 849 | 651 | 2,785 | 2,136 | 16F | 15 | [58.057975589738;-5.1168017732164 NC162119] | Ma,C,Sim |
| 772 | 106 | Scotland | 711 | 76 | Sgurr Ghiubhsachain | 849 | 614 | 2,785 | 2,014 | 18B | 40 | [56.818686250936;-5.4835286597454 NM875751] | Ma,C,Sim |
| 773 | 362 | Scotland | 712 | 265 | Bac an Eich | 849 | 334 | 2,785 | 1,096 | 12A | 25 | [57.495321065785;-4.9684992167218 NH222489] | Ma,C,Sim |
| 774 | 908 | Scotland | 713 | 684 | Aonach Sgoilte | 849 | 144 | 2,785 | 472 | 10B | 33 | [57.064536523431;-5.5643130380376 NG840027] | Hu,Sim,sMa |
| 775 | 1584 | Wales | 25 | 92 | Llwytmor | 849 | 73 | 2,785 | 240 | 30B | 115 | [53.203657520077;-3.9642539274759 SH689692] | Sim,Hew,N |
| 776 | 322 | Ireland | 16 | 49 | Mullaghcleevaun | 849 | 373 | 2,785 | 1,224 | 55B | 56 | [53.103198304578;-6.4076511303542 O067070] | Ma,Sim,Hew,Dil,A,VL |
| 777 | 1101 | Scotland | 714 | 841 | Meall an t-Slugain | 849 | 116 | 2,785 | 381 | 07A | 43 | [56.960707045119;-3.3434789801208 NO184863] | Hu,Sim |
| 778 | 919 | Scotland | 715 | 695 | Carn an Fhidhleir Lorgaidh | 849 | 142 | 2,784 | 466 | 06A | 43 | [56.963629411831;-3.8830661002728 NN856874] | Hu,Sim,sMa |
| 779 | 914 | Scotland | 716 | 690 | Sgurr a' Choire-rainich | 848 | 143 | 2,782 | 469 | 12A | 25 | [57.568060708441;-4.9326073877947 NH247569] | Hu,Sim,sMa |
| 780 | 1388 | Scotland | 717 | 1070 | Creag Dhubh | 848 | 88 | 2,782 | 289 | 08A | 36 | [57.115682161683;-3.8081982903612 NH906042] | Sim |
| 781 | 1389 | Scotland | 718 | 1071 | Creag a' Bhanain | 848 | 88 | 2,782 | 289 | 09C | 34 | [56.983503097021;-4.5819239758727 NN432910] | Sim |
| 782 | 1541 | England | 23 | 101 | Great Dun Fell | 848 | 76 | 2,782 | 249 | 35A | 91 | [54.683111226117;-2.4513169347903 NY710321] | Sim,Hew,N |
| 783 | 1188 | Scotland | 719 | 909 | A' Chrois | 848 | 106 | 2,782 | 348 | 01D | 56 | [56.230930828603;-4.763411801138 NN288077] | Hu,Sim |
| 784 | 1816 | Scotland | 720 | 1416 | Meall Garbh | 848 | 60 | 2,782 | 197 | 03B | 50 | [56.557136218867;-5.1794340527672 NN047451] | Sim |
| 785 | 2017 | Ireland | 17 | 188 | Skregmore | 848 | 50 | 2,781 | 164 | 50C | 78 | [52.013382592907;-9.7601885561528 V792860] | Sim,Hew,Dil,A,VL |
| 786 | 2610 | Scotland | 721 | 2065 | Leum Uilleim South Top | 847 | 33 | 2,780 | 107 | 04A | 41 | [56.730547379436;-4.7280468945845 NN332632] | Sim |
| 787 | 65 | Scotland | 722 | 51 | Canisp | 847 | 689 | 2,779 | 2,260 | 16F | 15 | [58.120604020667;-5.0543318396047 NC202187] | Ma,C,Sim |
| 788 | 1461 | Scotland | 723 | 1128 | Meall an Uillt Chreagaich | 847 | 81 | 2,779 | 266 | 06A | 43 | [56.960183748065;-3.9322336287166 NN826871] | Sim |
| 789 | 2632 | Scotland | 724 | 2084 | Carn a' Choire Bhuidhe | 847 | 32 | 2,779 | 105 | 11B | 34 | [57.206766859381;-5.0082165934285 NH184169] | Sim |
| 790 | 145 | Scotland | 725 | 98 | Ben Donich | 847 | 558 | 2,779 | 1,831 | 19C | 56 | [56.1978503448;-4.8738941374885 NN218043] | Ma,C,Sim |
| 791 | 1595 | Scotland | 726 | 1238 | Meall na Cnap-laraich | 846 | 72 | 2,776 | 236 | 02B | 51 | [56.525262972688;-4.4433322878773 NN498397] | Sim |
| 792 | 2028 | Scotland | 727 | 1586 | Sron Coire an Fhamhair | 846 | 50 | 2,776 | 164 | 13B | 24 | [57.454591750839;-5.6622733747787 NG804464] | Sim |
| 793 | 2556 | Scotland | 728 | 2019 | Craig Damff | 846 | 34 | 2,774 | 110 | 07A | 44 | [56.8845381717;-3.2373492852089 NO247777] | Sim |
| 794 | 185 | Scotland | 729 | 129 | Beinn Resipol | 845 | 502 | 2,772 | 1,647 | 18B | 40 | [56.726616289859;-5.6532580034162 NM766654] | Ma,C,Sim |
| 795 | 1495 | Scotland | 730 | 1157 | Beinn Ceitlein | 845 | 79 | 2,772 | 259 | 03C | 50 | [56.595441425571;-4.9757200416858 NN174488] | Sim |
| 796 | 1778 | Scotland | 731 | 1388 | An Reithe | 845 | 62 | 2,772 | 203 | 11B | 34 | [57.187627811911;-5.0563211545954 NH154149] | Sim |
| 797 | 2101 | Scotland | 732 | 1643 | Aonach Dubh a' Ghlinne | 845 | 47 | 2,772 | 154 | 03B | 41 | [56.63453392753;-5.0685070784627 NN119534] | Sim |
| 798 | 1527 | Ireland | 18 | 157 | Cnoc na Toinne | 845 | 77 | 2,772 | 253 | 50C | 78 | [51.990437015578;-9.7316271501848 V811834] | Sim,Hew,Dil,A,VL |
| 799 | 1271 | Scotland | 733 | 974 | Meall Reamhar | 844 | 97 | 2,770 | 319 | 01C | 56 | [56.305642561693;-4.5489236180478 NN424155] | Sim,sHu |
| 800 | 1246 | Scotland | 734 | 951 | Meall an Uillt Chaoil | 844 | 100 | 2,769 | 328 | 10D | 40 | [56.903713505599;-5.3994390794306 NM931843] | Hu,Sim |
| 801 | 1511 | Scotland | 735 | 1172 | Carn an Leth-choin | 844 | 78 | 2,769 | 256 | 09B | 35 | [57.066785961892;-4.2726226867105 NN623996] | Sim |
| 802 | 1831 | Scotland | 736 | 1426 | Leathad Gaothach | 844 | 59 | 2,769 | 194 | 09B | 35 | [57.060995051503;-4.4372053189638 NN523993] | Sim |
| 803 | 1832 | Scotland | 737 | 1427 | Sgurr a' Ghlas Leathaid | 844 | 59 | 2,769 | 194 | 12A | 25 | [57.563420074961;-4.9389234773869 NH243564] | Sim |
| 804 | 2633 | Scotland | 738 | 2085 | Beinn Bhreac | 843 | 32 | 2,766 | 105 | 09B | 35 | [57.135669302111;-4.0834894268914 NH740069] | Sim |
| 805 | 60 | Scotland | 739 | 46 | Merrick | 843 | 705 | 2,766 | 2,313 | 27B | 77 | [55.138799324664;-4.4692774555587 NX427855] | Ma,C,Sim,D,CoH,CoU,CoA |
| 806 | 1671 | England | 24 | 112 | Stybarrow Dodd | 843 | 68 | 2,766 | 223 | 34C | 90 | [54.561047747672;-3.0175068937802 NY343189] | Sim,Hew,N,W,B,Sy,Fel |
| 807 | 283 | Scotland | 740 | 211 | Ben Vrackie | 842 | 403 | 2,762 | 1,322 | 06B | 43 | [56.748560034314;-3.7185602794012 NN950632] | Ma,C,Sim |
| 808 | 2102 | Scotland | 741 | 1644 | Creag an Lochain | 842 | 47 | 2,762 | 154 | 02B | 51 | [56.532600996589;-4.2941838303323 NN590402] | Sim |
| 809 | 653 | Scotland | 742 | 492 | Carn Ban | 842 | 204 | 2,762 | 669 | 15A | 20 | [57.846028517118;-4.8018100219864 NH338875] | Ma,C,Sim |
| 810 | 2441 | Scotland | 743 | 1926 | Sron nan Tarmachan | 842 | 36 | 2,762 | 118 | 04B | 42 | [56.916046817566;-4.450747800243 NN509832] | Sim |
| 811 | 1800 | England | 25 | 121 | Little Dun Fell | 842 | 61 | 2,762 | 200 | 35A | 91 | [54.691163889223;-2.4607144132493 NY704330] | Sim,Hew,N |
| 812 | 684 | Scotland | 744 | 516 | Beinn Mholach | 842 | 196 | 2,761 | 643 | 05A | 42 | [56.75871752255;-4.3128691334078 NN587654] | Ma,C,Sim |
| 813 | 2228 | Scotland | 745 | 1747 | Creag Easgaidh | 841 | 42 | 2,759 | 138 | 06B | 43 | [56.874260123101;-3.5175798962294 NO076769] | Sim |
| 814 | 182 | Scotland | 746 | 126 | Ben Rinnes | 841 | 513 | 2,759 | 1,683 | 21A | 28 | [57.402850898548;-3.2431245849216 NJ254354] | Ma,C,Sim |
| 815 | 294 | Scotland | 747 | 217 | Sgurr an Airgid | 841 | 394 | 2,759 | 1,293 | 11A | 25 33 | [57.248457990488;-5.416226483872 NG940227] | Ma,C,Sim |
| 816 | 1314 | Scotland | 748 | 1010 | Meall a' Bhuirich | 841 | 93 | 2,759 | 305 | 04A | 41 | [56.794089270583;-4.8604143870317 NN254706] | Sim,sHu |
| 817 | 2532 | Scotland | 749 | 2002 | Baosbheinn North Top | 841 | 34 | 2,759 | 112 | 13A | 19 24 | [57.630620768275;-5.574412369562 NG867657] | Sim |
| 818 | 2573 | Scotland | 750 | 2035 | Glas-leathad Lorgaidh | 841 | 33 | 2,759 | 108 | 06A | 43 | [56.960386217269;-3.9190862808196 NN834871] | Sim |
| 819 | 821 | England | 26 | 51 | St Sunday Crag | 841 | 159 | 2,759 | 522 | 34C | 90 | [54.511060199145;-2.9761049109142 NY369133] | Ma,Sim,Hew,N,W,B,Sy,Fel |
| 820 | 1410 | England | 27 | 97 | Scoat Fell | 841 | 86 | 2,759 | 282 | 34B | 89 | [54.49003784405;-3.2998028988629 NY159113] | Sim,Hew,N,W,B,Sy,Fel |
| 821 | 2127 | Scotland | 751 | 1667 | Beinn Fhionnlaidh East Top | 841 | 46 | 2,759 | 151 | 03B | 50 | [56.600818295517;-5.0869559068139 NN106497] | Sim |
| 822 | 2491 | Scotland | 752 | 1967 | Benty Roads | 841 | 35 | 2,759 | 115 | 07B | 44 | [56.875932949473;-3.1008801045151 NO330766] | Sim |
| 823 | 82 | Scotland | 753 | 62 | Broad Law | 840 | 653 | 2,756 | 2,142 | 28B | 72 | [55.497793446175;-3.3533793448469 NT146235] | Ma,C,Sim,D,CoH,CoU,CoA |
| 824 | 1169 | Scotland | 754 | 894 | Sgurr a' Chlaidheimh | 840 | 108 | 2,756 | 354 | 10B | 33 | [57.072341379256;-5.380201552899 NG952030] | Hu,Sim |
| 825 | 1643 | Scotland | 755 | 1275 | Creag an Dubh-chadha | 840 | 70 | 2,756 | 230 | 05B | 42 | [56.919996402902;-4.0845961349296 NN732829] | Sim |
| 826 | 2492 | Scotland | 756 | 1968 | Stob a' Chearcaill | 840 | 35 | 2,756 | 115 | 10B | 33 | [57.066610554245;-5.5546099975159 NG846029] | Sim |
| 827 | 753 | Ireland | 19 | 94 | Brandon Peak | 840 | 178 | 2,756 | 584 | 49A | 70 | [52.215634840608;-10.23642285734 Q472094] | Ma,Sim,Hew,Dil,A,VL |
| 828 | 210 | Scotland | 757 | 149 | Beinn Trilleachan | 840 | 478 | 2,756 | 1,568 | 03B | 50 | [56.547977080502;-5.1151970477108 NN086439] | Ma,C,Sim |
| 829 | 170 | Scotland | 758 | 118 | Beinn Udlaidh | 840 | 522 | 2,756 | 1,713 | 03C | 50 | [56.458570390493;-4.7929187735405 NN280331] | Ma,C,Sim |
| 830 | 228 | Scotland | 759 | 163 | Carn Chuinneag | 839 | 461 | 2,753 | 1,512 | 15B | 20 | [57.813497580465;-4.5551354663951 NH483833] | Ma,C,Sim |
| 831 | 784 | Scotland | 760 | 589 | Sgurr Gaorsaic | 839 | 170 | 2,753 | 558 | 11A | 25 33 | [57.244565448708;-5.2583416681176 NH035218] | Ma,C,Sim |
| 832 | 1035 | Scotland | 761 | 788 | Druim Leac a' Shith | 839 | 126 | 2,753 | 413 | 10B | 33 40 | [57.035355429516;-5.5153447085339 NM868993] | Hu,Sim |
| 833 | 1094 | England | 28 | 78 | Crag Hill | 839 | 117 | 2,753 | 384 | 34B | 89 90 | [54.571437257179;-3.2513444900944 NY192203] | Hu,Sim,Hew,N,W,B,Sy,Fel |
| 834 | 133 | Ireland | 20 | 29 | Mangerton | 838 | 580 | 2,750 | 1,903 | 52A | 78 | [51.96953879195;-9.4848979866143 V980807] | Ma,Sim,Hew,Dil,A,VL |
| 835 | 235 | Scotland | 762 | 170 | Meall na h-Eilde | 838 | 453 | 2,749 | 1,486 | 10C | 34 | [57.006758550955;-4.9903923899495 NN185946] | Ma,C,Sim |
| 836 | 848 | Scotland | 763 | 640 | Meallan nan Uan | 838 | 155 | 2,749 | 509 | 12A | 25 | [57.546251379035;-4.9041083828144 NH263544] | Ma,C,Sim |
| 837 | 1447 | Scotland | 764 | 1115 | Sgurr a' Chlaidheimh West Top | 838 | 82 | 2,749 | 269 | 10B | 33 | [57.076334651849;-5.39872237049 NG941035] | Sim |
| 838 | 1979 | Scotland | 765 | 1544 | Beinn Dearg Mor East Top | 838 | 52 | 2,749 | 171 | 14A | 19 | [57.763929860428;-5.2999618277273 NH038797] | Sim |
| 839 | 2103 | Scotland | 766 | 1645 | An Staonaig | 838 | 47 | 2,749 | 154 | 09B | 35 | [57.122118777488;-4.3420950480343 NH583059] | Sim |
| 840 | 2153 | Scotland | 767 | 1686 | Beinn Bhreac NW Top | 837 | 45 | 2,747 | 148 | 06A | 43 | [56.925219092185;-3.8679849473213 NN864831] | Sim |
| 841 | 649 | Scotland | 768 | 489 | Sron a' Choire Chnapanich | 837 | 206 | 2,746 | 676 | 02A | 51 | [56.574163615278;-4.5148691694851 NN456453] | Ma,C,Sim |
| 842 | 984 | Scotland | 769 | 745 | Bodach Beag | 837 | 133 | 2,746 | 436 | 15A | 20 | [57.848414756547;-4.7750277000824 NH354877] | Hu,Sim |
| 843 | 1002 | Scotland | 770 | 760 | Meall Dubh | 837 | 131 | 2,746 | 428 | 10C | 34 | [56.995009972784;-4.9169914137246 NN229931] | Hu,Sim |
| 844 | 2253 | Scotland | 771 | 1769 | Creag an Loch | 836 | 41 | 2,743 | 135 | 07A | 43 | [56.947376336522;-3.329847672867 NO192848] | Sim |
| 845 | 2653 | Scotland | 772 | 2101 | The Snub | 836 | 32 | 2,741 | 104 | 07B | 44 | [56.867921377523;-3.0924425696865 NO335757] | Sim |
| 846 | 720 | Scotland | 773 | 541 | Sgurr Cos na Breachd-laoidh | 835 | 187 | 2,740 | 614 | 10B | 33 40 | [56.996791915128;-5.3815769241077 NM947946] | Ma,C,Sim |
| 847 | 1011 | Ireland | 21 | 113 | Caherconree | 835 | 129 | 2,740 | 423 | 49B | 71 | [52.202490382439;-9.853956657372 Q733072] | Hu,Sim,Hew,Dil,A,VL |
| 848 | 2724 | Scotland | 774 | 2166 | Creag na h-Iolaire | 835 | 30 | 2,739 | 99 | 01C | 56 | [56.303947133396;-4.5439606637636 NN427153] | Sim |
| 849 | 1144 | Scotland | 775 | 875 | Braigh Coire na Conlaich | 835 | 110 | 2,739 | 361 | 06A | 43 | [56.879409322101;-3.7426143106139 NN939778] | Hu,Sim |
| 850 | 915 | Scotland | 776 | 691 | Meall Odhar a' Chire | 834 | 143 | 2,736 | 469 | 06A | 42 | [56.882201642863;-3.9774454499194 NN796785] | Hu,Sim,sMa |
| 851 | 533 | Scotland | 777 | 393 | Carn Dearg | 834 | 251 | 2,736 | 823 | 09C | 34 41 | [56.959830851791;-4.7234043278883 NN345887] | Ma,C,Sim |
| 852 | 2574 | Scotland | 778 | 2036 | Meall Odhar Mor | 834 | 33 | 2,736 | 108 | 05B | 42 | [56.930521825992;-4.0999747145191 NN723841] | Sim |
| 853 | 2634 | England | 29 | 181 | Crinkle Crags South Top | 834 | 32 | 2,736 | 105 | 34B | 89 90 | [54.430367875758;-3.1576294946873 NY250045] | Sim,Hew,N,B,Sy |
| 854 | 2635 | Scotland | 779 | 2086 | Beinn Toaig | 834 | 32 | 2,736 | 105 | 03C | 50 | [56.569175220512;-4.8303772132547 NN262455] | Sim |
| 855 | 1260 | Scotland | 780 | 964 | Easter Balloch | 834 | 99 | 2,736 | 325 | 07B | 44 | [56.907626025171;-3.072254057246 NO348801] | Sim,sHu |
| 856 | 754 | Scotland | 781 | 565 | Creag nan Gabhar | 834 | 178 | 2,736 | 584 | 07A | 43 | [56.940410124513;-3.3920587670897 NO154841] | Ma,C,Sim |
| 857 | 878 | Scotland | 782 | 662 | Marg na Craige | 834 | 149 | 2,735 | 489 | 09B | 35 | [57.046051264618;-4.2763015729826 NN620973] | Hu,Sim,sMa |
| 858 | 1980 | Scotland | 783 | 1545 | Meall nan Oighreag | 833 | 52 | 2,733 | 171 | 01A | 51 52 | [56.480248355374;-4.1042626094324 NN705340] | Sim |
| 859 | 1871 | Scotland | 784 | 1457 | Creag Riabhach | 833 | 57 | 2,733 | 187 | 15A | 20 | [57.856709658699;-4.7655512067424 NH360886] | Sim |
| 860 | 1427 | Wales | 26 | 79 | Pen yr Helgi Du | 833 | 85 | 2,732 | 278 | 30B | 115 | [53.148155506733;-3.9497558901202 SH697630] | Sim,Hew,N |
| 861 | 352 | Wales | 27 | 21 | Cadair Berwyn | 832 | 346 | 2,730 | 1,135 | 30E | 125 | [52.880112623882;-3.3819056370333 SJ071323] | Ma,Sim,Hew,N,CoH,CoA |
| 862 | 123 | Ireland | 22 | 26 | Purple Mountain | 832 | 593 | 2,730 | 1,946 | 50C | 78 | [52.007262764352;-9.6230461512276 V886851] | Ma,Sim,Hew,Dil,A,VL |
| 863 | 2617 | Scotland | 785 | 2072 | Sgaraman nam Fiadh North Top | 831 | 32 | 2,728 | 106 | 09B | 35 | [57.13724409615;-4.3017321932923 NH608075] | Sim |
| 864 | 2319 | Scotland | 786 | 1820 | Bac nam Fuaran | 831 | 39 | 2,726 | 128 | 09B | 34 | [57.072482048506;-4.58150485394 NH436009] | Sim |
| 865 | 2397 | Scotland | 787 | 1888 | Leac an Taobhain | 831 | 37 | 2,726 | 121 | 06A | 43 | [56.94058361188;-3.921356353025 NN832849] | Sim |
| 866 | 1542 | Wales | 28 | 87 | Foel-goch | 831 | 76 | 2,726 | 249 | 30B | 115 | [53.13025234579;-4.0520858721739 SH628612] | Sim,Hew,N |
| 867 | 2173 | Scotland | 788 | 1702 | Stob Glas | 831 | 44 | 2,725 | 145 | 01C | 51 56 | [56.347122504351;-4.5856797552364 NN403202] | Sim |
| 868 | 889 | Scotland | 789 | 668 | Cramalt Craig | 830 | 147 | 2,724 | 484 | 28B | 72 | [55.508952975777;-3.3189257165204 NT168247] | Hu,Sim,D,sMa,xC |
| 869 | 667 | Scotland | 790 | 500 | Beinn Dearg | 830 | 201 | 2,723 | 659 | 02A | 51 | [56.618417189769;-4.2700494160073 NN608497] | Ma,C,Sim |
| 870 | 1706 | Scotland | 791 | 1327 | An Caisteal | 830 | 66 | 2,723 | 217 | 17B | 32 | [57.239573835503;-6.2113826958409 NG460244] | Sim |
| 871 | 1931 | Scotland | 792 | 1504 | Buidhe Bheinn North Top | 830 | 54 | 2,723 | 177 | 10A | 33 | [57.133941526279;-5.3626751971445 NG966098] | Sim |
| 872 | 2104 | Scotland | 793 | 1646 | An t-Slat-bheinn | 830 | 47 | 2,723 | 154 | 18A | 40 | [56.838360156146;-5.6444645495376 NM778778] | Sim |
| 873 | 1761 | Scotland | 794 | 1373 | Carn na Drochaide | 830 | 63 | 2,723 | 207 | 06B | 43 | [56.956914444103;-3.4420062660461 NO124860] | Sim |
| 874 | 2320 | Scotland | 795 | 1821 | Lochnagar NW Top | 830 | 39 | 2,723 | 128 | 07A | 44 | [56.980323379473;-3.2717876888581 NO228884] | Sim |
| 875 | 1040 | Scotland | 796 | 792 | Meall Cruinn | 830 | 126 | 2,722 | 413 | 02A | 51 | [56.595769812784;-4.513046953323 NN458477] | Hu,Sim |
| 876 | 2657 | Scotland | 797 | 2105 | Caisteal a' Garbh-Choire | 830 | 32 | 2,722 | 104 | 17B | 32 | [57.201614700264;-6.2169940642383 NG454202] | Sim |
| 877 | 894 | Scotland | 798 | 672 | Glas Mheall Mor | 829 | 147 | 2,721 | 481 | 05A | 42 | [56.775037905011;-4.3531562232891 NN563673] | Hu,Sim,sMa |
| 878 | 2704 | Scotland | 799 | 2147 | Druim Fiaclach East Top | 829 | 31 | 2,721 | 101 | 18A | 40 | [56.850118103202;-5.6111513033489 NM799790] | Sim |
| 879 | 1462 | Scotland | 800 | 1129 | Mullach Buidhe | 829 | 81 | 2,720 | 266 | 20C | 62 69 | [55.636304519217;-5.1901962246147 NR993427] | Sim |
| 880 | 107 | Scotland | 801 | 77 | Carn Mor | 829 | 613 | 2,720 | 2,011 | 10D | 33 40 | [56.961637956369;-5.4507946239497 NM903909] | Ma,C,Sim |
| 881 | 1707 | Scotland | 802 | 1328 | Carn Chuinneag West Top | 829 | 66 | 2,720 | 217 | 15B | 20 | [57.813225726291;-4.5685858855152 NH475833] | Sim |
| 882 | 444 | Scotland | 803 | 329 | Brown Cow Hill | 829 | 295 | 2,720 | 968 | 08B | 36 | [57.123899910738;-3.2882688087008 NJ221044] | Ma,C,Sim |
| 883 | 1662 | Scotland | 804 | 1290 | Meall na Feithe Faide | 828 | 69 | 2,717 | 226 | 02A | 51 | [56.572729122054;-4.5847833699618 NN413453] | Sim |
| 884 | 2720 | Scotland | 805 | 2162 | Bawhelps | 828 | 30 | 2,717 | 99 | 07A | 44 | [56.833897349187;-3.2700963545246 NO226721] | Sim |
| 885 | 1543 | Scotland | 806 | 1197 | Creag nan Calman | 828 | 76 | 2,717 | 249 | 16F | 15 | [58.052470131284;-5.1214078431979 NC159113] | Sim |
| 886 | 2575 | Scotland | 807 | 2037 | Toll a' Ghobhain | 828 | 33 | 2,717 | 108 | 12A | 25 | [57.501277933315;-5.1309342914499 NH125500] | Sim |
| 887 | 323 | England | 30 | 16 | High Street | 828 | 373 | 2,717 | 1,224 | 34C | 90 | [54.49122829036;-2.8660213800556 NY440110] | Ma,Sim,Hew,N,W,B,Sy,Fel |
| 888 | 2533 | England | 31 | 175 | Black Crag | 828 | 34 | 2,717 | 112 | 34B | 89 | [54.492848937032;-3.2890845345758 NY166116] | Sim,Hew,N,B,Sy |
| 889 | 578 | Scotland | 808 | 431 | An Dun | 827 | 232 | 2,715 | 761 | 05B | 42 | [56.894419176905;-4.1094411262306 NN716801] | Ma,Sim,C |
| 890 | 1216 | Scotland | 809 | 931 | Glas Meall a' Chumhainn | 827 | 103 | 2,713 | 338 | 05A | 42 | [56.796857265151;-4.3397838255616 NN572697] | Hu,Sim |
| 891 | 2493 | Scotland | 810 | 1969 | Creag Bhreac | 827 | 35 | 2,713 | 115 | 06B | 43 | [56.849893550861;-3.5264316221138 NO070742] | Sim |
| 892 | 1672 | Scotland | 811 | 1299 | Burrach Mor | 827 | 68 | 2,713 | 223 | 09B | 35 | [57.144557562647;-4.3435132575896 NH583084] | Sim |
| 893 | 2555 | Wales | 29 | 144 | Moel Sych | 827 | 34 | 2,712 | 111 | 30E | 125 | [52.875532590466;-3.3891894385187 SJ066318] | Sim,Hew,N,CoH,CoU |
| 894 | 1779 | Scotland | 812 | 1389 | Beinn a' Chrasgain | 827 | 62 | 2,712 | 203 | 09B | 35 | [57.052810671375;-4.2998009610411 NN606981] | Sim |
| 895 | 569 | Scotland | 813 | 424 | Beinn Tarsuinn | 826 | 235 | 2,710 | 771 | 20C | 62 69 | [55.621474879065;-5.2414197431498 NR960412] | Ma,C,Sim |
| 896 | 1206 | Scotland | 814 | 924 | Meall Coire nan Saobhaidh | 826 | 104 | 2,710 | 341 | 10C | 34 | [57.010810240018;-5.0088402790154 NN174951] | Hu,Sim,xC |
| 897 | 1780 | Scotland | 815 | 1390 | An t-Uiriollach | 826 | 62 | 2,710 | 203 | 10B | 33 40 | [57.032212898569;-5.5628630259656 NM839991] | Sim |
| 898 | 2154 | Scotland | 816 | 1687 | Meall an Tarmachain | 826 | 45 | 2,710 | 148 | 10D | 40 | [56.937788683017;-5.4354328267715 NM911882] | Sim |
| 899 | 1781 | England | 32 | 119 | Red Pike (Wasdale) | 826 | 62 | 2,710 | 203 | 34B | 89 | [54.483847830135;-3.2903449120206 NY165106] | Sim,Hew,N,W,B,Sy,Fel |
| 900 | 199 | Ireland | 23 | 39 | Beenoskee | 826 | 492 | 2,710 | 1,614 | 49B | 70 | [52.213133595718;-10.078267920563 Q580088] | Ma,Sim,Hew,Dil,A,VL |
| 901 | 1244 | Ireland | 24 | 136 | Lyracappul | 825 | 100 | 2,708 | 329 | 53A | 74 | [52.359715944693;-8.2282404519179 R845231] | Hu,Sim,Hew,Dil,A,VL |
| 902 | 1477 | Scotland | 817 | 1142 | Beinn Gharbh | 825 | 80 | 2,707 | 262 | 10D | 40 | [56.93738695696;-5.4173060058437 NM922881] | Sim |
| 903 | 2288 | Scotland | 818 | 1799 | Carn Coire na Creiche | 825 | 40 | 2,707 | 131 | 09B | 35 | [57.147539775043;-4.2792271727307 NH622086] | Sim |
| 904 | 1459 | Scotland | 819 | 1126 | Meall Buidhe West Top | 825 | 82 | 2,705 | 268 | 02A | 51 | [56.603733330737;-4.4744696115135 NN482485] | Sim |
| 905 | 592 | Scotland | 820 | 443 | Geal-charn Mor | 824 | 227 | 2,703 | 745 | 09B | 35 | [57.186683700999;-3.9274997325328 NH836123] | Ma,C,Sim |
| 906 | 2029 | Scotland | 821 | 1587 | Sgorr Dhonuill West Top | 824 | 50 | 2,703 | 164 | 03B | 41 | [56.651336324626;-5.2216351640918 NN026557] | Sim |
| 907 | 2732 | Scotland | 822 | 2173 | Bruthach na Craoibhe | 824 | 30 | 2,703 | 98 | 05B | 42 | [56.911364929259;-4.1169677134206 NN712820] | Sim |
| 908 | 1872 | Scotland | 823 | 1458 | Cnapan Nathraichean | 824 | 57 | 2,703 | 187 | 07A | 44 | [56.983831902607;-3.2801350959141 NO223888] | Sim |
| 909 | 1558 | Scotland | 824 | 1210 | Sron a' Ghairbh Choire Mhoir | 823 | 75 | 2,700 | 246 | 18B | 40 | [56.700017572773;-5.4186181561831 NM908617] | Sim |
| 910 | 2289 | Scotland | 825 | 1800 | Beinn Fhada Far North Top | 823 | 40 | 2,700 | 131 | 03B | 41 | [56.65087014659;-4.9882470401453 NN169550] | Sim |
| 911 | 2077 | Scotland | 826 | 1624 | Creag Mhor | 822 | 48 | 2,697 | 157 | 02A | 51 52 | [56.614210459535;-4.1003033956179 NN712489] | Sim |
| 912 | 1570 | Scotland | 827 | 1220 | Druim a' Chuirn | 822 | 74 | 2,697 | 243 | 10B | 33 40 | [57.001851718562;-5.3606209994546 NM960951] | Sim |
| 913 | 2398 | Scotland | 828 | 1889 | An Staonaig West Top | 822 | 37 | 2,697 | 121 | 09B | 35 | [57.11809482045;-4.3649676137564 NH569055] | Sim |
| 914 | 2078 | England | 33 | 141 | Hart Crag | 822 | 48 | 2,697 | 157 | 34C | 90 | [54.492190454938;-2.9756551624727 NY369112] | Sim,Hew,N,W,B,Sy,Fel |
| 915 | 2733 | Ireland | 25 | 223 | Carrignabinnia | 822 | 30 | 2,697 | 98 | 53A | 74 | [52.364223077559;-8.220923813474 R850236] | Sim,Hew,VL |
| 916 | 1932 | Ireland | 26 | 183 | Benagh | 822 | 54 | 2,697 | 177 | 49A | 70 | [52.238001164099;-10.241939472273 Q469119] | Sim,Hew,A,VL |
| 917 | 1596 | Scotland | 829 | 1239 | Carn Dubh | 822 | 72 | 2,697 | 236 | 07A | 43 | [56.920780086765;-3.3798280472846 NO161819] | Sim |
| 918 | 616 | Scotland | 830 | 464 | Benvane | 821 | 215 | 2,694 | 705 | 01C | 57 | [56.293045576825;-4.3686907122132 NN535137] | Ma,C,Sim |
| 919 | 775 | Scotland | 831 | 581 | Geal Charn | 821 | 173 | 2,694 | 568 | 08B | 36 | [57.195126060523;-3.50754989459 NJ090126] | Ma,C,Sim |
| 920 | 1544 | Wales | 30 | 88 | Carnedd y Filiast | 821 | 76 | 2,694 | 249 | 30B | 115 | [53.14352039096;-4.0646807151757 SH620627] | Sim,Hew,N |
| 921 | 321 | Scotland | 832 | 238 | White Coomb | 821 | 374 | 2,694 | 1,227 | 28B | 79 | [55.421731807871;-3.3239164904651 NT163150] | Ma,C,Sim,D,CoH |
| 922 | 600 | Scotland | 833 | 451 | Beinn Dearg Bheag | 820 | 225 | 2,690 | 738 | 14A | 19 | [57.775648512267;-5.3329982714063 NH019811] | Ma,C,Sim |
| 923 | 2178 | Scotland | 834 | 1706 | Sgurr na Feartaig North Top | 819 | 44 | 2,687 | 144 | 12A | 25 | [57.465956418376;-5.2480121540406 NH053464] | Sim |
| 924 | 1009 | Scotland | 835 | 765 | Meall a' Mheanbh-chruidh | 819 | 130 | 2,685 | 425 | 09C | 34 41 | [56.966942668098;-4.6433002939232 NN394893] | Hu,Sim |
| 925 | 1873 | Scotland | 836 | 1459 | North Goatfell | 818 | 57 | 2,684 | 187 | 20C | 62 69 | [55.631653622458;-5.196174617075 NR989422] | Sim |
| 926 | 419 | Scotland | 837 | 311 | Sgorr na Diollaid | 818 | 306 | 2,684 | 1,004 | 12B | 25 | [57.383661550341;-4.8612771111131 NH281362] | Ma,C,Sim |
| 927 | 1933 | Scotland | 838 | 1505 | Meall Garbh | 818 | 54 | 2,684 | 177 | 14A | 19 | [57.825952268428;-5.2651995090819 NH062865] | Sim |
| 928 | 743 | Scotland | 839 | 560 | Beinn Chaorach | 818 | 180 | 2,684 | 591 | 02B | 50 | [56.458660033854;-4.6663056079979 NN358328] | Ma,C,Sim |
| 929 | 606 | Scotland | 840 | 455 | Carn na Drochaide | 818 | 222 | 2,684 | 728 | 08B | 36 43 | [57.027018323072;-3.4397779835183 NO127938] | Ma,C,Sim |
| 930 | 1689 | Scotland | 841 | 1312 | Carn Liath | 818 | 67 | 2,684 | 220 | 06B | 43 | [56.961427928224;-3.5885528485835 NO035867] | Sim |
| 931 | 2716 | Scotland | 842 | 2158 | Carn Bhac South Top | 818 | 31 | 2,682 | 100 | 06B | 43 | [56.909490063345;-3.5748493632082 NO042809] | Sim |
| 932 | 2566 | Scotland | 843 | 2029 | Sgurr an Ursainn | 817 | 33 | 2,681 | 109 | 10D | 40 | [56.923551340286;-5.4949490611707 NM874868] | Sim |
| 933 | 1545 | Scotland | 844 | 1198 | Meall an Fhiodhain | 817 | 76 | 2,680 | 249 | 01C | 51 | [56.388969679311;-4.3811261537984 NN531244] | Sim |
| 934 | 1644 | Scotland | 845 | 1276 | Dollar Law | 817 | 70 | 2,680 | 230 | 28B | 72 | [55.53696991292;-3.3040175587137 NT178278] | Sim,D |
| 935 | 668 | Scotland | 846 | 501 | Carn Dearg | 817 | 201 | 2,680 | 659 | 09B | 34 | [57.03086133554;-4.7220084819699 NN349966] | Ma,C,Sim |
| 936 | 755 | Scotland | 847 | 566 | Carn a' Chuilinn | 817 | 178 | 2,680 | 584 | 09B | 34 | [57.094232771145;-4.6160367217561 NH416034] | Ma,C,Sim |
| 937 | 2734 | Scotland | 848 | 2174 | Beinn Tharsuinn North Top | 817 | 30 | 2,680 | 98 | 12A | 25 | [57.442639263549;-5.2459432707403 NH053438] | Sim |
| 938 | 654 | Ireland | 27 | 82 | Tonelagee | 817 | 204 | 2,680 | 669 | 55B | 56 | [53.053435811029;-6.3826411552914 O085015] | Ma,Sim,Hew,Dil,A,VL |
| 939 | 184 | Scotland | 849 | 128 | Stob Coire Creagach | 817 | 504 | 2,680 | 1,654 | 01D | 50 56 | [56.257520973059;-4.8589896564913 NN230109] | Ma,C,Sim |
| 940 | 1826 | Scotland | 850 | 1421 | Sron a' Chleirich | 816 | 59 | 2,678 | 194 | 06A | 42 | [56.867523790835;-3.9963584726485 NN784769] | Sim |
| 941 | 1745 | Scotland | 851 | 1359 | Meall Ton Eich | 815 | 64 | 2,674 | 210 | 02B | 51 | [56.518940238069;-4.3518834764568 NN554388] | Sim |
| 942 | 1496 | Scotland | 852 | 1158 | Meall Ruigh Mor Thearlaich | 815 | 79 | 2,674 | 259 | 06B | 43 | [56.828875043816;-3.5550750590525 NO052719] | Sim |
| 943 | 2442 | Scotland | 853 | 1927 | Meall an Odhar | 815 | 36 | 2,674 | 118 | 02A | 51 | [56.570167103775;-4.4901838695732 NN471448] | Sim |
| 944 | 147 | England | 34 | 5 | The Cheviot | 815 | 556 | 2,674 | 1,824 | 33 | 74 75 | [55.478231194889;-2.1455253045905 NT909205] | Ma,Sim,Hew,N,CoH,CoU,CoA |
| 945 | 416 | Scotland | 854 | 308 | Breabag | 815 | 307 | 2,674 | 1,007 | 16E | 15 | [58.097028401917;-4.9097379306825 NC286157] | Ma,C,Sim |
| 946 | 2030 | Scotland | 855 | 1588 | Cadha nam Bo Ruadha | 815 | 50 | 2,674 | 164 | 10A | 33 | [57.136587513696;-5.3645687233124 NG965101] | Sim |
| 947 | 2534 | Scotland | 856 | 2003 | Meall Chaorach | 815 | 34 | 2,674 | 112 | 04B | 41 | [56.844517053449;-4.6526985576389 NN383757] | Sim |
| 948 | 2672 | England | 35 | 183 | Shelter Crags | 815 | 31 | 2,674 | 102 | 34B | 89 90 | [54.437541219619;-3.1593736513069 NY249053] | Sim,Hew,N,B,Sy |
| 949 | 2202 | Scotland | 857 | 1728 | Creag na h-Iolaire | 814 | 43 | 2,672 | 141 | 09B | 35 | [57.088871143362;-4.193097365971 NH672019] | Sim |
| 950 | 41 | Ireland | 28 | 6 | Mweelrea | 814 | 778 | 2,671 | 2,552 | 47A | 37 | [53.637146784754;-9.8316012465924 L789668] | Ma,Sim,Hew,Dil,A,VL,CoH,CoU |
| 951 | 485 | Scotland | 858 | 357 | An Sithean | 814 | 270 | 2,671 | 886 | 12A | 25 | [57.461000305591;-5.0507687313726 NH171453] | Ma,C,Sim |
| 952 | 520 | Scotland | 859 | 382 | An Stac | 814 | 255 | 2,671 | 837 | 18A | 40 | [56.850143503188;-5.6718651410834 NM762792] | Ma,C,Sim |
| 953 | 1847 | Scotland | 860 | 1440 | Calpa Mor | 814 | 58 | 2,671 | 190 | 09B | 35 | [57.168645445709;-4.204437515189 NH668108] | Sim |
| 954 | 200 | Scotland | 861 | 141 | Corserine | 814 | 488 | 2,671 | 1,601 | 27B | 77 | [55.154441386803;-4.3603624725853 NX497870] | Ma,C,Sim,D |
| 955 | 2121 | Scotland | 862 | 1661 | Meall Dhamh | 814 | 46 | 2,669 | 152 | 01C | 50 56 | [56.359518455532;-4.5946145012716 NN398216] | Sim |
| 956 | 829 | Scotland | 863 | 625 | Beinn Each | 813 | 158 | 2,667 | 518 | 01B | 57 | [56.313890875486;-4.2632610761016 NN601158] | Ma,C,Sim |
| 957 | 2254 | Scotland | 864 | 1770 | Creag an Dearg Lochain | 813 | 41 | 2,667 | 135 | 09B | 35 | [57.076763067124;-4.4118381460945 NH539010] | Sim |
| 958 | 2443 | Scotland | 865 | 1928 | Blargie Craig | 813 | 36 | 2,667 | 118 | 09B | 35 | [57.040123258881;-4.3056102224168 NN602967] | Sim |
| 959 | 574 | Scotland | 866 | 428 | Sgor Mor | 813 | 234 | 2,667 | 768 | 08A | 43 | [57.003038865043;-3.6364283149695 NO007914] | Ma,C,Sim |
| 960 | 2494 | Scotland | 867 | 1970 | Cam Chreag | 812 | 35 | 2,664 | 115 | 01C | 51 | [56.385627145232;-4.3679571162136 NN539240] | Sim |
| 961 | 33 | Scotland | 868 | 26 | Askival | 812 | 812 | 2,664 | 2,664 | 17D | 39 | [56.974243716695;-6.2916751153526 NM393952] | Ma,C,Sim,SIB |
| 962 | 1959 | Scotland | 869 | 1526 | Carn Sgulain | 812 | 53 | 2,664 | 174 | 09B | 35 | [57.153348853498;-4.153925220277 NH698090] | Sim |
| 963 | 102 | Wales | 31 | 6 | Waun Fach | 811 | 622 | 2,661 | 2,041 | 32A | 161 | [51.962016536303;-3.1438992916762 SO215299] | Ma,Sim,Hew,N |
| 964 | 785 | Scotland | 870 | 590 | Carn na Saobhaidhe | 811 | 170 | 2,661 | 558 | 09B | 35 | [57.198871630903;-4.322122162938 NH598144] | Ma,C,Sim |
| 965 | 2444 | Wales | 32 | 139 | Cyfrwy | 811 | 36 | 2,661 | 118 | 30F | 124 | [52.701788832901;-3.9209141972869 SH703133] | Sim,Hew,N |
| 966 | 1247 | Scotland | 871 | 952 | Binnein an Fhidhleir | 811 | 100 | 2,661 | 328 | 01D | 50 56 | [56.25512743702;-4.8846473776102 NN214107] | Hu,Sim |
| 967 | 252 | Scotland | 872 | 186 | Meall a' Bhuachaille | 810 | 436 | 2,657 | 1,430 | 08A | 36 | [57.183153346349;-3.6725118301618 NH990115] | Ma,C,Sim |
| 968 | 892 | Scotland | 873 | 670 | Beinn an Tuim | 810 | 147 | 2,657 | 482 | 10D | 40 | [56.896450188163;-5.4020639960552 NM929835] | Hu,Sim,sMa,xC |
| 969 | 1183 | Scotland | 874 | 904 | Carn na Laraiche Maoile | 810 | 107 | 2,657 | 351 | 09B | 35 | [57.169719758056;-4.3434518696816 NH584112] | Hu,Sim,xC |
| 970 | 545 | Scotland | 875 | 405 | Creach Bheinn | 810 | 245 | 2,657 | 804 | 03B | 50 | [56.53011999063;-5.216208025511 NN023422] | Ma,C,Sim |
| 971 | 1782 | Scotland | 876 | 1391 | Meall Copagach | 810 | 62 | 2,657 | 203 | 03C | 50 | [56.462698165001;-5.0010419853706 NN152341] | Sim |
| 972 | 565 | Scotland | 877 | 420 | Meall na Fearna | 809 | 236 | 2,654 | 774 | 01B | 57 | [56.340449824343;-4.1855490009125 NN650186] | Ma,C,Sim |
| 973 | 1960 | Scotland | 878 | 1527 | Creag an Tulabhain | 809 | 53 | 2,654 | 174 | 02B | 51 | [56.543172321688;-4.4005629136051 NN525416] | Sim |
| 974 | 154 | Scotland | 879 | 106 | Quinag - Sail Gharbh | 809 | 550 | 2,654 | 1,804 | 16E | 15 | [58.215060862137;-5.0505256109552 NC209292] | Ma,C,Sim |
| 975 | 615 | Scotland | 880 | 463 | Sgurr Innse | 809 | 216 | 2,654 | 709 | 04A | 41 | [56.833111373525;-4.804366551158 NN290748] | Ma,C,Sim |
| 976 | 1653 | Scotland | 881 | 1283 | Carn Icean Duibhe | 809 | 69 | 2,654 | 226 | 09B | 35 | [57.176129563746;-4.1353980832302 NH710115] | Sim |
| 977 | 2535 | Scotland | 882 | 2004 | Creag Bac na Faire | 809 | 34 | 2,654 | 112 | 15A | 20 | [57.78080935696;-4.9818160543752 NH228807] | Sim |
| 978 | 2536 | Ireland | 29 | 213 | Faha Ridge | 809 | 34 | 2,654 | 112 | 49A | 70 | [52.238759974022;-10.24929821593 Q464120] | Sim,Hew,A,VL |
| 979 | 625 | Scotland | 883 | 471 | Creag Mac Ranaich | 809 | 213 | 2,653 | 699 | 01C | 51 | [56.399276990199;-4.359081215853 NN545255] | Ma,C,Sim |
| 980 | 738 | Scotland | 884 | 557 | Garbh-bheinn | 808 | 181 | 2,651 | 594 | 17B | 32 | [57.232706181572;-6.0928621559464 NG531232] | Ma,C,Sim |
| 981 | 1054 | Scotland | 885 | 804 | Stob Cadha na Beucaich | 808 | 123 | 2,651 | 404 | 16B | 9 | [58.394540174503;-4.8674788312838 NC325487] | Hu,Sim |
| 982 | 1746 | Scotland | 886 | 1360 | Sgurr Dubh | 808 | 64 | 2,651 | 210 | 14A | 19 | [57.698949514749;-5.3779890457921 NG988727] | Sim |
| 983 | 671 | Scotland | 887 | 504 | Hart Fell | 808 | 200 | 2,651 | 656 | 28B | 78 | [55.407377214236;-3.402407460187 NT113135] | Ma,C,Sim,D |
| 984 | 2155 | Scotland | 888 | 1688 | Little Hills West | 808 | 45 | 2,651 | 148 | 01D | 50 56 | [56.273646538215;-4.7422610733611 NN303124] | Sim |
| 985 | 1081 | Scotland | 889 | 827 | Creag an Lochain | 807 | 119 | 2,649 | 391 | 16D | 16 | [58.217649757707;-4.427470395805 NC575280] | Hu,Sim |
| 986 | 2352 | Scotland | 890 | 1850 | Beinn Pharlagain South Top | 807 | 38 | 2,648 | 125 | 04B | 42 | [56.734451129145;-4.5435562821498 NN445632] | Sim |
| 987 | 238 | Scotland | 891 | 173 | Creag Rainich | 807 | 451 | 2,648 | 1,480 | 14A | 19 | [57.725175962185;-5.1989865361811 NH096751] | Ma,C,Sim |
| 988 | 1377 | Scotland | 892 | 1060 | Beinn Bhreac Mhor | 807 | 89 | 2,648 | 292 | 09B | 35 | [57.249721894656;-4.1927010732677 NH678198] | Sim |
| 989 | 1261 | Scotland | 893 | 965 | Carlin's Cairn | 807 | 99 | 2,648 | 325 | 27B | 77 | [55.166082755089;-4.3626207054836 NX496883] | Sim,D,sHu |
| 990 | 334 | England | 36 | 17 | High Stile | 807 | 362 | 2,648 | 1,188 | 34B | 89 90 | [54.521665448946;-3.2838122064299 NY170148] | Ma,Sim,Hew,N,B,Sy,Fel |
| 991 | 1597 | England | 37 | 107 | Lingmell | 807 | 72 | 2,648 | 236 | 34B | 89 90 | [54.46209147137;-3.2217781413867 NY209081] | Sim,Hew,N,W,B,Sy,Fel |
| 992 | 676 | Scotland | 894 | 509 | Monamenach | 807 | 199 | 2,648 | 653 | 07A | 43 | [56.8195654279;-3.3515288022831 NO176706] | Ma,C,Sim |
| 993 | 44 | Ireland | 30 | 7 | Nephin | 806 | 768 | 2,644 | 2,520 | 46B | 23 31 | [54.012615048487;-9.3690314570568 G103079] | Ma,Sim,Hew,Dil,A,VL |
| 994 | 623 | Scotland | 895 | 469 | Meall nan Subh | 806 | 214 | 2,644 | 702 | 02B | 51 | [56.524033541368;-4.5050410699342 NN460397] | Ma,C,Sim |
| 995 | 659 | Scotland | 896 | 496 | Ben Gulabin | 806 | 203 | 2,644 | 666 | 06B | 43 | [56.832524115994;-3.4765555485407 NO100722] | Ma,C,Sim |
| 996 | 1848 | Scotland | 897 | 1441 | Carn Ghriogair | 806 | 58 | 2,644 | 190 | 09B | 35 | [57.250036956023;-4.2258745979606 NH658199] | Sim |
| 997 | 505 | Scotland | 898 | 370 | Beinn nam Fuaran | 806 | 260 | 2,644 | 853 | 02B | 50 | [56.506328034678;-4.6647767957458 NN361381] | Ma,C,Sim |
| 998 | 1801 | Scotland | 899 | 1404 | Wester Balloch | 806 | 61 | 2,644 | 200 | 07B | 44 | [56.897646955238;-3.0834600465208 NO341790] | Sim |
| 999 | 978 | Scotland | 900 | 740 | Meall nam Fuaran | 805 | 134 | 2,641 | 440 | 01A | 52 | [56.50227719467;-3.9088744748858 NN826361] | Hu,Sim |
| 1000 | 244 | Scotland | 901 | 179 | Beinn Iaruinn | 805 | 446 | 2,641 | 1,463 | 09C | 34 | [56.96971578026;-4.8047576252591 NN296900] | Ma,C,Sim |

== DoBIH codes ==
The DoBIH uses the following codes for the various classifications of mountains and hills in the British Isles, which many of the above peaks also fall into:

- Ma Marilyn
- Hu HuMP
- Sim Simm
- 5 Dodd
- M Munro
- MT Munro Top
- F Furth
- C Corbett
- G Graham
- D Donald
- DT Donald Top
- Hew Hewitt
- N Nuttall
- Dew Dewey
- DDew Donald Dewey
- HF Highland Five
- 4 400-499m Tump
- 3 300-399m Tump (GB)
- 2 200-299m Tump (GB)
- 1 100-199m Tump (GB)
- 0 0-99m Tump (GB)
- W Wainwright
- WO Wainwright Outlying Fell
- B Birkett
- Sy Synge
- Fel Fellranger
- CoH County Top – Historic (pre-1974)
- CoA County Top – Administrative (1974 to mid-1990s)
- CoU County Top – Current County or Unitary Authority
- CoL County Top – Current London Borough
- SIB Significant Island of Britain
- Dil Dillon
- A Arderin
- VL Vandeleur-Lynam
- O Other list (which includes):
  - Bin Binnion
  - Bg Bridge
  - BL Buxton & Lewis
  - Ca Carn
  - CT Corbett Top
  - GT Graham Top
  - Mur Murdo
  - P500 P500
  - P600 P600
- Un unclassified

prefixes:
- s sub
- x deleted

suffixes:
= twin

== People who have climbed all hills in a group ==
As of 31 December 2023, 7,654 people had climbed all 282 Scottish Munros; as of April 2020 eleven people had climbed all 1556 Marilyns of Great Britain; (Note: Does include the IOM, but does not include the 454 Marilyns on the Island of Ireland) while as of December 2024 only six people had climbed all the 2532 Simms of Great Britain: (Note: Does not include IOM or Ireland) Ken Whyte (Cruachan Beag 21/09/2010), Iain Thow (Cut Hill 07/06/2015), Michael Earnshaw (Cruach Fhiarach 16/07/2019), Rob Woodall (Sgurr Dhonuill West Top 28/06/2021), Anne Bunn (Torr Ceum na Caillich, 24/09/2022) and Callum Gray (Sgurr Dubh, 21/12/2024). The first three have also climbed the Irish Simms, so including all the Simms of the British Isles.

== See also ==
- Lists of mountains and hills in the British Isles
- Lists of mountains in Ireland
- List of Munro mountains
- List of Murdo mountains
- List of Furth mountains in the British Isles
- List of Marilyns in the British Isles
- List of P600 mountains in the British Isles
