= Creach Bheinn (Morvern) =

Mountain in Scotland

Coordinates: 56.66154°N 5.47716°W

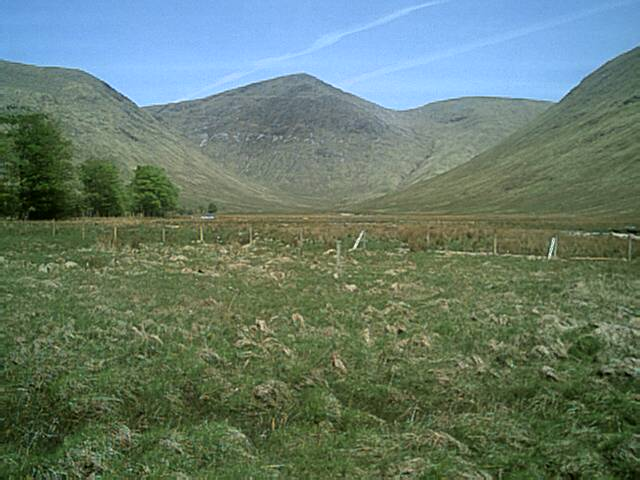
- Glen Galmadale and the summit of Creach Bheinn seen from the south

Highest point
- Elevation: 853 m (2,799 ft)
- Prominence: 755 m (2,477 ft); Ranked 48th in British Isles
- Parent peak: Sgurr Dhomhnuill
- Listing: Corbett, Marilyn

Naming
- English translation: Hill of spoil
- Language of name: Scottish Gaelic
- Pronunciation: Scottish Gaelic: [ˈkʰɾʲɛxveɲ]

Geography
- Location: Ardgour, Highland, Scotland
- Parent range: Northwest Highlands
- OS grid: NM870576
- Topo map: OS Landranger 49

Creach Bheinn is a prominent mountain in the Morvern area in the west of Scotland. It is less steep and even less frequently climbed than its northern neighbour, Garbh Bheinn, but the views to the south and west to the islands are open and extensive.

== Ascents ==
Compared with other hills in the Ardgour area, the slopes of Creach Bheinn are smooth. The best starting point for the climbers is on the west side of the bridge at Glengalmadale. Parking is limited but sufficient for current demand. From there, a wet track followed by a boggy path lead up Glen Galmadale to the foot of the mountain, which is easily ascended. Alternatively, some or all of a horseshoe ridge can be included. The entire ridge, which includes two additional Marilyns, involves about 1,500 metres (4,900 feet) of uphill climbing.

== Summit Camp ==
Near the summit there are ruins of a camp, which is thought to have been used by early surveyors.
