= Morrone =

Coordinates: 56.98040°N 3.43140°W

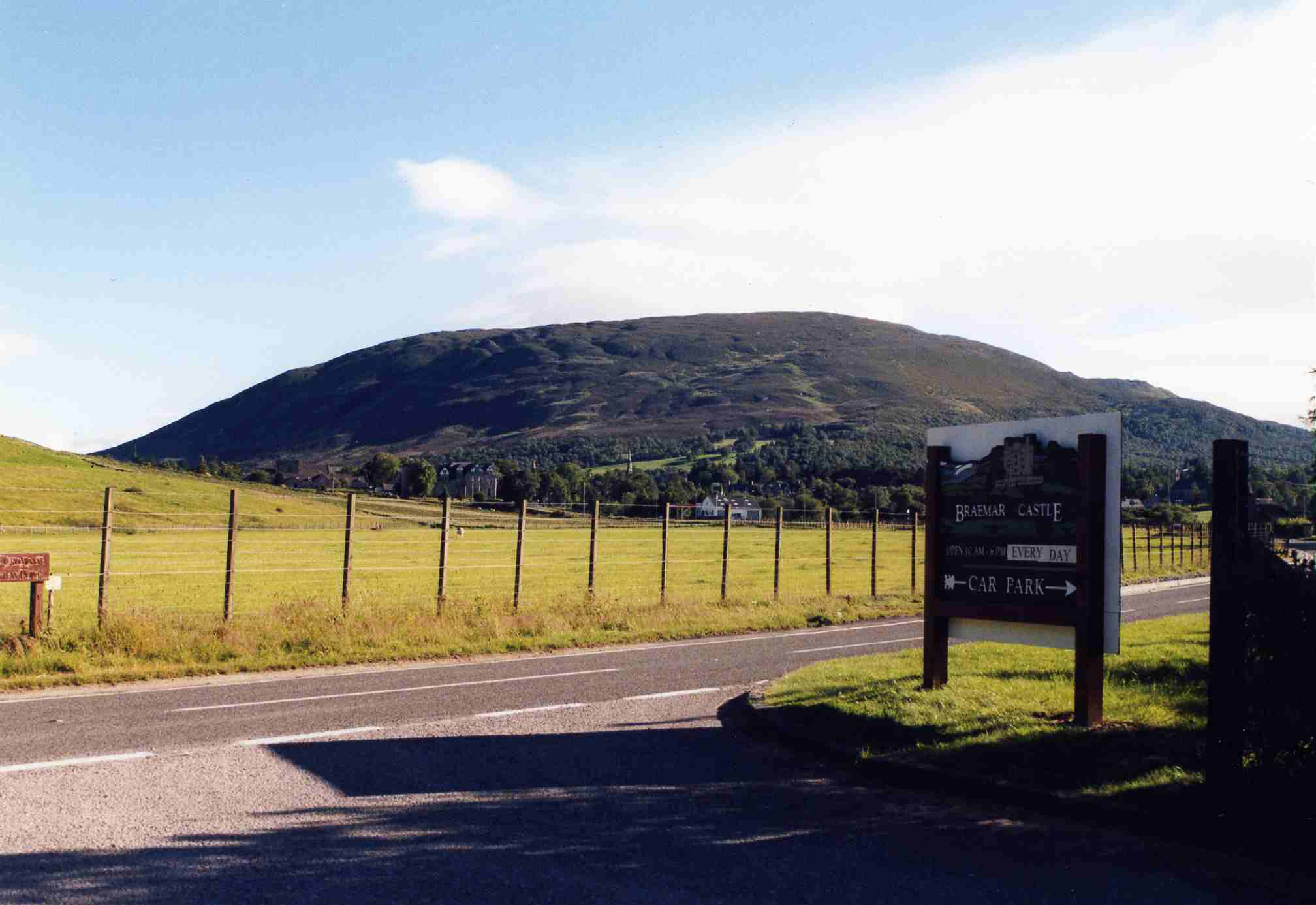
- Morrone seen from Braemar Castle.

Highest point
- Elevation: 859 m (2,818 ft)
- Prominence: 155 m (509 ft)
- Listing: Corbett, Marilyn

Naming
- English translation: Big Hill or Big Nose
- Language of name: Gaelic
- Pronunciation: /məˈroʊn/

Geography
- Location: Aberdeenshire, Scotland
- Parent range: Grampians
- OS grid: NO131886
- Topo map: OS Landranger 43, OS Explorer 387

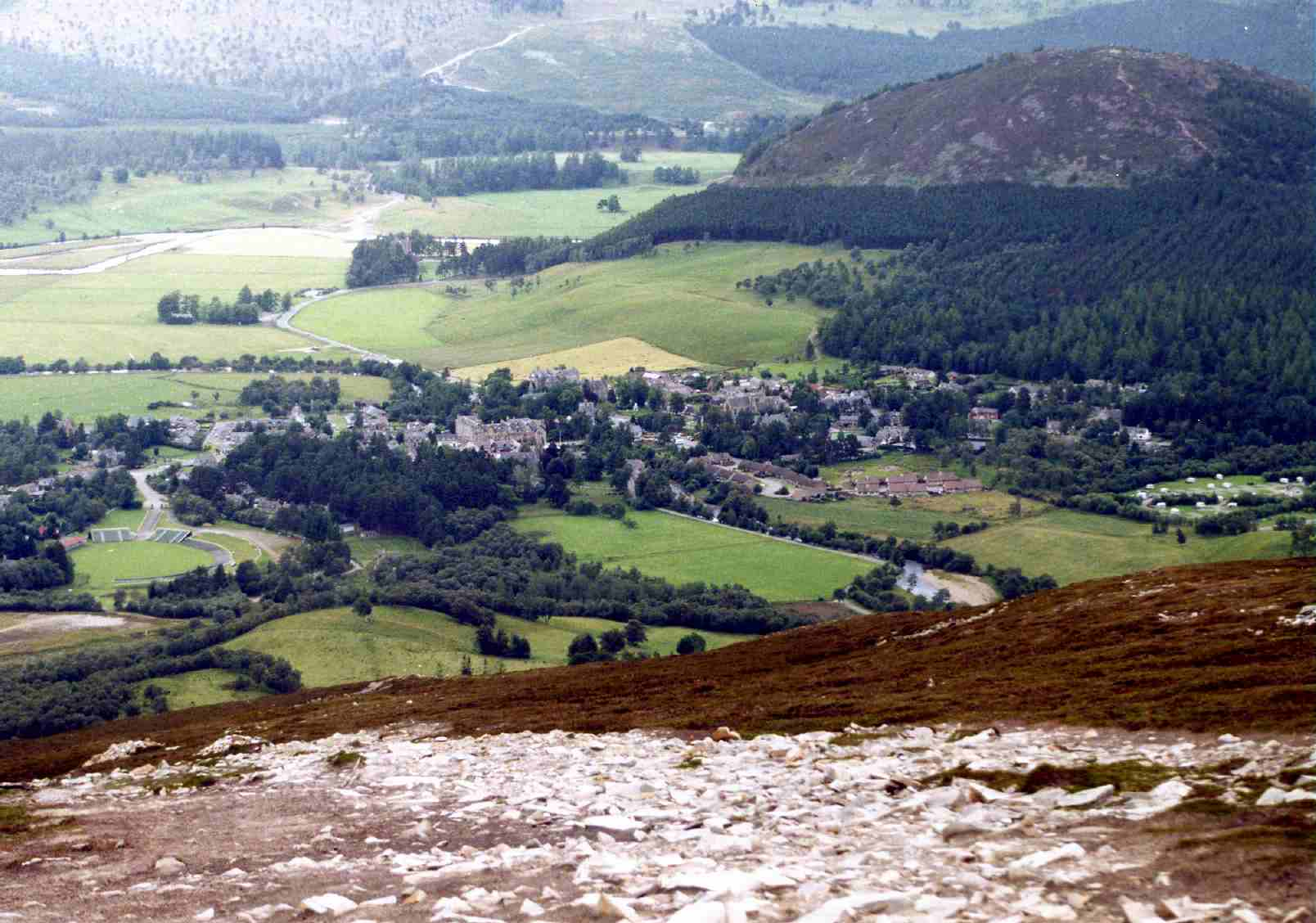
Braemar as seen from high up on Morrone.

Morrone (Scottish Gaelic: Mór Bheinn, or Mór Shròn) is a Scottish hill immediately southwest of the village of Braemar in Aberdeenshire.

== Geography and topography ==
At its peak, Morrone reaches a height of 859 metres (2818 feet) and qualifies as a Corbett and a Marilyn, although with a topographic prominence of 155 metres, it only just meets the prominence criterion for these categories. Morrone very much belongs to the village of Braemar from which it is usually climbed, and with a starting elevation of 330 metres, it is an easy ascent and a unique one, being the only significant mountain climb in Scotland to start from the centre of a village. Morrone is used for the Braemar Gathering hill race every September, and is a popular venue for paragliding and hang-gliding. The hill is occasionally referred to as Morven and it is given both names on Ordnance Survey maps, although Hamish Brown says I’ve never heard it called Morven. In point of fact, the pronunciation of Morrone does not correspond closely with the pronunciation of Mór Shròn, and the derivation of Morrone is a complex question. Watson and Allan come down on the side of Mór Bheinn. Morrone is not to be confused with Morven, the highest point in Caithness, or with the local Morven, a mere 29 km (18 mi) to the northeast.

Morrone has a prominent profile, dominating the village of Braemar, and lives up to its name, which translates as Big Hill or Big Nose, but the hill is otherwise undistinguished, having few topographical highlights. It has a long south ridge, continuing from its summit over undulating ground to link with the Munro of An Socach nine kilometres to the south. Its eastern flanks are drained by the Coldrach Burn and the Allt Coire na Sgreuchaig, both flowing into the Clunie Water to join the River Dee just north of Braemar. The northern and western slopes are drained by a series of streams running directly into the Dee as it passes to the north of the hill. Morrone has three named but unexceptional corries on its slopes, the Coire Allt a' Chlair to the west of the summit, the Coire nam Muc to the north and the Coire na Sgreuchaig on the north eastern slopes.

== Morrone Birkwood ==
The hill's lower northern slopes are the site of the Morrone Birkwood Special Area of Conservation, managed by Scottish Natural Heritage. Floristically unaltered since the end of the last ice age, it is the sole surviving example in Britain of a sub-alpine birch-juniper wood on basic soils. It is also the most extensive and diverse example of a transition between woodland and juniper scrub in the UK. Some of the stands of juniper are the largest and most diverse in Scotland, and it has an extensive range of rare flora such as twinflower, interrupted club moss and globeflower. There are tufa-forming springs on the site, and it is the habitat of the endangered Geyer’s whorl snail. In the past the wood has been subject to high levels of grazing by deer, but since its declaration as a conservation area, the wood has been fenced to exclude deer and some natural regeneration has taken place.

== Ascents and view ==
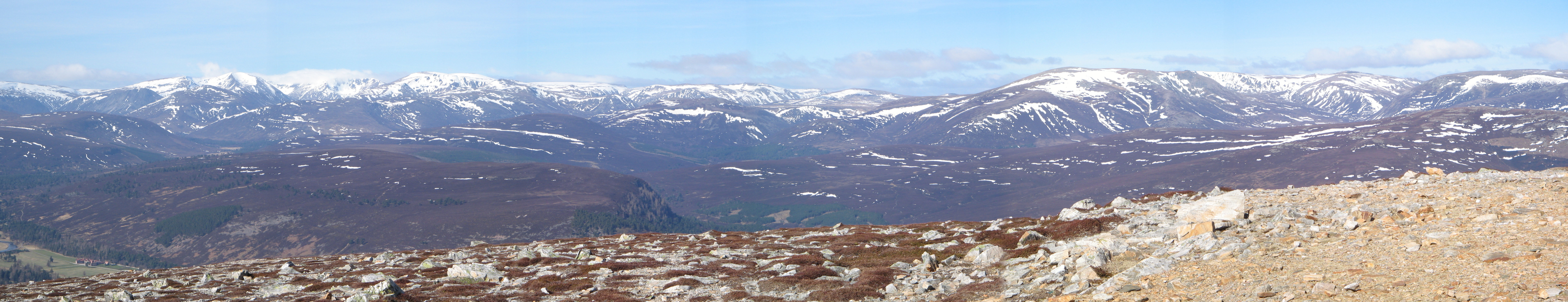
A Panoramic View From The Summit of Morrone.

Morrone is usually climbed from the village of Braemar. From the centre of the village, Chapel Brae is followed to the car park by the duck pond. From here a track goes south through the woods to reach a viewpoint with a plaque identifying the surrounding mountains. The main track swings right to the Birkwood, but the route is to the left for a hundred metres, and then takes a footpath on the right up the open hillside. It is then a two kilometre climb south west to the summit.

Nearing the summit, one has a bird's-eye view of Braemar. The top of the hill is adorned with a radio mast and buildings dating from 1969, part of a University of Aberdeen research station. Braemar mountain rescue team also has a radio relay station on the summit. At the highest point there is a trig point and a large cairn. The view is extensive, with an all-round mountain panorama from the Cairngorms to Lochnagar and the Glenshee Ski Centre. The descent from the mountain can be varied by following the vehicle track serving the summit structures, which runs south and then east to end on the old military road in Glen Clunie, from where it is a short walk back to Braemar.

== References and footnotes ==
- Climbing The Corbetts, Baton Wicks, 1996, Hamish Brown, ISBN 1-898573-08-5
- The Corbetts and Other Scottish Hills, SMC, 1990, Scott Johnstone et al., ISBN 0-907521-29-0
- The Corbett Almanac, Neil Wilson Publishing, 1994, Cameron McNeish, ISBN 1-897784-14-7
- The Place Names of Upper Deeside, Aberdeen University Press, 1984, Adam Watson and Elizabeth Allan, ISBN 0-08-030403-6

Footnotes
