= Beinn Dearg Mòr =

Mountain in Scotland

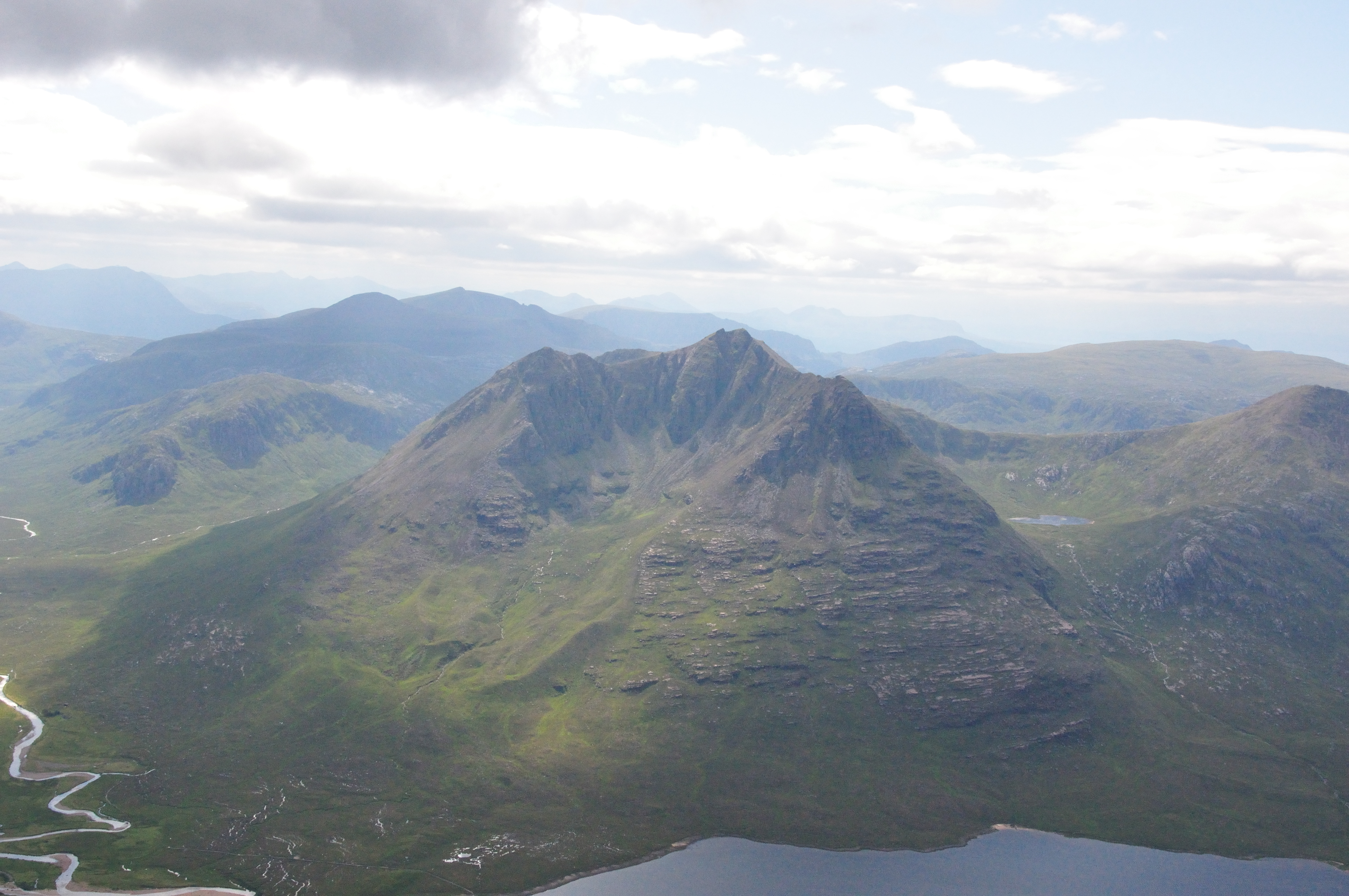
- Beinn Dearg Mor from Sail Liath, August 2009

Highest point
- Elevation: 906.28 m (2,973.4 ft)
- Prominence: 564 m (1,850 ft)
- Listing: Corbett, Marilyn
- Coordinates: 57.7655°N 5.3099°W

Naming
- English translation: Big red mountain
- Language of name: Gaelic
- Pronunciation: Scottish Gaelic: [peɲ ˈtʲɛɾɛk moːɾ]

Geography
- Location: Dundonnell and Fisherfield Forest, Scotland
- OS grid: NH03217993
- Topo map: OS Landranger 19

Beinn Dearg Mòr is a Corbett in the middle of the Fisherfield Forest, near Dundonnell and Northwest Highlands in Scotland. It rises to an elevation of 906.28 metres (2,973 ft) above sea level.

Beinn Dearg Mòr and Beinn Dearg Bheag, its neighbour, sit across the Loch na Sealga (also referred to as na Sheallag) from An Teallach, "The Anvil."
