= An Dun =

Iron Age fort in Scotland

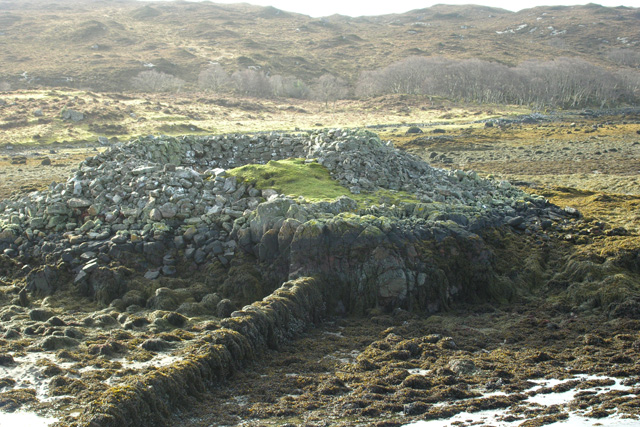
- An Dun, Loch Ardbhair

- Location within Highland
- 58.249614°N 5.122025°W
- Type: Broch

Identifiers
- HES: SM1832

Scheduled monument
- Official name: An Dun, broch 800m SSW of Ardvar, Loch Ardbhair
- Type: Prehistoric domestic and defensive: broch
- Designated: 14 October 1938

An Dun is an Iron Age broch or dun at the south-east of Loch Ardbhair, Highland, Scotland, UK.

An Dun stands on an isolated rock at the south end of Loch Ardbhair, a sea inlet, and on its eastern shore, about 100 foot (30 m) from the mainland, to which it is connected by a rough causeway of boulders, now part displaced. The broch is only approachable at low tide, and at high water there is little space between the edge of the rock and the base of the building. It is a dry-built circular construction with an interior diameter of 24 feet (7.3 m), the wall being 10 feet 6 inches (3.20 m) thick near the base. The entrance passage is from the south, only 2 feet (0.61 m) wide at the interior end, and remains to a height of 3 feet 6 inches (1.07 m) on the left side. Only one or two of the lowest courses of the outside wall of the building remain visible in places, and the rest is concealed by ruins. The interior has probably been cleared of debris, and there the wall exists to a height of 7 feet 4 inches (2.24 m).

A 1911 survey of the broch reported that "there are no signs of chambers in the walls, nor of galleries, the building is poor, the stones are not carefully selected and laid, and the numerous interstices are packed with small angular fragments". A later, 1980, appraisal notes that "reservations on it being a broch are caused by its small size, and absence of evidence of intra-mural chambers. On balance it is more likely to be a broch."

An Dun was designated a Scheduled Monument on 14 October 1938.
