= Beinn Dearg Bheag =

Mountain in Scotland

- Beinn Dearg Bheag

Highest point
- Elevation: 817.9 m (2,683 ft)
- Prominence: 226.1 m (742 ft)
- Parent peak: Beinn Dearg Mor
- Listing: Corbett, Marilyn
- Coordinates: 57°46′34″N 5°19′53″W

Geography
- Location: Wester Ross, Scotland
- Parent range: Northwest Highlands
- OS grid: NH019811
- Topo map: OS Landranger 19

Beinn Dearg Bheag (817.9 m) is a mountain in the Northwest Highlands, Scotland. It is located in the wild Dundonnell and Fisherfield Forest area of Wester Ross, a long way from any road or settlement.

Any climb is often done in conjunction with its neighbour Beinn Dearg Mor, another Corbett. Due to its extremely remote location, many climbers will camp overnight either in the wild or in the nearby bothy.
