= Garbh Bheinn (Ardgour) =

Mountain in Scotland

Coordinates: 56.70343°N 5.42546°W

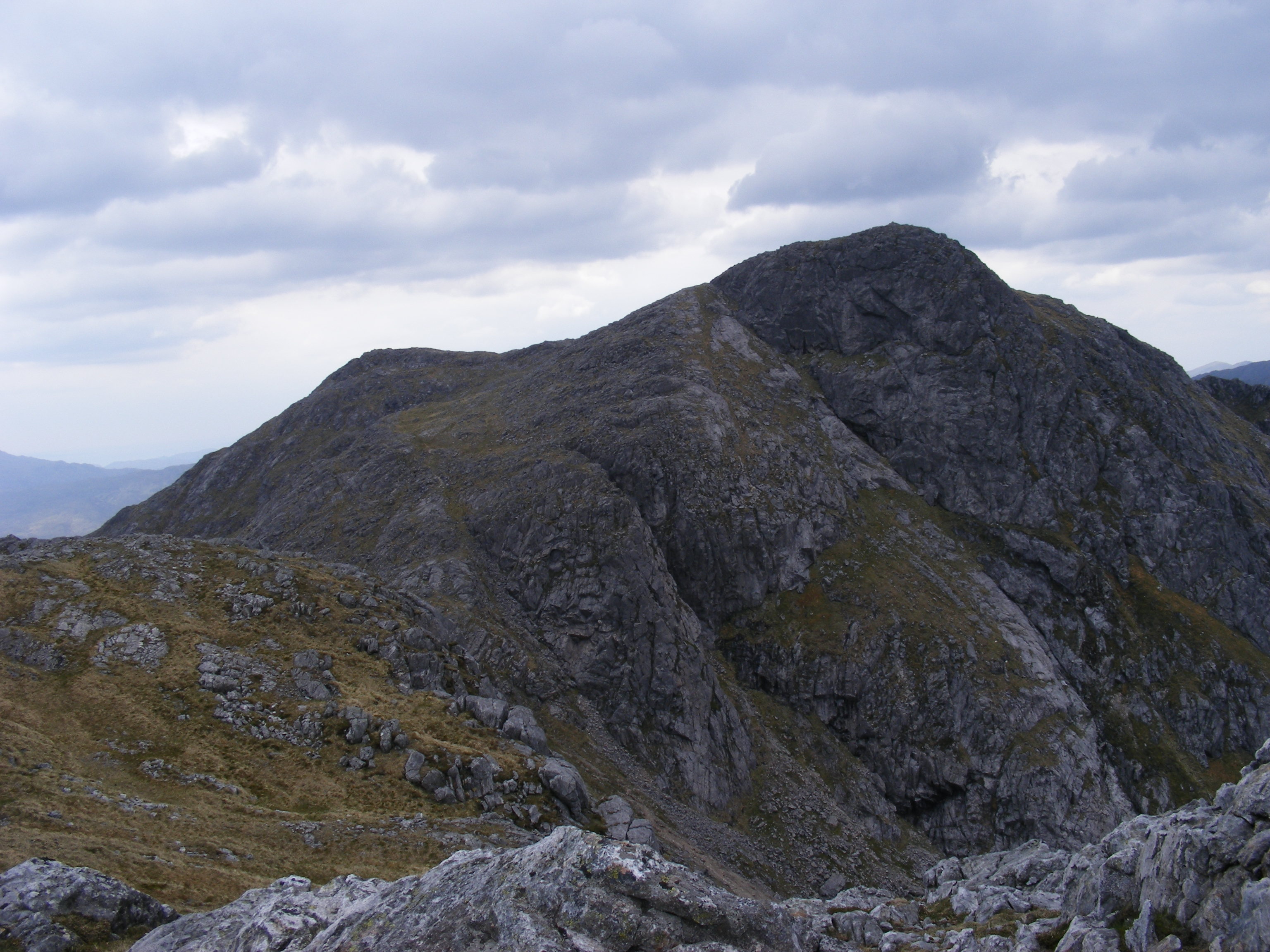
- The main summit of Garbh Bheinn seen from its south east top

Highest point
- Elevation: 885 m (2,904 ft)
- Prominence: 687 m (2,254 ft)Ranked 69th in British Isles
- Parent peak: Sgurr Dhomhnuill
- Listing: Corbett, Marilyn

Naming
- English translation: Rough hill

Geography
- Location: Ardgour, Highland, Scotland
- Parent range: Northwest Highlands
- OS grid: NM904622
- Topo map: OS Landranger 40, 49

Garbh Bheinn is a mountain in Scotland. Its name is Scots Gaelic for "rough mountain".

== Ascents ==
There are several possible routes of ascent. All of them are steep and likely to require scrambling in places. Although most present no technical difficulties in good conditions, careful route finding may be required when descending from the main summit, especially in mist. Most approaches start at the old bridge at the foot of its south east ridge, where there is parking space. From there, the best route of ascent may be up the crest of the ridge, or via a path to the north of this ridge and then up to the saddle between the main summit and its south east top. There are no constructed paths up or onto the ridge, but the boots of successive climbers have created steps which show and facilitate the way in some places, but disappear or are creating erosion in others.
