= Sgùrr Dhòmhnuill =

Mountain in Scotland

Coordinates: 56.75386°N 5.45461°W

Sgurr Dhòmhnuill (mountain)
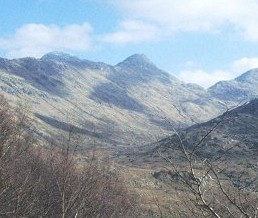
- Looking up Strontian Glen towards Sgurr Dhòmhnuill

Highest point
- Elevation: 888 m (2,913 ft)
- Prominence: c. 873 m Ranked 17th in British Isles
- Parent peak: Carn Eige
- Listing: Corbett, Marilyn, P600

Naming
- English translation: Donald's rocky peak
- Language of name: Gaelic
- Pronunciation: Scottish Gaelic: [ˈs̪kuːɾ ˈɣɔ͂ː.ɪʎ]

Geography
- Location: Ardgour, Scotland
- OS grid: NM889678
- Topo map: OS Landranger 40

Sgurr Dhòmhnuill or Sgurr Dhòmhnaill is a mountain in western Scotland. The summit lies about ten kilometres (six miles) northeast of Strontian.
