= Ben Nevis =

Highest mountain in the British Isles

- Beinn Nibheis
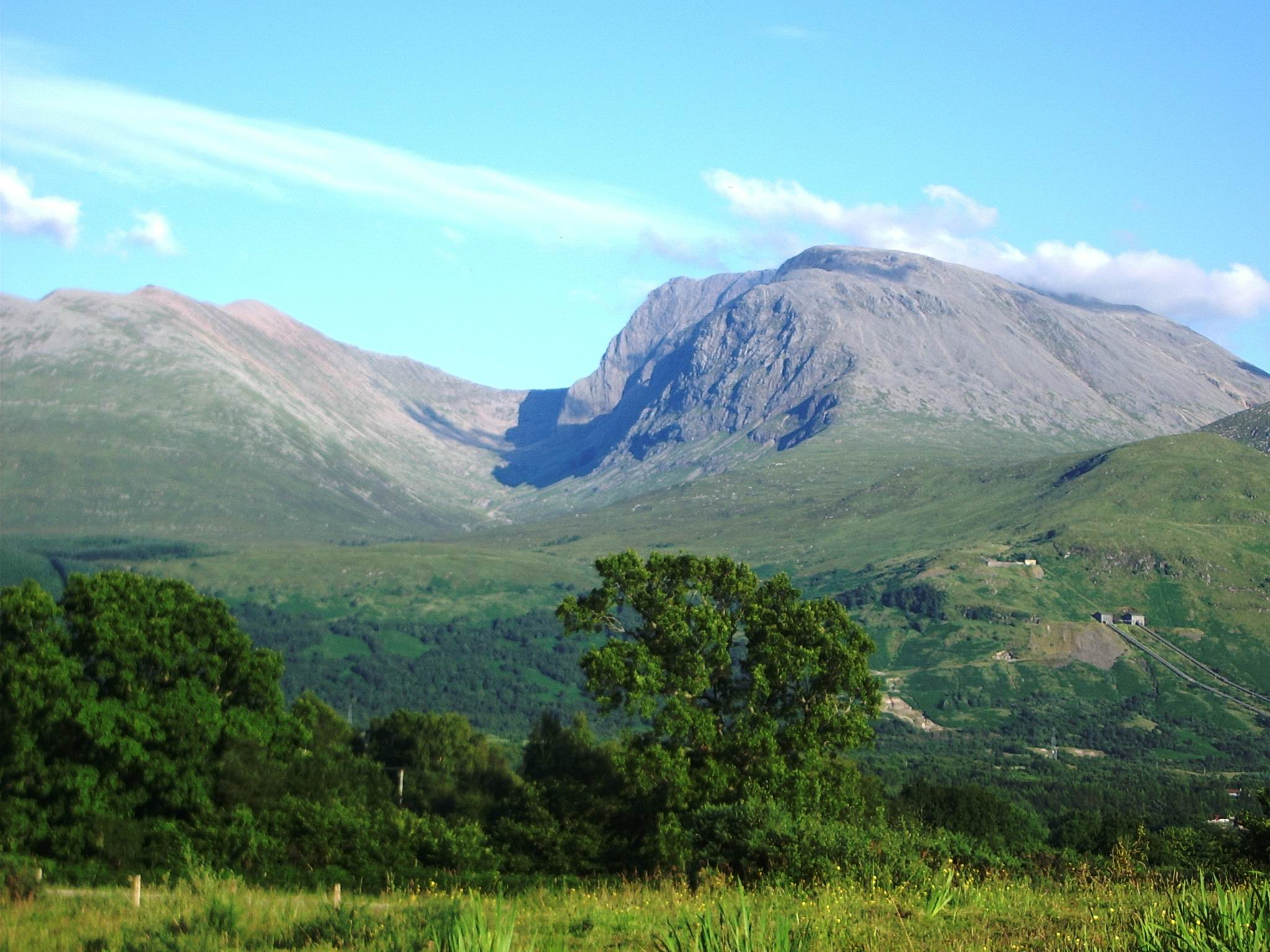
- Ben Nevis from Banavie. The summit is beyond and to the left of the apparent highest point.

Highest point
- Elevation: 1,345 m (4,413 ft)
- Prominence: 1,345 m (4,413 ft); Ranked 1st in British Isles
- Parent peak: none – Highest peak on the British Isles
- Isolation: 739 km (459 mi)
- Listing: Munro; Marilyn; Ribu; Council top (Highland); County top (Inverness-shire); Country high point
- Coordinates: 56°47′49″N 5°00′13″W

Geography
- Ben Nevis in the Highland council area Ben Nevis in Scotland
- Location: Lochaber, Highland, Scotland
- Parent range: Grampian Mountains
- OS grid: NN166712
- Topo map: OS Landranger 41, Explorer 392

Climbing
- First ascent: 19 August 1771, by James Robertson
- Easiest route: Pony track and mountain path

Ben Nevis (/ˈnɛvɪs/ NEV-iss; Scottish Gaelic: Beinn Nibheis, Scottish Gaelic pronunciation: [pe(ɲ) ˈɲivɪʃ]) is the highest mountain in Scotland, the United Kingdom, and the British Isles. Ben Nevis stands at the western end of the Grampian Mountains in the Highland region of Lochaber, close to the town of Fort William.

The mountain is a popular destination, attracting an estimated 150,000 visitors a year, around three-quarters of whom use the Mountain Track from Glen Nevis. The mountain has hosted a foot race since 1898. The 700-metre (2,300 ft) cliffs of the north face are among the highest in Scotland, providing classic scrambles and rock climbs of all difficulties for climbers and mountaineers. They are also the principal locations in Scotland for ice climbing. The cliffs of the north face can be viewed from the Charles Inglis Clark Memorial Hut, a private alpine hut.

The summit is 1,345 metres (4,413 ft) above sea level and is the highest land in any direction for 739 kilometres (459 miles). (Note: This is the distance to the mountain Melderskin in Norway.) The summit is a stony plateau (a felsenmeer). It features a number of monuments and the ruins of an observatory which was continuously staffed between 1883 and 1904. The meteorological data collected during this period is still important for understanding Scottish mountain weather. C. T. R. Wilson was inspired to invent the cloud chamber after a period spent working at the observatory.

The mountain gives its name to the Ben Nevis Distillery at its base, a packet ship, Ben Nevis mountain in Svalbard, a mountain more commonly known as Hung Fa Chai in Hong Kong, and the cartoon character Wee Ben Nevis.

== Etymology ==
The name comes from the Gaelic Beinn Nibheis, meaning "mountain of the Nevis" (referring to the river that skirts the base of the mountain). The river's name is of unclear origin. William J. Watson derived it from Old Gaelic *Nemess, "venomous one", from ne(i)m, "venom". W. F. H. Nicolaisen, however, favoured a derivation from the Indo-European root *nebh-, which is connected with water and clouds, giving a meaning of "the moist one" or "the misty one".

As with many Scottish mountains, Ben Nevis is often referred to locally simply as "the Ben".

== Geography ==
Ben Nevis forms a massif with its neighbours to the northeast, Càrn Mòr Dearg, to which it is linked by the Càrn Mòr Dearg Arête, Aonach Beag and Aonach Mòr. All four are Munros.

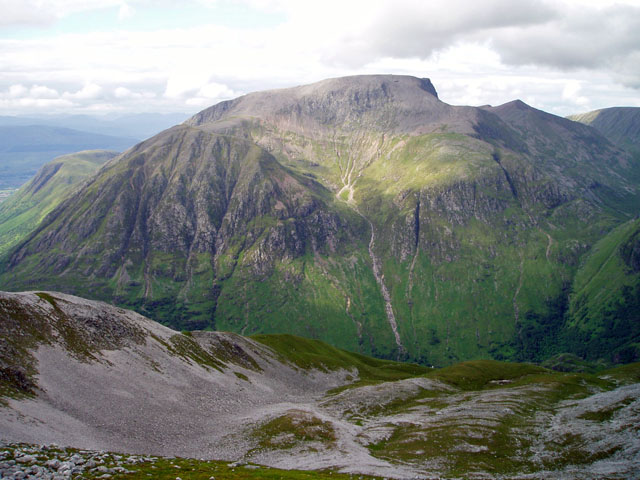
The steep south face of Ben Nevis from Sgurr a' Mhàim

The western and southern flanks of Ben Nevis rise 1,200 metres (3,900 ft) in about 2 kilometres (1.2 mi) above the River Nevis flowing down Glen Nevis – the longest and steepest hill slope in Britain – with the result that the mountain presents an aspect of massive bulk on this side. To the north, by contrast, cliffs drop some 600 metres (2,000 ft) to Coire Leis (IPA: [ˈkʰɔɾʲə ˈleʃ]).

In addition to the main 1,345-metre (4,413 ft) summit, Ben Nevis has two subsidiary "tops" listed in Munro's Tables, both of which are called Càrn Dearg ("red hill"). The higher of these, at 1,220.8 metres (4,005 ft), is to the northwest, and is often mistaken for Ben Nevis itself in views from the Fort William area. The other Càrn Dearg (1,021.6 m (3,352 ft)) juts out into Glen Nevis on the mountain's southwestern side. A lower hill, Meall an t-Suidhe (712.4 metres (2,337 ft)), is further west, forming a saddle with Ben Nevis which contains a small loch, Lochan Meall an t-Suidhe. The tourist path from Glen Nevis skirts the side of this hill before ascending Ben Nevis's broad western flank.

=== Summit ===
The summit of Ben Nevis comprises a large stony plateau of about 40 hectares (100 acres). The summit is an example of a felsenmeer, a surface covered by rocks that are not exposed by mass wasting. The highest point is marked with a large, solidly built cairn atop which sits an Ordnance Survey trig point. The summit is the highest ground in any direction for 738.6 kilometres (458.9 mi) before the Scandinavian Mountains in western Norway are reached.

The Peace Memorial, on the summit, is a cairn which was erected on V-J Day, 15 August 1945, by the Young Men's Class of Vicar Street Methodist Church, Dudley, led by Bert Bissell, "to the glory of God and in memory of the fallen of all races". They carried the materials, including a 2cwt memorial stone, to the summit. The inscription declares it to be "Britain's highest war memorial". A second plaque was added in 1965, brought by helicopter: "A tribute to the fallen of all nations from the youth associated with the World Federation of United Nations Associations and the International Student Movement of the United Nations." It is variously known as the Ben Nevis War Memorial, Ben Nevis Peace Memorial, or The Fort William-Dudley Memorial and Peace Cairn A 2006 proposal to move the cairn to the foot of the Ben, was opposed by people in both Fort William and Dudley.

The view from the UK's highest point is extensive. Under ideal conditions, it can extend to over 190 kilometres (120 mi), including such mountains as the Torridon Hills, Morven in Caithness, Lochnagar, Ben Lomond, Barra Head and to Knocklayd in County Antrim, Northern Ireland.

In 2016, the height of Ben Nevis was officially remeasured to be 1344.527m by Ordnance Survey. The height of Ben Nevis will therefore be shown on new Ordnance Survey maps as 1,345 metres (4,411 ft) instead of the now obsolete value of 1,344 metres (4,409 ft).

=== Climate ===
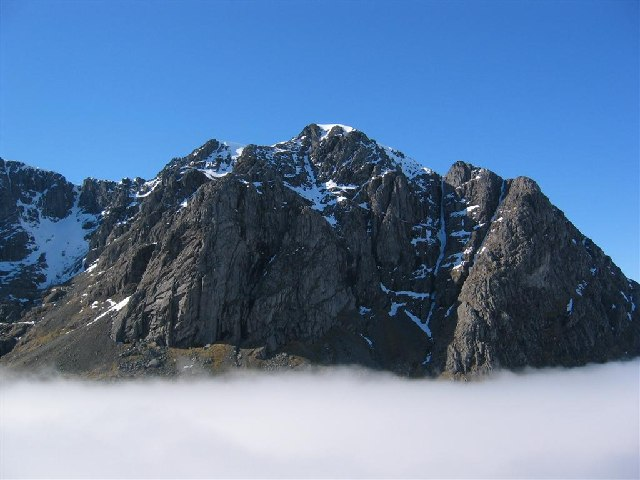
A temperature inversion around Càrn Dearg Buttress and Castle Corrie

Ben Nevis has a highland tundra climate (ET in the Köppen classification). Ben Nevis's elevation, maritime location and topography frequently lead to cool and cloudy weather conditions, which can pose a danger to ill-equipped walkers. According to the observations carried out at the summit observatory from 1883 to 1904, fog was present on the summit for almost 80% of the time between November and January, and 55% of the time in May and June. The average winter temperature was around −5 °C (23 °F), and the mean monthly temperature for the year was −0.5 °C (31.1 °F). In an average year the summit sees 261 gales, and receives 4,350 millimetres (171 in) of rainfall, compared to only 2,050 millimetres (81 in) in nearby Fort William, 840 millimetres (33 in) in Inverness and 580 millimetres (23 in) in London. Rainfall on Ben Nevis is about twice as high in the winter as it is in the spring and summer. Snow can be found on the mountain for approximately 7 months out of the year.

Climate data for Ben Nevis (1883-1904: during existence of summit observatory)
Month	Jan	Feb	Mar	Apr	May	Jun	Jul	Aug	Sep	Oct	Nov	Dec	Year
Record high °C (°F)	9.1 (48.4)	7.8 (46.0)	7.8 (46.0)	11.4 (52.5)	13.3 (55.9)	19.1 (66.4)	17.8 (64.0)	17.5 (63.5)	17.0 (62.6)	14.0 (57.2)	11.1 (52.0)	7.2 (45.0)	19.1 (66.4)
Mean daily maximum °C (°F)	−2.5 (27.5)	−2.8 (27.0)	−2.6 (27.3)	−0.6 (30.9)	2.6 (36.7)	6.4 (43.5)	7.1 (44.8)	6.4 (43.5)	5.4 (41.7)	1.4 (34.5)	0.1 (32.2)	−1.9 (28.6)	1.6 (34.9)
Daily mean °C (°F)	−4.4 (24.0)	−4.6 (23.8)	−4.4 (24.0)	−2.4 (27.6)	0.6 (33.0)	4.3 (39.7)	5.1 (41.1)	4.7 (40.4)	3.3 (38.0)	−0.3 (31.4)	−1.7 (28.9)	−3.8 (25.2)	−0.3 (31.4)
Mean daily minimum °C (°F)	−6.2 (20.8)	−6.4 (20.5)	−6.3 (20.7)	−4.3 (24.3)	−1.6 (29.1)	2.1 (35.8)	3.1 (37.6)	2.9 (37.2)	1.4 (34.5)	−2.1 (28.2)	−3.5 (25.7)	−5.5 (22.1)	−2.2 (28.0)
Record low °C (°F)	−17.4 (0.7)	−16.8 (1.8)	−15.8 (3.6)	−11.5 (11.3)	−9.8 (14.4)	−5.1 (22.8)	−3.2 (26.2)	−2.8 (27.0)	−7.6 (18.3)	−9.8 (14.4)	−12.1 (10.2)	−13.8 (7.2)	−17.4 (0.7)
Average precipitation mm (inches)	469.8 (18.50)	342.0 (13.46)	378.9 (14.92)	237.2 (9.34)	204.4 (8.05)	193.7 (7.63)	269.8 (10.62)	331.3 (13.04)	391.6 (15.42)	397.8 (15.66)	394.8 (15.54)	492.3 (19.38)	4,103.8 (161.57)
Average precipitation days (≥ 1.0 mm)	22.4	16.8	20.1	16.5	17.0	16.1	21.0	22.0	20.0	21.9	20.4	21.3	235.3
Mean monthly sunshine hours	22.4	42.3	54.7	80.4	116.3	127.0	84.8	58.1	62.3	41.8	27.8	18.0	735.9
Percentage possible sunshine	10	16	15	19	23	22	16	13	16	13	11	9	16
Source 1: CEDA Archive
Source 2: Royal Society of Edinburgh (mean temp and sunshine 1884-1903)

== Geology ==
Ben Nevis is all that remains of a Devonian volcano that met a cataclysmic end in the Carboniferous period around 350 million years ago. Evidence near the summit shows light-coloured granite (which had cooled in subterranean chambers several kilometres beneath the surface) lies among dark basaltic lavas (that form only on the surface). The two lying side by side is evidence the huge volcano collapsed in on itself creating an explosion comparable to Thera (2nd millennium BC) or Krakatoa (1883). The mountain is now all that remains of the imploded inner dome of the volcano. Its form has been extensively shaped by glaciation.

Research has shown igneous rock from the Devonian period (around 400 million years ago) intrudes into the surrounding metamorphic schists; the intrusions take the form of a series of concentric ring dikes. The innermost of these, known as the Inner Granite, constitutes the southern bulk of the mountain above Lochan Meall an t-Suidhe, and also the neighbouring ridge of Càrn Mòr Dearg; Meall an t-Suidhe forms part of the Outer Granite, which is redder in colour. The summit dome itself, together with the steep northern cliffs, is composed of andesite and basaltic lavas.

== History ==
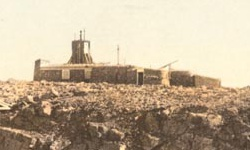
An undated photograph of the Ben Nevis observatory (1883–1904) and 'hotel' (hostel). The hotel began as a spare-room-for-hire within the observatory and remained open until 1916.

The first recorded ascent of Ben Nevis was made on 17 August 1771 by James Robertson, an Edinburgh botanist, who was in the region to collect botanical specimens. Another early ascent was in 1774 by John Williams, who provided the first account of the mountain's geological structure. John Keats climbed the mountain in 1818, comparing the ascent to "mounting ten St. Pauls without the convenience of a staircase". The following year William MacGillivray, who was later to become a distinguished naturalist, reached the summit only to find "fragments of earthen and glass ware, chicken bones, corks, and bits of paper". It was not until 1847 that Ben Nevis was confirmed by the Ordnance Survey as the highest mountain in Britain and Ireland, ahead of its rival Ben Macdui.

A meteorological observatory on the summit was first proposed by the Scottish Meteorological Society (SMS) in the late-1870s, at a time when similar observatories were being built around the world to study the weather at high altitude. In the summer of 1881, Clement Lindley Wragge climbed the mountain daily to make observations (earning him the nickname "Inclement Rag"), leading to the opening on 17 October 1883 of a permanent observatory run by the SMS. The building was staffed full-time until 1904, when it was closed due to inadequate funding. The twenty years worth of readings still provide the most comprehensive set of data on mountain weather in Great Britain.

In September 1894, C. T. R. Wilson was employed at the observatory for a couple of weeks as temporary relief for one of the permanent staff. During this period, he witnessed a Brocken spectre and glory, caused by the sun casting a shadow on a cloud below the observer. He subsequently tried to reproduce these phenomena in the laboratory, resulting in his invention of the cloud chamber, used to detect ionising radiation.

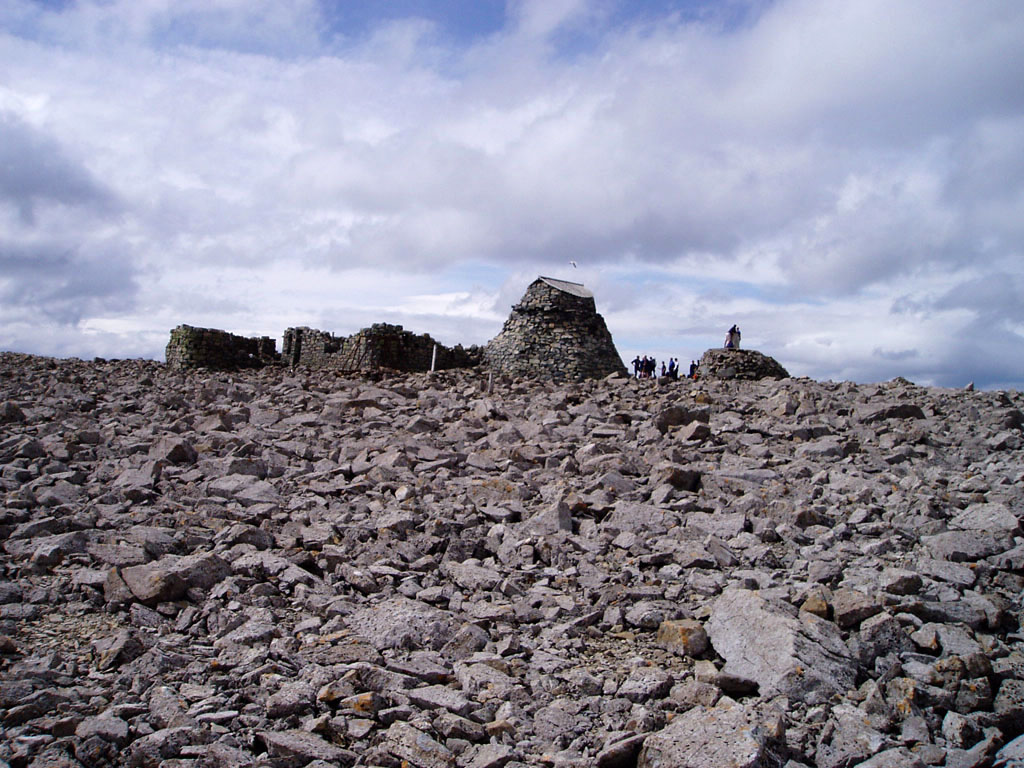
The summit survival shelter (centre) atop the ruined observatory. The squat summit cairn (right) has a trig point.

The ruins of the observatory can still be seen on the summit. An emergency shelter has been built on top of the observatory tower for the benefit of those caught out by bad weather.

The first path to the summit was built at the same time as the observatory and was designed to allow ponies to carry up supplies, with a maximum gradient of one in five. The opening of the path and the observatory made the ascent of the mountain increasingly popular, all the more so after the arrival of the West Highland Railway in Fort William in 1894. Around this time the first of several proposals was made for a rack railway to the summit, none of which came to fruition.

In 1911, an enterprising Ford dealer named Henry Alexander ascended the mountain in a Model T as a publicity stunt. The ascent took five days, and the descent just one day. Part of the descent can be seen on film that is available in the archives of the British Film Institute. A statue of Alexander and the car was unveiled in Fort William in 2018.

In 2000, the Ben Nevis Estate, comprising all of the south side of the mountain including the summit, was bought by the Scottish conservation charity the John Muir Trust.

On 17 May 2006, a piano that had been buried under one of the cairns on the peak was uncovered by the John Muir Trust, which owns much of the mountain. The piano is believed to have been carried up for charity by removal men from Dundee over 20 years earlier.

== Outdoor recreation ==
=== Hiking and climbing ===
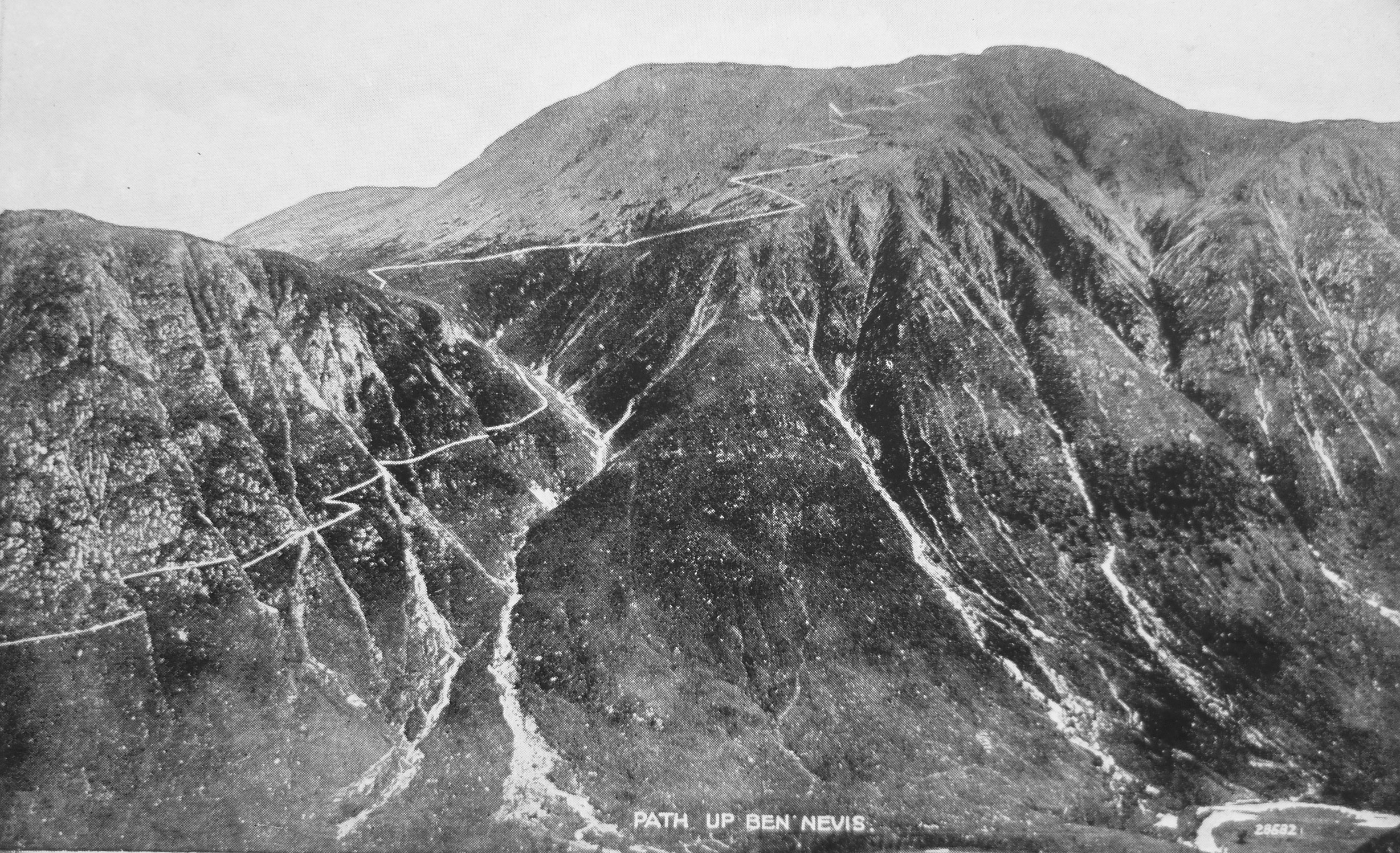
An old postcard view showing the path up Ben Nevis

Ben Nevis is a popular hiking destination, with 150,000 people a year visiting the peak.

The 1883 Pony Track to the summit (also known as the Ben Path, the Mountain Path or the Tourist Route) remains the simplest and most popular route of ascent. It begins at Achintee on the east side of Glen Nevis about 2 km (1.2 mi) from Fort William town centre, at around 20 metres (66 feet) above sea level. Bridges from the Visitor Centre and the youth hostel now allow access from the west side of Glen Nevis. The path climbs steeply to the saddle by Lochan Meall an t-Suidhe (colloquially known as the 'Halfway Lochan') at 570 m, then ascends the remaining 700 metres (2,300 feet) up the stony west flank of Ben Nevis in a series of zig-zags.

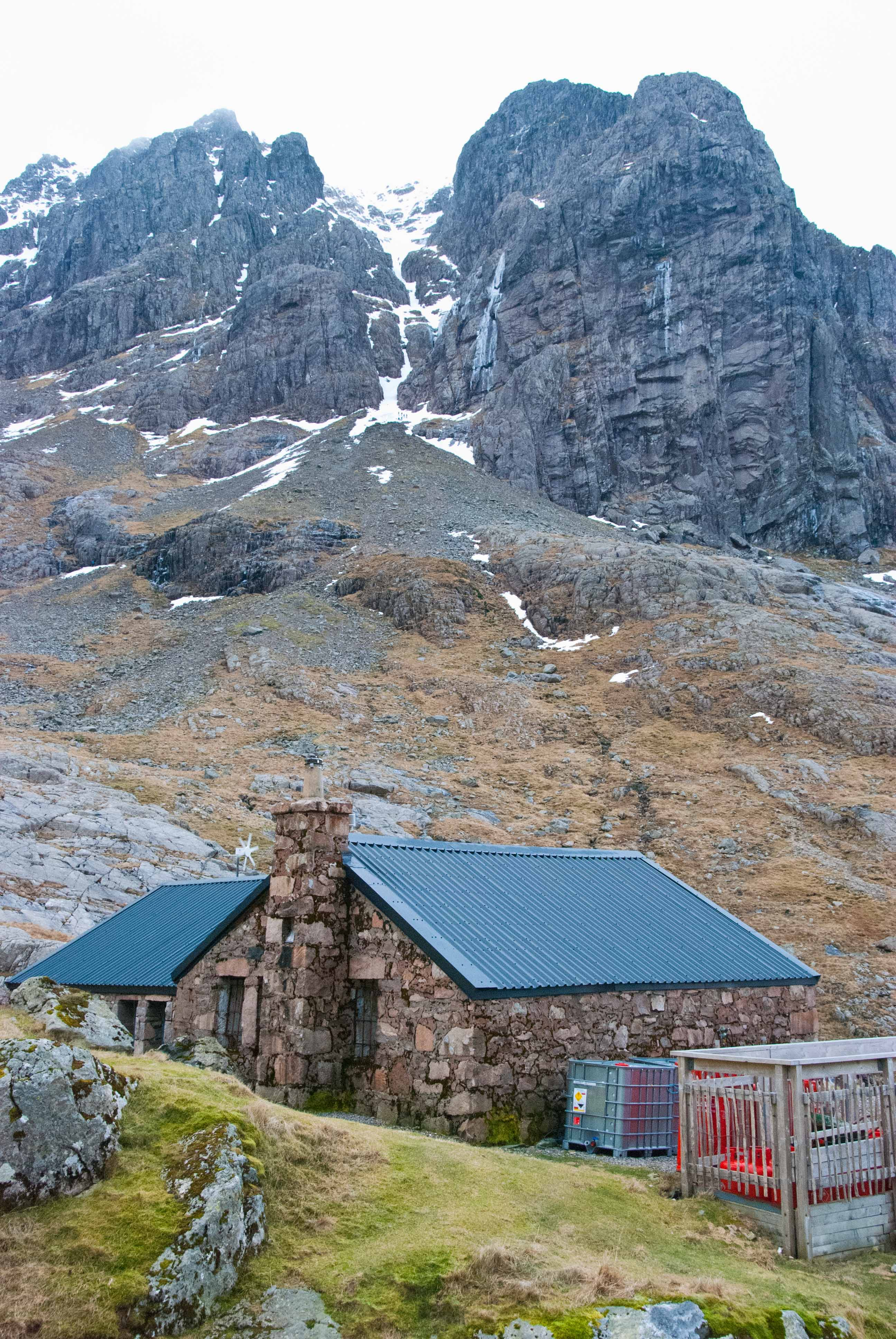
Charles Inglis Clark Memorial Hut with the Carn Dearg Buttress behind

A route popular with experienced hillwalkers starts at Torlundy, a few miles north-east of Fort William on the A82 road, and follows the path alongside the Allt a' Mhuilinn. It can also be reached from Glen Nevis by following the Pony Track as far as Lochan Meall an t-Suidhe, then descending slightly to the Charles Inglis Clark Memorial Hut (known as the CIC Hut), a private mountain hut 680 metres (2,230 ft) above sea level, owned by the Scottish Mountaineering Club The route then ascends Càrn Mòr Dearg and continues along the Càrn Mòr Dearg Arête ("CMD Arête") before climbing steeply to the summit of Ben Nevis. This route involves a total of 1,500 metres (4,900 feet) of ascent and requires modest scrambling ability and a head for heights. In common with other approaches on this side of the mountain, it has the advantage of giving an extensive view of the cliffs of the north face, which are hidden from the Pony Track.

The north face of Ben Nevis is riven with buttresses, ridges, towers and pinnacles, and contains many classic scrambles and rock climbs. It is of major importance for British winter climbing, with many of its routes holding snow often until late April. It was one of the first places in Scotland to receive the attention of serious mountaineers; a partial ascent and, the following day, a complete descent of Tower Ridge in early September 1892 is the earliest documented climbing expedition on Ben Nevis. (It was not climbed from bottom to top in entirety for another two years). The Scottish Mountaineering Club's Charles Inglis Clark hut was built below the north face in Coire Leis in 1929. Because of its remote location, it is said to be the only genuine alpine hut in Britain.

Tower Ridge is the longest of the north face's four main ridges, with around 600 metres (2,000 feet) of ascent. It is not technically demanding (its grade is Difficult), and most pitches can be tackled unroped by competent climbers, but it is committing and very exposed. Castle Ridge (Moderate), the northernmost of the main ridges, is an easier scramble, while Observatory Ridge (Very Difficult), the closest ridge to the summit, is "technically the hardest of the Nevis ridges in summer and winter". Between the Tower and Observatory Ridges are the Tower and Gardyloo Gullies; the latter takes its name from the cry of "garde à l'eau" (French for "watch out for the water") formerly used in Scottish cities as a warning when householders threw their waste out of a tenement window into the street. The gully's top wall was the refuse pit for the summit observatory.

The north face contains dozens of graded rock climbs along its entire length, with particular concentrations on the Càrn Dearg Buttress (below the Munro top of Càrn Dearg NW) and around the North-east Buttress and Observatory Ridge. Classic rock routes include Rubicon Wall on Observatory Buttress (Severe) – whose second ascent in 1937, when it was considered the hardest route on the mountain, is described by W. H. Murray in Mountaineering in Scotland – and, on Càrn Dearg, Centurion and The Bullroar (both HVS), Torro (E2), and Titan's Wall (E3), these four described in the SMC's guide as among "the best climbs of their class in Scotland".

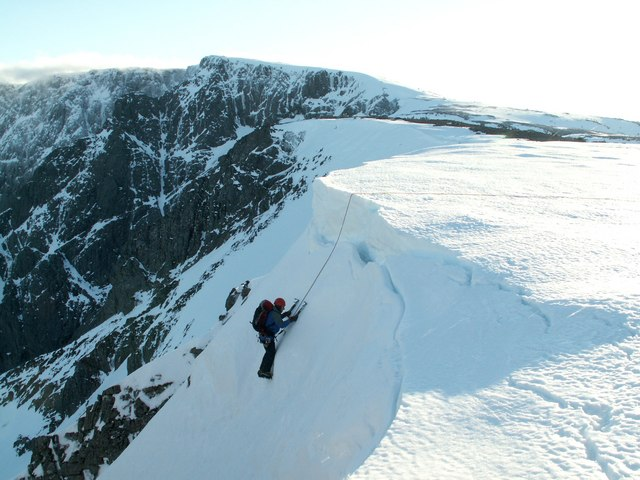
An ice-climber exiting Number Five Gully (450m I). Tower Gap can be discerned in the background.

Many seminal lines were recorded before the First World War by pioneering Scottish climbers like J. N. Collie, Willie Naismith, Harold Raeburn, and William and Jane Inglis Clark. Other classic routes were put up by G. Graham Macphee, Dr James H. B. Bell and others between the Wars; these include Bell's "Long Climb", at 1,400 ft (430 m) reputedly the longest sustained climb on the British mainland. In summer 1943 conscientious objector Brian Kellett made a phenomenal seventy-four repeat climbs and seventeen first ascents including fourteen solos, returning in 1944 to add fifteen more new lines, eleven solo, including his eponymous HVS on Gardyloo buttress. Much more recently, an extreme and as yet ungraded climb on Echo Wall was completed by Dave MacLeod in 2008 after two years of preparation.

The north face is also one of Scotland's foremost venues for winter mountaineering and ice climbing and holds snow until quite late in the year; in a good year, routes may remain in winter condition until mid-spring. Most of the possible rock routes are also suitable as winter climbs, including the four main ridges; Tower Ridge, for example, is grade IV on the Scottish winter grade, having been upgraded in 2009 by the Scottish Mountaineering Club after requests by the local Mountain Rescue Team, there being numerous benightments and incidents every winter season.

In February 1960 James R. Marshall and Robin Clark Smith recorded six major new ice routes in only eight days including Orion Direct (V,5 400m); this winter version of Bell's Long Climb was "the climax of a magnificent week's climbing by Smith and Marshall, and the highpoint of the step-cutting era".

=== Hill running ===
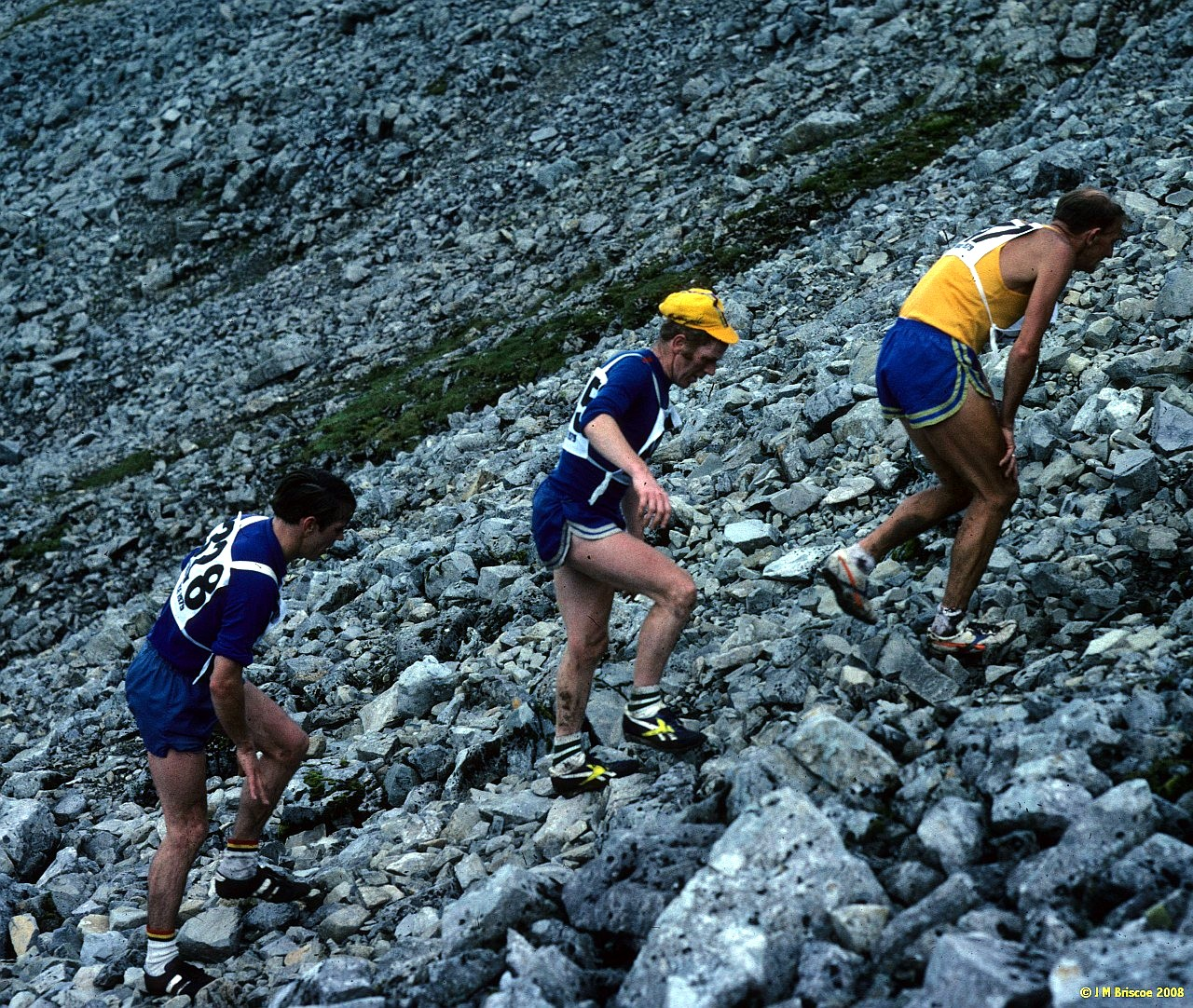
1979 Ben Nevis Race

The history of hill running on Ben Nevis dates back to 1895. William Swan, a barber from Fort William, made the first recorded timed ascent up the mountain on or around 27 September of that year, when he ran from the old post office in Fort William to the summit and back in 2 hours 41 minutes. The following years saw several improvements on Swan's record, but the first competitive race was held on 3 June 1898 under Scottish Amateur Athletic Association rules. Ten competitors ran the course, which started at the Lochiel Arms Hotel in Banavie and was thus longer than the route from Fort William; the winner was 21-year-old Hugh Kennedy, a gamekeeper at Tor Castle, who finished (coincidentally with Swan's original run) in 2 hours 41 minutes.

Regular races were organised until 1903, when two events were held; these were the last for 24 years, perhaps due to the closure of the summit observatory the following year. The first was from Achintee, at the foot of the Pony Track, and finished at the summit; It was won in just over an hour by Ewen MacKenzie, the observatory roadman. The second race ran from new Fort William post office, and MacKenzie lowered the record to 2 hours 10 minutes, a record he held for 34 years.

The Ben Nevis Race has been run in its current form since 1937. It now takes place on the first Saturday in September every year, with a maximum of 500 competitors taking part. It starts and finishes at the Claggan Park football ground on the outskirts of Fort William, and is 14 kilometres (8.7 mi) long with 1,340 metres (4,400 ft) of ascent. Due to the seriousness of the mountain environment, entry is restricted to those who have completed three hill races, and runners must carry waterproofs, a hat, gloves and a whistle; anyone who has not reached the summit after two hours is turned back. As of 2018, the record for the men's race has stood unbroken since 1984, when Kenny Stuart of Keswick Athletic Club won with a time of 1:25:34. The record for the women's race of 1:43:01 was set in 2018 by Victoria Wilkinson.

=== Extreme sports ===
Ben Nevis is becoming popular with ski mountaineers and boarders. The Red Burn (Allt Coire na h-Urcaire) just to the North of the tourist path gives the easiest descent, but most if not all of the easier gullies on the North Face have been skied, as has the slope once adorned by the abseil poles into Coire Leis. No 4 gully is probably the most skied. Although Tower scoop makes it a no-fall zone, Tower Gully is becoming popular, especially in May and June when there is spring snow.

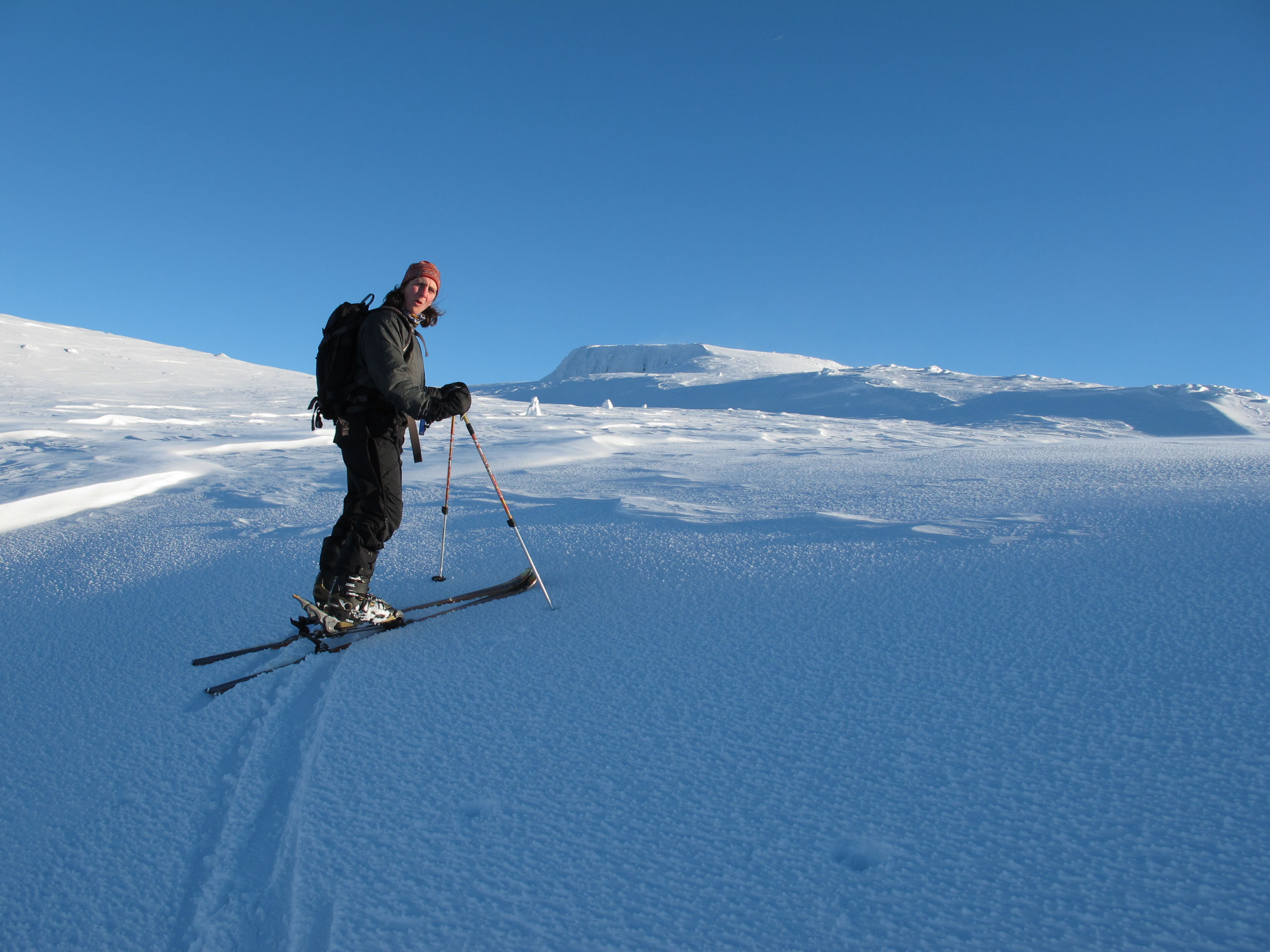
A skier skinning towards the summit

In 2018 Jöttnar pro team member Tim Howell BASE jumped off Ben Nevis which was covered by BBC Scotland.

In May 2019, a team of highliners completed a crossing above the Gardyloo Gully, a new altitude record for the UK. Also in May 2019, a team of 12, led by Dundee artist Douglas Roulston carried a 1.5-metre (4.9-foot) tall statue of the DC Thomson character Oor Wullie to the top of the mountain. The statue, which had been painted by Roulston with a 360-degree scene of the view from the summit was later sold at the Oor Wullie Big Bucket Trail charity auction to raise money for a number of Scottish children's charities.

Ben Nevis is one of the three mountains climbed in the National Three Peaks Challenge, where participants aim to climb Ben Nevis, Scafell Pike and Snowdon, often within 24 hours and using motor transport between them. The total height climbed is 3,064 m (10,052 ft) and the distance walked 23 miles (37 km), with about 460 miles (740 km) of driving. It has been estimated that some 30,000 people attempt the challenge each year, often as part of organised groups, and the impact on the local areas has been criticised. Various records have been set for the challenge, including James Forrest's fastest self-supported completion in 16 days, 13 hours, 59 mins in 2021 and Trish Patterson's fastest female completion on foot, with support, in 5 days 21 hours 11 mins, in 2026. In 2022 the Nevis Landscape Trust introduced a registration system for charity events on Ben Nevis.

=== Safety ===
Ben Nevis's popularity, climate and complex topography contribute to a high number of mountain rescue incidents resulting in several deaths annually on Ben Nevis. There have been over 100 fatalities recorded on the mountain since record keeping began in 1849. Fatalities on the mountain occur most regularly due to avalanches and climbing accidents on more difficult routes. In March 2025, a 22-year-old climber died after falling in a climbing accident in the Moonlight Gully in challenging weather conditions.

Avalanches occur regularly on Ben Nevis in the winter season. In December 1998, an avalanche on Aonach Mor swept away a group of 7 climbers resulting in the deaths of four of the climbers, whilst three of them survived after being trapped under the snow for 16 hours. Two days after this avalanche on Aonach Mor a fifth climber died on Ben Nevis after slipping on the ice. Two avalanches occurred on Ben Nevis in 2009 and 2016, causing the deaths of two people on each occasion. In another two avalanches that occurred in 1970 and 2019, three people died on each occasion. An experienced climber died in an avalanche on the north face of the mountain in 2022.

==== Navigation ====
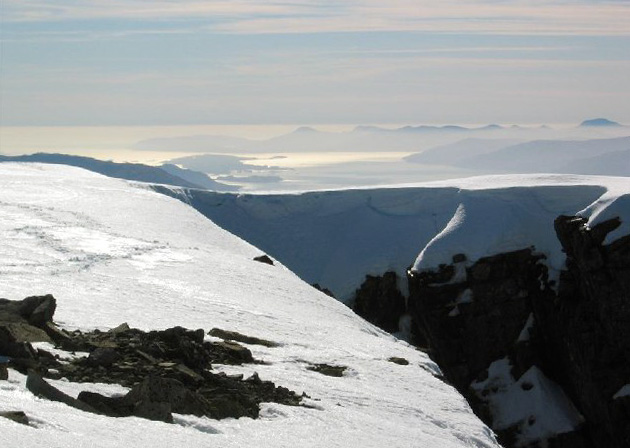
View south-west from the summit in early April. When the cliff edges are corniced, accurate navigation is critical.

Some incidents arise over difficulties in navigating to or from the summit, especially in poor visibility. The problem stems from the fact that the summit plateau is roughly kidney-shaped and surrounded by cliffs on three sides; the danger is particularly accentuated when the main path is obscured by snow. Two precise compass bearings taken in succession are necessary to navigate from the summit cairn to the west flank, from where a descent can be made on the Pony Track in relative safety.

In the late 1990s, Lochaber Mountain Rescue Team erected two posts on the summit plateau to assist walkers attempting the descent in foggy conditions. These posts were subsequently cut down by climbers, sparking controversy in mountaineering circles on the ethics of such additions. Critics argued that cairns and posts are an unnecessary man-made intrusion into the natural landscape, which create a false sense of security and could lessen mountaineers' sense of responsibility for their own safety.

In 2009, the Nevis Partnership moved and erected a number of 6-foot (1.8 m)-tall cairns on the summit plateau to aid navigation. Subsequently, the John Muir Trust cleared a number of smaller informal cairns in 2016 which had been erected by visitors, which were seen as dangerous as they could confuse walkers using them for navigation.

== In popular culture ==
The Ben Nevis Distillery is a single malt whisky distillery at the foot of the mountain, near Victoria Bridge to the north of Fort William. Founded in 1825 by John McDonald (known as "Long John"), it is one of the oldest licensed distilleries in Scotland, and is a popular visitor attraction in Fort William. The water used to make the whisky comes from the Allt a' Mhuilinn, the stream that flows from Ben Nevis's northern corrie. "Ben Nevis" 80/‒ organic ale is, by contrast, brewed in Bridge of Allan near Stirling.

Ben Nevis was the name of a White Star Line packet ship which in 1854 carried the group of immigrants who were to become the Wends of Texas. At least another eight vessels have carried the name since then.

A mountain in Svalbard is also named Ben Nevis, after the Scottish peak. It is 922 metres (3,025 feet) high and is south of the head of Raudfjorden, Albert I Land, in the northwestern part of the island of Spitsbergen. Hung Fa Chai, a 489-metre (1,604-foot) hill in Northeast New Territories of Hong Kong was given the name Ben Nevis by British surveyors in 1901.

Wee Ben Nevis was a character appearing in The Beano comic for a few years from 1974, drawn by Vic Neill, in a feature described by Auberon Waugh as having "strong undertones of Scottish Nationalism by its untrue suggestion that Scotsmen have superhuman strength despite their diminutive stature".

== Panorama ==
In perfect viewing conditions the following Munros are visible (distances in miles, listed clockwise from north):

1. Toll Creagach, 0.2°, 35.4m
2. An Coileachan, 1.9°, 60.3m
3. Sgurr Fhuar-thuill, 2.9°, 45.2m
4. Sgurr a' Choire Ghlais, 4.8°, 44.9m
5. Carn nan Gobhar (Strathfarrar), 5.8°, 45.6m
6. Sgurr na Ruaidhe, 7.2°, 45.0m
7. Sron a' Choire Ghairbh, 10.9°, 14.8m
8. Meall na Teanga, 11.7°, 13.5m
9. Ben Wyvis, 14.4°, 63.0m
10. Carn Mor Dearg, 47.2°, 0.9m
11. Beinn Teallach, 50.5°, 15.1m
12. Geal Charn (Monadh Liath), 52.6°, 29.9m
13. Stob Poite Coire Ardair, 53.6°, 19.7m
14. Carn Sgulain, 53.7°, 38.6m
15. Carn Dearg (Monadh Liath), 53.9°, 35.0m
16. Creag Meagaidh, 54.6°, 18.6m
17. Aonach Mor, 54.9°, 2.0m
18. Beinn a' Chaorainn (Glen Spean), 55.4°, 16.1m
19. Cairn Gorm, 66.1°, 56.0m
20. Sgor Gaoith, 66.9°, 48.9m
21. Braeriach, 67.5°, 52.0m
22. Ben Macdui, 68.9°, 53.9m
23. Sgor an Lochain Uaine, 69.0°, 51.6m
24. Cairn Toul, 69.5°, 52.1m
25. Creag Pitridh, 69.9°, 20.9m
26. Meall Chuaich, 70.7°, 35.7m
27. Mullach Clach a' Bhlair, 70.8°, 46.4m
28. Monadh Mor, 70.9°, 50.0m
29. Geal Charn (Loch Laggan), 71.1°, 21.9m
30. Stob Choire Claurigh, 72.1°, 6.1m
31. Beinn Bhrotain, 72.5°, 50.7m
32. Beinn a' Chlachair, 74.7°, 19.4m
33. Carn na Caim, 75.4°, 32.4m
34. Carn an Fhidhleir, 77.6°, 46.6m
35. Stob Coire an Laoigh, 77.9°, 4.6m
36. Geal Charn (Drumochter), 78.2°, 27.1m
37. An Sgarsoch, 78.3°, 48.3m
38. Stob a' Choire Mheadhoin, 78.6°, 9.4m
39. Carn Dearg (Ben Alder), 78.7°, 21.2m
40. Lochnagar, 79.6°, 67.6m
41. Chno Dearg, 79.9°, 13.2m
42. Stob Coire Easain, 80.3°, 8.8m
43. Carn an t-Sagairt Mor, 80.3°, 65.2m
44. Carn a' Choire Bhoidheach, 80.4°, 66.4m
45. Geal Charn (Corrour), 81.1°, 19.0m
46. Aonach Beag (Corrour), 81.8°, 18.2m
47. Beinn Dearg (Atholl), 82.0°, 42.8m
48. Beinn Iutharn Mhor, 82.3°, 54.9m
49. Cairn of Claise, 83.2°, 63.5m
50. Aonach Beag (Ben Nevis), 83.3°, 1.9m
51. Beinn Eibhinn, 83.3°, 17.5m
52. Carn an Righ, 83.5°, 53.7m
53. Beinn Udlamain, 83.7°, 25.7m
54. Carn a' Chlamain, 84.0°, 46.6m
55. Glas Tulaichean, 84.4°, 55.0m
56. Beinn a' Ghlo, 86.0°, 50.0m
57. Ben Alder, 86.5°, 20.5m
58. Beinn na Lap, 92.1°, 13.1m
59. Sgor Gaibhre, 95.4°, 17.4m
60. Carn Dearg (Corrour), 99.0°, 15.9m
61. Schiehallion, 104.3°, 35.5m

== See also ==
- Holme Fen – The lowest point in the United Kingdom.
- Mountains and hills of Scotland
- National Three Peaks Challenge
- Northwest Spitsbergen National Park Norway - includes a mountain called Ben Nevis. Its height is 918 metres (3,012 feet) and it is located at Northwest Spitsbergen National Park
- The Remarkables, New Zealand – mountain range containing a peak also called Ben Nevis
- Scottish Highlands
- Scafell Pike
- Snowdon

== Bibliography ==
- Butterfield, Irvine (1986). The High Mountains of Britain and Ireland. London: Diadem Books. pp. 96–99. ISBN 978-0-906371-71-8.
- Crocket, Ken; Richardson, Simon (2009). Ben Nevis: Britain's Highest Mountain: 2nd Edition. The Scottish Mountaineering Trust. ISBN 978-1-907233-10-4.
- Hodgkiss, Peter (1994). The Central Highlands (5th ed.). Scottish Mountaineering Trust. pp. 116–134. ISBN 978-0-907521-44-0.
- Ordnance Survey (2002). Landranger 41: Ben Nevis (Map). ISBN 0-319-22641-7.
- Murray, W. H. (1977). The Companion Guide to the West Highlands of Scotland. London: Collins. pp. 218–221. ISBN 978-0-00-216813-7.
- Richardson, Simon (2002). Ben Nevis: Rock and Ice Climbs. The Scottish Mountaineering Trust. ISBN 978-0-907521-73-0.
