= Achintee, Fort William =

Coordinates: 56.81056°N 5.07166°W

Achintee: Scottish Gaelic: Achadh an t-Suidhe
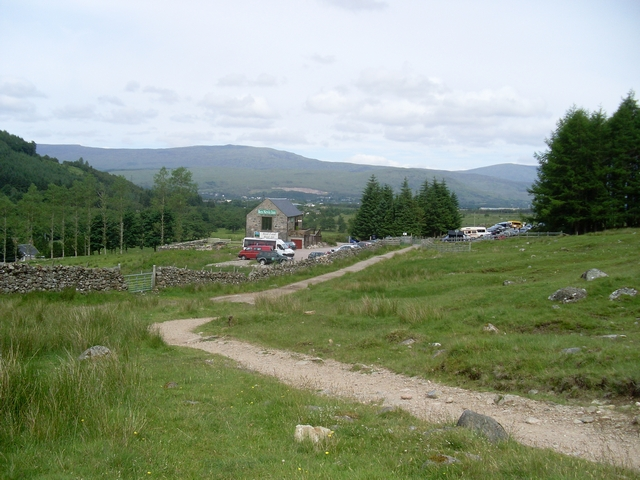
- Looking down the mountain path to the Ben Nevis Inn

- Location within the Lochaber area
- OS grid reference: NN125730
- Council area: Highland
- Country: Scotland
- Sovereign state: United Kingdom
- Postcode district: PH33 6
- Police: Scotland
- Fire: Scottish
- Ambulance: Scottish
- UK Parliament: Inverness, Skye and West Ross-shire
- Scottish Parliament: Skye, Lochaber and Badenoch

Achintee (Scottish Gaelic: Achadh an t-Suidhe) is a location in Glen Nevis in the Highland council area of Scotland. It is around 2 km south-east of Fort William and just to the east of the River Nevis.

Achintee is the starting point for the "Mountain Path", the most popular route up Ben Nevis. The Ben Nevis Inn is within Achintee, at the end of a minor road.

The name Achintee is from the Gaelic for "the field of the seat".
