= Monadh Mòr =

Coordinates: 57°1′37″N 3°45′2″W

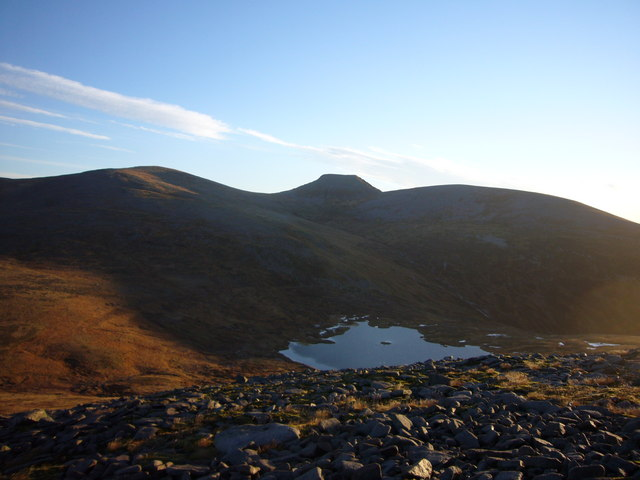
- Loch nan Stuirteag and Cairn Toul from North ridge of Monadh Mor

Highest point
- Elevation: 1,113 m (3,652 ft)
- Prominence: 138 m (453 ft)
- Listing: Munro

Naming
- English translation: The Big Hill
- Language of name: Gaelic

Geography
- OS grid: NN938942
- Topo map: OS Landranger 36

Monadh Mòr (Scottish Gaelic: Big Hill) is a mountain in the Cairngorms region of the Highlands of Scotland. A pass connects it with Beinn Bhrotain.

== See also ==
- Ben Nevis
- List of Munro mountains
- Mountains and hills of Scotland
