= Brian Pinder Kellett =

British rock climber

Brian Kellett
- Brian Kellett at Torlundy in 1943

Personal information
- Full name: Brian Pinder Kellett
- Nationality: British
- Born: 15 May 1914 Weymouth, Dorset, England
- Died: September 1944 (aged 30) Ben Nevis, Scotland

Brian Pinder Kellett (15 May 1914 – September 1944) was a British rock climber.

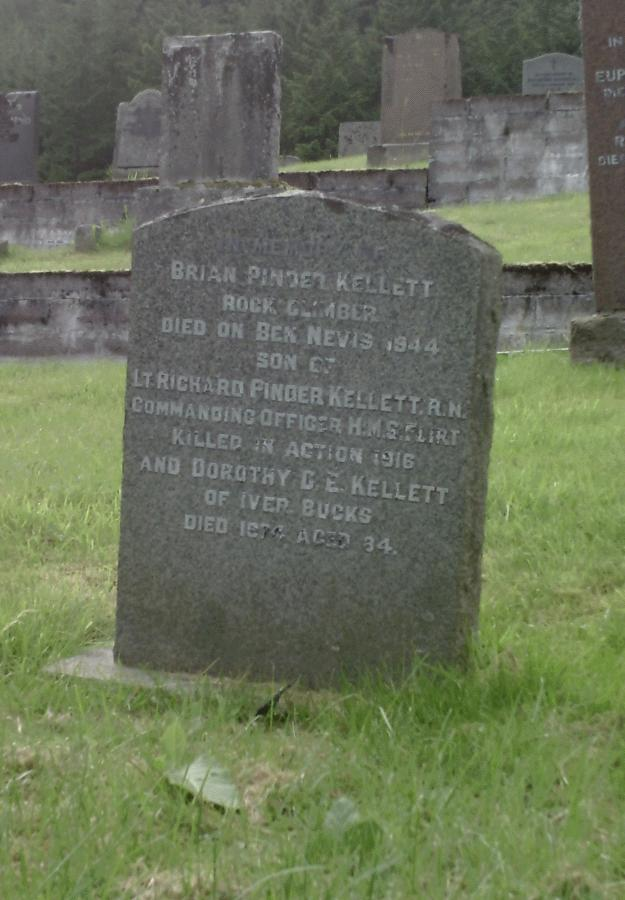
The memorial to British rock climber Brian Pinder Kellett (1914–1944) and his parents, in Glen Nevis (Highland Scotland). Over the last two years of his life Kellett pioneered many new routes on Ben Nevis.

== Life ==
Brian Kellett was born in 1914 in Weymouth, Dorset in South-West England. He was the son of Lt. Richard Pinder Kellett, whom he never knew; Kellett senior was killed commanding HMS Flirt in the battle of Dover (1916). The younger Kellett died with Nancy Forsyth in Castle Corrie on Ben Nevis during the first weekend in September 1944; the exact date is not known. He is buried in Glen Nevis.

=== Education and career ===
Kellett was educated at public schools in south-west England where he gained a reputation as a "perfect all-round sportsman", playing on the cricket and rugby teams and also representing them at boxing (oddly, given his subsequent pacifism). He was a strong chess player and his analytic mind led him initially to qualify in accountancy, but he left the profession in favour of physically demanding forestry work in Ennerdale in Cumbria where he began to climb more seriously than on his early forays on the Tors of Dartmoor. With the coming of the second World War Kellett refused to serve on grounds of conscience and was interned for two years. He eventually proposed serving with the forestry on Skye where he could climb on the magnificent Cuillin ridge, but was posted at Torlundy instead. Kellett was by all accounts industrious, "born to work the land", in the words of a co-worker, and now he could climb again, too: Torlundy is seven kilometres north of Ben Nevis, the highest mountain in the UK.

== Climbing ==
The north-east face of Ben Nevis is a two-kilometre-long meandering cliff whose most prominent features are Tower Ridge and Carn Dearg Buttress. The corrie between these (Coire na Ciste) is divided at the back by three major gullies, numbered Two, Three and Four. When Kellett arrived at the face in 1942, Number Two Gully had yet to receive a summer ascent, having defeated both Harold Raeburn ("doyen of Scottish mountaineers") and G. Graham Macphee, editor of the 1936 climber's guide. Kellett led the first ascent on 30 August with J. A. Dunster, who at one point was forced to shelter off-rope from screes loosed by Kellett above him; sixty years later, the 2002 climber's guide still warns that "in summer the gully has a fierce reputation and is best avoided" (its grade is VS). Nevertheless, Kellett's achievement in 1942 was soon to be surpassed by his relentless attention to the face over the following two years.

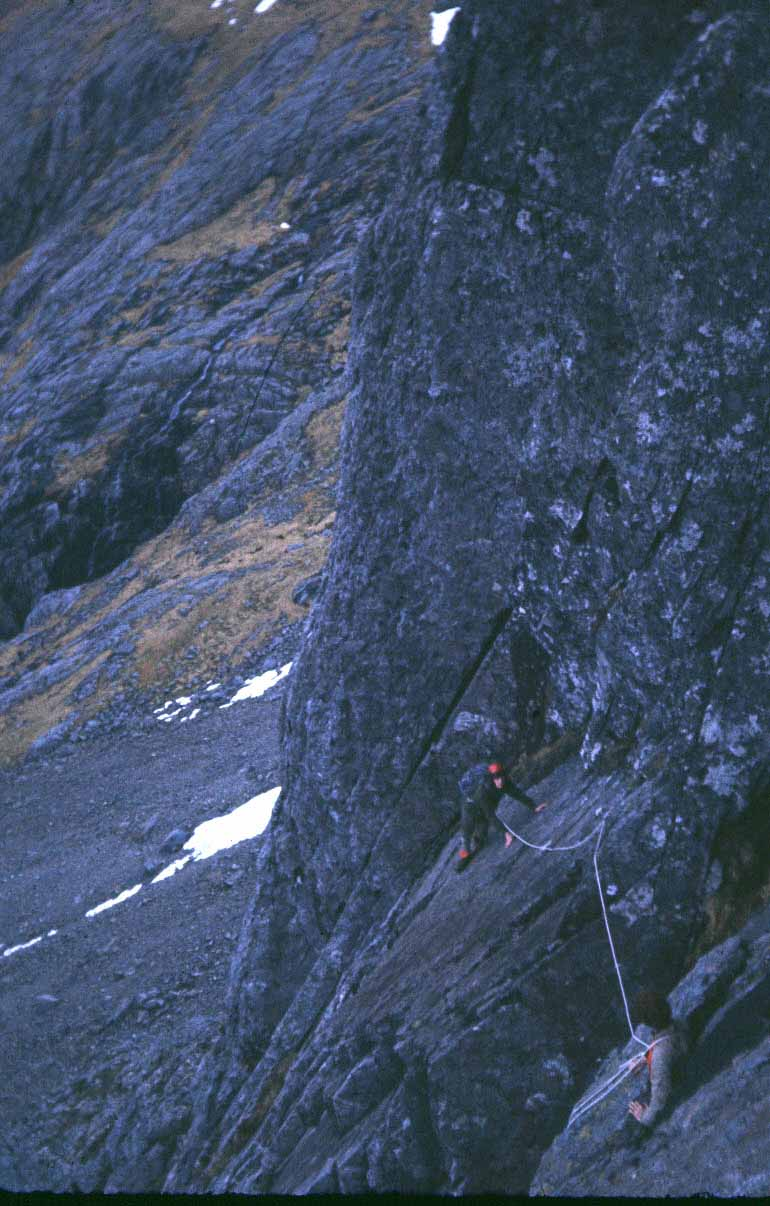
Climbers on Route 2 in the late sixties

=== First ascents ===
Kellett left an "unprecedented" legacy of new routes and variations on Ben Nevis in the summers of 1943 and 1944 (page references are to the SMC's 2002 Climbers' Guide, edited by Simon Richardson):

1943
Date	Ref	Added	To (vars)	Route (or variation)
22 May	p59	35m HSev	185m Sev	Main Overhang variation: Bayonet Route to First Platform, Northeast Buttress
29 May	p104	125m Diff		Lower East Wall Route, Tower Ridge East Face
9 June	p180	235m Sev		Route II, Carn Dearg Buttress (with W. A. (Arnot) Russell)
19 June	p116	55m VDiff	125m Diff	Left-Hand Chimney variation: 1931 Route, Secondary Tower Ridge
2 July	p197	100m Sev		Route A, Carn Dearg North Wall (now Kellett's North Wall Route)
10 July	p158	15m VDiff	120m Diff	Tower finish: Central Rib, Creag Coire na Ciste
18 July	p138	45m Sev	250m VDiff	Central Wall variation: Tower Face of the Comb
24 July	p118	180m Sev		Italian Climb, Tower Ridge West Face
24 July	p120	200m Easy		Broad Gully, Tower Ridge West Face
25 July	p171	150m VDiff		Right-Hand Chimney, Moonlight Gully Buttress (with G. (Gordon) Scott and E. M. Hanlon)
25 July	p162	75m VDiff		The Groove Climb, South Trident Buttress
25 July	pN/A	c.100m		1943 Route, South Trident Buttress (not in 2002 guide, but in 1954)
?? July	p134	140m VDiff		Comb Gully Buttress
1 August	p91	45m Sev	110m VDiff	Direct variation: Indicator Wall
10 August	p197	30m		Flake Chimney: Carn Dearg North Wall (now Kellett's North Wall Route)
11 August	p197	50m		Route B: Carn Dearg North Wall (with J. H. B. Bell and M. M. ("Nancy") Forsyth)
?? August	p70	90m Diff		V-Traverse continuation from The Basin (North-East Buttress) to Observatory Ridge
?? August?	p197	20m	50m	Route B Direct start: Carn Dearg North Wall

1944
Date	Ref	Added	To (vars)	Route (or variation)
17 June	p73	45m VSev	420m VSev	Beta Direct variation: The Long Climb
20 June	p65	275m VSev		Left-Hand Route, Minus Two Buttress (with R. L. and C. M. Plackett)
21 June	p109	215m Diff		Left-Hand Chimney, Douglas Boulder
22 June	p194	55m Sev	215m VDiff	Straight Chimney variation: Staircase Climb (with R. L. and C. M. Plackett)
22 June	p194	40m Diff	215m VDiff	Deep Chimney variation: Staircase Climb (with R. L. and C. M. Plackett)
8 July	p80	325m VDiff		West Face Lower Route, Observatory Ridge
16 July	p100	30m Mod		Tower Face Crack, Gardyloo Buttress
18 July	p109	150m Sev		Right-Hand Chimney, Douglas Boulder
20 July	p66	275m VSev		Right-Hand Route, Minus Two Buttress
22 July	p99	140m HVSev		Kellett's Route, Gardyloo Buttress
30 July	p161	125m Sev		1944 Route: lower tier, South Trident Buttress
30 July	p162	90m Sev		The Slab Climb: middle tier, South Trident Buttress
20 August	p200	c.30m Sev	275m VDiff	Direct start: Cousin's Buttress, Castle Corrie (shortened route by 15m)

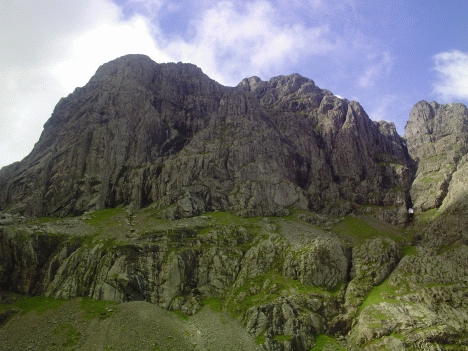
The north wall of Carn Dearg (Ben Nevis): this part of the mountain held a fatal fascination for Kellett.

== Accidents ==
Kellett suffered 3 significant falls before his fatal accident with Nancy Forsyth. Perhaps most remarkably in January 1943 he survived falling the length of Glover's Chimney from Tower Gap, a fall of about 300m, losing his ice axe but suffering no serious injury. After one of these falls J.H.B. Bell, a leading climber of his day, became concerned about Kellett's safety as a climber and voiced these concerns to Nancy Forsyth.

== Commemoration ==
His sister Lorna commissioned a memorial to Kellett and his father in Glen Nevis.
