= Melderskin =

Mountain in Vestland, Norway

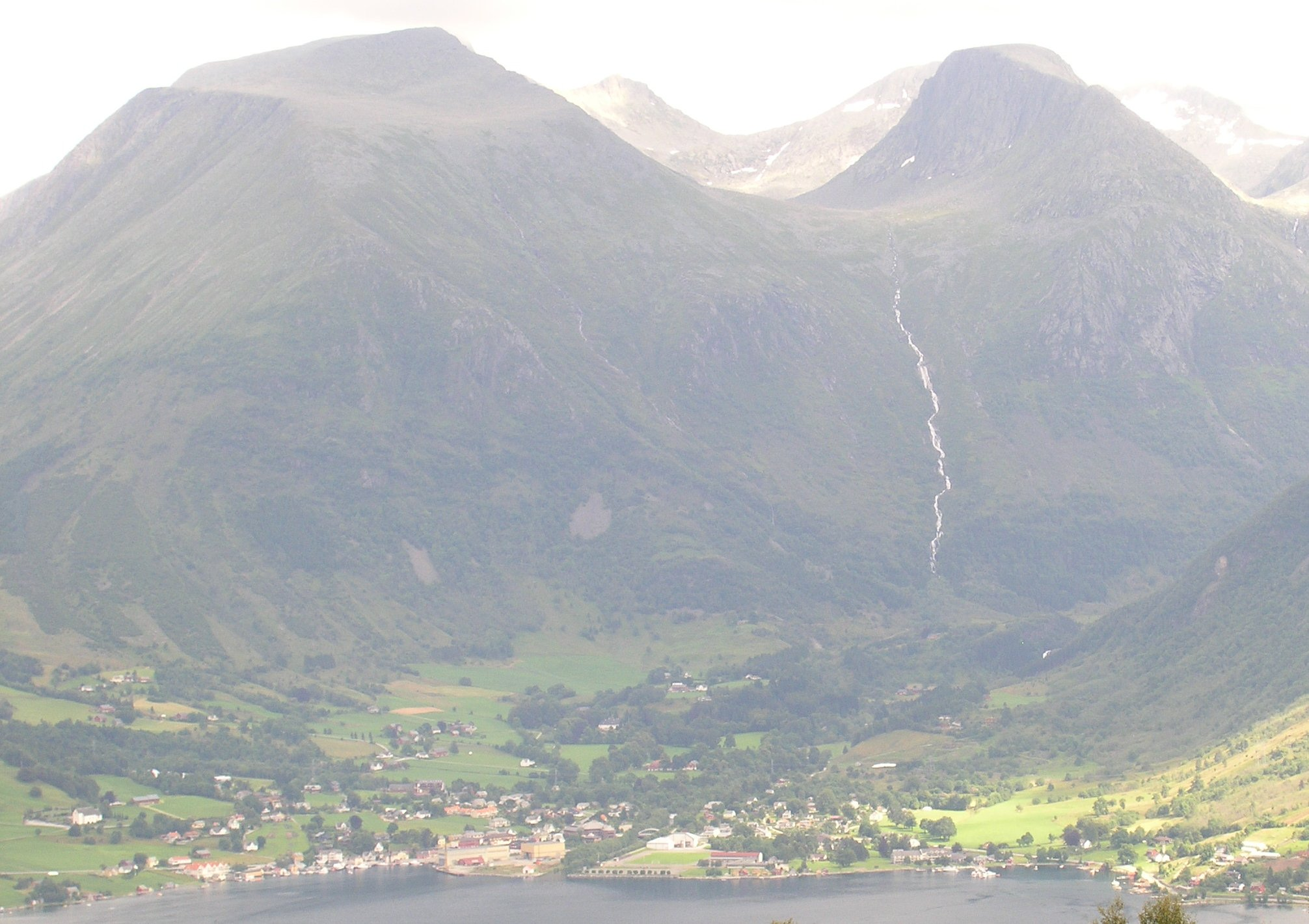
- View of the village of Rosendal under Melderskin (left) and Laurdalstind (1,307 meters above sea level).

Highest point
- Elevation: 1,426 m (4,678 ft)
- Prominence: 205 m (673 ft)
- Parent peak: Juklavasskruna
- Isolation: 3.8 km (2.4 mi)
- Coordinates: 60°00′22″N 6°04′58″E

Geography
- Location: Vestland, Norway
- Parent range: Scandinavian Mountains

Melderskin is a mountain peak in Kvinnherad Municipality in Vestland county, Norway. The 1,426-metre (4,678 ft) tall mountain lies about 3 kilometres (1.9 mi) northeast of the village of Rosendal and the Barony Rosendal. The mountain lies inside Folgefonna National Park.

South of the mountain peak lies a small U-shaped valley that has a small lake in it at an elevation of 964 metres (3,163 ft) above sea level. The small lake drains into a river with a large waterfall.

The mountain Ben Nevis is located in Scotland and it is the highest mountain in the United Kingdom. Melderskin is the nearest mountain that is higher than Ben Nevis, and therefore Melderskin defines the topographic isolation of Ben Nevis which lies 739 kilometres (459 miles) away.

== Name ==
The name comes from the Old Norse word meldr which means 'grain that is ground into flour' and skin which means "shine". The meaning then becomes something like "the mountain with a shiny layer of snow on top".
