= Bert Bissell =

Bert Bissell MBE (9 January 1902 – 2 November 1998) was a mountain climber and peace campaigner.

Born at Dudley, Worcestershire, in January 1902, he founded the Young Men's Bible Class at Vicar Street Methodist Church in the town in 1925. The bible class remained at the church for 83 years, relocating to nearby Dixons Green Methodist Church after 31 August 2008 due to the building's deteriorating condition in spite of local opposition to its closure.

Bissell, who worked as a probation officer, led a pilgrimage party from the Bible Class to the summit of Ben Nevis on VJ Day in 1945 and constructed a "Peace Cairn", in later years the subject of some controversy. The expedition from Dudley to Fort William was repeated annually thereafter, a tradition which continued for some 50 years and was revived in 2014.

At the age of 88, he opened Dudley's new Milking Bank Primary School on 6 November 1990, a year after it first opened to pupils.

He was the subject in 1995 of a biographical article by Stan Hill in The Blackcountryman magazine. In 1997 he published a book, "God's Mountaineer" (Methodist Publishing House, ISBN 1-85852-085-1).

He died in November 1998, aged 96, at Nethercrest Nursing Home in Netherton after fracturing his pelvis in a fall at his home in Selborne Road, Dudley the previous spring. His funeral was held at Vicar Street Methodist Church on 10 November and he was buried in the churchyard at Glen Nevis.

In 2001 a limited edition book, "Bert Bissell Remembered", with contributions by 60 local writers, was published by Fairway Folio. A monument to Bert Bissell stands in Coronation Gardens, Dudley.
