= Meall an t-Suidhe =

Mountain in Scotland

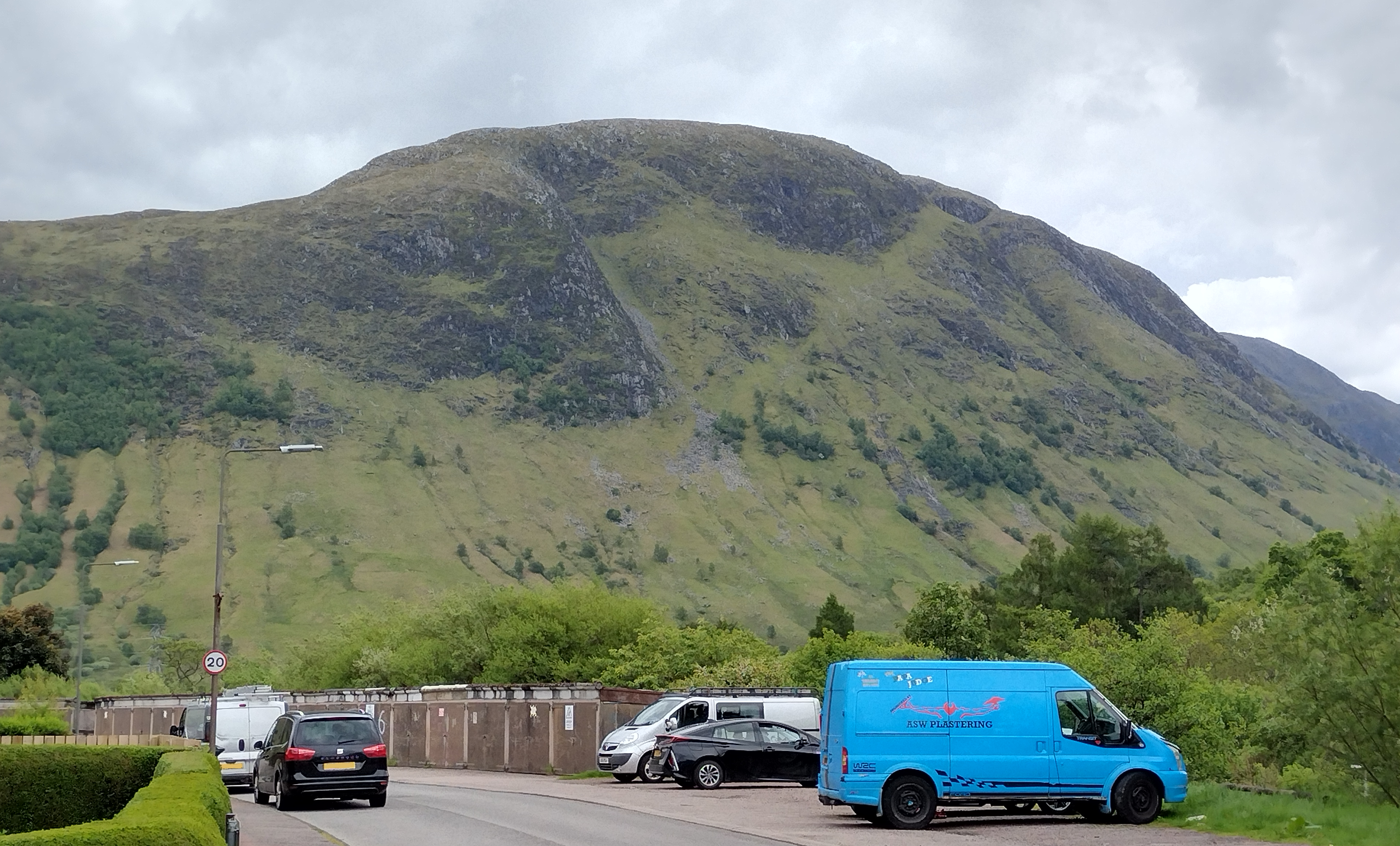
- The mountain as seen from Claggan (Fort William)

Highest point
- Elevation: 711 m (2,333 ft)
- Prominence: 146
- Listing: HuMP
- Coordinates: 56.8101355°N 5.0508785°W

Naming
- English translation: hill of the seat / hill of the rest
- Language of name: Scottish gaelic

Geography
- Location within Scotland
- Location: Highland, Scotland, United Kingdom
- Parent range: Grampian Mountains
- OS grid: NN 13943 72985

Climbing
- Easiest route: Hike from Glen Nevis

The Meall an t-Suidhe is a mountain in Scotland, located close to the Ben Nevis.

== Etymology ==
Meall an t-Suidhe is a gaelic toponym which can be translated as hill of the seat or hill of the rest.

== Features ==
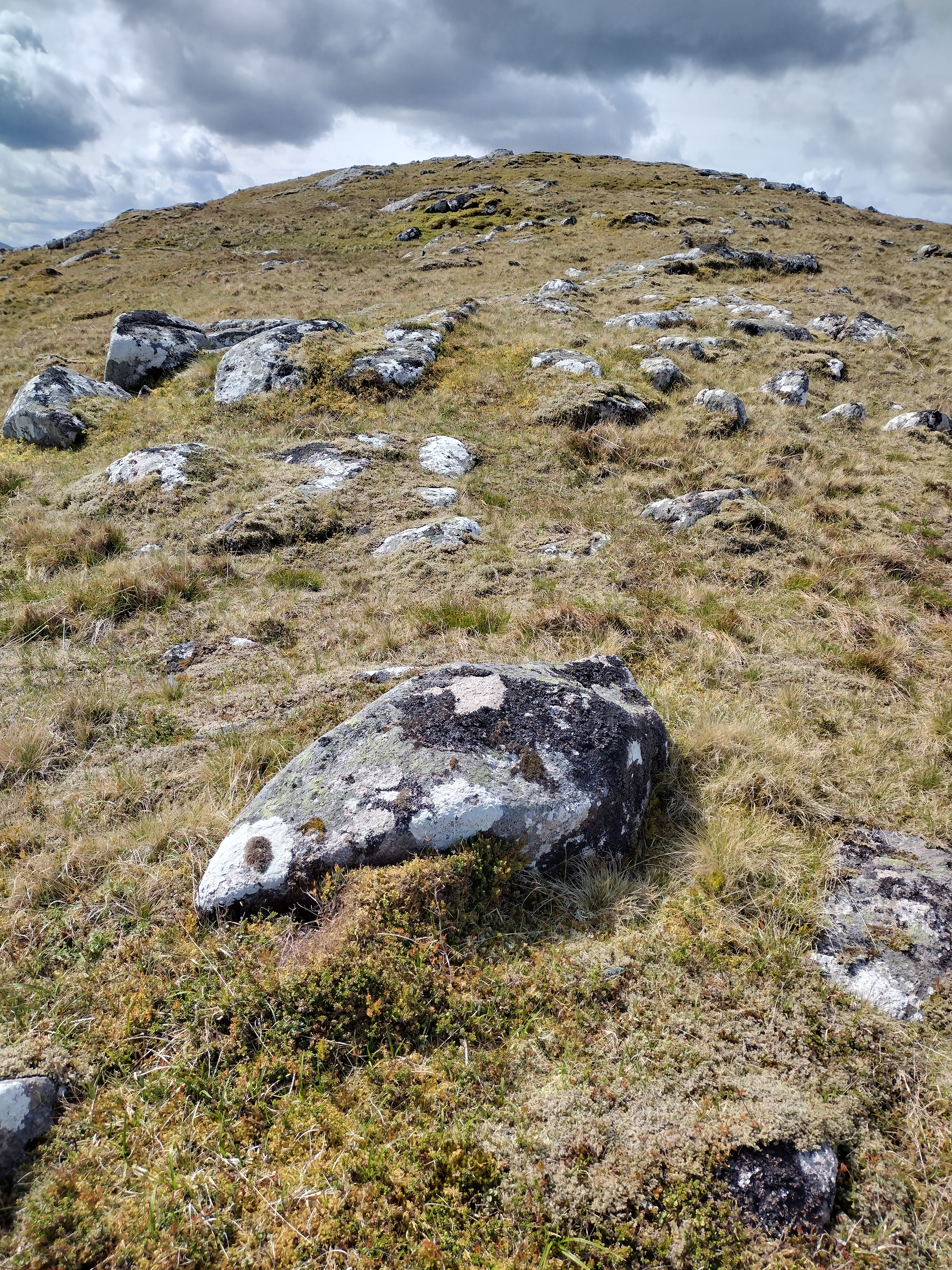
N ridge

Usually considered as the wesetern shoulder of the Ben Nevis system, the mountain is located on the W side of the Glen Nevis and overlooks the N outskirts of Fort William. The Meall an t-Suidhe is divided from the rest of the Ben Nevis group by a large and grassy saddle, mainly occupied by the Lochan Meall an t-Suidhe. The outflow of the lake is a stream named Allt Coire an Lochain which runs on the E flanks of Meall an-t Shuide, and joins the Allt a' Mhuilinn, a larger stream, just before its conflunence with the River Lochy. The summit of Meall an t-Suidhe is marked by a cairn. Because of its topographic prominence the mountain is classified as a HuMP. Its shape has been compared to a whale in repose, and remark that its green grassy E slopes form a pleasant contrast with the deep blue of the nearby lake.

== Geology ==
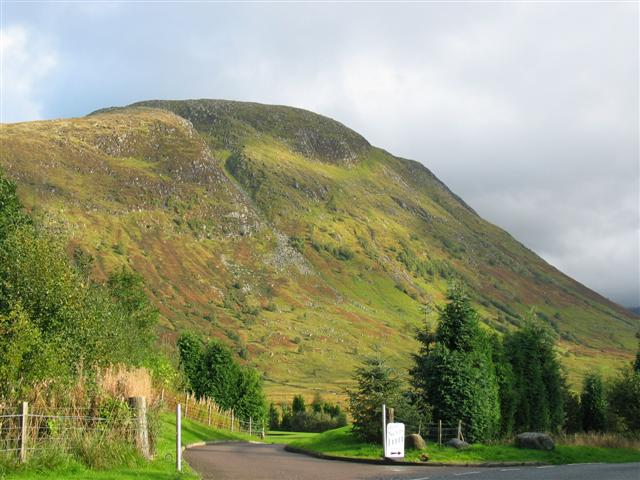
View from Auchitee road

The area of the Meall an t-Suidhe is crossed by a line taking apart two portions of the Ben Nevis granites; the innermost of the two portions is considered by geologists younger than the external one. These outer granites are often interrupted by porphyritic dykes.

== Access to the summit ==
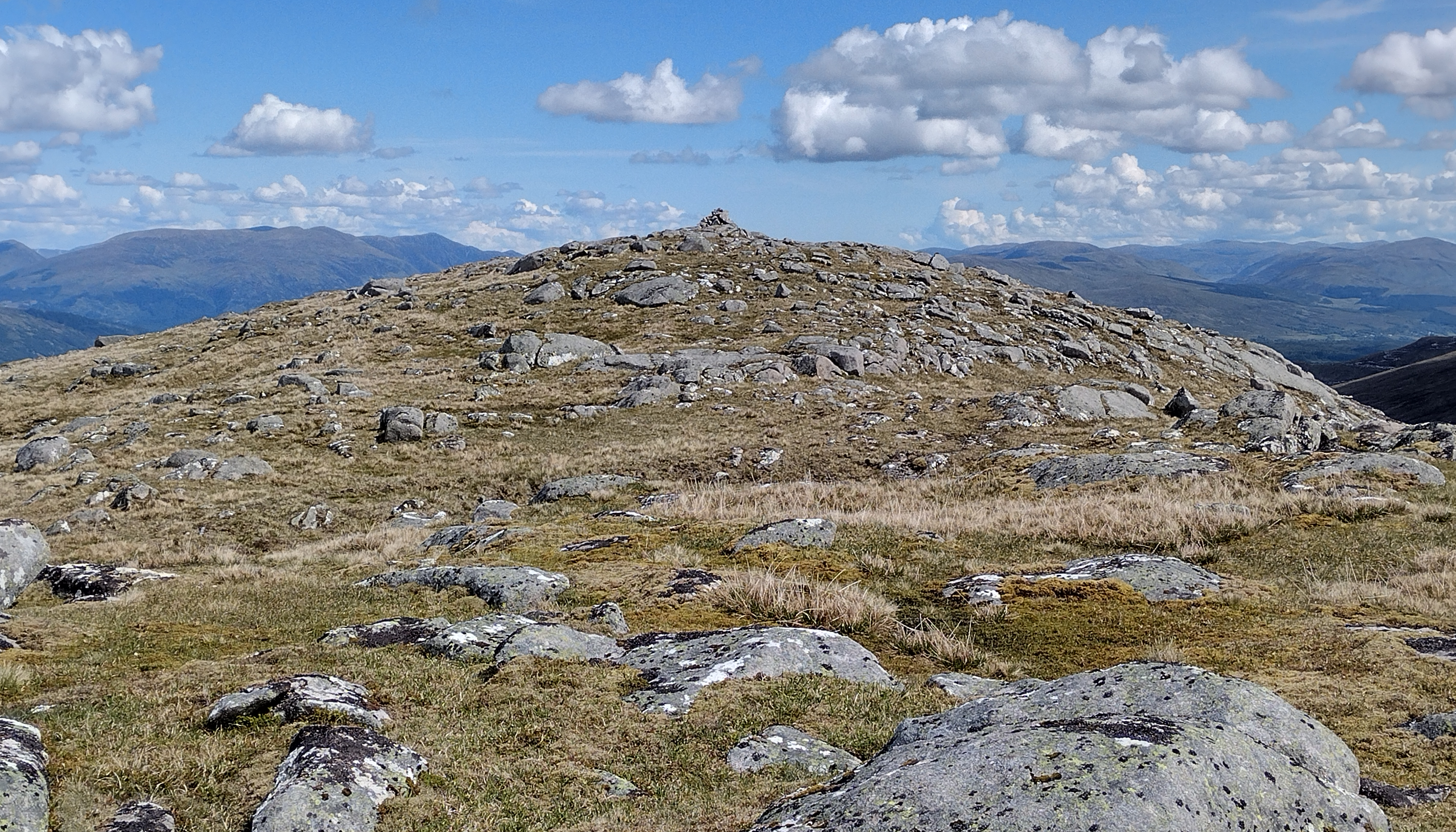
Summit dome

The mountain is located close to the pony trail, the most frequented route to the Ben Nevis. Some guidebooks propose the ascent to its summit as an easier and less demanding alternative to the Ben Nevis. They also note that Meall an t-Suidhe is peaceful and is more often free from clouds than its more imposing and crowded neighbour. Getting to the top can roughly take less than 6 hours' walking (there and back) from the Glen Nevis visitor centre. The hike with good weather is not difficult but in its last part involves walking out of waymarked footpaths.

== Environment and landscape conservation ==
The mountain is included into the Ben Nevis and Glen Coe National Scenic Area, one of the National scenic areas established in order to protect Scottish finest scenery and to ensure its protection from inappropriate development.

== Panorama ==
Media related to Meall an t-Suidhe at Wikimedia Commons

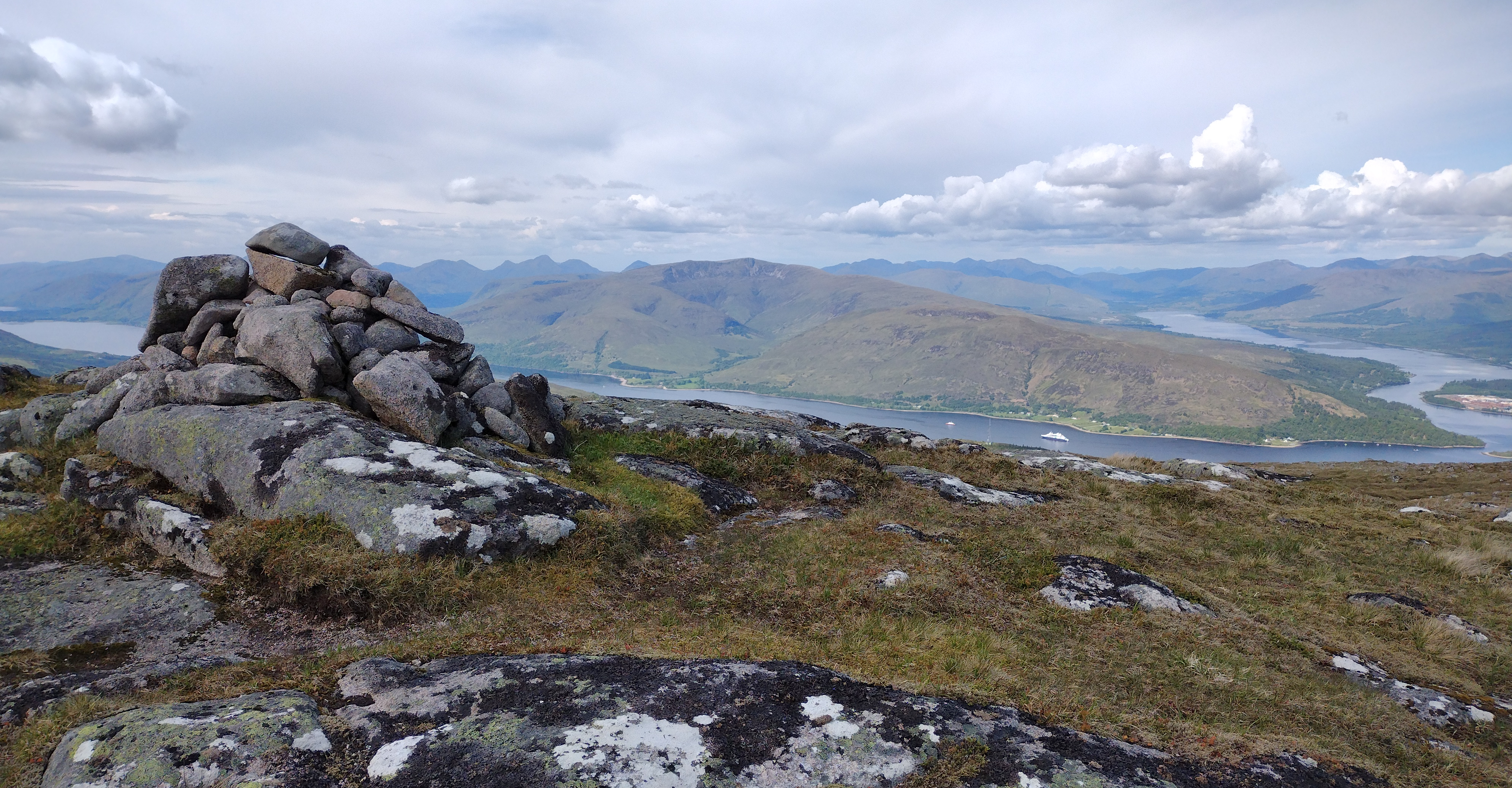
Westward panorama with Loch Linnhe and Loch Eil

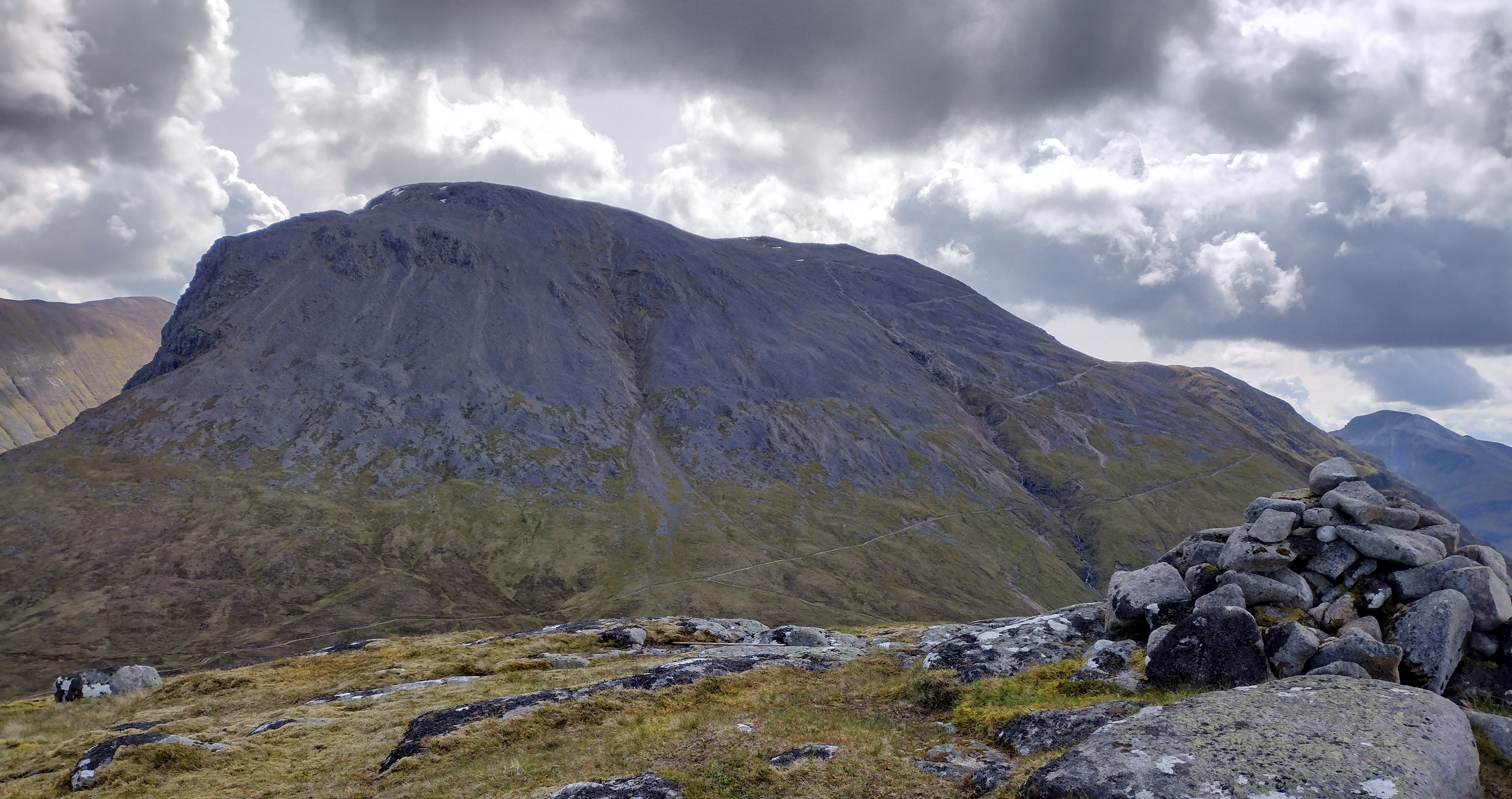
Eastward panorama with the Ben Nevis

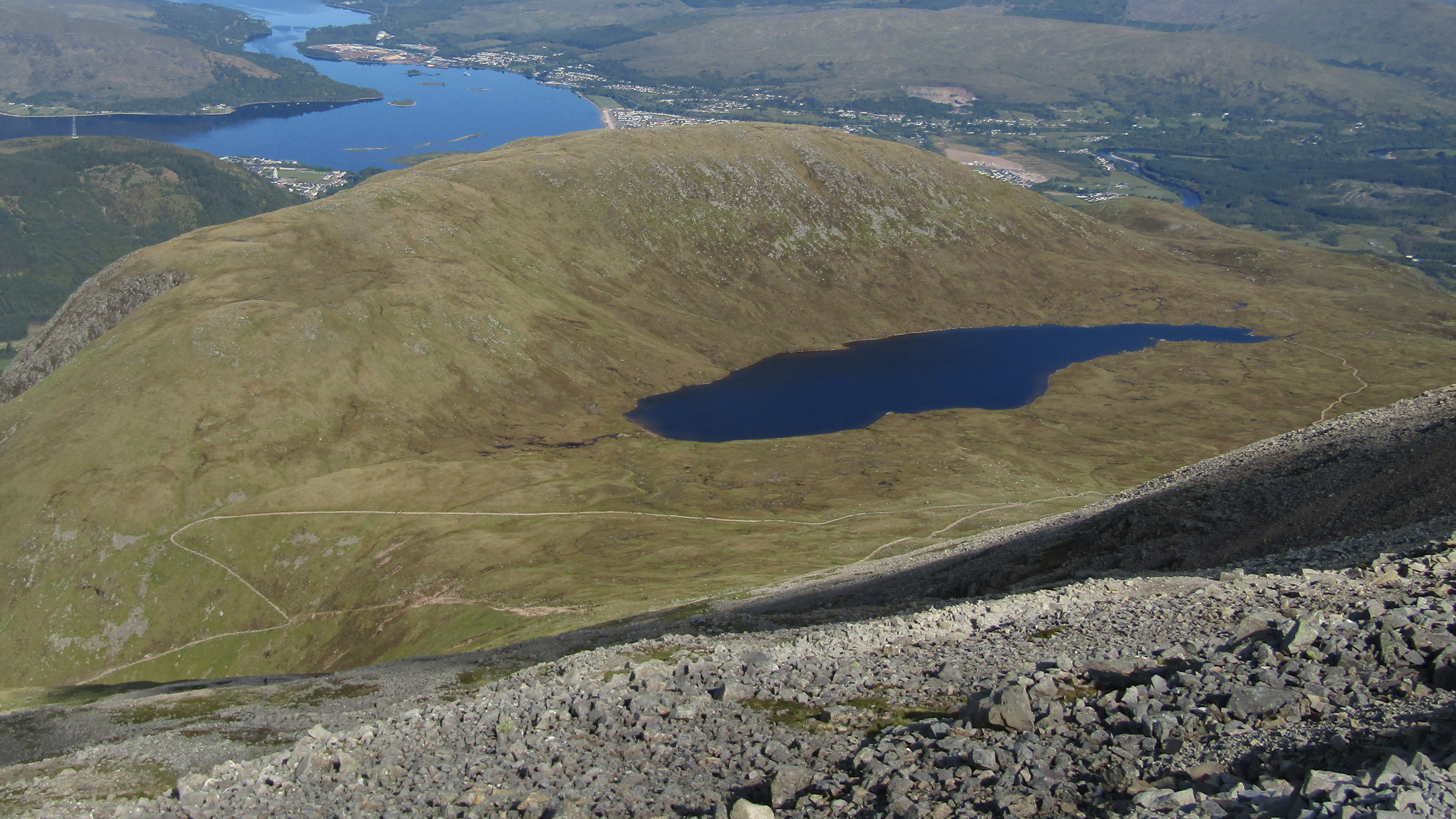
Meall an t-Suidhe, mountain and lake, as seen from the Ben Nevis footpath
