= Tower Ridge =

Mountain ridge in Scotland

Coordinates: 56°48′0″N 5°0′13″W

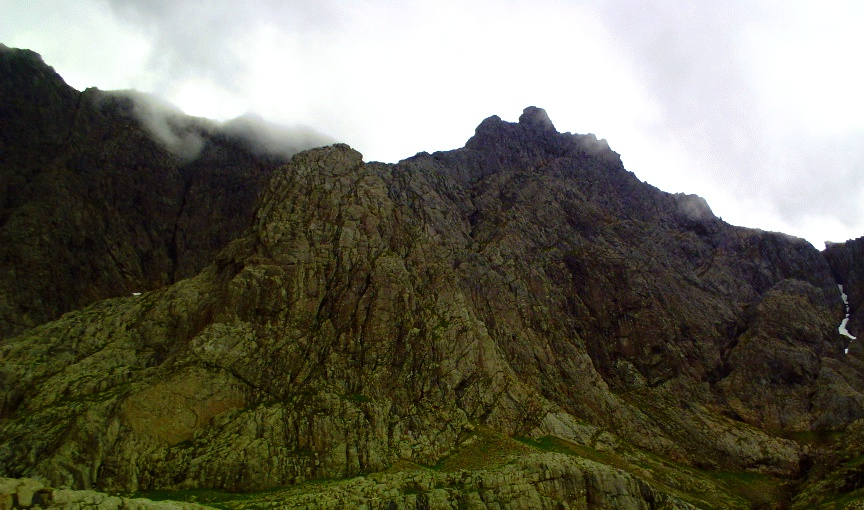
Tower Ridge (Ben Nevis, Highland Scotland) showing the Little and Great towers high on the crest. The inverted N of chimneys on the West Face of Douglas Boulder can be climbed at grades ranging from Difficult to Severe.

Tower Ridge is one of several ridges protruding north east from the summit plateau of Ben Nevis, the highest mountain in the United Kingdom.

== Technical description ==
The ridge starts close to the Charles Inglis Clark hut below Coire Leis and terminates close to the highest point of the mountain. The normal route up Tower Ridge is a graded 3S as a scramble (the highest scrambling grade), and contains short pitches of rock climbing graded as difficult. It is one of the few mountain routes in Scotland with sufficient length and exposure to be considered Alpine in character.

In winter it is graded Scottish Grade IV, partly because most of its difficulties (in particular the Eastern Traverse and the Tower Gap), lie high up on the route.

A number of distinct features can be identified on the ridge. In ascending order, these are (page references are to the SMC's 2002 Climbers' Guide, edited by Simon Richardson):

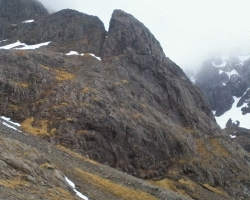
Most parties bypass the Douglas Boulder (centre) to join Tower Ridge from East Gully (left) up to the Douglas Gap; it is easier still to scramble onto the ridge by a right-rising traverse from the left end of the large, high snowpatch.

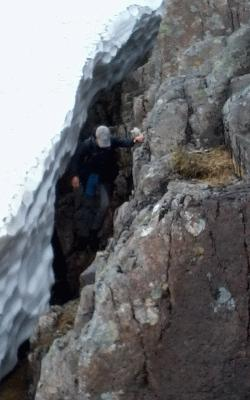
Even as late as June, snow can block access to the foot of East Gully on the Douglas Boulder, in which case the eastern flank of the boulder can be scrambled.

1. The Douglas Boulder, a 200m high semi-cone separated from the ridge proper by gullies on the east and west sides meeting at the Douglas Gap. If climbed from the lowest point by Direct Route (Very Difficult) this offers the most challenging climbing on the ridge. Many parties avoid it (p105), usually by scrambling up East gully (Easy). South-West Ridge (Moderate) to the immediate left of West Gully (Easy) is the easiest face route up the boulder (p112), and a short descent of the same ridge and thence into West Gully is the easiest route down into the Douglas Gap from the top (p107).
2. The Douglas Gap, where parties avoiding the Douglas Boulder via East Gully join the direct line. Tower Ridge proper is then gained via the 20m "tricky chimney" (p106), which became the crux of the route following rockfalls at Tower Gap on and after 30 July 2011. It is well-polished and the exit is delicate in damp conditions.
3. A short, almost level section after Douglas Gap, which steepens to a short wall sometimes mistaken for the Little Tower. The wall can be climbed or bypassed by following an obvious ledge leading up to the right (p105) and climbing back up to the crest. Either route is easy to follow thanks to the abundance of crampon-scratches that mark out the lines of least resistance through these and indeed all awkward sections of the ridge.
4. Another easy-angled section with several undulations and some exposure where it passes over the Great Chimney (Severe, p104) on the east flank (diagram p101).
5. The Little Tower, which heralds a sustained steepening of the ridge but is itself "little more than a step" 50m beyond the Great Chimney (p105).
6. The Great Tower, a much more imposing steepening of the ridge reached after a short level section and a few easy ledges. The two direct ascents (Pigott's and Bell's routes) up the front of the Great Tower are both graded Very Difficult so these are typically avoided by taking the Eastern Traverse, a high ledge traversing to the left and through a flake tunnel before climbing "tricky short walls" (p106) directly up the side of the tower to a small cairn at the top.
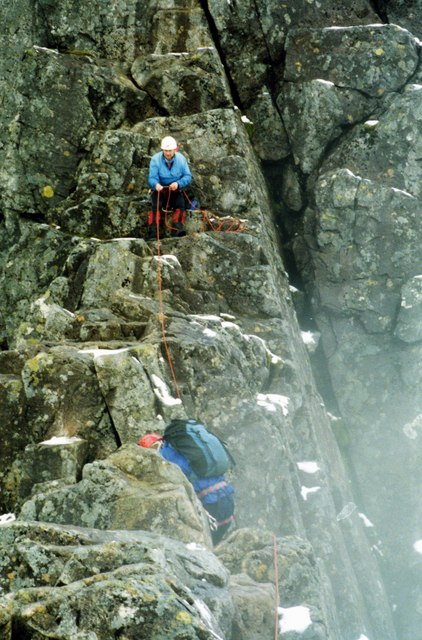
  Crossing Tower Gap above Glover's Chimney: this horizontal problem is difficult to protect.
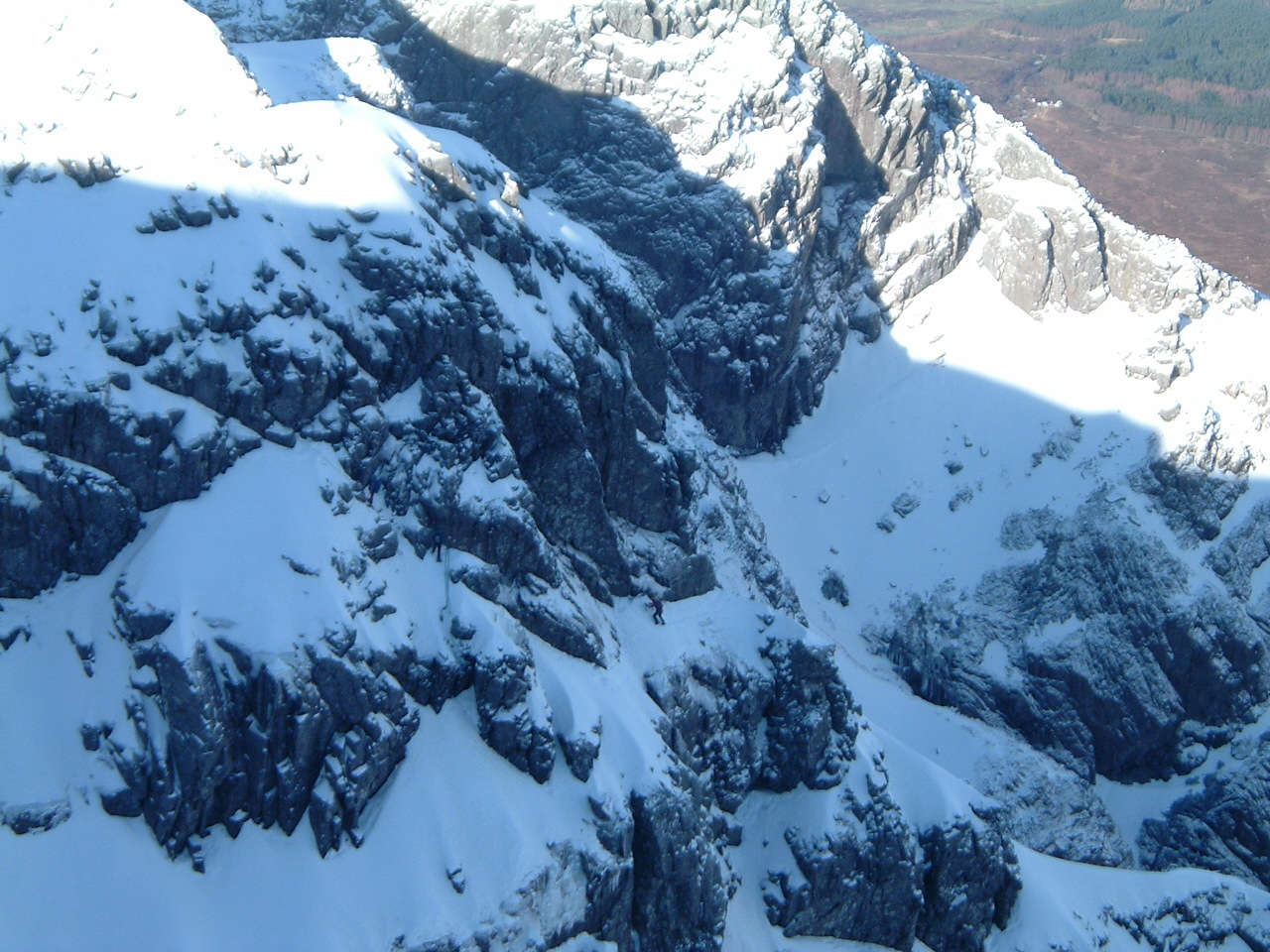
  Climbers on the Easter Traverse below the Great Tower in full winter conditions
7. Tower Gap, a small nick in the ridge beyond the Great Tower, and the old crux of the route. The gap is no more than three metres deep but the ridge approach narrows at this point to about one metre wide, with steep drops to either side. Although the "quite tricky" descent into the gap can be done directly the easiest line is on the left side of the final block; the climb out is "straightforward" (p105). The upper tower and descent into the gap can be bypassed altogether by extending the Eastern Traverse slightly downwards and then further round instead of entering the flake tunnel, regaining the ridge at or beyond the gap or escaping into the neighbouring Tower Gully (Easy, p100).
8. A final easy scramble from above Tower Gap to the summit plateau.

== History ==
Tower Ridge was first climbed in descent by John Hopkinson with his son Bertram and brothers Edward and Charles on 3 September 1892. They had ascended it as far as the Great Tower the previous day (without Charles). The first ascent and first winter ascent was Norman Collie, Godfrey Solly and J.Collier on 29 March 1894. They turned the Great Tower on the right by the Western Traverse, which is harder than the Eastern Traverse; the route normally used today.
