= Beinn Teallach =

Mountain in Highland, Scotland

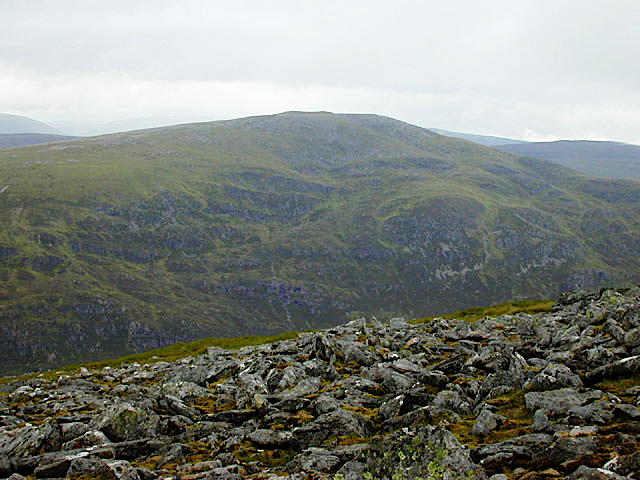
- Beinn Teallach from the nearby Munro of Beinn a' Chaorainn

Highest point
- Elevation: 914.6 m (3,001 ft)
- Prominence: 301 m (988 ft)
- Listing: Munro, Marilyn
- Coordinates: 56°56′07″N 4°41′47″W

Geography
- Location: Lochaber, Scotland
- Parent range: Grampian Mountains
- OS grid: NN361859
- Topo map: OS Landranger 33, 41

Beinn Teallach (914.6 m) is a mountain in the Grampian Mountains of Scotland, located east of the village of Roybridge in Lochaber.

A mostly rounded peak, it has a steep eastern face. Beinn Teallach was previously thought to be a Corbett but was later found to reach Munro status by 20 cm, making it the lowest Munro in Scotland. Climbs usually start from Glen Spean.

The Corrieyairack Pluton forms the summit region of Beinn Teallach. The pluton is dominated by granodiorite and was emplaced into metasedimentary rocks of the Grampian Group, during the Palaeozoic.
