= Beinn a' Chaorainn (Glen Spean) =

Scottish mountain in the Lochaber region of the Highland Council area

Coordinates: 56.9277°N 4.6535°W

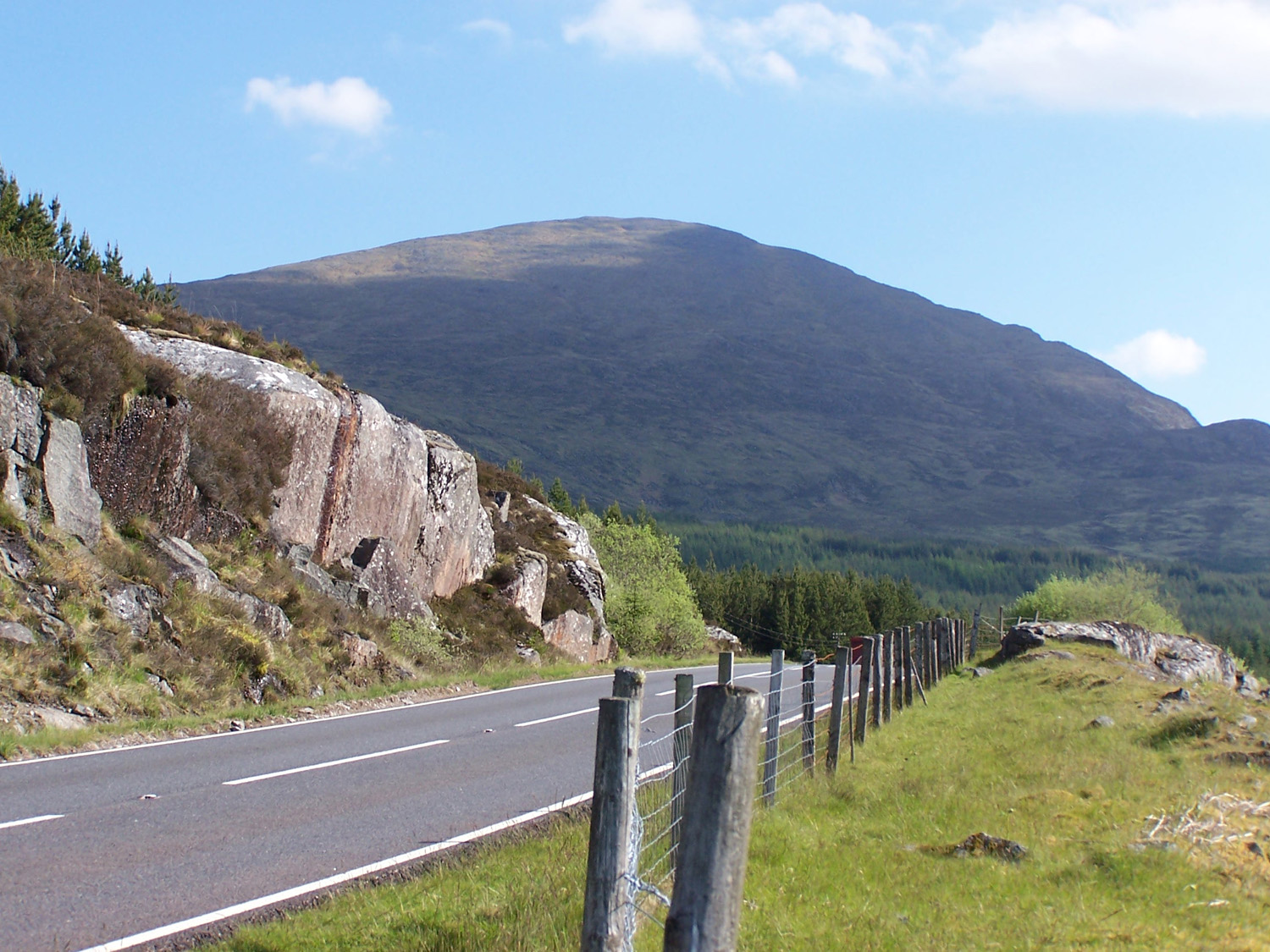
- The southern flank of the mountain seen from Roughburn on the A86.

Highest point
- Elevation: 1,049.1 m (3,442 ft)
- Prominence: 228 m (748 ft)
- Parent peak: Creag Meagaidh
- Listing: Munro, Marilyn

Naming
- English translation: Mountain of the Rowan Tree
- Language of name: Gaelic
- Pronunciation: Scottish Gaelic: [ˈpeiɲ ə ˈxɯːɾɛɲ]

Geography
- Location within Scotland
- Location: Lochaber, Highland, Scotland
- Parent range: Grampians
- OS grid: NN386850
- Topo map: OS Landranger 34, OS Explorer 401

Listed summits of Beinn a' Chaorainn (Glen Spean)
Name	Grid ref	Height	Status
Beinn a' Chaorainn South Top	NN386845	1,049 m (3,442 ft)	Munro Top
Beinn a' Chaorainn North Top	NN383857	1,044 m (3,425 ft)	Munro Top

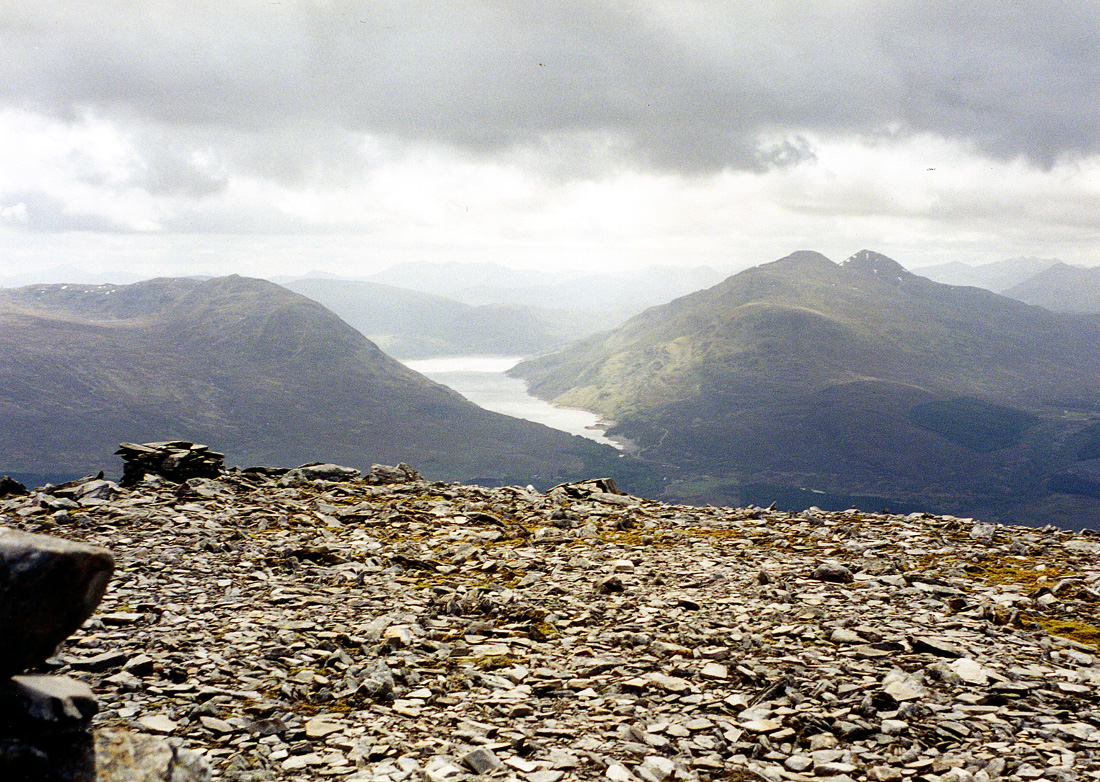
The view south from the summit towards Loch Treig

Beinn a' Chaorainn is a Scottish mountain situated on the northern side of Glen Spean in the Lochaber region of the Highland Council area. The mountain which is located 30 km east-northeast of Fort William is one of several of the same name in the Scottish Highlands and should not be confused with another well known Beinn a' Chaorainn in the Cairngorms.

== Overview ==
Beinn a’ Chaorainn reaches a height of 1052 metres (3451 feet) and qualifies as both a Munro and a Marilyn. It stands in a section of the Grampian Mountains often known as the Loch Laggan Hills these include the Creag Meagaidh range five km to the NE and the adjoining Munro of Beinn Teallach which is just over two km to the west. Beinn a’ Chaorainn is usually climbed in conjunction with Beinn Teallach in a 13 km horseshoe walk around the Allt a’ Chaorainn, starting at Roughburn on the A86 road. The mountains name translates from the Gaelic language as “Mountain of the Rowan Tree”.

== Geography ==
Beinn a’ Chaorainn is basically a north-south orientated ridge which looks quite an undistinguished bulk when viewed from Roughburn (see picture), the best view of the mountain being from the east where the crags of Coire na h-Uamha give the mountain some character. This corrie’s name translates as the Corrie of the Cave although no significant cave is known in its environs although there are several small lochans within its higher recesses. It is drained by the Allt na h-Uamha whose glen separates the mountain from Creag Meagaidh massif to the east. Part of these eastern flanks of the mountain are clothed in coniferous woodland below the 550 metre contour. Coire na h-Uamha is split into two distinctive parts by an eastern ridge which gives a feasible route of ascent from the foot of the coire directly to the main summit, however some care is needed and in Winter conditions it is ranked as a Grade I route.

Coire Buidhe (Yellow Coire) stands at the northern end of the mountain, this corrie is drained by the Burn of Algie, part of the headwaters of the River Roy. Two routes down the ridges on either side of this corrie connects to the adjoining Munros. One route goes NW and links to Beinn Teallach at a col with a height of 614 metres. The other route goes NE down to the Bealach a' Bharnish (824 metres) before ascending onto the Creag Meagaidh plateau. The southern flank of the mountain descends to Glen Spean with more coniferous plantations below 400 metres while the western flanks are very steep as they fall to the glen of the Allt a’ Chaorainn. All drainage from the mountain finds its way to the west coast of Scotland via the River Spean, going either south directly to Glen Spean or north and going via Glen Roy before joining the Spean at Roybridge.

=== Summit ridge ===
Beinn a’ Chaorainn’s summit ridge is approximately 1.5 km in length and made up of three high points. The middle of the three tops is now regarded as the highest point, the South Top (1049 metres) was regarded as the highest point until 1974 when re-surveying downgraded it to a “Top” in the Munros Tables and elevated the middle of the pinnacles to the recognised summit. The North Top (1044 metres) is also a “Top” in the tables and has been so ever since they were first published in 1891. The summit ridge of Beinn a’ Chaorainn has the reputation as a potentially dangerous place for walkers under winter conditions with at least one fatality in 1994. The problem arises with certain sections of the eastern corrie which bite far back into the ridge and can be snow covered in winter forming cornices. Walkers taking direct compass bearings between the high points on the summit ridge have fallen through the cornices by underestimating the distance that the corrie bites into the ridge.

== Ascents ==
The most popular route of ascent starts at Roughburn on the A86 at grid reference NN377813, there is parking at the Loch Laggan Dam, 700 metres to the SW. Forest roads and fire breaks take the walker through the forest to emerge onto the open hillside at a height of 400 metres. The route then goes NE up a broad ridge on the west side of the shallow Coire Clachaig. The view from the summit gives an excellent perspective of the Munros around Loch Treig.
