= Mullach Clach a' Bhlàir =

Mountain in Scotland

- Meall Tional
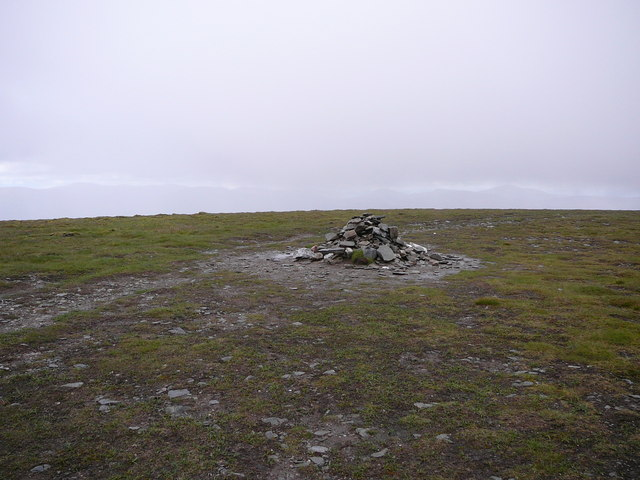

Highest point
- Elevation: 1,019 m (3,343 ft)
- Prominence: c. 89 m
- Parent peak: Sgòr Gaoith
- Listing: Munro
- Coordinates: 57°00′43″N 3°50′29″W

Naming
- English translation: summit of the stony plain
- Language of name: Gaelic

Geography
- Location: Moray / Aberdeenshire
- Parent range: Cairngorms
- OS grid: NN883927
- Topo map: OS Landranger 43

Mullach Clach a' Bhlàir or Meall Tional is a Munro in the Cairngorm mountain range of Scotland.
