= Beinn Bhrotain =

Scottish mountain in the Cairngorms

Coordinates: 57°00′38″N 3°42′33″W

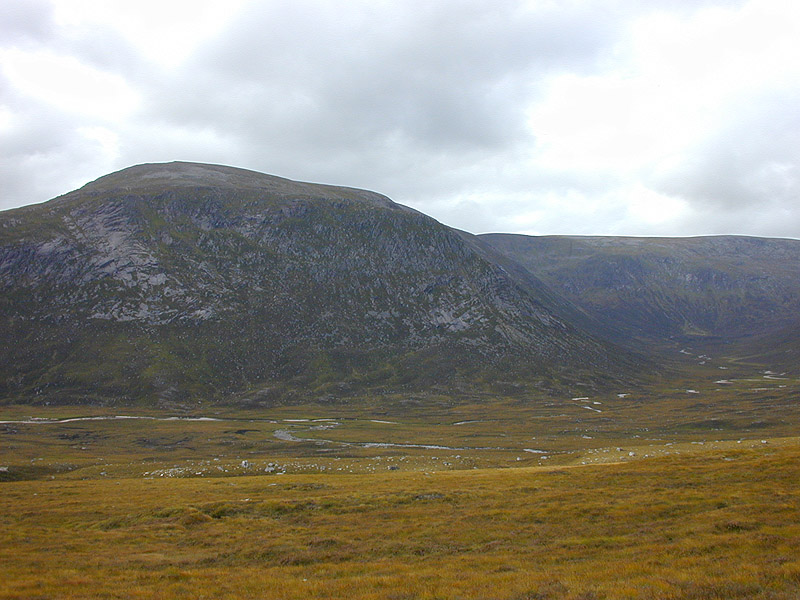
- View across Glen Dee to Beinn Bhrotain, September 2000

Highest point
- Elevation: 1,157 m (3,796 ft)
- Prominence: 258 m (846 ft)
- Listing: Munro, Marilyn

Naming
- English translation: Hill of the mastiff
- Language of name: Gaelic

Geography
- Location within Scotland
- Location: Aberdeenshire, Scotland
- OS grid: NN954923
- Topo map(s): OS Landranger 43 and 36

Climbing
- Easiest route: Hike

Beinn Bhrotain (Scottish Gaelic: Hill of the mastiff) or Ben Vrottan is a Scottish mountain in the Cairngorms range, 18 kilometres west of Braemar in the county of Aberdeenshire.

== See also ==
- Ben Nevis
- List of Munro mountains
- Mountains and hills of Scotland
