= River Nevis =

River Nevis Abhainn Nibheis
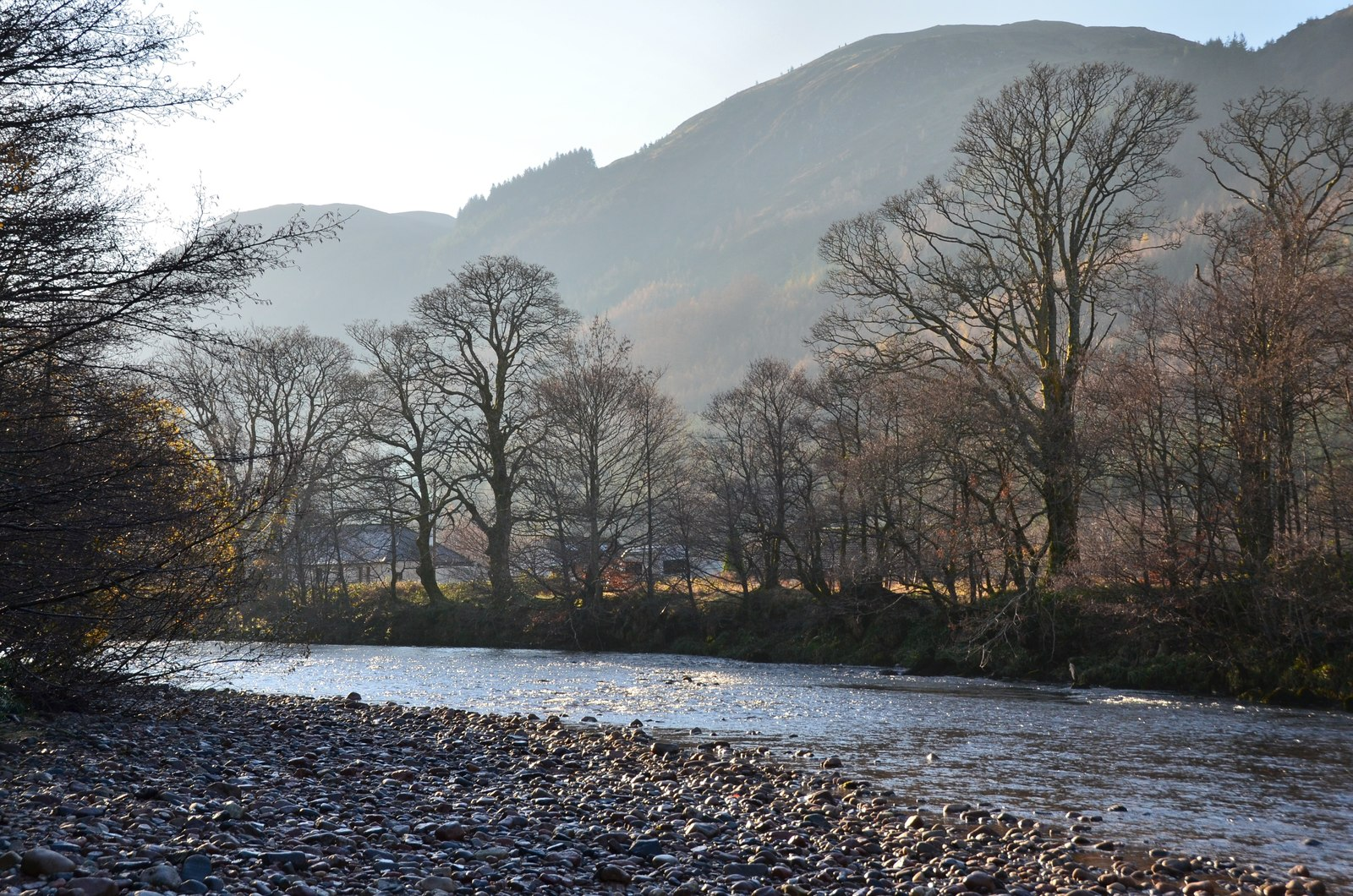
- Native name: Scottish Gaelic: Abhainn Nibheis

Location
- Country: Scotland

Physical characteristics
- Source
  - location: Tom an Eite
  - coordinates: 56.782°N 4.887°W
  - elevation: 370 m (1,210 ft)
- Mouth
  - location: Loch Linnhe
  - coordinates: 56.825°N 5.101°W
  - elevation: 0 m (0 ft)

The River Nevis (Scottish Gaelic: Abhainn Nibheis) flows from the mountains east of Ben Nevis to its mouth near the town of Fort William in Scotland.

== Overview ==
The river rises in the Mamores mountain range approximately halfway between Ben Nevis and Loch Treig, 370m above sea level. In its upper reaches it is known as Water of Nevis, becoming River Nevis at the bridge near Achriabhach. It is partly fed by the Steall Waterfall, one of the highest waterfalls in Scotland. The river flows through Glen Nevis and on to the town of Fort William where it is crossed by the Nevis Bridge on the A82 road. Its mouth is at the sea loch of Loch Linnhe where it meets the sea within the estuary of the River Lochy.

The river shares its name with an amateur football team playing in the Glasgow Colleges Football Association.

== History ==
During the Battle of Inverlochy (1645) many of Argyll's men were drowned as they tried to cross the river while fleeing from the Royalist forces. The river and Loch Linnhe were important natural defences considered in the construction of Fort William in the late 17th century.

== Leisure ==
The river has a salmon population which was threatened in the 1990s but has improved since. The river and its glen are tourist destinations for fishing, walking, cycling, canoeing and climbing, and are regarded as among the most scenic destinations in the country. A two-mile (three-kilometre) race down the River Nevis has been run in the summer since 1973. Competitors use floating aids such as LiLos to navigate the river. The race can take from 20 minutes to 2 hours dependent upon water flow. After a hiatus of several years, the race was run again from 2008 to the present.

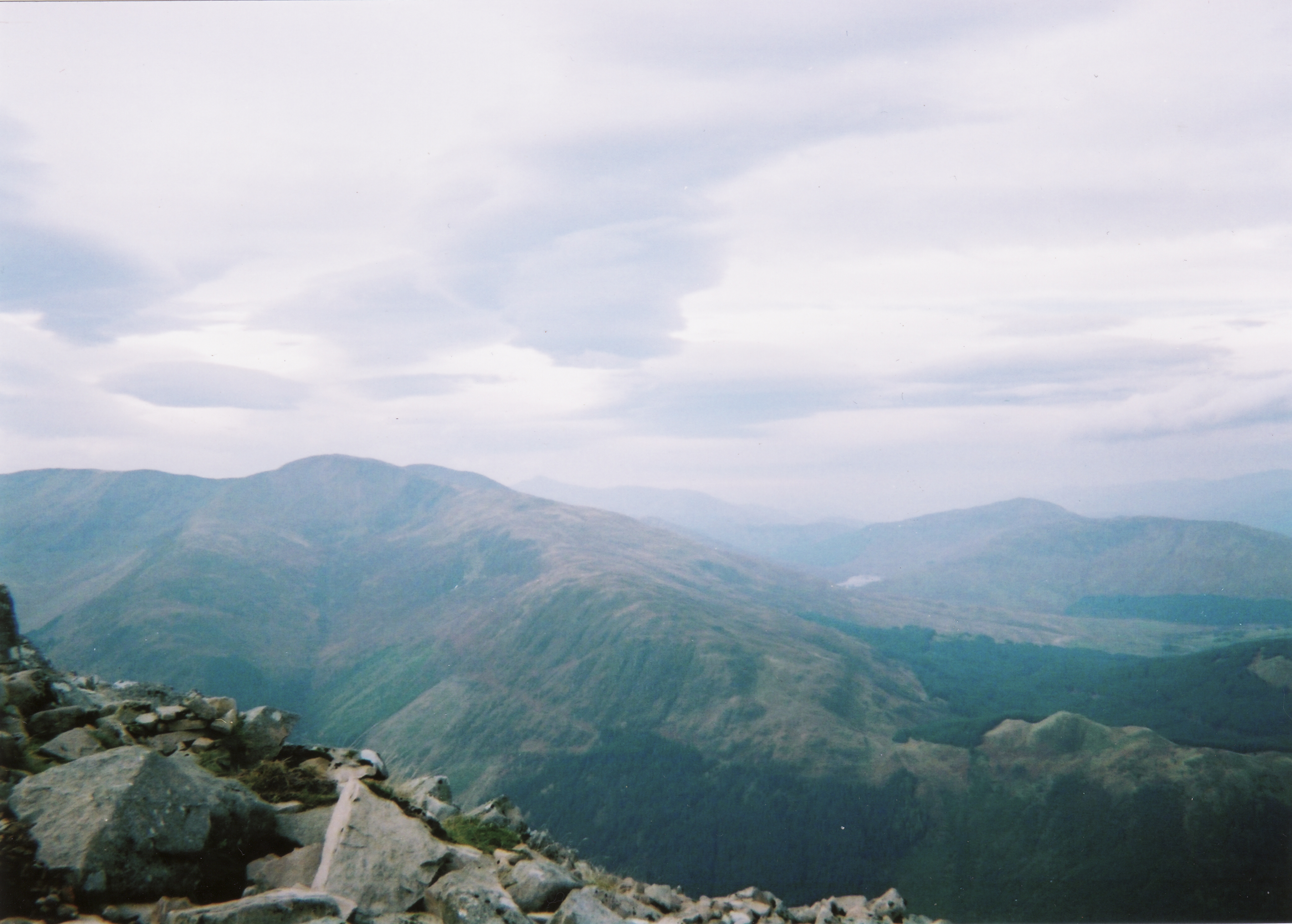
View of Glen Nevis from Ben Nevis

Several guidebooks document walking trails along the river, including the northern end of the West Highland Way. Upstream the river's depth varies widely dependent upon seasonal rainfall and snowmelt, and at Steall Meadows the river can be waded on foot at certain times; a three-wire simple suspension bridge is provided for when the flow does not permit this.

For canoeists the upper reaches of the river at Scimitar Gorge, when swollen by heavy rainfall, are designated a Grade 5 stretch, demanding a very high level of concentration and skill and described by the Scottish Canoe Association as a "maelstrom of water".

== See also ==
- List of rivers of Scotland
