= Càrn Dearg (Corrour) =

Mountain in Scotland

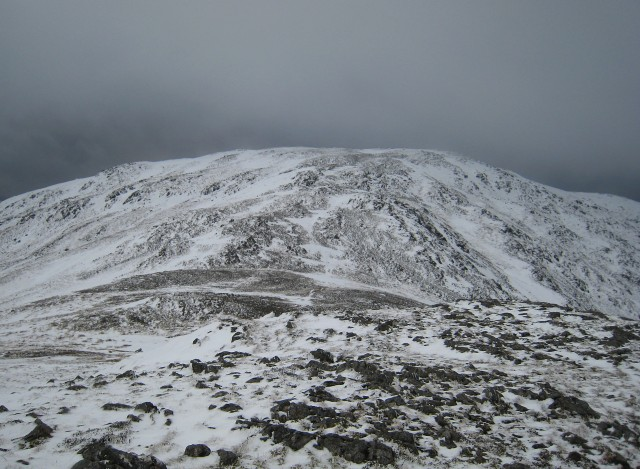
- Carn Dearg summit

Highest point
- Elevation: 941 m (3,087 ft)
- Prominence: 218 m (715 ft)
- Listing: Munro, Marilyn
- Coordinates: 56°45′35″N 4°35′23″W

Geography
- Location: Highland / Perth and Kinross, Scotland
- Parent range: Grampian Mountains
- OS grid: NN417661
- Topo map: OS Landranger 42

Càrn Dearg (941 m) is a remote mountain in Corrour Forest in the Grampian Mountains of Scotland. It lies northeast of Rannoch Moor, overlooking Loch Ossian, on the border of Highland and Perthshire.

The peak is usually reached via either Corrour station or Rannoch station as it is located miles away from any road or settlement.
