= Carn a' Chlamain =

Mountain in Perth and Kinross, Scotland

Coordinates: 56.86092°N 3.77948°W

Càrn a' Chlamain
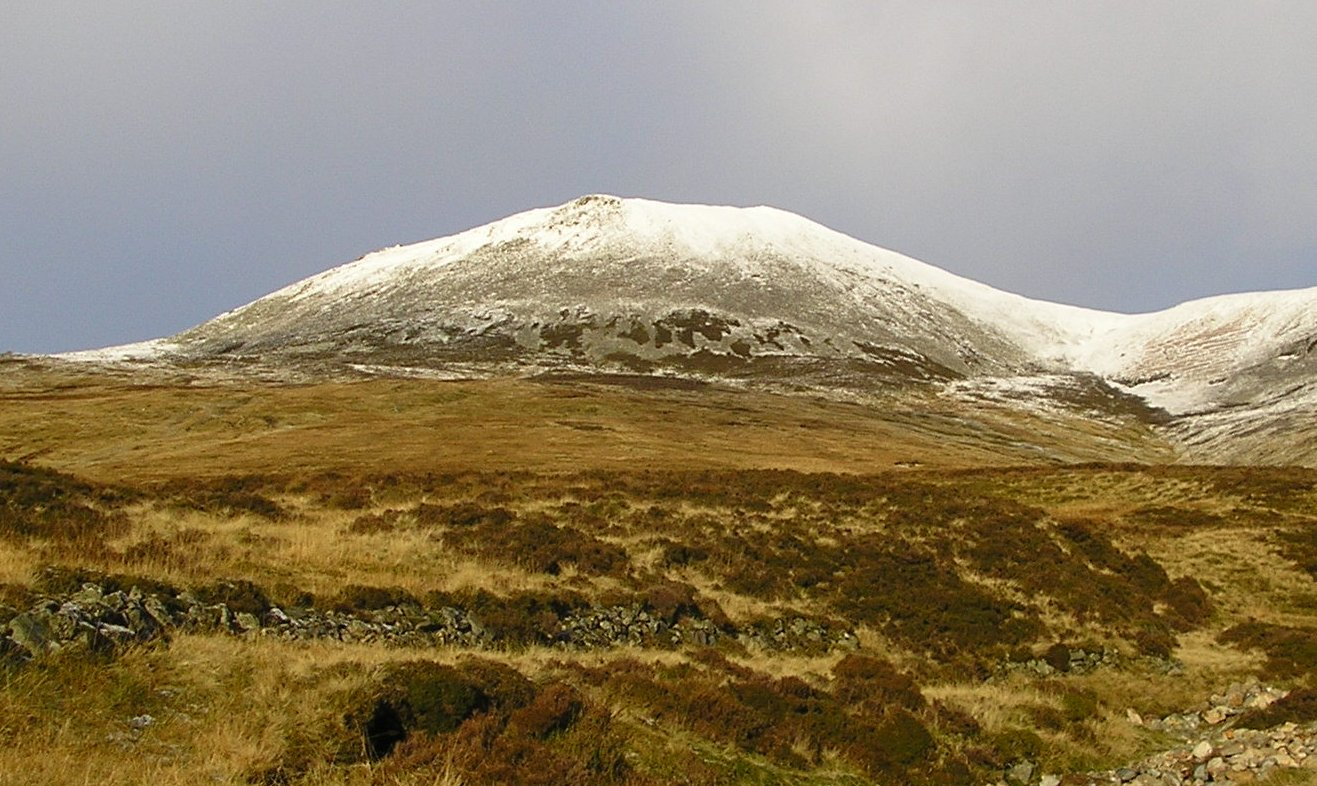
- Càrn a' Chlamain seen from Glen Craoinidh to the south

Highest point
- Elevation: 963 m (3,159 ft)
- Prominence: c. 330 m (1,080 ft)
- Listing: Munro, Marilyn

Naming
- English translation: Hill of the kite or buzzard
- Language of name: Gaelic
- Pronunciation: Scottish Gaelic: [ˈkʰaːrˠn̪ˠ ə ˈxl̪ˠamɛɲ]

Geography
- Location: Perth and Kinross, Scotland
- Parent range: Grampians
- OS grid: NN916758
- Topo map: OS Landranger 43

Càrn a' Chlamain (Gaelic: Càrn a' Chlamhain) is a Scottish mountain situated roughly 12 kilometres north of Blair Atholl in the Forest of Atholl. It is the highest point of an undulating plateau lying northeast of Glen Tilt. The River Tarf, a tributary of the Tilt, rises on the northwestern slopes before curving round the northern side of the plateau, whilst a further Tilt tributary marks the plateau's western boundary.

The summit of Càrn a' Chlamain is a prominent boulder covered dome rising up from the surrounding moorland.

The hill is almost invariably climbed from Glen Tilt. The most common route starts at Forest Lodge in Glen Tilt, from where a stalker's path climbs the steep side of the glen in a succession of zig-zags before crossing the plateau to the summit. As there is no public vehicular access to Forest Lodge the 10 kilometres from Old Blair must be undertaken on foot or bicycle.

One alternative route to the summit follows the southeast ridge; this may be joined about 3 km down the glen from Forest Lodge.
