= Bhan =

Bhan is a Kashmiri Pandit clan and surname native to the Kashmir Valley of Jammu and Kashmir, India. The Bhan Brahmin dynasty founded an erstwhile tribal hill state of Kashmir in the 10th century AD. It was ruled by the Bhan dynasty for two hundred years. Currently, all the territory of this state of Bhan is found in the Sudhanoti District of Azad Kashmir administered by Pakistan. Bhan, as a surname, is also used by Punjabi Saraswat Brahmins.

== Notable people ==
- Ashok Bhan (born 1950), retired IPS officer, Director General of Police (Intelligence) and Director General of Police (Prison)
- Gopinath Bhan (1898–1968), also called Bhagwan Gopinath Ji, mystic saint of Kashmir
- Maharaj Kishan Bhan (1947–2020), Indian Paediatrician and Clinical Scientist
- Mohit Bhan, Indian politician
- Mona Bhan, cultural anthropologist and associate professor of anthropology at DePauw University
- Pushkar Bhan (1926–2008), Indian radio actor and script writer from Kashmir
- Shereen Bhan (born 1976), Indian journalist and news anchor

== See also ==
In Scottish Gaelic, the word for white is bàn (also bhàn, bhàin), as in:

- An Eala Bhàn ("The White Swan"), a Scottish Gaelic love song composed by Dòmhnall Ruadh Chorùna during the Battle of the Somme
- Battle of Coille Bhan (Battle of the White Wood) was fought in 1721 near Attadale, in the county of Ross in the Scottish Highlands
- Beinn Bhàn (disambiguation), meaning White Mountain in Gaelic, is a common name, applied to several hills in different parts of Scotland
- Beinn Bhan (Applecross), a mountain in the highlands of Scotland, lying on the Applecross peninsula, on the north side of Loch Kishorn
- Beinn Bhan (Arkaig), a Scottish mountain situated in the Lochaber region of the Highland Council Area
- Binn Bhan, a mountain in County Galway, Ireland, the highest of the Twelve Bens, and the highest peak in Galway
- Leine bhan, ("White Shirt"), a distinctive smock which trangressors of ecclesiastical law in Scotland were at one time obliged to wear

Other names including the word Bhan:

- Takali Bhan, small village in Shrirampur taluka, Ahmednagar district, Maharashtra, India
- Bhan Syedabad, a small town near Dadu, Dadu District, Sindh, Pakistan
