= Carn na Criche =

Mountain in Scotland

- Càrn na Crìche
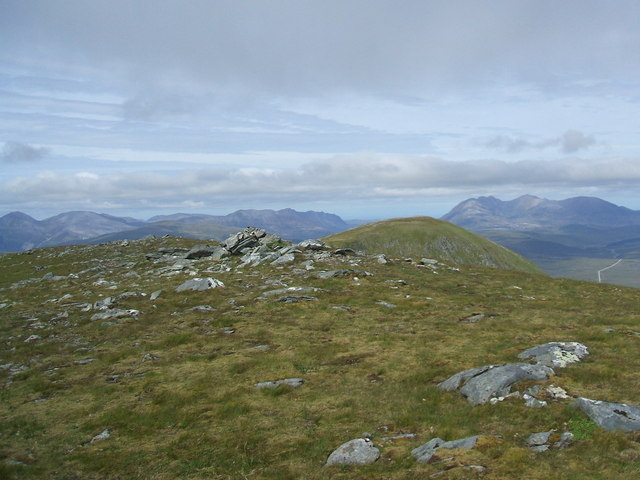

Highest point
- Elevation: 961 m (3,153 ft)
- Prominence: 69 m (226 ft)
- Parent peak: Sgùrr Mòr
- Listing: Munro Top
- Coordinates: 57.706292°N 5.029081°W

Naming
- English translation: Cairn of the boundary
- Language of name: Scottish Gaelic

Geography
- Location within Scotland
- Location: Highland, Scotland
- Parent range: Fannichs
- OS grid: NH 19622 72522
- Topo map: OS Explorer 436

Carn na Criche is a mountain located in the Fannichs in the Scottish Highlands, between Meall a' Chrasgaidh and Sgùrr Mòr. Loch a' Mhadaidh is on the northern slopes.
