= A' Chailleach =

A' Chailleach may refer to the following mountains in Scotland:

- A' Chailleach (Fannichs)
- A' Chailleach (Monadhliath Mountains)
