= List of P600 mountains in the British Isles =

Peaks with prominence over 600m

P600s (the "Majors")
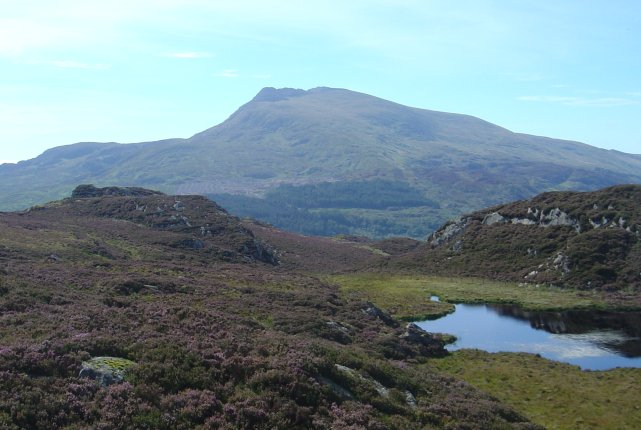
- Moel Siabod in Snowdonia, North Wales, the newest addition to the list of P600s.

Highest point
- Elevation: no requirement; but by definition, elevation is over 600 m (1,969 ft)
- Prominence: over 600 m (1,969 ft)

Geography
- Location: 119 British Isles: 82 Scotland; 25 Ireland (of which 1 in Northern Ireland); 7 Wales; 4 England; 1 Isle of Man

This is a list of P600 mountains in Britain and Ireland by height. A P600 is defined as a mountain with a topographic prominence above 600 m (1,969 ft), regardless of elevation or any other merits (e.g. topographic isolation); this is a similar approach to that of the Marilyn, Simms, HuMP and TuMP British Isle mountain and hill classifications. By definition, P600s have a height above 600 m (1,969 ft), the requirement to be called a "mountain" in the British Isles. The "P" terminology is an international classification, along with P1500 Ultras. P600 and "Majors" are used interchangeably.

As of December 2025, there were 119 P600s in the British Isles: 82 in Scotland, 25 on Ireland (of which 1 in Northern Ireland), 7 in Wales, 4 in England, 1 in Northern Ireland, and 1 in the Isle of Man. The 119 P600s contained 54 of the 282 Scottish Munros, and 10 of the 34 Non-Scottish Munros (or Furths), all of which have heights above 3,000 feet (914.4 m), and are sometimes called the "Super-Majors". The list also contained the highest mountains in Scotland, Wales, Ireland, and England.

On 9 November 2019, Norfolk climber Liam Chase became the first person to complete all 119 P600s in a single calendar year, starting with Cross Fell on 1 January, and ending with Pen y Fan. Chase was also only the fifteenth person recorded to have climbed all P600s over any time period. In 2025, Simon Tull completed the P600s in 93 days, and holds the record for the fastest ascent of all mountains. However, another climber, Tom Cormack, claimed on his Instagram account in July 2023 to have completed the list of 119 peaks in 75 days, 5 hours and 34 minutes. This claim was also reported on local radio.

== P600 mountains by height ==
British Isles mountain cartographer, Alan Dawson, developer of the Marilyns designation, (Note: Marilyns are the same as P600s, except the prominence requirement is just 150 metres (492 ft), therefore all P600s are Marilyns.) labelled "Majors" as having a prominence of over 2,000 ft (610 m), but no other criteria. Dawson's prominence threshold was the normal height threshold for a British Isles mountain, and 111 mountains met his definition. In 2004, Dawson's prominence was converted into a metric threshold of 600 metres (1,969 ft) by Rob Woodall & Jonathan de Ferranti, and labelled the "P600s", a term used by the UIAA for major mountains; the P600s expanded to 119 mountains. Sometimes the list has 120 mountains as there is dispute as to whether Moel Siabod's prominence is above 600 metres (2,000 ft), or is in fact just below the threshold at 599.9 metres.

[TABLE NEEDS UPDATING] This list below was downloaded from the Database of British and Irish Hills ("DoBIH") (Note: The Database of British and Irish Hills ("DoBIH") is the most referenced database for the classification of peaks in the British Isles, and the DoBIH is licensed under a "Creative Commons Attribution 3.0 Unported License".) in October 2018. Note that topographical prominence, unlike topographical elevation, is far more complex to measure and requires a survey of the entire contours of a peak, rather than a single point of height. These tables are therefore subject to being revised over time, and should not be amended or updated unless the entire DoBIH data is re-downloaded again.

Munro: Height over 3,000 feet (914 m), and on the SMC Munro list ("M" § DoBIH codes).
Furth: Height over 3,000 feet (914 m), and on the SMC Furth list ("F" § DoBIH codes).
County: Highest mountain in the county ("CoU" § DoBIH codes).
Country/Regional Top: Highest mountain in England, Wales, Scotland, Ireland, Northern Ireland, or the Isle of Man

British Isles P600 (or "Major") mountains, ranked by height (DoBIH, October 2018 *NOTE: Moel Siabod removed, table needs updating)
Height Rank	Prom. Rank	Name	Country	County	Height (m)	Prom. (m)	Height (ft)	Prom. (ft)	Topo Map	OS Grid Reference	Classification (§ DoBIH codes)
1	1	Ben Nevis; Highest in Scotland	Scotland	Highland (Inverness-shire)	1,345	1,345	4,411	4,411	41	NN166712	Ma,M,Sim,CoH,CoU,CoA,SIB
2	9	Ben Macdui	Scotland	Aberdeenshire/Moray	1,309	950	4,295	3,117	36 43	NN988989	Ma,M,Sim,CoH,CoU,CoA
3	11	Ben Lawers	Scotland	Perth and Kinross	1,214	915	3,983	3,002	51	NN635414	Ma,M,Sim,CoH,CoU,CoA
4	2	Càrn Eige	Scotland	Highland	1,183	1,147	3,881	3,763	25	NH123261	Ma,M,Sim,CoH
5	6	Ben More (Crianlarich)	Scotland	Stirling	1,174	986	3,852	3,235	51	NN432244	Ma,M,Sim,CoU,CoA
6	73	Lochnagar	Scotland	Aberdeenshire	1,156	671	3,793	2,201	44	NO243861	Ma,M,Sim
7	24	Sgùrr na Lapaich	Scotland	Highland	1,151	840	3,776	2,756	25	NH161351	Ma,M,Sim
8	22	Bidean nam Bian	Scotland	Highland	1,149	844	3,771	2,769	41	NN143542	Ma,M,Sim,CoH
9	40	Ben Alder	Scotland	Highland	1,148	783	3,766	2,569	42	NN496718	Ma,M,Sim
10	15	Ben Lui	Scotland	Stirling	1,130	875	3,707	2,871	50	NN266262	Ma,M,Sim
11	46	Binnein Mòr	Scotland	Highland	1,130	759	3,707	2,490	41	NN212663	Ma,M,Sim
12	18	Creag Meagaidh	Scotland	Highland	1,128	867	3,701	2,844	34 42	NN418875	Ma,M,Sim
13	14	Ben Cruachan	Scotland	Argyll and Bute	1,127	880	3,698	2,887	50	NN069304	Ma,M,Sim,CoU,CoA
14	80	Beinn a' Ghlò	Scotland	Perth and Kinross	1,122	658	3,681	2,159	43	NN971733	Ma,M,Sim
15	38	A' Chràileag	Scotland	Highland	1,120	786	3,675	2,579	33	NH094147	Ma,M,Sim
16	110	Stob Coire Easain	Scotland	Highland	1,115	611	3,658	2,005	41	NN308730	Ma,M,Sim
17	12	Sgùrr Mòr (Fannichs)	Scotland	Highland	1,108	913	3,635	2,995	20	NH203718	Ma,M,Sim
18	36	Meall a' Bhùiridh	Scotland	Highland	1,108	795	3,635	2,608	41	NN250503	Ma,M,Sim
19	3	Snowdon (Yr Wyddfa); Highest in Wales	Wales	Gwynedd	1,085	1,039	3,560	3,409	115	SH609543	Ma,F,Sim,Hew,N,CoH,CoU,CoA
20	34	Beinn Dearg (Ullapool)	Scotland	Highland	1,084	805	3,556	2,641	20	NH259811	Ma,M,Sim
21	32	Sgùrr a' Choire Ghlais	Scotland	Highland	1,083	818	3,553	2,684	25	NH258430	Ma,M,Sim
22	53	Schiehallion	Scotland	Perth and Kinross	1,083	716	3,553	2,349	42 51 52	NN713547	Ma,M,Sim
23	85	Beinn a' Chreachain	Scotland	Perth and Kinross	1,081	650	3,545	2,133	50	NN373440	Ma,M,Sim
24	76	Sgùrr Fhuaran	Scotland	Highland	1,069	665	3,506	2,182	33	NG978166	Ma,M,Sim
25	49	Carnedd Llewelyn	Wales	Conwy/Gwynedd	1,064	750	3,491	2,461	115	SH683643	Ma,F,Sim,Hew,N,CoU
26	47	An Teallach	Scotland	Highland	1,063	757	3,486	2,484	19	NH068843	Ma,M,Sim
27	8	Liathach	Scotland	Highland	1,055	957	3,461	3,140	25	NG929579	Ma,M,Sim
28	64	Ben Wyvis	Scotland	Highland	1,046	691	3,432	2,267	20	NH462683	Ma,M,Sim
29	89	Chno Dearg	Scotland	Highland	1,046	644	3,432	2,113	41	NN377741	Ma,M,Sim
30	25	Sgùrr na Cìche	Scotland	Highland	1,040	839	3,412	2,753	33 40	NM902966	Ma,M,Sim
31	4	Carrauntoohil; Highest in Ireland	Ireland	Kerry	1,039	1,038.6	3,407	3,407	78	V803844	Ma,F,Sim,Hew,Dil,A,VL,CoH,CoU
32	45	Gleouraich	Scotland	Highland	1,035	765	3,396	2,510	33	NH039053	Ma,M,Sim
33	88	Beinn Fhada	Scotland	Highland	1,032	647	3,386	2,123	33	NH018192	Ma,M,Sim
34	58	Sgùrr a' Mhaoraich	Scotland	Highland	1,027	708	3,369	2,323	33	NG983065	Ma,M,Sim
35	50	Beinn a' Bheithir	Scotland	Highland	1,024	729	3,360	2,392	41	NN056558	Ma,M,Sim
36	37	Ladhar Bheinn	Scotland	Highland	1,020	795	3,346	2,608	33	NG824039	Ma,M,Sim
37	55	Beinn Ìme	Scotland	Argyll and Bute	1,011	712	3,317	2,336	56	NN254084	Ma,M,Sim
38	96	Beinn Eighe	Scotland	Highland	1,010	632	3,314	2,073	19	NG951611	Ma,M,Sim
39	92	Glyder Fawr	Wales	Conwy/Gwynedd	1,001	642	3,284	2,106	115	SH642579	Ma,F,Sim,Hew,N
40	26	Ben More Assynt	Scotland	Highland	998	835	3,274	2,740	15	NC318201	Ma,M,Sim,CoH
41	5	Sgùrr Alasdair	Scotland	Highland	992	992	3,255	3,255	32	NG450207	Ma,M,Sim,SIB
42	23	Gaor Bheinn	Scotland	Highland	987	842	3,238	2,762	41	NN002875	Ma,M,Sim
43‡	118	Beinn Alligin	Scotland	Highland	986	601	3,235	1,972	19 24	NG865612	Ma,M,Sim
44	27	Ben Vorlich	Scotland	Perth and Kinross	985	834	3,232	2,736	57	NN629189	Ma,M,Sim
45	99	Slioch	Scotland	Highland	981	626	3,219	2,054	19	NH004690	Ma,M,Sim
46	13	Scafell Pike; Highest in England	England	Cumbria	978	912	3,209	2,992	89 90	NY215072	Ma,F,Sim,Hew,N,W, B,Sy,Fel, CoH,CoU,CoA
47	30	Ben Lomond	Scotland	Stirling	974	820	3,196	2,690	56	NN367028	Ma,M,Sim,CoH
48	100	Aonach Eagach	Scotland	Highland	968	623	3,175	2,044	41	NN140583	Ma,M,Sim
49	7	Ben More	Scotland	Argyll and Bute	966	966	3,169	3,169	47 48	NM525330	Ma,M,Sim,SIB
50	106	Sgùrr Thuilm	Scotland	Highland	963	614	3,159	2,014	40	NM939879	Ma,M,Sim
51	31	Ben Klibreck	Scotland	Highland	962	819	3,156	2,687	16	NC585299	Ma,M,Sim
52	52	Sgorr Ruadh	Scotland	Highland	961	723	3,152	2,372	25	NG959505	Ma,M,Sim
53	10	Mount Brandon	Ireland	Kerry	952	927	3,122	3,041	70	Q460116	Ma,F,Sim,Hew,Dil,A,VL
54	56	Helvellyn	England	Cumbria	950	712	3,117	2,336	90	NY342151	Ma,F,Sim,Hew,N,W,B,Sy,Fel,CoH
55	95	Ben Vorlich	Scotland	Argyll and Bute	943	632	3,094	2,073	50 56	NN295124	Ma,M,Sim,CoH
56	77	Beinn Sgulaird	Scotland	Argyll and Bute	937	662	3,074	2,172	50	NN053460	Ma,M,Sim
57	102	Sròn a' Choire Ghairbh	Scotland	Highland	937	622	3,074	2,041	34	NN222945	Ma,M,Sim
58	79	Fionn Bheinn	Scotland	Highland	933	658	3,061	2,159	20	NH147621	Ma,M,Sim
59	57	Skiddaw	England	Cumbria	931	709	3,054	2,326	89 90	NY260290	Ma,F,Sim,Hew,N,W,B,Sy,Fel
60	87	Ben Chonzie	Scotland	Perth and Kinross	931	648	3,054	2,126	51 52	NN773308	Ma,M,Sim
61	19	Blà Bheinn	Scotland	Highland	929	862	3,048	2,828	32	NG529217	Ma,M,Sim
62	43	Ben Hope	Scotland	Highland	927	772	3,041	2,533	9	NC477501	Ma,M,Sim
63	21	Lugnaquilla	Ireland	Wicklow	925	849	3,035	2,785	56	T032917	Ma,F,Sim,Hew,Dil,A,VL,CoH,CoU
64	29	Galtymore	Ireland	Limerick/ Tipperary	918	821	3,011	2,694	74	R878237	Ma,F,Sim,Hew,Dil,A,VL,CoH,CoU
65	66	Foinaven	Scotland	Highland	911	688	2,989	2,257	9	NC315506	Ma,C,Sim
66	75	Aran Fawddwy	Wales	Gwynedd	905	670	2,969	2,198	124 125	SH862223	Ma,Sim,Hew,N,CoH
67	93	Beinn an Lochain	Scotland	Argyll and Bute	902	640	2,958	2,100	56	NN218078	Ma,C,Sim,xMT
68	109	Sgùrr nan Eugallt	Scotland	Highland	898	612	2,946	2,008	33	NG927048	Ma,C,Sim
69	20	Beinn Bhan	Scotland	Highland	896	851	2,940	2,792	24	NG803450	Ma,C,Sim
70	84	Cross Fell	England	Cumbria	893	651	2,930	2,136	91	NY687343	Ma,Sim,Hew,N
71‡	113	Cadair Idris	Wales	Gwynedd	893	608	2,929	1,995	124	SH711130	Ma,Sim,Hew,N
72	17	Sgùrr Dhòmhnuill	Scotland	Highland	888	873	2,913	2,864	40	NM889678	Ma,C,Sim
73	72	Pen y Fan	Wales	Powys	886	672	2,907	2,205	160	SO012215	Ma,Sim,Hew,N,CoH,CoU,CoA
74	68	Garbh Bheinn	Scotland	Highland	885	687	2,904	2,254	40	NM904622	Ma,C,Sim
75	42	Rois-bheinn	Scotland	Highland	882	774	2,894	2,539	40	NM756778	Ma,C,Sim
76	16	Goat Fell	Scotland	North Ayrshire	874	874	2,867	2,867	62 69	NR991415	Ma,C,Sim,CoH,CoU,SIB
77‡	115	Ben Hee	Scotland	Highland	873	607	2,864	1,991	16	NC426339	Ma,C,Sim
78‡‡	119	Moel Siabod	Wales	Conwy	872	600	2,862	1,968	115	SH705546	Ma,Sim,Hew,N
79	48	Creach Bheinn	Scotland	Highland	853	755	2,799	2,477	49	NM870576	Ma,C,Sim
80	91	Baurtregaum	Ireland	Kerry	851	642	2,792	2,106	71	Q749076	Ma,Sim,Hew,Dil,A,VL
81	28	Slieve Donard; Highest in N. Ireland	Northern Ireland	Down	850	825	2,789	2,707	29	J358276	Ma,Sim,Hew,Dil,A,VL,CoH,CoU
82	83	Cùl Mòr	Scotland	Highland	849	651	2,785	2,136	15	NC162119	Ma,C,Sim
83	105	Sgùrr Ghiubhsachain	Scotland	Highland	849	614	2,785	2,014	40	NM875751	Ma,C,Sim
84	65	Canisp	Scotland	Highland	847	689	2,779	2,260	15	NC202187	Ma,C,Sim
85	60	Merrick	Scotland	Dumfries and Galloway	843	705	2,766	2,313	77	NX427855	Ma,C,Sim,D,CoH,CoU,CoA
86	82	Broad Law	Scotland	Scottish Borders	840	653	2,756	2,142	72	NT146235	Ma,C,Sim,D,CoH,CoU,CoA
87	107	Càrn Mòr	Scotland	Highland	829	613	2,720	2,011	33 40	NM903909	Ma,C,Sim
88	41	Mweelrea	Ireland	Mayo	814	778	2,671	2,552	37	L789668	Ma,Sim,Hew,Dil,A,VL,CoH,CoU
89	33	Askival	Scotland	Highland	812	812	2,664	2,664	39	NM393952	Ma,C,Sim,SIB
90	101	Waun Fach	Wales	Powys	811	622	2,661	2,041	161	SO215299	Ma,Sim,Hew,N
91	44	Nephin	Ireland	Mayo	806	768	2,644	2,520	23 31	G103079	Ma,Sim,Hew,Dil,A,VL
92	35	Clisham(An Cliseam)	Scotland	Na h-Eileanan Siar	799	799	2,621	2,621	13 14	NB154073	Ma,C,Sim,CoU,CoA,SIB
93	51	Mount Leinster	Ireland	Carlow/ Wexford	794	726	2,606	2,382	68	S826525	Ma,Sim,Hew,Dil,A,VL,CoH,CoU
94	71	Knockmealdown	Ireland	Tipperary/ Waterford	792	678	2,600	2,224	74	S057084	Ma,Sim,Hew,Dil,A,VL,CoH,CoU
95	98	Fauscoum	Ireland	Waterford	792	628	2,598	2,060	75	S316105	Ma,Sim,Hew,Dil,A,VL
96	39	Beinn an Òir	Scotland	Argyll and Bute	785	785	2,575	2,575	60 61	NR498749	Ma,C,Sim,SIB
97	59	Barrclashcame	Ireland	Mayo	772	706	2,533	2,316	37	L849695	Ma,Sim,Hew,Dil,A,VL
98	78	Dùn da Ghaoithe	Scotland	Argyll and Bute	766	659	2,513	2,162	49	NM672362	Ma,C,Sim
99‡	112	Ben Loyal	Scotland	Highland	764	609	2,507	1,998	10	NC578488	Ma,C,Sim
100	94	Croagh Patrick	Ireland	Mayo	764	638	2,507	2,093	30	L905802	Ma,Sim,Hew,Dil,A,VL
101	69	Errigal	Ireland	Donegal	751	685	2,464	2,247	01	B928207	Ma,Sim,Hew,Dil,A,VL,CoH,CoU
102	81	Ben Mor Coigach	Scotland	Highland	743	655	2,438	2,149	15	NC093042	Ma,G,Sim
103	61	Beinn Mhòr	Scotland	Argyll and Bute	741	696	2,431	2,283	56	NS107908	Ma,G,Sim
104	54	Sgùrr na Coinnich	Scotland	Highland	739	714	2,425	2,343	33	NG762222	Ma,G,Sim
105	63	Doune Hill	Scotland	Argyll and Bute	734	695	2,408	2,280	56	NS290970	Ma,G,Sim
106	62	Beinn na Caillich	Scotland	Highland	732	696	2,402	2,283	32	NG601232	Ma,G,Sim
107	70	Benbaun (Binn Bhan)	Ireland	Galway	725	682	2,379	2,238	37	L785539	Ma,Sim,Hew,Dil,A,VL,CoH,CoU
108	86	Slieve Carr	Ireland	Mayo	721	648	2,365	2,126	23	F914144	Ma,Sim,Hew,Dil,A,VL
109	90	Slievenamon	Ireland	Tipperary	721	643	2,365	2,110	67	S297307	Ma,Sim,Hew,Dil,A,VL
110	74	The Storr	Scotland	Highland	719	671	2,359	2,201	23	NG495540	Ma,G,Sim
111	111	Knockboy	Ireland	Cork/ Kerry	706	610	2,316	2,001	85	W004620	Ma,Sim,Hew,Dil,A,VL,CoH,CoU
112	97	Binn idir an dá Log	Ireland	Galway	702	629	2,303	2,064	37	L888528	Ma,Sim,Hew,Dil,A,VL
113	108	Ben Gorm	Ireland	Mayo	700	612	2,297	2,008	37	L861652	Ma,Sim,Hew,Dil,A,VL
114‡	116	Keeper Hill	Ireland	Tipperary	694	607	2,277	1,991	59	R823667	Ma,Sim,Hew,Dil,A,VL
115	67	Croaghaun	Ireland	Mayo	688	688	2,257	2,257	22 30	F559060	Ma,Sim,Hew,Dil,A,VL
116‡	114	Maumtrasna	Ireland	Mayo	682	608	2,238	1,995	38	L961637	Ma,Sim,Hew,Dil,A,VL
117‡	117	Cuilcagh	Ireland	Cavan/ Fermanagh	666	605	2,185	1,985	26	H123280	Ma,Sim,Hew,Dil,A,VL,CoH,CoU
118	103	Snaefell; Highest on the IOM	Isle of Man	Isle of Man	621	621	2,037	2,037	95	SC397880	Ma,Sim,CoH,CoU,CoA
119	104	Beinn Mhòr	Scotland	Na h-Eileanan Siar	620	620	2,034	2,034	22	NF808310	Ma,G,Sim,SIB
120‡	120	Slieve Snaght	Ireland	Donegal	615	600	2,018	1,969	03	C424390	Ma,Sim,Hew,Dil,A,VL

(‡) Would not have been eligible for Dawson's 2004 "imperial" list of 111 mountains with prominence over 2,000 ft (610 m).
(‡‡) Added since the 2006 "metric" list of 119 mountains with prominence over 2,000 ft (610 m), based on updated surveys.

== Sub–Majors by height ==
In 2006, mountain database publisher, Mark Trengove, added a list of seven "Sub–Majors" (to Dawson, Woodall, and de Ferranti's P600 "Majors"), which had a prominence of between 590–600 m (1,940–1,970 ft), and which possibly could become P600s, or Majors, in the future due to any possible discovered "contour uncertainty, rounding error, or map error". In 2006, one of Trengrove's Sub–Majors, Moel Siabod, was re–surveyed and shown to be a P600 "Major", however it was recently re-added to the Sub-after further surveying. The list below is the October 2018 DoBIH list of the six mountains with a prominence between 590–600 m (1,940–1,970 ft) in the British Isles.

Munro: Height over 3,000 feet (914 m), and on the SMC Munro list.
Furth: Height over 3,000 feet (914 m), and on the SMC Furth list.
County Top: Highest mountain in the County ("CoU" § DoBIH codes).

British Isles P600 "Sub-Major" mountains, ranked by height (DoBIH, October 2018 *NOTE: Moel Siabod re-added, table needs updating)
Height Rank	Prom. Rank	Name	Country	County	Height (m)	Prom. (m)	Height (ft)	Prom. (ft)	Topo Map	OS Grid Reference	Classification (§ DoBIH codes)
5	1	Moel Siabod	Wales	Conwy	872	599.9	2,862	1,968	115	SH705546	Ma,Sim,Hew,N
1	6	Mullach Coire Mhic Fhearchair	Scotland	Highland	1,015	591	3,331	1,939	19	NH052735	Ma,M,Sim
2	5	Beinn Bhuidhe	Scotland	Argyll and Bute	949	592	3,112	1,942	50 56	NN203187	Ma,M,Sim
3	7	Càrn Dearg	Scotland	Highland	946	591	3,103	1,939	35	NH635023	Ma,M,Sim
4	3	Mòruisg	Scotland	Highland	928	594	3,045	1,949	25	NH101499	Ma,M,Sim
6	4	Purple Mountain	Ireland	Kerry	832	593	2,730	1,946	78	V886851	Ma,Sim,Hew,Dil,A,VL
7	2	Ben Cleuch	Scotland	Clackmannanshire	721	595	2,365	1,952	58	NN902006	Ma,G,Sim,D,CoH,CoU

== DoBIH codes ==
The DoBIH uses the following codes for the various classifications of mountains and hills in the British Isles, which many of the above peaks also fall into:

- Ma - Marilyn
- Hu - HuMP
- Sim - Simm
- 5 - Dodd
- M - Munro
- MT - Munro Top
- F - Furth
- C - Corbett
- G - Graham
- D - Donald
- DT - Donald Top
- Hew - Hewitt
- N - Nuttall
- Dew - Dewey
- DDew - Donald Dewey
- HF - Highland Five
- 4 - 400−499 m Tump
- 3 - 300−399 m Tump (GB)
- 2 - 200−299 m Tump (GB)
- 1 - 100−199 m Tump (GB)
- 0 - ;0−99 m Tump (GB)
- W - Wainwright
- WO - Wainwright Outlying Fell
- B - Birkett
- Sy - Synge
- Fel - Fellranger
- CoH - County Top: Historic (pre-1974)
- CoA - County Top: Administrative (1974 to mid-1990s)
- CoU - County Top: Current County or Unitary Authority
- CoL - County Top: Current London Borough
- SIB - Significant Island of Britain
- Dil - Dillon
- A - Arderin
- VL - Vandeleur-Lynam
- MDew - Myrddyn Dewey
- O - Other list (which includes):
  - Bin - Binnion
  - Bg - Bridge
  - BL - Buxton & Lewis
  - Ca - Carn
  - CT - Corbett Top
  - GT - Graham Top
  - Mur - Murdo
  - P500 - P500
  - P600 - P600
- Un - unclassified

Prefixes

- s sub
- x deleted

Suffixes

- = twin

== See also ==
- List of mountains of the British Isles by height
- Lists of mountains and hills in the British Isles
- List of mountains in Ireland
- List of Munro mountains in Scotland
- List of Murdos (mountains)
- List of Furth mountains in the British Isles
- List of Marilyns in the British Isles
