= Rois-bheinn =

Mountain in Scotland

Coordinates: 56°50′14″N 5°40′50″W

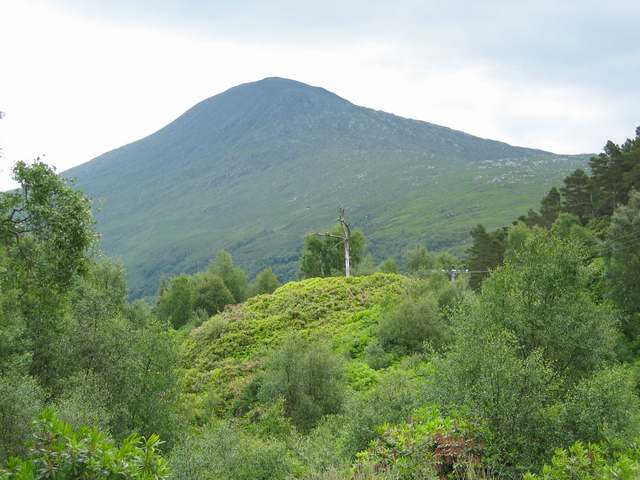

Highest point
- Elevation: 882 m (2,894 ft)
- Prominence: 774 m (2,539 ft)Ranked 42nd in British Isles
- Parent peak: Gaor Bheinn
- Listing: Marilyn, Corbett

Naming
- English translation: unknown
- Language of name: Gaelic
- Pronunciation: Scottish Gaelic: [ˈrˠɔʃveɲ]

Geography
- Location: Moidart, Scotland
- OS grid: NM756778
- Topo map: OS Landranger 40

Rois-bheinn is the joint highest hill in the Scottish region of Moidart, a title it shares with its neighbour Beinn Odhar Bheag, whose summit has the same elevation.

The mountain may be climbed by its west ridge from the small village of Roshven (a settlement that takes its name from a roughly phonetic spelling of Rois-bheinn's name), or from Inverailort to the north.

The Moidart peninsula is separated from the lands to its north by the deep pass of Loch Eilt, making Rois-bheinn one of the more prominent hills in the British Isles.
