= Sgùrr nan Clach Geala =

Mountain in Scotland

Coordinates: 57°41′49″N 5°2′53″W

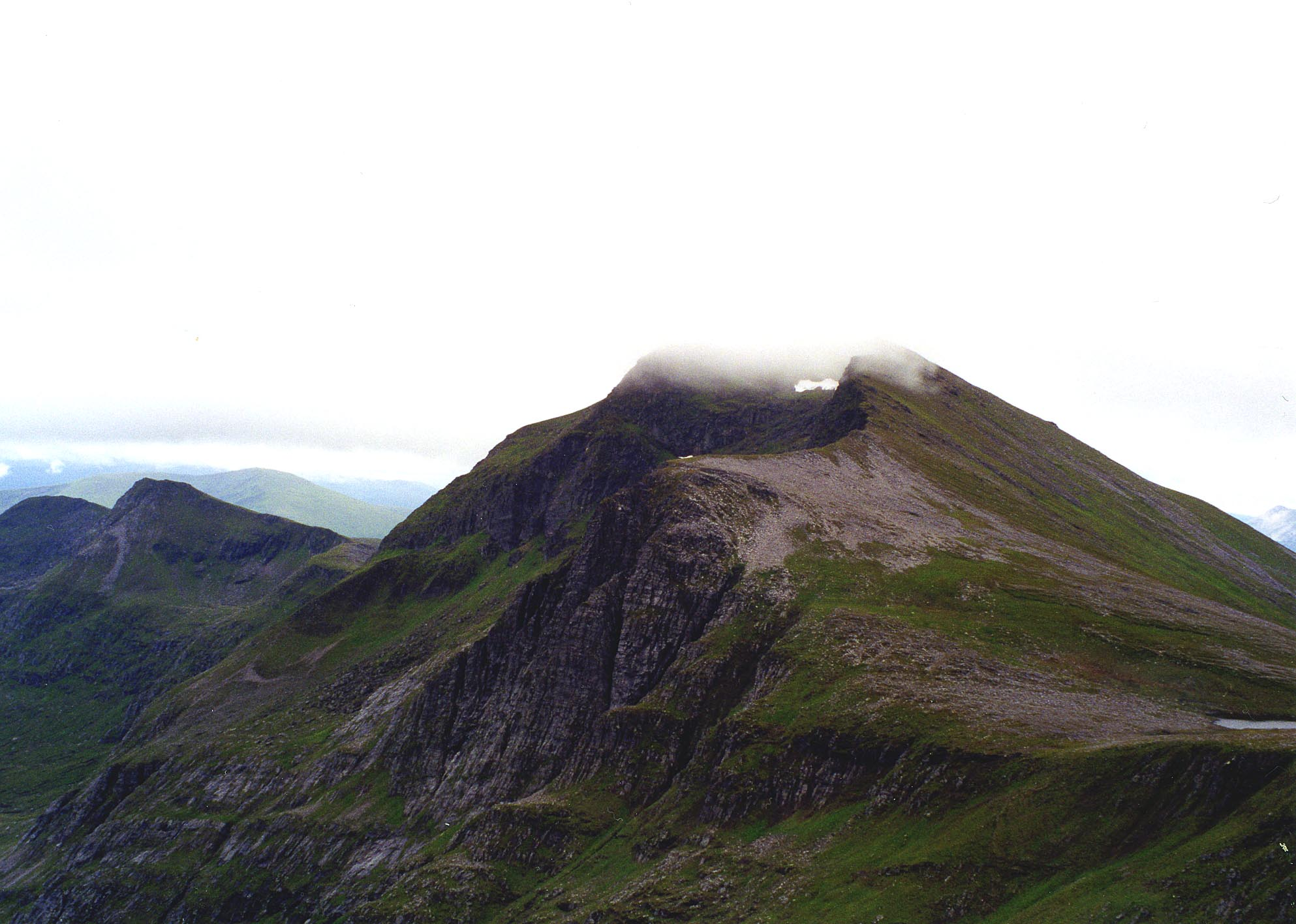
- Sgùrr nan Clach Geala from Carn na Crice, 2 km to the NE. The rocky buttresses of the north ridge can be seen.

Highest point
- Elevation: 1,093 m (3,586 ft)
- Prominence: 228 m (748 ft)
- Listing: Munro, Marilyn

Naming
- English translation: peak of the white stone
- Language of name: Gaelic
- Pronunciation: Scottish Gaelic: [ˈs̪kuːrˠ nəŋ ˈkʰl̪ˠax ˈkʲal̪ˠə]

Geography
- Location: Ross and Cromarty, Highland, Scotland
- Parent range: Fannichs, Northwest Highlands
- OS grid: NH184715
- Topo map: OS Landranger 20, OS Explorer 436

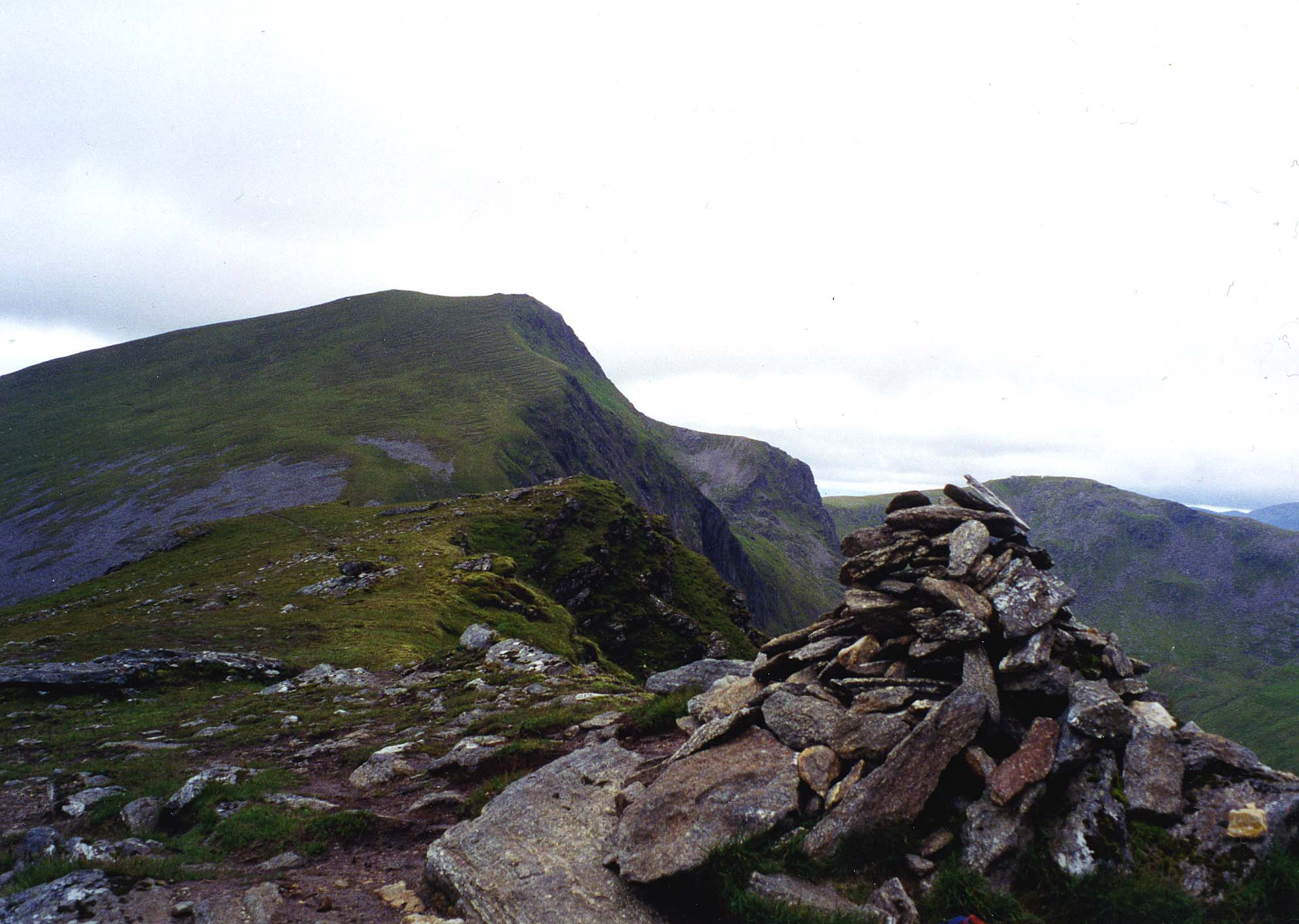
Sgùrr nan Clach Geala seen from the cairn on Sgùrr nan Each, two km to the south.

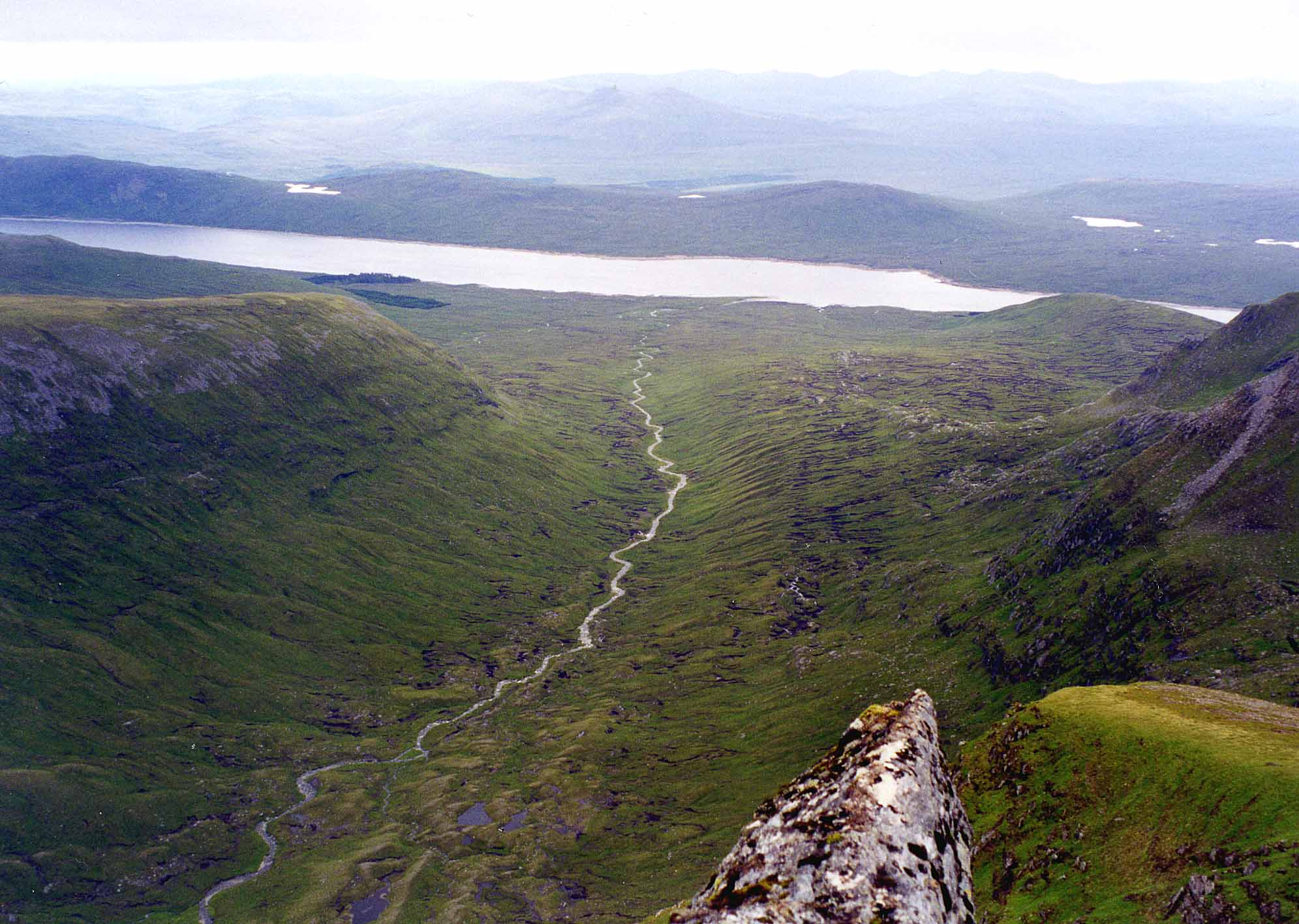
Looking south from the summit down the Allt a' Choire Mhoir to Loch Fannich.

Sgùrr nan Clach Geala is a mountain in Wester Ross in the Northwest Highlands of Scotland, south of Ullapool. With a height of 1,093 metres (3,586 ft), it is one of ten Munros in the group of hills known as the Fannichs.

== Overview ==
With a height of 1093 metres (3586 feet) Sgùrr nan Clach Geala is the second highest of the Fannaichs behind Sgùrr Mòr and is regarded by many as the best peak of the group with its fine east facing corrie and pointed buttresses. The hill is not easily seen from any public road being situated in the centre of the group some eight kilometres from the A832 road to the south. The best views are from nearby mountains with the eastern cliffs being seen to best effect from Sgùrr Mòr across Coire Mòr. The hills name translates from the Gaelic as "Peak of the White Stone", this refers to an area of light coloured quartzite rocks near the summit.

== Geography ==
Sgùrr nan Clach Geala stands on a north-south ridge in the western part of the Fannichs along with two other Munros, Meall a' Chrasgaidh and Sgùrr nan Each. From a distance the mountain’s north ridge can look difficult to traverse with its craggy buttresses which can give mild scrambling if the edge of the corrie is followed, however there are no real difficulties and any problems can be easily by-passed. This northern ridge drops down to a col with a height of 819 metres called Am Biachdaich (The Feeding Place), named because of the col's rich pastures where deer often feed. From the col the Munros of Meall a' Chrasgaidh and Sgùrr Mòr can be climbed, a small lochan lies on the col. The southern ridge of the mountain connects to the Munro of Sgùrr nan Each, which lies just under two kilometres away across a col with a height of 815 metres.

The mountains western slopes are mostly grassy with a few rocky outcrops as they drop down to the valley of the Allt Breabaig. The mountains best geological feature are its eastern cliffs, the highest in the Fannichs which fall 400 metres to the head of Coire Mòr. These Schist cliffs have attracted winter ice climbers with 20 named routes available, the best known being Skyscraper Buttress and Gamma Gully. Drainage from the mountain reaches both coasts of Scotland, rainfall on the west and northern slopes go via the River Broom and Loch Broom to reach the west coast at Ullapool. Drainage from the south and east flank goes south to Loch Fannich to eventually reach the east coast at the Cromarty Firth.

== Ascents and summit ==
The most usual route of ascent approaches from the north starting at a parking spot on the A832 at grid reference NH162760 and climbs the adjoining Munro of Meall a' Chrasgaidh before climbing Sgùrr nan Clach Geala. Most walkers will continue south from the summit to take in Sgùrr nan Each before returning to the starting point via the Allt Breabaig.

The summit of the mountain has the remains of a trig point, it has been vandalised and seems to have been attacked with a sledgehammer, leaving only a quarter of the pillar remaining. The eastern cliffs fall precipitously into Coire Mòr directly from the summit. The view takes in all but one of the Fannichs and is an excellent place to study the geography of the group. There is an excellent view of An Teallach 18 kilometres away to the north west, while the valley of the Allt a‘ Choire Mhoir looks impressive to the south as it flows down to Loch Fannich.
