= Beinn Bhàn =

Beinn Bhàn, meaning White Mountain in Gaelic, is a common name, applied to several hills in different parts of Scotland:

- Beinn Bhàn (Applecross), a 896 m Corbett and Marilyn on the Applecross peninsula
- Beinn Bhàn (Arkaig), a 796 m Corbett and Marilyn south of Loch Arkaig
- Beinn Bhàn (Kilmartin), a 319 m Marilyn near Kilmartin

== See also ==
- Binn Bhán or Benbaun, a 729 m Marilyn in Connemara, Ireland
