= Fionn Bheinn =

Mountain in Scotland

Coordinates: 57.611462°N 5.101456°W

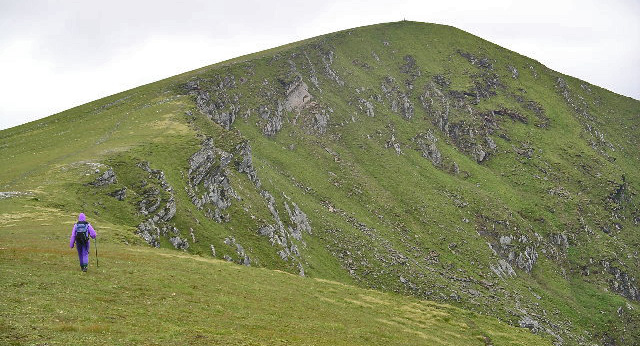
- The summit of Fionn Bheinn from its east ridge

Highest point
- Elevation: 933 m (3,061 ft)
- Prominence: 658 m (2,159 ft)
- Parent peak: Sgurr Mor
- Listing: Munro, Marilyn

Naming
- English translation: white hill
- Language of name: Gaelic
- Pronunciation: Scottish Gaelic: [ˈfjũːn̪ˠveɲ] English approximation: FYOON-vayn

Geography
- Location: Highland, Scotland
- Parent range: Fannichs
- OS grid: NH147621
- Topo map: OS Landranger 50, OS Explorer 435

Fionn Bheinn is a mountain located south of Loch Fannich in the northwestern Scottish Highlands. It has a height of 933 m (3061 ft) and is listed as a Munro. The south side of the mountain is a shallow, smooth grassy slope, but its north face is steeper and is considered more impressive.

Fionn Bheinn is most often climbed from the village of Achnasheen to the south, with the normal route following the burn called Allt Achadh na Sine to the nose at Creagan nan Laogh, and then up the grassy slopes to the summit. An ascent or descent via the east ridge is also common, this route giving better views of the north side of the mountain.
