= Sgùrr nan Each =

Mountain in Scotland

Coordinates: 57°40′51″N 5°2′48″W

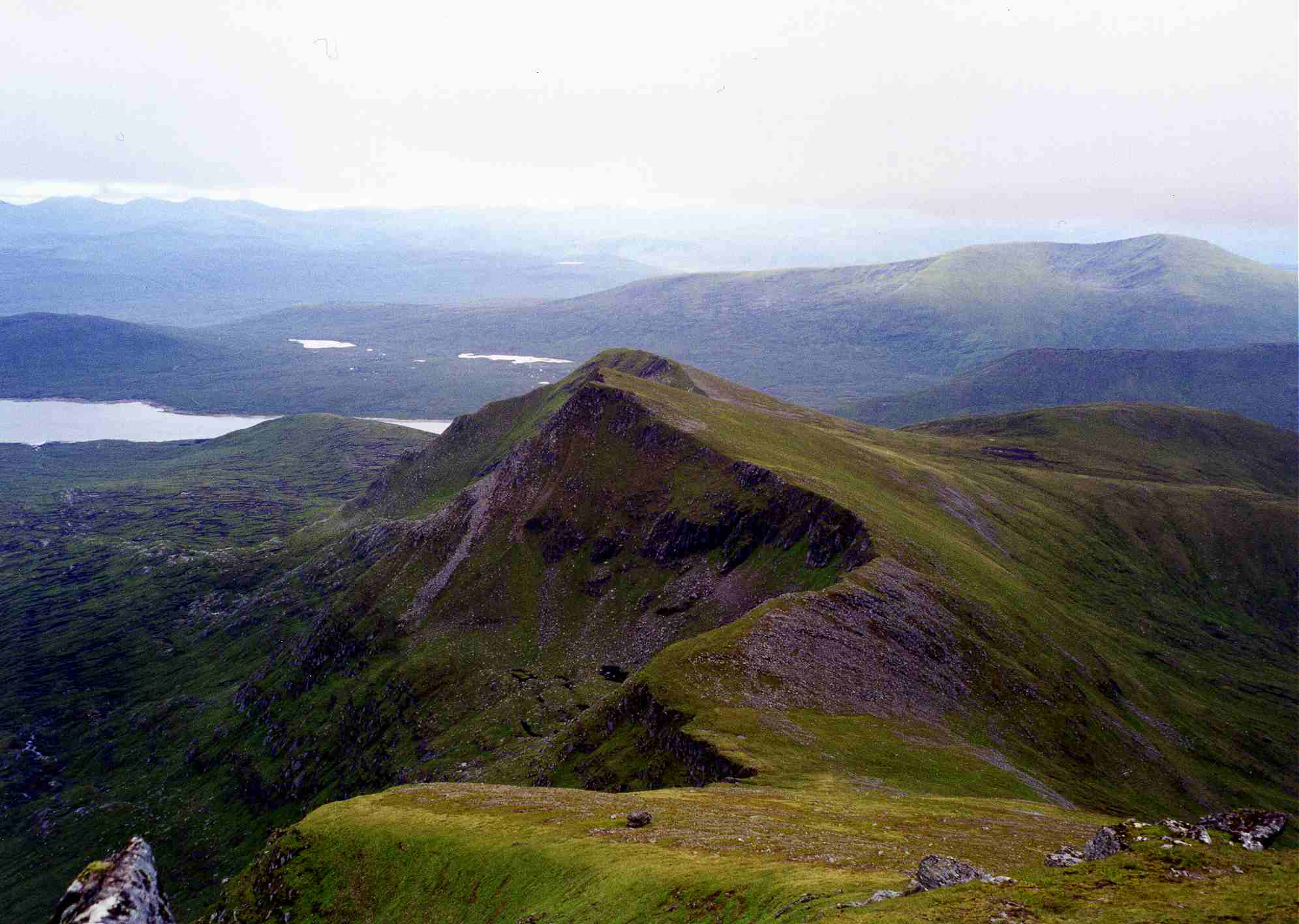
- Sgùrr nan Each from Sgùrr nan Clach Geala, 2 km to the north.

Highest point
- Elevation: 923 m (3,028 ft)
- Prominence: 108 m (354 ft)
- Listing: Munro

Naming
- English translation: Peak of the Horses
- Language of name: Gaelic
- Pronunciation: Scottish Gaelic: [ˈs̪kuːrˠ nə ˈɲɛx]

Geography
- Location: Ross and Cromarty, Highland, Scotland
- Parent range: Fannichs, Northwest Highlands
- OS grid: NH184697
- Topo map: OS Landranger 20, OS Explorer 436

Sgùrr nan Each is a Scottish mountain situated in the group of hills known as the Fannichs. It is 27 kilometres (17 mi) south of Ullapool in the Ross and Cromarty district of the Highland council area.

== Overview ==
Sgùrr nan Each is not an easy mountain to view from any main road, being set in the interior of the Fannichs with lines of sight often blocked by the other nine Munros in the group. It overlooks Loch Fannich and reaches a height of 923 metres (3,028 ft) making it the 266th highest Munro. Its name originates from the Gaelic language and translates as “Peak of the Horses”.

== Geography ==
Sgùrr nan Each stands on a spur that goes south off the main Fannichs ridge. This ridge, which is scalloped and steep on its eastern side, also contains the adjoining and higher Munro of Sgùrr nan Clach Geala, which stands 2 kilometres (1.2 mi) to the north. The two mountains are joined by a ridge that is sharp in places and provides some minor scrambling and has a low point of 815 metres (2,674 ft). Sgùrr nan Each falls away abruptly on its eastern flanks with crags in places to the valley of the Allt a’ Choire Mhòir. To the west, the slopes are grassy and moderate down to the 700-metre (2,300 ft) contour before falling abruptly to the head of Loch Fannich. To the south, the ridge continues over the subsidiary top of Sgùrr a' Chadha Dheirg (866 metres or 2,841 feet) before dropping down to the shores of Loch Fannich.

All drainage from the mountain goes south to Loch Fannich to find its way to the Cromarty Firth via the rivers Grudie and Conon. The mountain is made up of the metamorphic rock schist with infusions of mica and quartz. The mountain lies within the Fannich Hills Site of Special Scientific Interest and Special Area of Conservation because of its profusion of bogs, marshes, and water-fringed vegetation, although the area is primarily managed as a deer forest, and herds can be regularly seen in the corries and on the lower slopes of the mountain.

== Ascents ==
Sgùrr nan Each is a minor peak among the Fannichs, therefore it is invariably climbed in junction with other hills of the group. The most popular ascent is from the north, starting at a lay by on the A832 road at grid reference NH162760. This route climbs the Munros of Meall a' Chrasgaidh and Sgùrr nan Clach Geala first before continuing south along the ridge to the top of Sgùrr nan Each. It is also possible to climb the highest peak of the Fannichs, Sgùrr Mòr, on this walk by an out and back trip from the col between the first two Munros.

An approach from the south is possible but a mountain bike is required for the 15-kilometre (9.3 mi) ride to the foot of the south ridge. The ride uses the hydro road from the locked gates at Grudie on the A835 at grid reference NH310624. The road is tarmac as far as the Fannich dam then becomes a track which passes Fannich Lodge to reach the south ridge from where the mountain can be climbed. A number of years ago it was possible to obtain a key for the locked gate at Grudie and drive a car as far as the dam. Several mountain guide writers recommend this southern approach for a long day in the hills which takes in seven of the Fannich Munros. There was formerly a bothy known as the “Nest of Fannich” situated on Sgùrr nan Each’s lower south west slopes by the loch which a great help when climbing mountains in this area, the bothy burned down several years ago. The highlight of the view from the top of Sgùrr nan Each is the western panorama which takes in the Fisherfield Forest, Slioch and the Torridon Hills.
