= Càrn Dearg, Monadh Liath =

Peak in the Scottish Highlands

Càrn Dearg
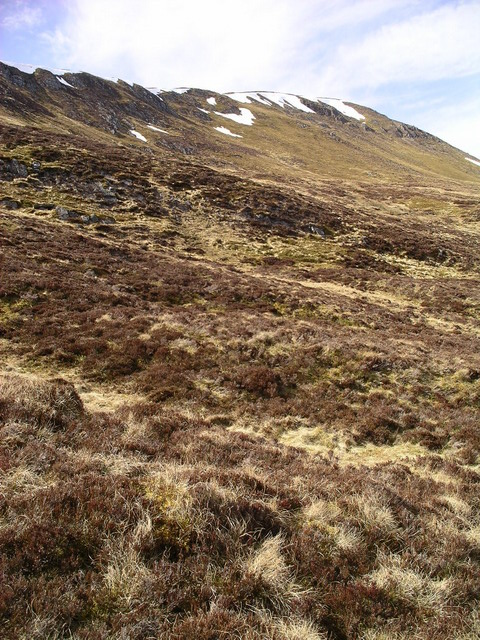
- Slopes of Càrn Dearg, from the south-east

Highest point
- Elevation: 945 m (3,100 ft)
- Prominence: 590 m (1,940 ft)
- Parent peak: Creag Meagaidh
- Listing: Munro, Marilyn
- Coordinates: 57°05′31″N 4°15′08″W

Naming
- English translation: red cairn
- Language of name: Gaelic
- Pronunciation: Scottish Gaelic: [ˈkʰaːrˠn ˈtʲɛɾɛk]

Geography
- Location within Highland
- Location: Highland, Scotland
- Parent range: Monadh Liath
- OS grid: NH635023
- Topo map: OS Landranger 35

Càrn Dearg is the highest peak of the Monadh Liath mountains in the Highlands of Scotland. Its eastern flanks slope steeply down into Glen Ballach, while to the north, the large plateau of the Monadh Liath extends for many miles. The nearest settlements are Newtonmore and Kingussie in the Spey valley. The rocky slopes of Carn Dearg and A' Chailleach contrast with the remainder of the Monadh Liath, which are described by Cameron McNeish as "sprawling, undistinguished affairs".
