= Ashok Bhan =

Indian civil servant

Dr Ashok Bhan
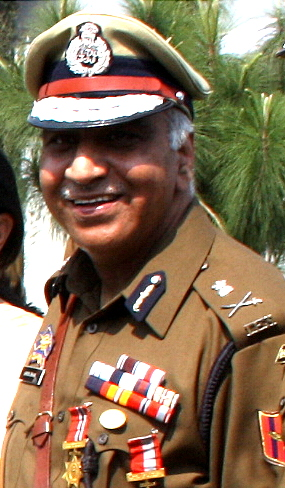

Director General of Police
- In office 1976-2010

Personal details
- Born: 1 April 1950 (age 76) Srinagar, Jammu & Kashmir, India
- Education: PhD in Botany, Kurukshetra University (1974)
- Occupation: Retired Police Officer
- Awards: Police Medal (Meritorious Service); President's Police Medal (Distinguished Service); Police Medal (Gallantry); Wound Medal; Sher-i-Kashmir Police Medal (Gallantry); Sher-i-Kashmir Police Medal (Meritorious Service)

Ashok Bhan (born 1 April 1950) is a retired Indian Police Service officer (J&K-1976). A PhD in Botany, Dr. Bhan held important positions in Jammu and Kashmir State Government including that of the Commissioner of Vigilance, Director General of Police (Intelligence) and Director General of Police (Prisons). After his retirement, he served as a Member of the National Security Advisory Board (2010-2012). During his service career he acquired expertise in Anti — Terrorist operations, Intelligence and Anti-Corruption, Issues related to governance, Security of VIPs and Vital Installations, Recruitment and Training.
He is currently a Member of Shri Mata Vaishno Devi Shrine Board (2012- ), Patron, J&K Regional Branch, Indian Institute of Public Administration; Member University Court, Central University of Jammu and Distinguished Fellow, Institute of Peace and Conflict Studies, New Delhi.

== Biography ==
Dr Ashok Bhan, joined the Indian Police Service in 1976 and retired in the rank of Director General of Police in 2010. During his career, he served the State and the Center in various capacities, including assistant director at IB Headquarters, SSP in districts of Anantnag and Rajouri, Director Police Training College, DIG Jammu, IGP Kashmir Zone, IGP Armed Police, IGP Security, Additional DGP (CID), Commissioner of Vigilance, DGP (CID) and DGP (Prisons). Dr Bhan is recipient of DGP Commendation Medal, Police Medal for Meritorious Service, President's Police Medal for Distinguished Service, Police Medal for Gallantry, Sher-i-Kashmir Police Medal for Gallantry, Sher-i-Kashmir Police Medal for Meritorious Service, Chief Minister's gold medal for Honesty, Integrity and Meritorious Public Service and Paul H Appleby Award 2016 by Indian Institute of Public Administration, New Delhi for rendering outstanding services to the Institute and to the field of Public Administration . He attended the Indian Police Service Command Course in England in 1987 and Indian Senior Crisis Management Course at Washington D.C., United States in 2006.

== Notable positions held ==
Appointments	Tenure
Member, Shri Mata Vaishno Devi Shrine Board - Jammu & Kashmir	2012–15; 2015 – 2018; 2019-
Member National Security Advisory Board	2010–12
Patron, J&K Regional Branch, Indian Institute of Public Administration - Jammu & Kashmir	2015–present
Member University Court, Central University of Jammu	2017–present
Member, J&K State Audit Advisory Board - Jammu & Kashmir	2013–14; 2015–17
Distinguished Fellow, Institute of Peace and Conflict Studies - New Delhi	Present
Chairman, J&K Regional Branch of Indian Institute of Public Administration and Member, Executive Council, IIPA, New Delhi	2010-14
Director General of Police (Prisons) - Jammu & Kashmir	2009–10
Director General of Police, CID (Intelligence) - Jammu & Kashmir	2008-09
Commissioner of Vigilance - Jammu & Kashmir	2005-08
Inspector General of Police Kashmir Zone	1999–01
Member of Expert Committee on Police Re-organization constituted by Government of J&K	1995
Served in Intelligence Bureau New Delhi	1982–86

== Major Awards ==
1. Paul H Appleby Award 2016 by Indian Institute of Public Administration, New Delhi as a Distinguished Member of the IIPA for rendering outstanding services to the Institute and to the field of Public Administration

2. Chief Minister's gold medal for Honesty, Integrity and Meritorious Public Service (2007)
3. Sher-i-Kashmir Police Medal for Meritorious Service (15 August 2003)
4. Sher-i-Kashmir Police Medal for Gallantry (18 October 2002)
5. Police Medal for Gallantry (2002)
6. President's Police Medal for Distinguished Service (1998)
7. Police Medal for Meritorious Service (1991)
8. Wound Medal after getting critically injured in an Ambush in 1990
9. DGP's Commendation Medal (1990)

== Areas of Specialization and Notable Contribution ==
Spearheaded the response by Police and Security forces to heightened terrorist violence in the wake of Kargil conflict as IGP Kashmir Zone (1999-01). As Head of the State Intelligence (2004–05 and 2008–09) coordinated with other forces and agencies various intelligence operations, interrogations, detentions, lodging, investigations and prosecution of terrorists, separatists and over ground workers

Lectured widely in Areas of Specialization in Training Institutes in and outside J&K. The subjects of talks included: "Preparedness to fight Terror", "Suicidal Attacks", "Criminal Justice System", "Terrorist Infrastructure", "Interrogation Techniques", "Prison Administration in J&K", "Strengthening of Internal Vigilance in Government Departments", "Pro-active Vigilance in J&K", "Ethics in Administration", "Human Rights", "Current situation in Jammu and Kashmir" etc.

Author of J&K Vigilance Manual, J&K Special Branch Manual and SSG Manual for protection of Chief Minister. As a Member Secretary drafted report of the Expert Committee on Police Re-organization set up by the Government in 1995 to Revamp Jammu and Kashmir Police. Founder editor of J&K Police Newsletter, J&K Prisons Newsletter, Police Training College Newsletter and IIPA JK Regional Branch Newsletter

Expertise in recruitment, training and event management. Recruited a battalion of JKAP. Paper setter and Chief Examiner in recruitment of Sub-Inspectors on a number of occasions. Headed premier training institute of J&K twice. In the wake of Re-organization of J&K Police created/restarted training centers at Talwara (Reasi), Manigam (Ganderbal) and Sheeri (Baramulla). Revised Syllabi for all courses to lay emphasis on investigation, scientific aides, human rights and ethics

Contributed in Modernization of J&K Police. As Inspector General of Police Modernization drafted plans which were approved and funded in a phased manner by Government of India

Supervised Policing/Security arrangements for VVIP's. Actively contributed in planning and successful holding of assembly elections in 1996, 2002 and 2008. Drafted plans for security of vital installations including Airports, Religious places and Government buildings. Contributed in formulating the Government's response to the wide spread land row agitation in J&K in 2008

As Head of State Vigilance Organizations for 3 and half years established a strong network to target corrupt public servants and corruption breeding practices. Introduced a system of Preventive Vigilance by issuing alert notes and establishing the institution of Departmental Vigilance Officers

As an event manager organized first six chapters of J&K Police Martyrs Memorial Football Tournament in Srinagar. Contributed in organizing colour presentation function to J&K Police by the President of India. Supervised organizing of Inter battalion, Inter zone and All India Police sports. For the first time BPRD sponsored Training programmes for the Prison Officers from rest of the country were hosted by J&K Prisons Department

Carried out reforms in J&K Prisons by introducing Vocational Training Programmes, Rehabilitation Schemes and drafting a modernization plan for J&K Prisons. Emphasis was given on training of staff in Human Rights through the State Human Rights Commission and ICRC

== Related Weblinks ==
http://jkpolice.gov.in/
https://www.maavaishnodevi.org/
http://www.iipajkbranch.com/
https://web.archive.org/web/20190810004313/https://jkgad.nic.in/
http://www.ipcs.org/

== See also ==
- Indian Police Service
- Indian Police
- Jammu & Kashmir Police
- List of people from Jammu and Kashmir
- Vaishno Devi
- Indian Institute of Public Administration
