= Sgùrr Ghiubhsachain =

Mountain in Scotland

Coordinates: 56.81958°N 5.48361°W

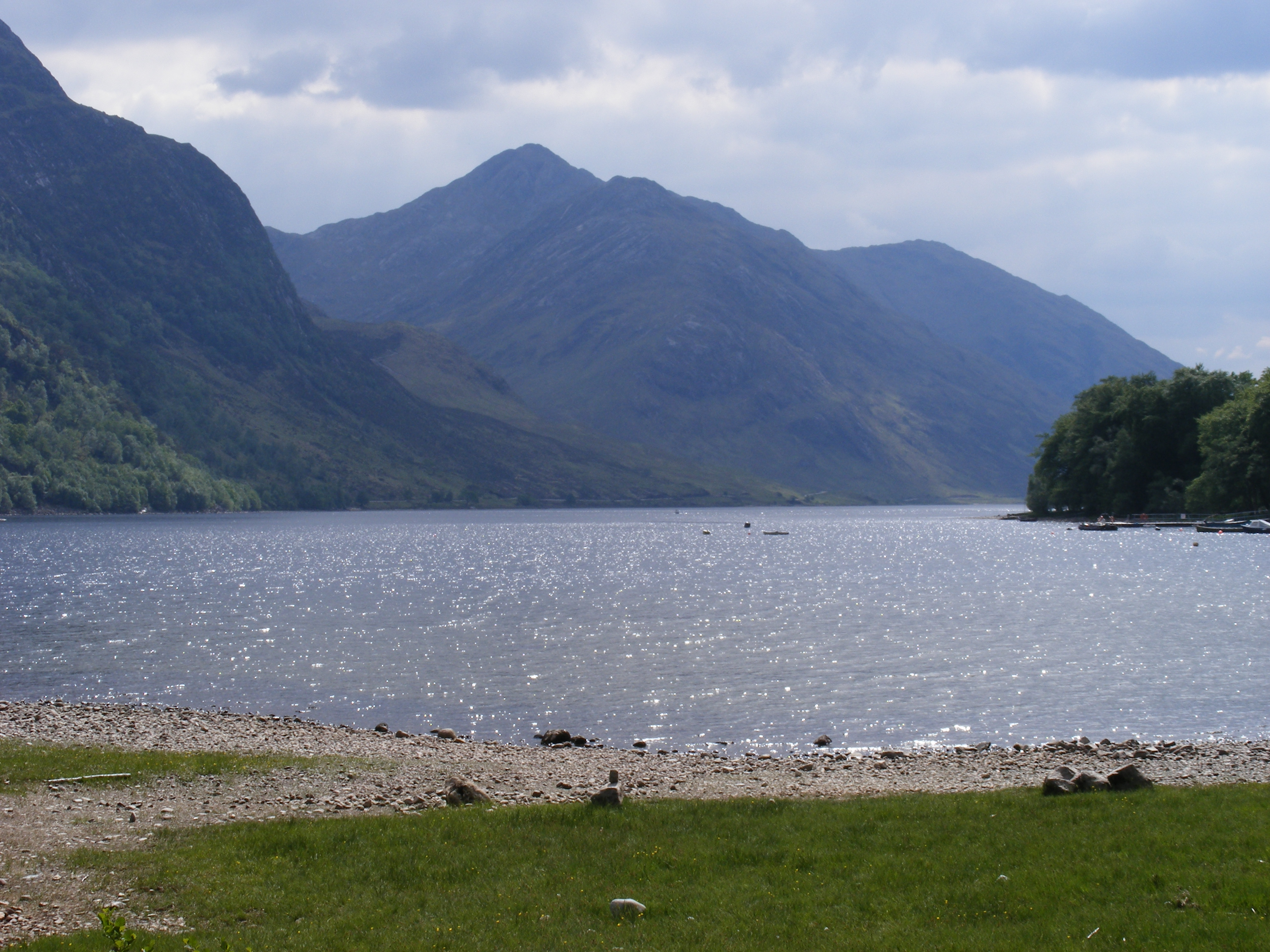
- Sgùrr Ghiubhsachain and Loch Shiel from Glenfinnan

Highest point
- Elevation: 849 m (2,785 ft)
- Prominence: 614 m (2,014 ft); Ranked 106th in British Isles
- Parent peak: Sgùrr Dhòmhnuill
- Listing: Corbett, Marilyn, P600

Naming
- English translation: Peak of the fir-wood
- Language of name: Scottish Gaelic
- Pronunciation: Scottish Gaelic: [ˈs̪kuːrˠ ə ˈʝuːs̪əxɛɲ]

Geography
- Location: West Lochaber, Highland, Scotland
- Parent range: Northwest Highlands
- OS grid: NM875752
- Topo map: OS Landranger 40

Sgùrr Ghiubhsachain is a mountain in the Lochaber area in the west of Scotland. Its summit is the highest point in a group of mountains that stand south of Glenfinnan, to the south east of the northern part of Loch Shiel. It is considerably lower than the nearby Nevis range, but it is a long way from a public road. Its slopes are steep and rugged on all sides and are devoid of paths. Despite easy access to the trail head from the road from Fort William to Mallaig, an individual or party that climbs this mountain may be alone there, even on a fine day in the summer.

== Ascents ==
The best starting point is a car park at Callop, which is close to the A830 road which connects Fort William and Mallaig. From here, there are two possible routes, via the banks of Loch Shiel, or via the Allt na Cruaiche.

=== Loch Shiel Route ===
From Callop, a forestry vehicle track heads westwards, then continues south west along the banks of Loch Shiel. Those returning by the same route can save time by using a bicycle. After about 6 km, this track reaches a small cottage at Guesachan, from where the north ridge can be ascended. The ridge is steep and craggy, and may require scrambling in places. The guidebooks recommend bypassing the lower part of the ridge via the Allt Coire Ghiubhsachain, but not all authorities agree that this is necessary. After gaining a subsidiary summit at an elevation of about 820 metres, the route continues along a short ridge via a minor col to the main summit, which is marked by a large cairn.

If returning by the Allt na Cruaiche route (see below), a direct descent of the south east face may be obstructed by steep slabs, but these can be avoided by first returning to the minor col.

=== Allt na Cruaiche route ===
From Callop, a path follows a course west of the Allt na Cruaiche, eventually reaching an elevation of 400 metres before descending into Cona Glen. The path is not in good condition; parts of it are boggy enough to support tadpole populations, and at the time of writing (June 2008), some of the lower part had been bulldozed away to construct a service road for a new hydro-electric development. From the high point of the path, the route traverses up to the 600 m col to the north east of Sgùrr Ghiubhsachain; from the col, the route to the minor col between the main and subsidiary summits avoids the steep slabs.

=== Sgorr Craobh a'Chaorainn ===
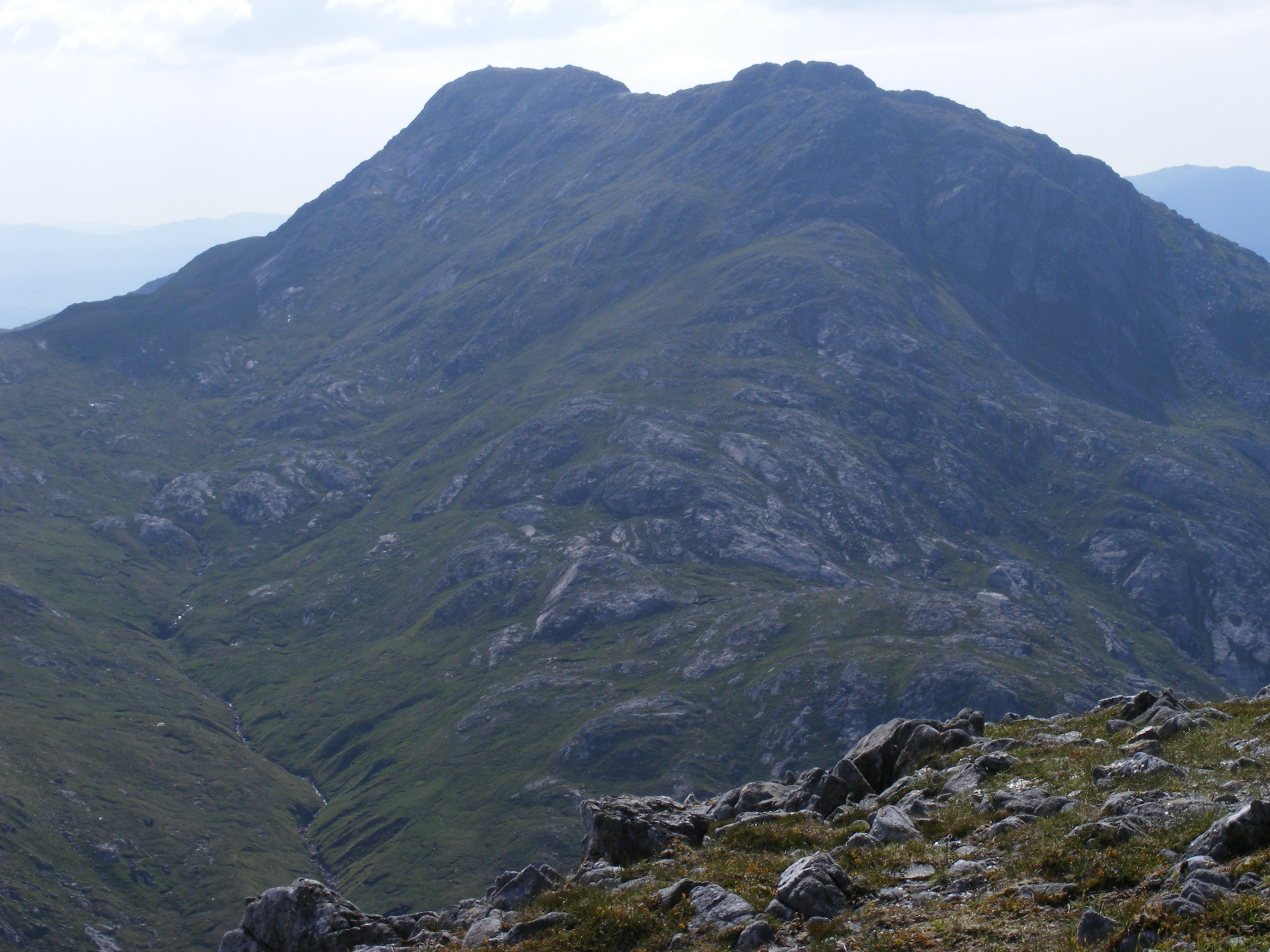
Sgùrr Ghiubhsachain from the summit of Sgorr Craobh a'Chaorainn

Corbett and Marilyn baggers can include Sgorr Croabh a Chaorainn (rowantree peak), to the north east of the above-mentioned 600 m col, within their itinerary. A crossing of this peak provides a good alternative to part of the Cruaiche path. There are steep sections that may require scrambling; a step to the west of the summit can be bypassed on the south side.
