= A' Chailleach (Fannichs) =

Mountain in Highland, Scotland

Coordinates: 57.694°N 5.128°W

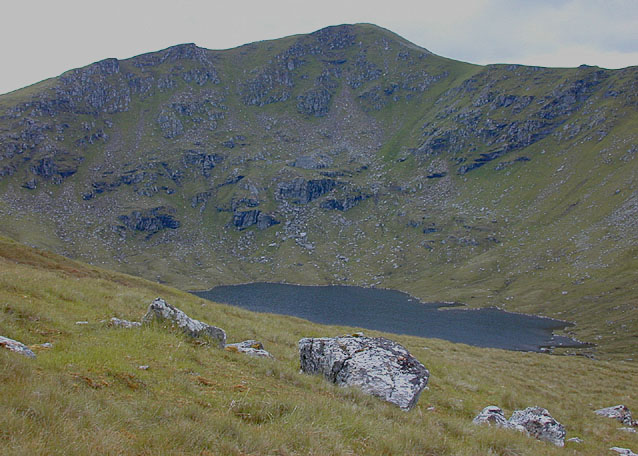
- A' Chailleach

Highest point
- Elevation: 997 m (3,271 ft)
- Prominence: 182 m (597 ft)
- Listing: Munro, Marilyn

Geography
- Location within Highland
- Location: Wester Ross, Scotland
- Parent range: Northwest Highlands
- OS grid: NH136714
- Topo map: OS Landranger 19

A' Chailleach (Scottish Gaelic for 'the old woman or Cailleach') is a mountain in the Northwest Highlands of Scotland. It lies in the Fannichs of Wester Ross. It is a Munro with a height of 997 metres (3,271 ft).

The most westerly of the Fannichs, it offers superb views of the Fisherfield Forest and An Teallach from its summit. It is usually climbed in conjunction with Sgurr Breac. The nearest village is Kinlochewe to the southwest.
