= A' Chailleach (Monadhliath Mountains) =

Mountain in Highland, Scotland

Coordinates: 57.109603°N 4.17941°W

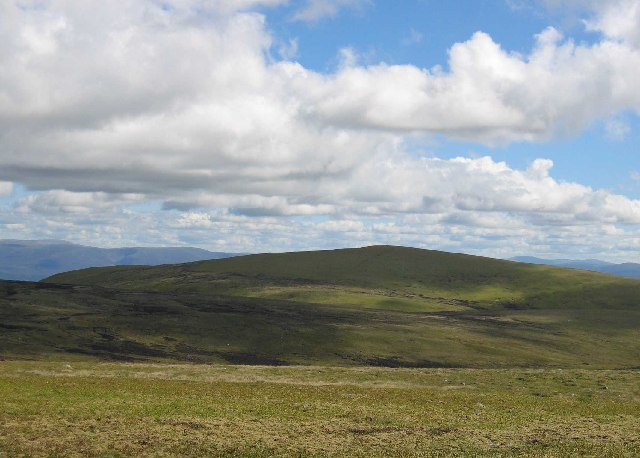
- View of A' Chailleach from Meall a' Bhothain

Highest point
- Elevation: 929 m (3,048 ft)
- Prominence: 108 m (354 ft)
- Listing: Munro

Naming
- English translation: the old woman
- Language of name: Scottish Gaelic

Geography
- Location within Highland
- Location: Highland, Scotland
- Parent range: Monadhliath Mountains
- OS grid: NH681041

A' Chailleach (Scottish Gaelic for 'the old woman or Cailleach') is one of the Monadhliath Mountains of Scotland. It lies seven kilometres (4 1/2 miles) northwest of Newtonmore and the Spey Valley. It is a Munro with a summit elevation of 929 metres (3,048 ft).
