= Sgùrr Breac =

Mountain in Scotland

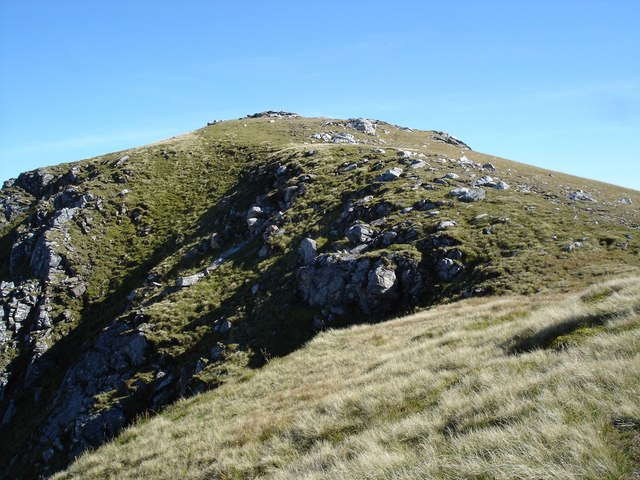
- The summit of Sgùrr Breac

Highest point
- Elevation: 999 m (3,278 ft)
- Prominence: 451 m (1,480 ft)
- Listing: Munro, Marilyn
- Coordinates: 57°41′32″N 5°05′30″W

Naming
- English translation: Spotted Peak

Geography
- Location: Wester Ross, Scotland
- Parent range: Northwest Highlands
- OS grid: NH158711
- Topo map: OS Landranger 20

Sgùrr Breac is a mountain with a height of 999 metres (3,278 ft) in Wester Ross in the Northwest Highlands of Scotland. A remote mountain, Sgùrr Breac is part of the Fannichs range, and has a very steep north face. It is usually climbed from its eastern side. The nearest settlement is Auchindrean.
