= Monadhliath Mountains =

Mountain range in Scotland

Coordinates: 57°10′N 4°00′W

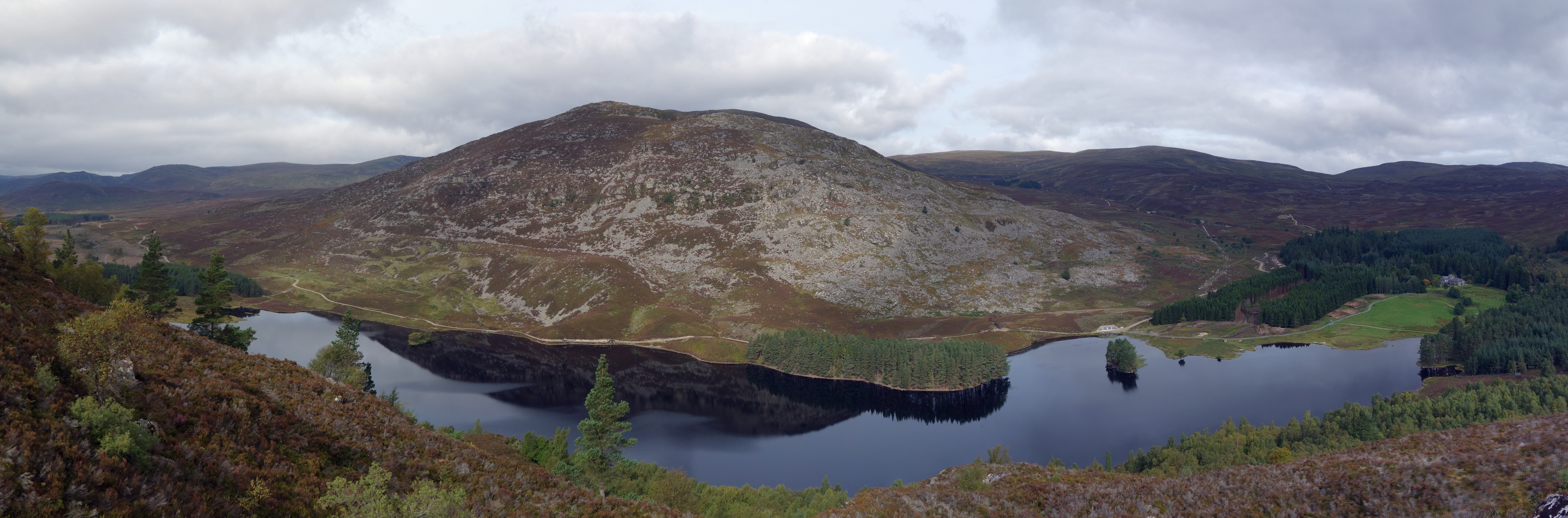
Part of the Monadhliath Mountains, with Creag Mhor overlooking Loch Gynack in the foreground

The Monadhliath Mountains /ˌmoʊnəˈliːə/, or Monadh Liath, are a range of mountains in Scotland. Monadh Liath is Scottish Gaelic, and means "grey mountain range". Running in a northeast to southwest direction, it lies on the western side of Strathspey, to the west of the Cairngorms and to the south east of Loch Ness. Its southwestern limit is usually taken to be Corrieyairack Pass (763 m) but similar uplands continue to Glen Roy and Spean Bridge. The range is within the Highland council area, and the south and east fringes are within the Cairngorms National Park. The high point of the range is Càrn Dearg, at 945 metres (3,100 ft), located 40 kilometres (25 mi) south of Inverness. This is one of four Munros in the Monadhliath, the others being A'Chailleach (930 m or 3,050 ft), Geal Chàrn (926 m or 3,038 ft), and Càrn Sgulain (920 m or 3,020 ft). Part of the Monadhliath Mountains are designated a Special Area of Conservation (SAC) due to the presence of blanket bog. Monadhliath SAC is also a Site of Special Scientific Interest (SSSI). Part of Monadhliath SSSI is part of the River Spey SAC due to the presence of atlantic salmon, otters, sea lamprey and freshwater pearl mussel.

The Monadh Liath differs greatly in character from the greater Highland mountains to the south and west, as an elevated moorland with no proper ridges. The four Munros are all on the Spey rim, three making a classic circuit from Newtonmore; the interior is rarely visited. The main valley within the Monadh Liath is the Findhorn. It is unusually sinuous, being an incised meandering river valley very little altered by glaciers.

The landscape of the Monadh Liath is one of the most ancient in Britain, its essentials as a secondary massif flanking the Cairngorms having evolved continuously since the Caledonian Mountains were created over 400 million years ago. Thus the land surface still slopes gently northwest towards the Great Glen, away from the main Grampian divide which crosses the Cairngorms.

Although icesheets have repeatedly covered the Monadh Liath, they have done little to change its character: there are no corries away from the Munros fringe, and only a few short glaciated troughs, notably Glen Killin on the north. It has just become recognised that thin ice on the plateau is frozen to the ground, but as it starts to flow into the troughs it thickens, accelerates, and warms up so it can erode and enlarge them. This has occurred as recently as the last (Younger Dryas) glacial period ~12000 years ago.

The interior of the Monadh Liath is remote and desolate, with little remaining native tree cover. This is a result of human activity, deforestation and overgrazing by sheep and deer over the last thousand years, in common with much of the Scottish Highlands. The renewable energy gold rush has already led to the Glendoe Hydro Scheme above Fort Augustus. The actual reservoir and dam are not unduly intrusive, but the extensive network of heavy-duty access roads to service all the weirs diverting water into the catchment have altered its remoteness and wildness. These roads have also facilitated a very large wind energy project, one of several encouraged by proximity to the high-capacity Beauly-Denny power transmission line over Corrieyairack Pass, and which now dominate the NW Grampian skyline in views from the Cairngorms and Western Highlands up to 50 miles (80 kilometres) away.
