= Takali Bhan =

Village in Maharashtra

- village
- Location in Maharashtra, India Takali Bhan (India)
- Coordinates: 19°35′0″N 76°45′0″E
- Country: India
- State: Maharashtra
- District: Ahmednagar

Languages
  - Official: Marathi
- Time zone: UTC+5:30 (IST)
- Telephone code: 02422
- Vehicle registration: MH-17
- Coastline: 0 kilometres (0 mi)
- Nearest city: Shrirampur
- Lok Sabha constituency: Shrirampur

Takali Bhan is a small village in Shrirampur taluka, Ahmednagar district, Maharashtra, India.
