= Beinn Bhàn (Arkaig) =

796m high mountain in Scotland

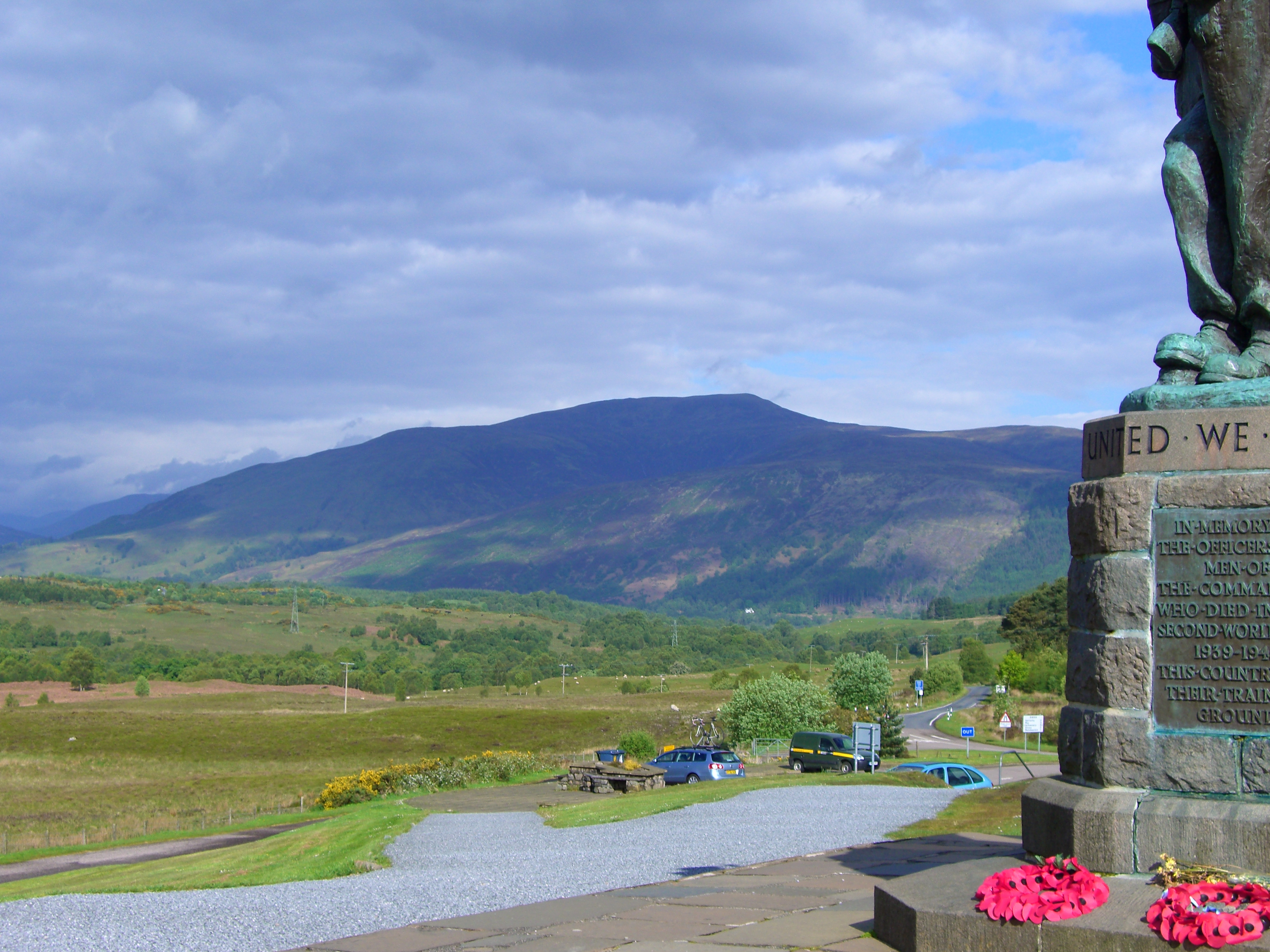
- Seen from the Commando Memorial at Spean Bridge.

Highest point
- Elevation: 796 m (2,612 ft)
- Prominence: 495 m (1,624 ft)
- Listing: Corbett, Marilyn
- Coordinates: 56°55′31″N 5°03′25″W

Naming
- English translation: White Hill
- Language of name: Gaelic

Geography
- Location within Scotland
- Location: Highland, Scotland
- Parent range: Northwest Highlands
- OS grid: NN140857
- Topo map: OS Landranger 34, 41 OS Explorer 399

Climbing
- Easiest route: From Glen Loy

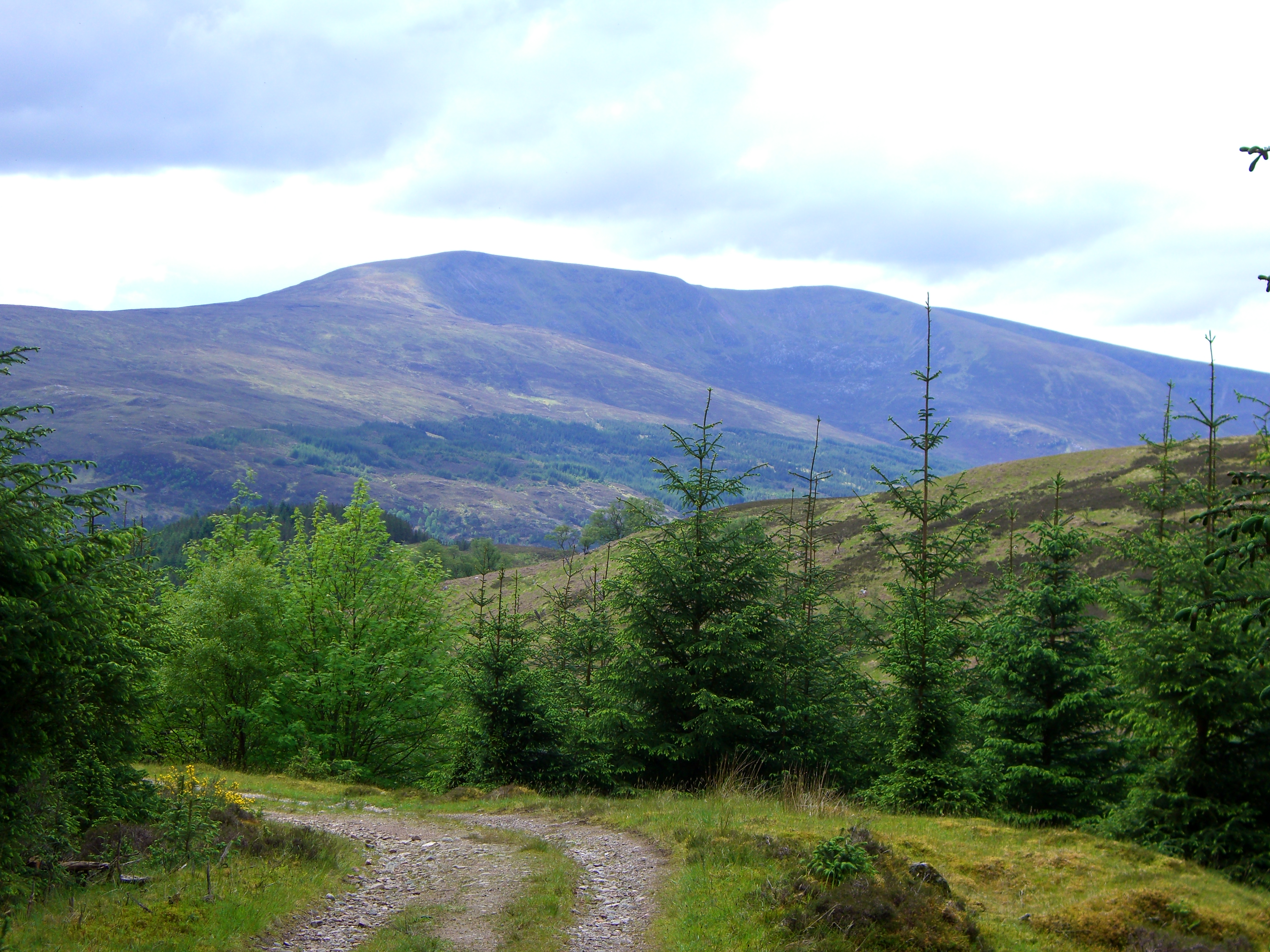
Seen from the woodland on the north side of Loch Arkaig. Coire Dubh is in view.

Beinn Bhàn is a Scottish mountain situated in the Lochaber region of the Highland Council Area. It stands 6 miles (10 km) north-west of Spean Bridge. The hill is not to be confused with another and better known Beinn Bhàn on the Applecross peninsula.

== Overview ==
Beinn Bhàn reaches a height of 796 metres (2612 feet) and qualifies as a Corbett and a Marilyn. The hill stands in Glen Loy, a minor side valley of the Great Glen and hill walkers will sometimes climb Beinn Bhàn along with another Glen Loy Corbett, Meall a' Phubuill to give a full day's walking . The hill's name translates from the Scottish Gaelic language as "White Hill", there are no natural features which could give this name and local knowledge says that the hill is so named because snow lies on Beinn Bhàn earlier than any other hill in the district and it is this well-defined whiteness which led to the naming of the hill. Much of the area around Beinn Bhàn was used for the training of British Commandos and United States Army Rangers during World War II using the training depot at Achnacarry Castle on the NE foothills.

== Geography ==
Standing in a region which has some of the highest mountains in the UK, Beinn Bhàn can be easily overlooked, however it is conspicuous in the view from the Commando Memorial at Spean Bridge, where its long NW ridge is well seen rising from Glen Mallie to the summit ridge overlooking the Great Glen. The hill has three notable corries on its slopes, the south facing Coire Mhuilinn (corrie of the mill) above Glen Loy is smooth and grassy, while the two north facing corries of Coire Bhotrais (corrie of the rough miry holes) and Coire Dubh (black corrie) are more rocky and steeper in nature. All three corries bite significantly and high into the hill to give a two kilometre long narrow curving summit ridge which is above the 750 metre contour for its entire length. The highest point stands at the eastern end of the ridge and there are two lesser and unnamed tops, both with a height of 771 metres situated at the midpoint and western end. 200 metres west of the main summit are several springs which emerge on the summit ridge and are the origins of the stream which flows down Coire Mhuilinn.

== Summit and view ==
The highest point is marked by a trig point and a substantial cairn. The hill has a prominence of 495 metres making it a fine view point. The view north takes in Loch Arkaig and its surrounding mountains but the highlight of the vista is south towards the Ben Nevis range, giving a fine prospect which looks straight up the valley of the Allt a Mhuillin and shows Britain's highest mountain to fine effect along with the neighbouring Càrn Mòr Dearg and Aonach Mòr.

== Routes of ascent ==
The most popular route of ascent and one which is recommended by most guide books approaches from the south, starting at the Inverskilavulin holiday development in Glen Loy. This route uses the ridges on both sides of Coire Mhuilinn for ascent and descent. It is possible to approach Beinn Bhàn from the north, starting on the shore of Loch Arkaig with the possibility of using Invermallie bothy as a base. This route is hindered by the presence of forestry plantations and thick heather on the lower slopes, when this is overcome it is then possible to reach the summit ridge by following the stream up Coire Dubh or using the ridges on either side.
