= Meall a' Chrasgaidh =

Mountain in Scotland

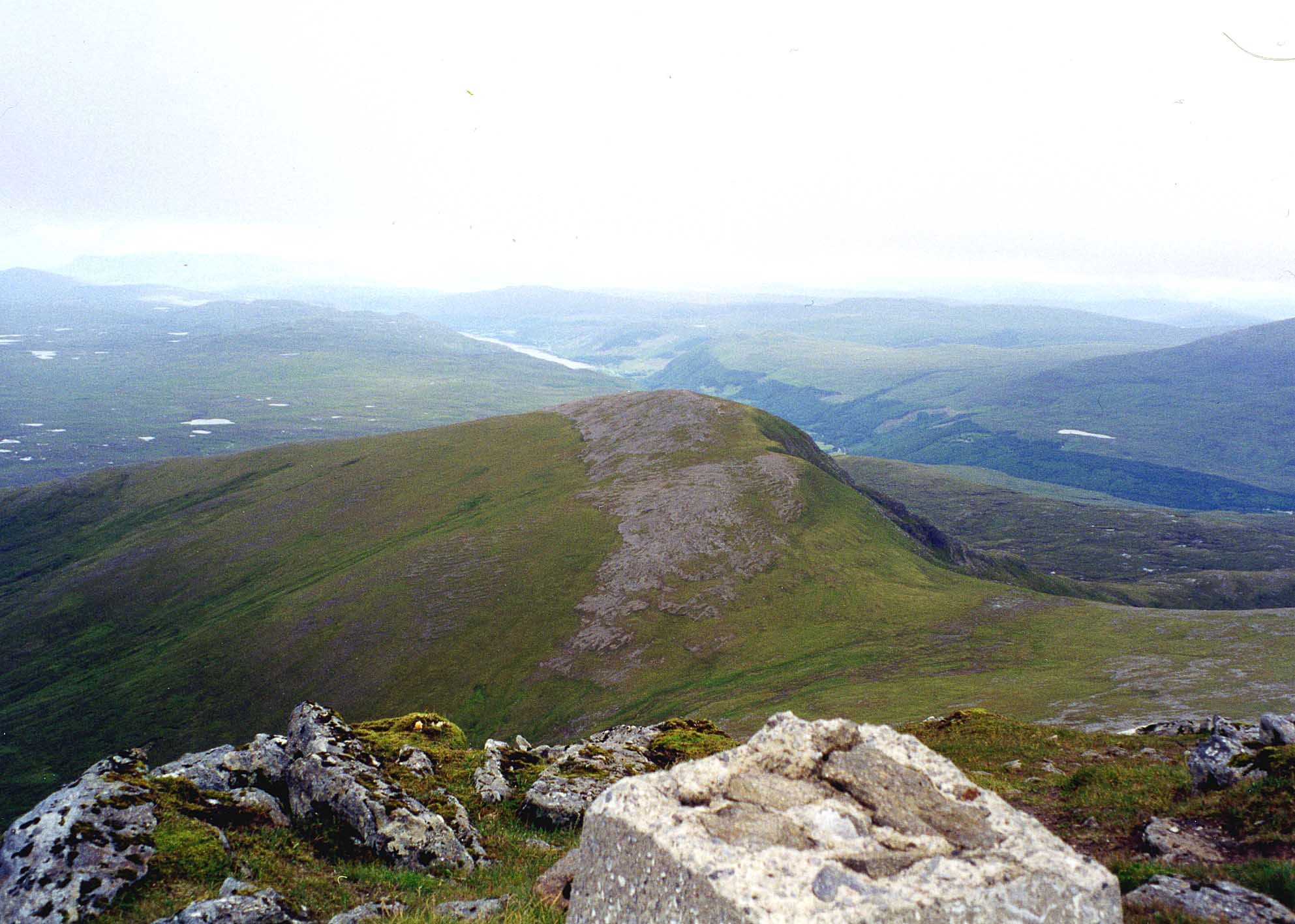
- Meall a' Chrasgaidh seen from the shattered trig point on Sgurr nan Clach Geala.

Highest point
- Elevation: 934 m (3,064 ft)
- Prominence: 115 m (377 ft)
- Listing: Munro
- Coordinates: 57.7124°N 5.0474°W

Naming
- English translation: Hill Of The Crossing
- Language of name: Gaelic
- Pronunciation: Scottish Gaelic: [ˈmjaul̪ˠ ə ˈxɾas̪kɪ]

Geography
- Location: Ross and Cromarty, Highland, Scotland
- Parent range: Fannichs, Northwest Highlands
- OS grid: NH184733
- Topo map: OS Landranger 20, OS Explorer 436

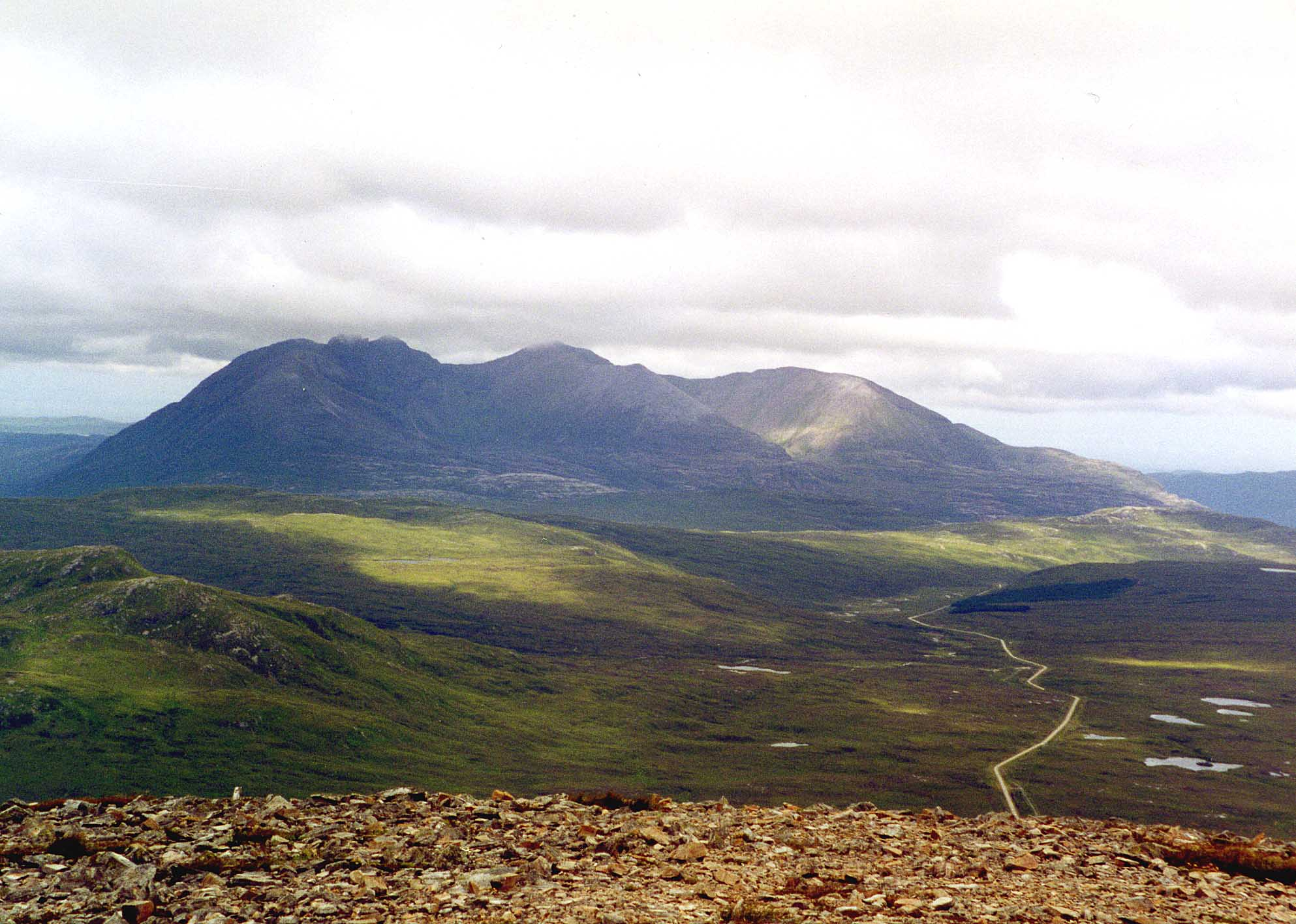
An Teallach seen from the summit of Meall a' Chrasgaidh.

Meall a' Chrasgaidh is a Scottish mountain located in the Fannich group of mountains, 21 kilometres south-southeast of Ullapool.

== Overview ==
The mountain is centrally located within the Fannichs and is one of the most accessible of the group with the A832 and A835 roads running just to the north. It lies on a north-south ridge along with the two other Munros of Sgurr nan Clach Geala and Sgurr nan Each and it is usually ascended along with them. Meall a' Chrasgaidh is a rounded grassy hill which reaches the modest height of 934 metres (3064 ft), being the 242nd highest Munro. The mountains name translates as “Hill of the Crossing” and refers to the 819 metre col to the south of the summit which is the main crossing point in the Fannich group giving access north to south between lochs a’ Bhraoin and Fannich and also between the east and the west.

== Geography ==
Meall a' Chrasgaidh is made up of three distinct ridges, the NW and NE ridges both descend towards the valley of the River Droma and are used as ascent routes from the main roads to the north. The south ridge connects to the strategically important 819 col which is unnamed on maps, the col is boggy and has a small lochan lying within it. The col connects the mountain to the two highest peaks of the Fannichs, Sgurr nan Clach Geala and Sgurr Mòr.

The only steep slopes on the mountain are on its eastern side where rocky flanks descend to Loch a’ Mhadaidh, these slopes are moderately angled and give a scrambling route from the loch. This eastern side shows the mountain at its best and the steeper gradients are well seen from the loch. The western and southern slopes are less steep, they are mostly composed of grass with some heather, nearer the summit there are some exposed mica and quartz schist rocks (see picture) of which the whole mountain is composed. All drainage from Meall a' Chrasgaidh goes to the west coast of Scotland, going via the River Broom and Loch Broom to reach the sea at Ullapool.

== Ascents and view ==
Meall a' Chrasgaidh is usually climbed directly from the north and usually in conjunction with some of the other hills of the Fannich range. There are two possible starting points for the northern approach. One starts at a parking spot on the A832 near Loch a’ Bhraoin (grid reference NH163760) and ascends by the NW ridge after following a track by the Allt Breabaig for two km. The alternative route starts at the western end of Loch Droma on the A835 (grid reference NH253754) and follows the Allt a’ Mhadaidh west for six km to reach Loch Mhadaidh under the eastern face. From here it is possible to ascend the grassy and rocky ground above the loch to reach the 819 metre col from where the summit can be reached via the south ridge. The continuation to other mountains in the group is by descending the south ridge to the 819 metre col.

The summit is crowned by a 5-foot-high (1.5 m) cairn. The view is restricted to the south and SE by the Fannichs two highest mountains Sgurr nan Clach Geala and Sgurr Mòr, both of which look impressive, however in other directions there are fine views. There is a first-rate aspect of An Teallach, some 15 km to the NW across desolate moorland. Around to the north are the hills of Coigach and Assynt.
