= Fannichs =

Mountain range in Scotland

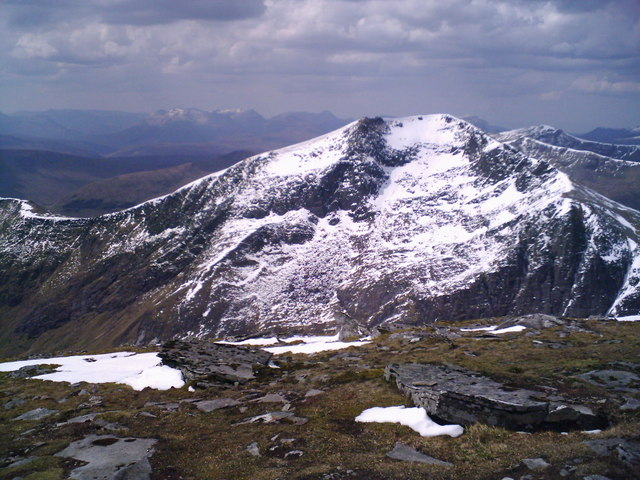

Highest point
- Peak: Sgùrr Mòr
- Elevation: 1,110 m (3,640 ft)

Naming
- Native name: Frìth Fanaich (Scottish Gaelic)

Geography
- Country: United Kingdom
- Country: Scotland
- Council area: Highland
- Range coordinates: 57°42′N 5°01′W

The Fannichs are a range of mountains located in Highland, Scotland. It lies between Loch Fannich in the southeast and Loch Broom in the northwest. According to Edward Dwelly, the word "fannich" means "flat place".

It is well known for its high mountains, including nine Munros:

- Sgùrr Mòr – 1,110 m
- Sgùrr nan Clach Geala – 1,093 m
- Sgurr Breac – 999 m
- A' Chailleach – 997 m
- Beinn Liath Mhòr Fanaich – 954 m
- Meall Gorm – 949 m
- Meall a' Chrasgaidh – 934 m
- Sgùrr nan Each – 923 m
- An Coileachan – 923 m

The Fannichs are also a Special Area of Conservation.
