= Indian Institute of Public Administration =

Research and training organization

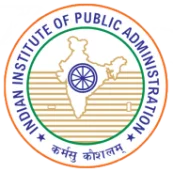
- Motto: कर्मसु कौशलम
- Type: Training Institute
- Established: 1954
- Chairman: Jitendra Singh
- President: Vice President of India
- Location: Indraprastha Estate, Mahatma Gandhi Marg, New Delhi, Delhi, India
- Campus: Urban
- Website: Indian Institute of Public Administration

The Indian Institute of Public Administration was established in 1954 and is a research and training organization under the Ministry of Personnel of the Government of India. It is engaged in training and research in Public Administration and Governance in India. The institute hosts regular training programs for various Civil Servants, Learned Judicial Officers, Public Administrators among others. The present Director-General of the institute is Dr Surendrakumar Bagde, IAS.

== Research ==
Indian Journal of Public Administration, in collaboration with the Sage Publishing and Indian Institute of Public Administration, offers scholarly insights into public administration practices and policies in India.
