= Gaor Bheinn =

Mountain in Scotland

Coordinates: 56.93553°N 5.28558°W

- Gadhail Bheinn
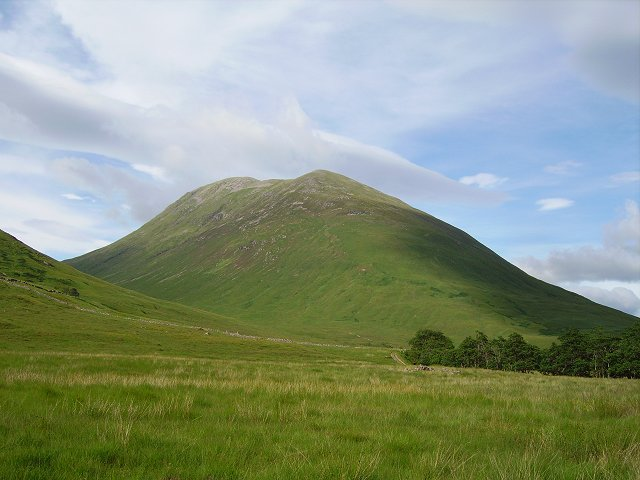

Highest point
- Elevation: 987 m (3,238 ft)
- Prominence: 842 m (2,762 ft)Ranked 23rd in British Isles
- Parent peak: Carn Eige
- Listing: Munro, Marilyn

Naming
- Language of name: Gaelic
- Pronunciation: Scottish Gaelic: [ˈkɯːɾveɲ]

Geography
- Location: Highland, Scotland
- OS grid: NN002875

Gaor Bheinn, also known in English as Gulvain (Scottish Gaelic: Gadhail Bheinn), is a mountain in the Northwest Highlands of Scotland. It is in Lochaber, south of Loch Arkaig and north of the road west of Fort William (from which it is usually climbed). It is composed of banded granite and shaped like a letter Y, with two tops connected by a ridge running from northeast to southwest, with the northern top 6 m higher than the one to the south. Crags drop at either end, and steep slopes fall away to either side. The south ridge path is really a stream bed, so in wet conditions an easier if longer ascent from Na Socachan is to walk up Allt a Choire Reidh towards Gualann nan Osna and climb the south top's north-west ridge.

According to Ainmean-Àite na h-Alba, the name comes from Gadhail Bheinn, meaning "mountain of the hunting dogs" (gadhar). It has also been suggested the name comes from Gaothail Bheinn or Gaothar Bheinn, "windy mountain".
