= Beinn Bhàn (Applecross) =

896m high mountain in Scotland

Coordinates: 57.44204°N 5.66102°W

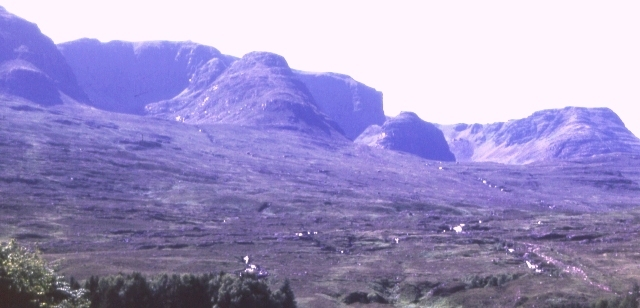
- The corries on the eastern side of Beinn Bhàn

Highest point
- Elevation: 896 m (2,940 ft)
- Prominence: 851 m (2,792 ft); Ranked 20th in British Isles
- Parent peak: Sgurr Mor
- Listing: Marilyn, Corbett

Naming
- English translation: white mountain
- Language of name: Gaelic
- Pronunciation: /ˈbeɪn ˈvæn/

Geography
- Location within Scotland
- Location: Highland, Scotland
- Parent range: Applecross peninsula
- OS grid: NG804450
- Topo map: OS Landranger 24

Beinn Bhàn is a mountain in the highlands of Scotland, lying on the Applecross peninsula, on the north side of Loch Kishorn.

Located on the eastern side of Beinn Bhàn are several rocky corries, which can be seen from the A896 road. Coire na Poite, which forms a bowl shape, almost entirely ringed by crags offering climbing and winter ice climbing routes.
