= Sgùrr Mòr (Fannichs) =

Mountain in Northern Scotland

Coordinates: 57.700744°N 5.015067°W

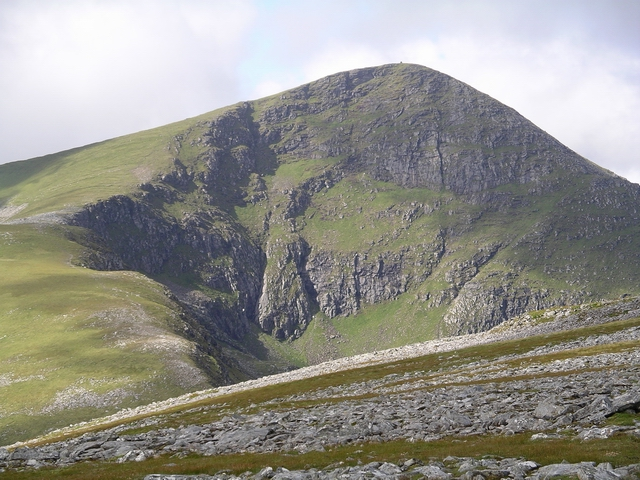

Highest point
- Elevation: 1,109 m (3,638 ft)
- Prominence: 914 m Ranked 12th in British Isles
- Parent peak: Carn Eige
- Listing: Marilyn, Munro

Naming
- English translation: Great Peak
- Language of name: Gaelic
- Pronunciation: Scottish Gaelic: [ˈs̪kuːrˠ ˈmoːɾ]

Geography
- Location: Highland, Scotland
- Parent range: Fannichs
- OS grid: NH203718
- Topo map: OS Landranger 20

Climbing
- Easiest route: Hike

Sgùrr Mòr is the highest of the nine Munros in the mountain range known as the Fannichs in northern Scotland. This range is located between Loch Fannich and the A835 Ullapool road — a remote area with few habitations, but these Munros, which are usually climbed in groups or occasionally in a single hike, are mostly gentle sloped and fairly accessible from either of these locations. If approached from Loch Fannich, a bicycle or permission to drive on the private road would be helpful.

== See also ==
- Ben Nevis
- List of Munro mountains
- Mountains and hills of Scotland
