= Dark Justice (book) =

2005 book

Dark Justice: Inside the World of Paedophile Hunters
- Author: Mark de Rond
- Language: English
- Publisher: Cambridge University Press
- Publication date: 2025
- Publication place: United Kingdom
- Pages: 208
- ISBN: 978-1009457040

Dark Justice: Inside the World of Paedophile Hunters is an ethnographic book by Mark de Rond. It is centered around the operations of British anti-pedophile vigilante group COBRA.

In the book, de Rond describes his four-year experience of accompanying the sting operations of the vigilante group. He also writes in the book about accounts from people related to the group's targets, who said they had felt terrified by seeing strangers knocking on their doors and demanding that a member of their family come with them while filming the interaction. In one of the amateur sting operations followed by de Rond, an elderly man died by suicide after being accused by the group.
