= Harris Superquarry =

Proposed super quarry in Scotland

Coordinates: 57.760°N 6.933°W

The Harris Super Quarry was a super quarry at Lingerbay, Harris, Scotland proposed by Redland Aggregates in 1991. The plan was to surface mine aggregate.
