= Roineabhal =

Coordinates: 57°46′00″N 6°58′31″W

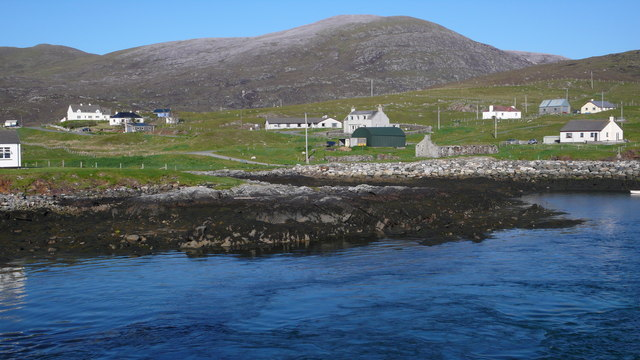
- Roineabhal with Leverburgh in the foreground

Highest point
- Elevation: 460 m (1,510 ft)
- Prominence: 406 m (1,332 ft)
- Parent peak: Beinn Dhubh
- Listing: Marilyn

Geography
- Location: Harris, Outer Hebrides, Scotland
- OS grid: NG042860
- Topo map: OS Landranger 18

Roineabhal is a hill in Harris, in the Western Isles of Scotland. The granite on the summit plateau of the mountain is anorthosite, and is similar in composition to rocks found in the mountains of the Moon.

The area is part of the South Lewis, Harris and North Uist National Scenic Area.

It is the site of the original Lingerbay 'superquarry' planning application, submitted in 1991 and finally withdrawn in 2004.
