= Ardhasaig =

Coordinates: 57.921°N 6.849°W

Ardhasaig: Scottish Gaelic: Àird Àsaig
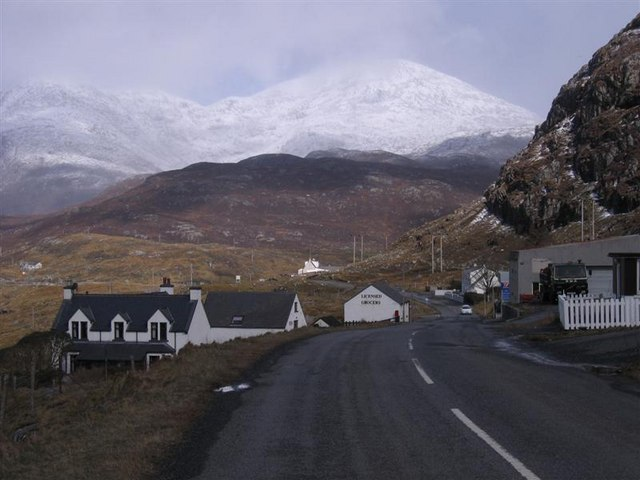
- The snow-covered Clisham, seen from Ardhasaig

- Location within the Outer Hebrides
- Language: Scottish Gaelic; English
- OS grid reference: NB130027
- Civil parish: Harris
- Council area: Na h-Eileanan Siar
- Lieutenancy area: Western Isles
- Country: Scotland
- Sovereign state: United Kingdom
- Post town: ISLE OF HARRIS
- Postcode district: HS3
- Dialling code: 01859
- Police: Scotland
- Fire: Scottish
- Ambulance: Scottish
- UK Parliament: Na h-Eileanan an Iar
- Scottish Parliament: Na h-Eileanan an Iar

Ardhasaig (Scottish Gaelic: Àird Àsaig) is a settlement on the western coast of north Harris, in the Outer Hebrides, Scotland. Ardhasaig is also within the parish of Harris, and is situated on the A859 which links Harris with Stornoway. The settlement lies near to the junction of the B887 with the A859. Ardhasaig has a petrol station, shop, and hotel.

== Notable people ==
- Dòmhnall Iain MacLeòid (born 1943) - writer and journalist
