= List of records of the United Kingdom =

List of records of United Kingdom is an annotated list of British records organised by category.

== Geography ==
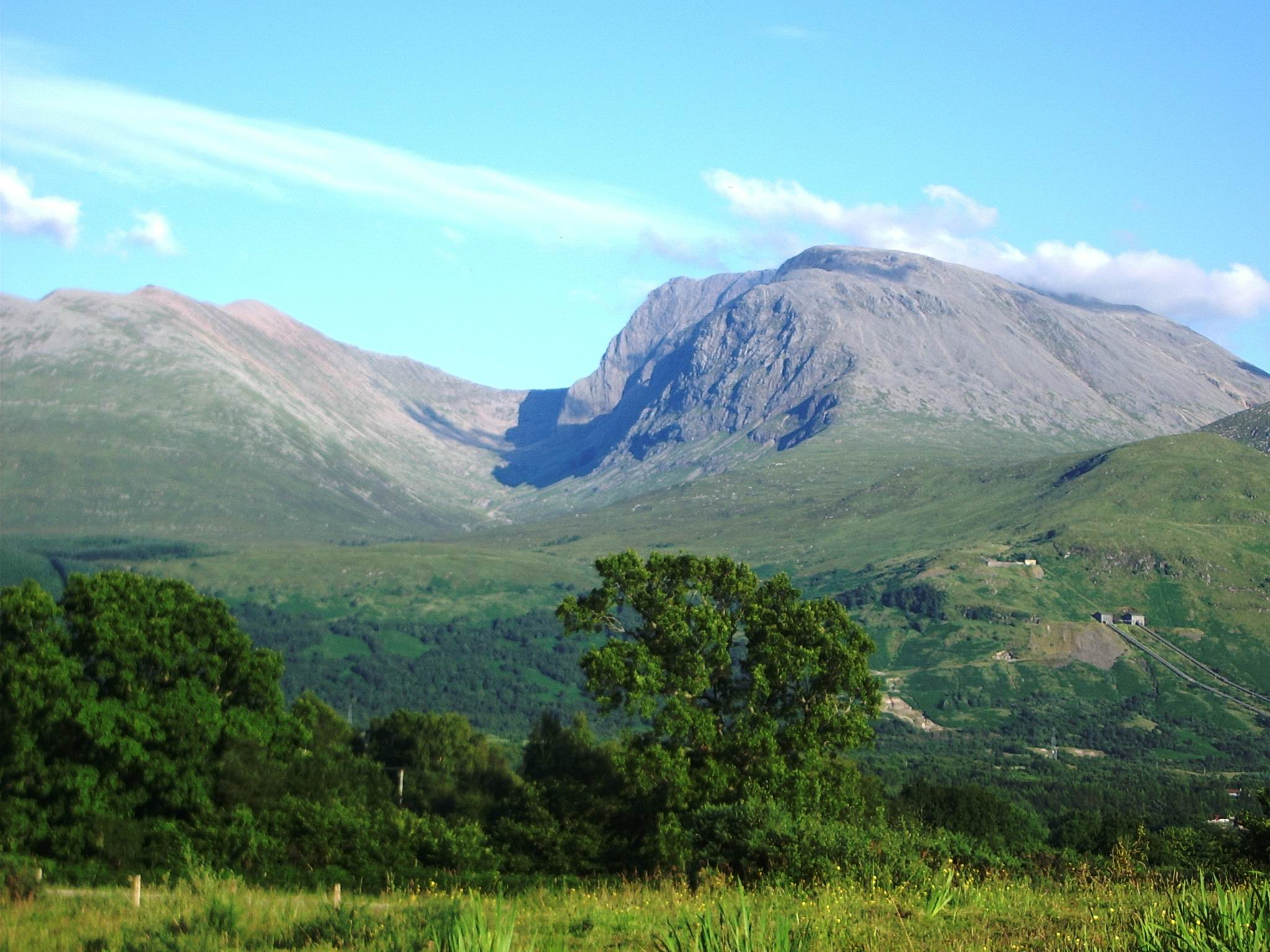
Ben Nevis, the tallest mountain in the United Kingdom.

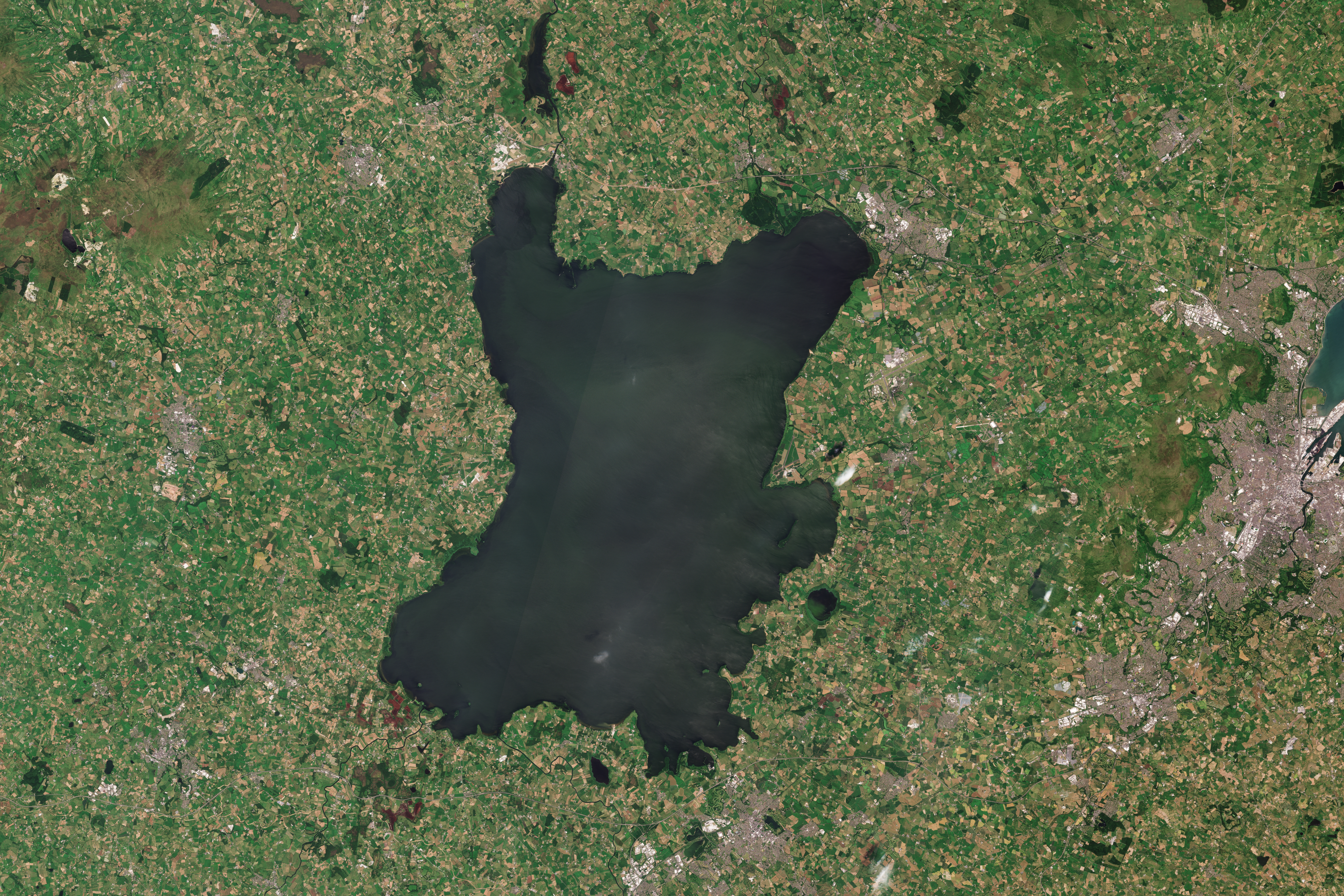
Lough Neagh, the largest body of water in the United Kingdom.

- Tallest mountain: Ben Nevis, 1,345 metres (4,413 ft).
- Largest body of water: Lough Neagh, 1,760 sq mi (4,550 km^{2}).
- Longest river: River Severn, 354 km (220 mi).
- Largest island: Great Britain, 209,331 km^{2}(80,823 sq mi).
  - Largest uninhabited island: Taransay, 1,475 ha (5 3/4 sq mi).

== Buildings ==
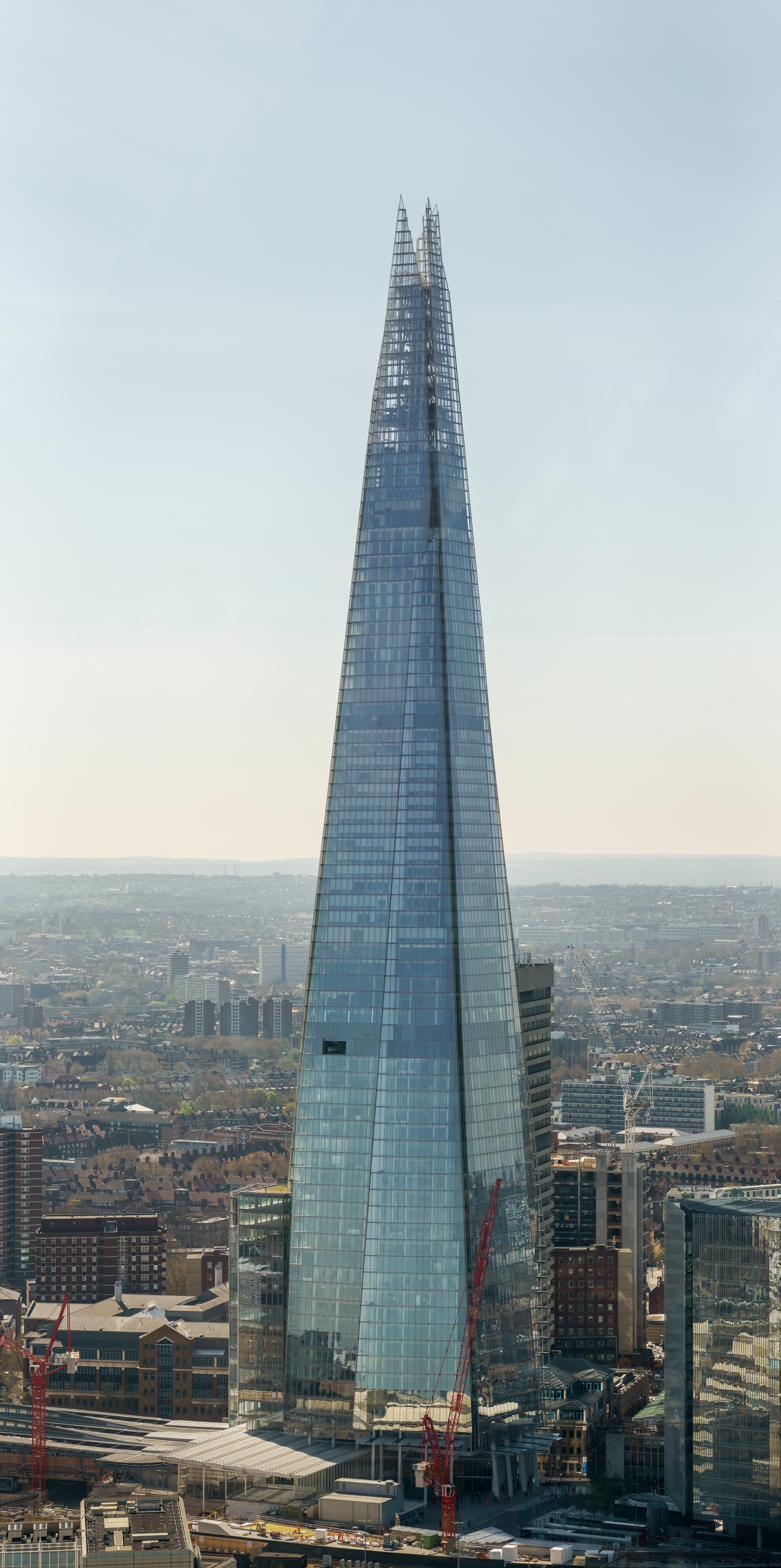
The Shard, the tallest building in the United Kingdom.

- Tallest building: The Shard, 309.6 m (1,016 ft).

== Sports ==
=== Olympics ===
- Most medals won by Great Britain in a single Summer Olympics game: 1908 Summer Olympics, 146 medals (56 gold, 51 silver, 39 bronze).
- Most Olympic medals won by a British Olympian: Jason Kenny, 9 medals (7 gold, 2 silver, 0 bronze).

== Leaders ==
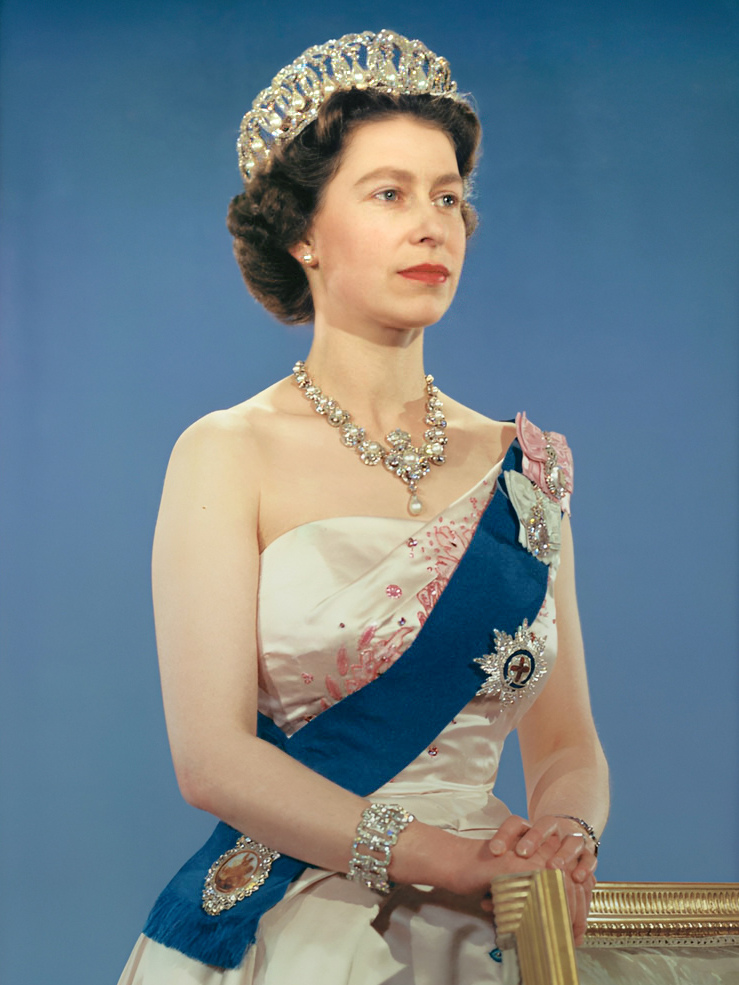
Elizabeth II, the longest-reigning British monarch.

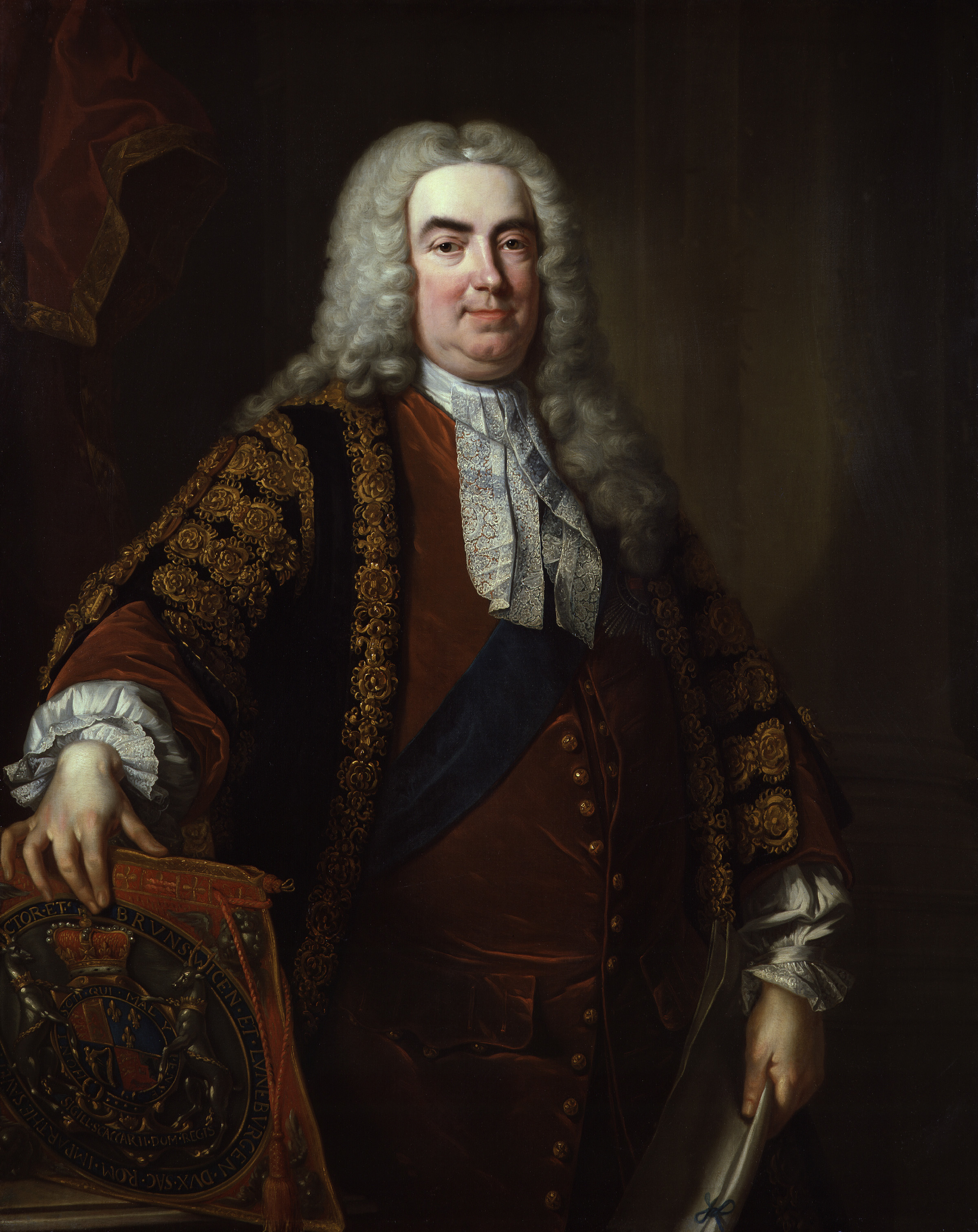
Robert Walpole, the longest-serving British prime minister.

=== Monarchs ===
- Longest-reigning monarch: Elizabeth II, 70 years, 214 days.
  - Longest-reigning king: George III, 59 years, 96 days.
- Shortest-reigning monarch: Edward VIII, 10 months, 22 days.

=== Prime ministers ===
- Longest-serving prime minister: Robert Walpole, 20 years, 315 days.
- Shortest-serving prime minister: Liz Truss, 1 month, 19 days.

== See also ==
- Extreme points of the United Kingdom
- List of tallest buildings in the United Kingdom
- List of tallest structures in the United Kingdom
