= Dòmhnall Iain MacLeòid =

Dòmhnall Iain MacLeòid (born 1943) is a writer, editor, and journalist in Scottish Gaelic. He was born in Ardhasaig in Harris. He obtained a PhD from the University of Glasgow in 1969; his thesis was entitled Twentieth Century Gaelic literature: a description, comprising critical study and a comprehensive bibliography. He was the co-editor of the quarterly Scottish Gaelic magazine Gairm with Ruaraidh MacThòmais. He was a lecturer in the Celtic Department, University of Glasgow.

== Publications ==
- Dorcha tro Ghlainne: taghadh de sgeulachdan-goirid (Gairm, Glaschu, 1970), ed.
- Dualchas an Aghaidh nan Creag: The Gaelic Revival 1890-2020 (Clò-beag, Inbhir Nis, 2011)
