= Castaway 2000 =

Reality television programme

- Genre: Reality television
- Developed by: Lion Television
- Presented by: Julia Bradbury (later episodes)
- Starring: The Castaways
- Narrated by: Robert Lindsay
- Country of origin: United Kingdom
- Original language: English
- No. of series: 1 (broadcast in parts)
- No. of episodes: 32 (inc. specials)

Production
- Executive producers: Jeremy Mills (as Jerry Mills); Colin Cameron
- Producer: Chris Kelly
- Production locations: Taransay, Outer Hebrides, Scotland
- Running time: 10–60 minutes
- Production companies: Lion Television and BBC Scotland (2000–01); BBC Bristol (2008)

Original release
- Network: BBC One
- Release: 18 January 2000 – 21 January 2001
- Network: BBC Two
- Release: 28 July – 1 August 2008

Related
- L&K Castaway (junior series); Castaway 2007 (revived series); Eden (2016)

Castaway 2000 is a reality television programme broadcast on BBC One throughout 2000. The programme followed a group of thirty-six men, women, and children who were tasked with building a community on the Scottish island of Taransay, 1 7/8 miles (3 kilometres) off the west coast of Harris, Outer Hebrides.

Described as a pioneering early form of the new genre of reality television, while a ratings success it nonetheless featured a number of issues during filming, leading to bad publicity and even a legal dispute. It launched the television career of participant Ben Fogle but, according to the Radio Times, the show is probably "remembered for little else."

Seven years later the BBC resurrected the show for Castaway 2007. In 2016 Channel 4 began airing a similar show, Eden, which drew many comparisons to and lessons from Castaway.

== Development ==
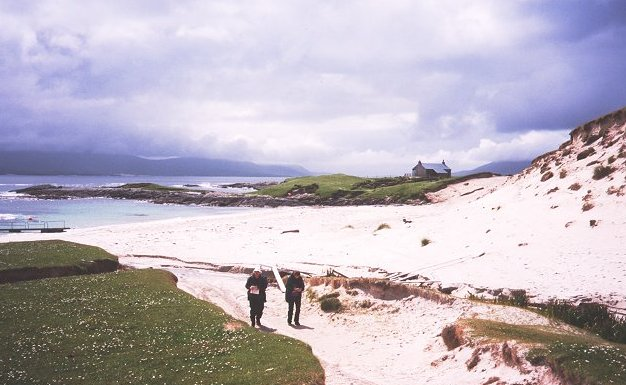
The beach at Paible, Taransay.

The show followed a year-long effort by thirty-six men, women and children from the British public to build a community on Taransay, a Scottish island in the Outer Hebrides.

In what was billed as a bold experiment for the new millennium, the castaways were to build a sustainable self-sufficient community from scratch (apart from some buildings which were already there, and some which had been placed there for them). They were to grow their own vegetables, kill their own animals and become a community for the year.

The series differed from some reality shows in several essentials. First, there was no supporting crew. The castaways filmed themselves. Second, there is no competition. Castaway 2000 had no prize on offer at the end of the year-long experience, in comparison with Channel 4's Big Brother, which came along later in the year. The goal was to build a community rather than select a "winner". In this it is as much a documentary of a yearlong experiment in community building as it is a reality television show.

The series producer was Chris Kelly for Lion Television, executive produced by Jeremy Mills for Lion and Colin Cameron for BBC Scotland.

=== Castaways ===
Candidates for the programme were selected and trained by survival expert John "Lofty" Wiseman to represent a cross-section of British society.

- Ray Bowyer
- Gordon and the Carey family
- Liz Cathrine and Dez Monks
- Tanya Cheadle
- Sandy Colbeck
- Monica Cooney (with child)
- Ron Copsey
- Julia, Colin and Natasha Corrigan
- Hilary Freeman
- Ben Fogle
- Tammy Huff
- Peter and Sheila Jowers
- Trevor Kearon
- Mike Laird
- Warren Latore
- Julie Lowe
- Gwyneth and Patrick Murphy
- Padraig Nallen
- Philiy Page
- Trish Prater (with children)
- Roger and Rosemary Stephenson (with children)
- Toby Waterman
- James Roberts

== Production ==
Location of Taransay in Scotland

The Castaways were allowed to bring a certain number of personal possessions with them, but some of these were dropped during an airlift and possessions were either lost or damaged. Julie Lowe was one of four Castaways who lost personal possessions they had chosen for the year when a container carrying supplies fell into the sea during an airlift. There was an outbreak of flu early in the year and soon afterwards they were offered antibiotics because of a nearby outbreak of meningitis.

The castaways, including eight children, reared their own cattle, sheep, pigs, and chickens, and built an environmentally sound infrastructure including a wind turbine, hydro-electric dam, waterless urinals and long drops. Living in turf-covered eco pods, the castaways built a school and a slaughterhouse and erected polytunnels to grow produce. With such a large number of participants from many varying ways of life, there were many arguments on the island. One notable clash was between a family of devout Seventh-day Adventists and a gay man.

Tanya Cheadle, a 26-year-old television producer, did much of the filming for the show – it was believed that having too many camera operators would undermine any sense of isolation. Smaller cameras were later provided to castaways, and a fixed camera was installed in a "diary room". Every two weeks, producers would visit to collect the footage. At the end of the year some episodes were transmitted live and the castaways were joined by presenter Julia Bradbury.

=== Problems ===
In 2016, the Radio Times identified several errors in the execution of the Castaway programme that the makers of the forthcoming similar show Eden should avoid, namely:

- Cast – it argued that 36 cast members was too large, preventing the emergence of noteworthy participants for viewers
- Filming – it was believed that having too few cameras meant too many crucial moments were missed
- Press attention – prior to broadcast, journalists managed to learn of issues such as the flu outbreak, resulting in negative press and an attempted incursion by boat
- Visitors – With the mainland visible from Taransay, and an established community on nearby Harris, it proved impossible to prevent the frequent intermingling of castaways with locals, who allegedly even attended parties and exchanged goods. The bothy on the island had also regularly been visited by passing sailors and tourists attracted by the natural beauty prior to the show, and producers were ultimately unable to stop this from continuing during the show - allegedly concealing from viewers the fact that hundreds of visitors had signed its visitor book by the end of the year.
- Departures – some castaways were permitted to leave temporarily for funerals etc., while others successfully left the island for good – one attempted escape "became the subject of a massive press circus – including a speedboat chase – subjecting the show to ridicule". Ray Bowyer, Ron Copsey, Hilary Freeman and the Carey family left the island early. After leaving, Ron Copsey was reported to have complained about the programme's producers. One of the programmes shows Ben Fogle threatening to leave though about halfway through the year a visit from the castaways' friends and family was organised.
- Information – contrary to the rules, castaways smuggled mobile phones onto the island, and a communal radio was set up in the community kitchen. Castaways allowed to leave temporarily also brought back information from the outside world.
- Conditions – the decision to expose castaways to foul weather in a bleak landscape was deemed to have produced a "grim" experience for viewers of the resulting footage
- Building – the building of the eco pods was allegedly not begun on time, leading to delays and problems with contractors
- Non-cooperation – in addition to those who departed in protest at the conditions, some of the other castaways decided not to cooperate and instead revolt against producers, declaring themselves the Taransay Five and erecting a self-designed flag from their pod, and deciding not to take part in filming. This led to a deep division in the community by the end of the experiment, between those who did and did not cooperate.

Castaway Ron Copsey later indicated that he felt the production company had gone too far in their attempts to create drama for the show, including manufacturing a storyline that indicated there was conflict between himself and other castaways, but using footage that was from a conflict between him and producers. Copsey sued the BBC and Lion TV for libel, and was awarded £16,000 as restitution.

== Broadcast ==
Castaway 2000 was broadcast throughout the year on BBC One. The first run of four episodes proved a ratings hit, attracting audiences of 7–8 million viewers in January of that year. Four more "updates" were broadcast around Easter, in April 2000 with 6.5–7.5 million viewers. 5.4–6.4 million tuned in for a third series of updates that were aired in September, with the final series of episodes in December 2000 and January 2001. These included a series of live, 10-minute broadcasts from Taransay presented by Julia Bradbury that were broadcast daily in the last week of 2000.

The final instalment of Castaway 2000 was broadcast on 17 January 2001 as Castaway 2000: the Good, the Bad and the Ugly and was watched by 4.9 million viewers. Three documentaries were also broadcast, including the final episode.

=== Transmissions ===
==== Series ====
| Series | Start date | End date | Episodes |
|---|---|---|---|
| 1 | 18 January 2000 | 26 January 2000 | 4 |
| 2 | 23 April 2000 | 27 April 2000 | 4 |
| 3 | 12 September 2000 | 21 September 2000 | 4 |
| Diaries | 24 November 2000 | 15 December 2000 | 4 |
| 5 | 27 December 2000 | 1 January 2001 | 9 |
| Return | 28 July 2008 | 1 August 2008 | 5 |

==== Specials ====
| Date | Entitle |
|---|---|
| 18 December 2000 | Castaway 2000: Heaven and Hell |
| 19 December 2000 | Castaway 2000: Changed Lives |
| 24 December 2000 | Castaway Christmas Diary |
| 27 December 2000 | Castaways Kids |
| 7 January 2001 | Castaways Return (part 1) |
| 14 January 2001 | Castaways Return (part 2) |
| 17 January 2001 | Castaway 2000: the Good, the Bad and the Ugly |
| 21 January 2001 | Castaways in Hollywood |

== Reception ==
According to the Radio Times looking back 15 years later, the show's "integrity as a pioneering format was diluted by what some participants have since argued was the production’s obsession with conflict, as well as regular interference and assistance from the outside world."

== Awards and nominations ==
| Year | Group | Award | Result | Ref(s) |
|---|---|---|---|---|
| 2001 | Indies | Factual Award | Won | |
| 2001 | TRIC Awards | Documentary Programme of the Year | Won | |
| 2001 | British Academy Television Awards | Best Factual Series or Strand | Nominated | |
| 2001 | British Academy Television Awards | Innovation Award | Nominated | |

== Legacy ==
For most castaways, life returned to normal after the project closed on 1 January 2001. Only Ben Fogle, who was heavily featured in the shows and comes from a media family, has continued to work in TV, appearing as a regular on The Holiday Show and Countryfile amongst others. The Stephenson family were inspired to try home education for their children.

An official hardcover book about the project, written by author Mark McCrum, was published in November 2000 by Ebury Publishing and in updated paperback version in April 2001. Castaway charted in the top ten UK non-fiction bestseller list.

Despite initial talks of a second shorter series, it did not return until 2007; however it was the inspiration for a children's spin-off series created by Live & Kicking that was broadcast on CBBC in the summer of 2001. Since the original show's ending, Taransay has been opened up to tourists. Castaway Tanya Cheadle married Paul Overton, an assistant producer on the series, on the island in 2004. The wedding was attended by ten other castaways including Fogle.

In 2008, BBC Two broadcast a new 5-part series titled Return to... Castaway. The show featured interviews with stars of the original series and behind the scenes recollections from cast members, as well as original series highlights.
