= Anton Wright =

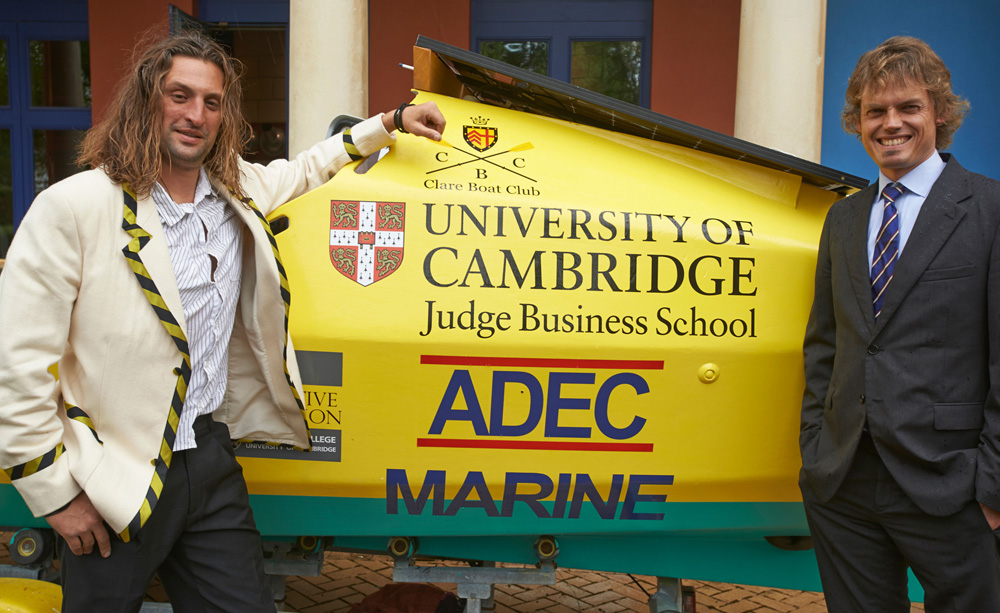
- Anton Wright and Mark de Rond with Amazon expedition boat
- Born: 1974 (age 51–52)
- Occupations: Adventurer, rowing coach, and television personality
- Website: www.antonwright.com

Anton Wright is an adventurer, rowing coach, and—alongside Mark de Rond—holder of the Guinness World Record for the first unsupported row of the navigable length of the Amazon River.

== Career ==
=== Clare College, Cambridge ===
Anton Wright was the head coach and boathouse manager at Clare College, Cambridge, from 2010 to 2017.

=== 'Row the Amazon': The first unsupported row of the Amazon River ===
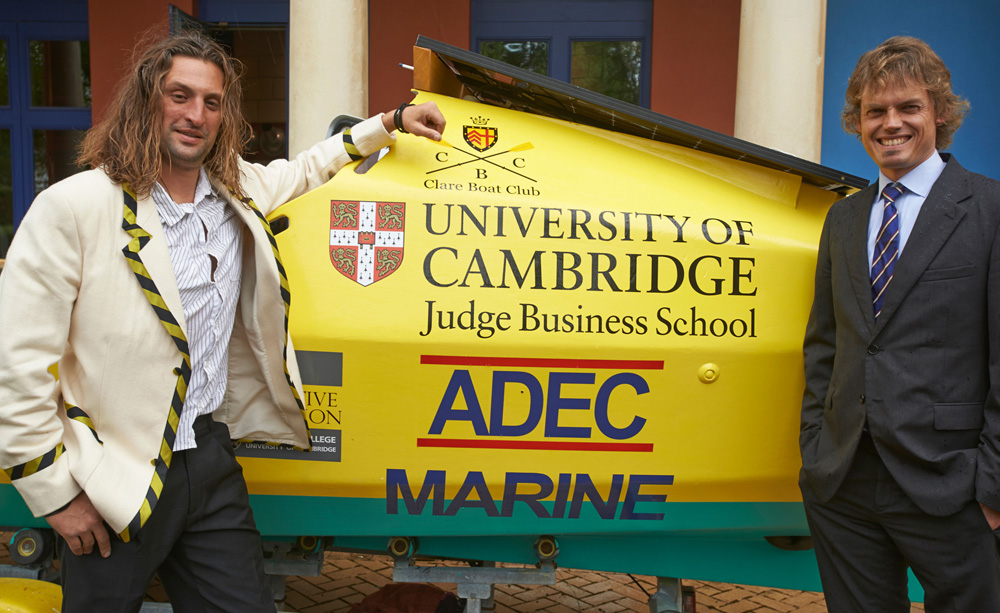
The 'Row the Amazon' expedition boat with crew, Anton Wright and Mark de Rond

In September 2013, Anton Wright and Mark de Rond began their attempt to be the first people to row the entire length of the Amazon River unsupported. Having started in Nautu, Peru on 1 September 2013, they reached the Brazilian coastal town of Macapa six weeks later. In an article about the expedition, Reuters explained the rowers "will brave piranhas, bandits and disease in an attempt to be the first crew to row the length of the Amazon river." and described how "...they will sleep in turns at night to keep watch for runaway logs in the water which could destroy their boat, anacondas, bull sharks, thieves, illegal logging and mining operators trying to keep their locations secret and drug traffickers in Brazil's vast rain-forest."

An official Guinness World Record certificate was presented to Anton and Mark at the British Consulate in São Paulo on 15 October 2013.

The expedition raised money in aid of Leonard Cheshire Disability.

=== 'Row the Thames': The Parkside Challenge ===
Following the Amazon row, Anton returned to Cambridge and in 2015 the Row the Amazon boat was subsequently repaired by six boys from Parkside Community College in Cambridge, during a 14-week adventure experience intended to develop pride and life skills in local school children, which concluded in a largely unsupported row of a 176-mile stretch of the River Thames.

=== Television ===
==== Eden ====
In 2016, Anton participated in the experimental British reality TV show Eden. He was described by the Guardian as "Eden's stand-out character" looking for 'a shot at reinvention'.
