= Lingarabay =

Coordinates: 57°45′37″N 6°55′55″W

Lingarabay (also Lingerabay or Lingerbay; Scottish Gaelic: Lingreabhagh) is a small coastal settlement on Harris, in the Outer Hebrides of Scotland. It is located on the rocky east coast of South Harris, about 2 miles (3.2 km) northeast of Rodel.

It was the subject of one of the area's longest controversies (see Harris Super Quarry). The original 'superquarry' planning application, submitted in 1991, was to extract 600 million tonnes of anorthosite rock over a period of 60 years, from Roineabhal, an isolated area of South Harris in the Western Isles.

The proposal prompted numerous objections and led to the formation of a body called the Link Quarry Group (LQG). The Quarry Group was concerned about the quarry's location in a designated National Scenic Area, questions over the sustainability of extracting vast quantities of rock for use in motorway construction, the potential for marine pollution from the increased shipping traffic and impacts on the biodiversity of the area including a pair of golden eagles.

Due to the concerns raised the Scottish Executive held a Public Local Inquiry in Stornoway, which ran over 9 months from October 1994 until June 1995. It was then a further four years before the recommendations from the inquiry were completed and submitted to the Scottish Executive. Finally, in November 2000 Sam Galbraith as Minister for Environment, Sport and Culture (including responsibility for Planning) turned down the application.

In 2001, a second inquiry was held into the legal validity of a consent apparently granted in 1965. Scottish Ministers decide that a consent was granted for a small quarry rather than the large area claimed by the applicants. The applicants lodged an appeal with the Court of Session, arguing that no redetermination of the 1991 application should take place until this appeal was decided. In January 2004 the decision by Scottish Ministers, that the 1965 consent relates to a small area of quarrying activity was upheld.

In April 2004 Lafarge decided to withdraw their 1991 application and announced their intention to drop their proposals for the site.

As in several other environmental controversies in Scotland, the Ròineabhal question was argued on both sides by parties not resident in the country.
