= Eden (2016 TV series) =

Coordinates: 56.748556°N 5.888552°W

- Also known as: Eden: Paradise Lost
- Genre: Reality
- Narrated by: Paul McGann
- Country of origin: United Kingdom
- Original language: English
- No. of seasons: 2
- No. of episodes: 9

Production
- Executive producers: Andrew Palmer; Coleen Flynn
- Producer: Liz Foley
- Production locations: Cul na Croise Bay, Ardnamurchan, Lochaber, Scotland
- Running time: 60–80 minutes
- Production company: KEO Films

Original release
- Network: Channel 4
- Release: 18 July 2016 – 11 August 2017

Related
- Castaway 2000

Eden is a British reality television series; the first series was broadcast on Channel 4 from 18 July to 8 August 2016. It featured 23 participants living for a year in a remote part of Scotland, attempting to build a self-sufficient community. Filmed by the participants themselves, production began in March 2016. Unknown to the participants, broadcasting ceased after four episodes due to poor viewer ratings. However, the final five episodes were broadcast in August 2017 as Eden: Paradise Lost.

== Synopsis ==
The aim of the show was to act as a social experiment, to ascertain if the participants could build a self-sufficient community away from the technology and hectic pace of modern life. Producers hoped that the participants would not merely survive, but thrive, and that the footage would tell both their human stories as well as relate the practicalities involved.

The participants were given no other goal or task than the broad aim of building a community, being allowed to decide for themselves how to feed, shelter and organise themselves. Participants were solicited with an online advert that asked, "Are you tired of modern life? Would you like to start all over again?" Participants had the choice to leave the show at any time, subject to following a specified protocol.

== Production ==
Location of "Eden" in Scotland

Channel 4 first proposed the project to the owner of the estate in December 2015. The series was produced by KEO Films. Series producer is Liz Foley. The show's executive producers are Andrew Palmer and Coleen Flynn.

=== Genesis ===
A reality TV based social experiment based around community building had previously been pioneered by the BBC, who broadcast Castaway 2000 (from 1 January 2000 to 1 January 2001), following the efforts of thirty-six men, women, and children on a remote Scottish island. According to the Radio Times however, Castaway's "integrity as a pioneering format" was compromised by "regular interference and assistance from the outside world" and the production team's alleged focus on conflict. Since Castaway, the idea for a truly unmediated show had been discussed by broadcasters, but it was not until three things came into alignment before the idea was taken from the idea stage to execution - the use of fixed rig filming technology as pioneered by One Born Every Minute, the change in appetite for a return to social experiment style reality TV (citing the evolution of Big Brother into a "hysterical grotfest"), and the "growth of disenfranchisement and interest in self-sufficient living" following the late 2000s recession. It has been argued that the timing of the show coming so soon after the "start again" mood after Brexit referendum was either genius planning or extremely lucky timing.

Previewing the show, the Radio Times identified several failings of the Castaway production that Eden should avoid by getting the right number of interesting participants, ensuring every moment is filmed, maintaining the isolation of the participants—preventing visitors and journalists from gaining access, and stopping participants smuggling in radios, mobile phones, etc.—prevent participants leaving (including temporarily, for funerals etc.), don't make the experience too "grim" for participants or viewers, set up accommodation in advance, and prevent the non-cooperation of participants (i.e. those who choose to stay but try not to be filmed). It was believed by the previewer that the enhanced filming set up would ensure no moment was missed and tight security would prevent incursion. They were unsure whether the reduced number of participants would be small enough to solve the casting issues.

=== Filming ===
Filming began in March 2016, to last for one year. Footage for the show was obtained in three ways: from a network of fixed rig cameras, from four embedded camera operators, and GoPro personal cameras. Four of the participants, Ben, Jane, Matt and Oli, were the designated embedded camera operators and were expected to film proceedings in addition to being fully functioning members of the community. All other participants were issued with their own personal Go Pro cameras, to supplement filming. The fixed camera setup comprised a large network of remotely operated CCTV cameras, the rig for which had to be transported onto the site by helicopter. There were a total of 45 cameras.

Mixed in with the filming shown during episodes was a small amount of footage of participants filmed individually in pieces to camera before it began, where they give some information about their motivations and beliefs.

=== Isolation ===
The participants were isolated from the outside world, and were not going to be told of any news or current events that take place during the experiment. Despite this, several instances of contact with the outside world took place. In the second episode, two fishermen were observed visiting the beach, later returning with a package containing food and drink for the participants. According to the Radio Times, after the experiment had begun but before its first broadcast, journalists had been allowed access to the participants camp in a "tightly controlled set visit", observing evidence of their early achievements.

=== Supplies ===
The participants were allowed to specify in advance what supplies, tools and equipment they thought they would need, which was left in place for them on site. Each was also permitted to carry into the site some personal belongings, in a large rucksack.

These initial supplies included livestock (chickens, sheep and goats) and seeds and vegetables, and basic building materials such as tarpaulin and pipes. The participants were supplied with a basic set of food rations, with the expectation that within a short period they would become self-sufficient in terms of food supply, living on the produce of a vegetable garden and the milk, eggs and meat from the livestock. At the start of filming, most of the livestock was either pregnant or too young to be slaughtered.

=== Observations ===
According to show producers, three months into the experiment the participants were getting along well, the atmosphere being described as "not totally harmonious, but it’s not explosive in a negative sense." Gabriel Tate of the Radio Times said in July 2016 that they were achieving impressive results as they worked together to overcome challenges.

== Filming location ==
The location of experiment is the remote peninsula of Ardnamurchan in Inverness-shire, on the west coast of Scotland. The peninsula itself is 50 square miles (130 km^{2}), of which the Eden site covers 600 acres (240 hectares). The nearest village, Acharacle, is five miles (8.0 km) to the south east on the shore of Loch Shiel, a popular destination for hikers and naturalists.

The Eden site is located on the private uninhabited Ardnamurchan Estate, formerly used by No. 10 (Inter-Allied) Commando as a training area during World War II. It is bordered on one side by Cu na Croise Bay, looking out onto the Atlantic Ocean. The other three sides have been enclosed with a six-foot-high fence. The nature of the site ranges from dunes to woodland to marsh.

The Eden site is roughly triangular, with a coastline on the NW and NE side, and the rest of the peninsula to the south. Covered mostly in forest, there is a beach on the NW coast, and between the beach and the forest lies a strip of dunes. The site only included two pre-existing structures, located together between the dunes and the forest: a corrugated iron tool shed, and an unenclosed hay barn. This became the location group's first camp site, being known as the Summer site. Another site, becoming known as the Winter Camp, was then established on the north east side, inside the forest but near the coast.

The estate is owned by Donald Houston, who says it has been uninhabited since the Bronze Age, and describes it as a challenging environment, with the prevailing wet and windy conditions and "not very fertile" ground posing a challenge to building shelter and growing crops, although the site does have some more sheltered areas. Initially depicted as wet and windy, by episode two the site had also been covered in snow, but by episode three, which began six weeks into the experiment, it was at times sunny enough for the group to wear beach clothing.

To ensure no members of the public enter the site during filming, the production company was granted a temporary suspension of the public right of access by Highland Council and Scottish Ministers. The application was controversial, with objectors expressing fears for the environment, and supporters viewing it as a potential boost for the local economy.

== Participants ==
During casting, it was reported there would be 24 participants but a total of 23 participants began the experiment, comprising 13 men and 10 women. Several have partners who they will be away from for the duration of the experiment. Once filming had begun, the identities of participants were initially withheld by Channel 4 until they had decided when the series would be broadcast.

Participants were selected to provide a broad cross section of skills deemed to be needed in the community.

On the day of the first broadcast, the Radio Times identified six participants as "ones to watch": Jack, Katie, Lloyd, Jane, Jasmine and Raphael.

Name	Occupation/skill	Age in 2016	
Andrew (Titch)	Plumber - Shopfitter	34	
Anton Wright	Adventurer and rowing coach	41	Voted Out 9 : 3 The 2 subjects were not asked to vote (#10/11)
Ali	Junior doctor	24	Left - (#7)
Ben Johnston	Crew	37	Left - (#2)
Caroline	Dog groomer and shepherdess	27	Left - Not mentioned in-show S02E04 onwards. (#12)
Glenn Moore	IT consultant and game keeper	35	Out and back - July
Jenna Rae Carr	Junior doctor / hairdresser	27	Left - (In a group #4/5/6)
Jack Campbell	Former army officer	31	
Jane Handa	Crew	42	
Jasmine	Personal trainer and yoga instructor	24	Left - (In a group #4/5/6)
Josie	Writer	26	
Katie Tunn	Artist and marine conservationist (forager)	30	
Lloyd Morgan	Locksmith and fisherman	37	Left - Leaving was not mentioned in second series. Camp numbers suggest occurred between Season2 E02 and E03 (#9)
Matt Andrews	Crew	32	
Ollie Sloane	Crew	37	
Rachel	Food development officer (horticulturalist)	29	Left - (#8, 16 Aug 2016)
Raphael Meade	Carpenter	55	Voted Out 8 : 4 The 2 subjects were not asked to vote (#10/11)
Robert Jackson	Engineer Student	26	
Robert P	Vet	28	Left - Early December 2016 (#13)
Stephen	Chef	26	
Sam Brown	Paramedic	25	Left - (In a group #4/5/6)
Tara Zieleman	Life coach	33	Left on 24 May (#1)
Tom Wah	Outdoor instructor	25	Left - July 2016 (#3)

== Broadcast ==
The show was first broadcast weekly on Channel 4, in the 9pm-10pm Monday slot (episode one being an extended 80 minutes). Due to strong language and the presence of animal slaughter, Channel 4 rates the programme as only suitable for viewers over the age of 16.

Channel 4 released extra footage on their website - The Making of Eden, and Counting Down to Eden (featuring some of the participants in the hours before entering the site).

== Episodes ==
=== Series 1 (2016) ===
No.	Title	First broadcast
1	Arrival	18 July 2016
The participants enter Eden; the date 23 March 2016 is given on screen. They enter individually in intervals, congregating on the two buildings and introducing themselves. After choosing to make camp on the site of the existing structures, the first building activity begins with the construction of a drop toilet, a warm shower, a basic kitchen (in the lee of a rock face, covered by tarpaulin) and a communal sleeping area (using the hay in the store to build walls around it). After just a few days, one of the pigs that is not pregnant is slaughtered for food. A large teepee is constructed on the sands for group meetings, using logs and covered with tree branches, complete with a fire. The polytunnels for the garden are also erected. Disliking the group sleeping arrangements, Anton begins sleeping in the toolshed. Having expressed doubts that the exposed nature of the camp site is not going to be suitable given the winds expected during the winter months, Anton begins work on an 8-person hut on a site to the north east, inside the forest but near the coast. The rest of the participants choose to stay on their existing site, extending the hay loft sleeping accommodations and digging into the rock by the kitchen to create basic ovens. Friction develops between Anton and some other participants after he continues to work on the other site, and a group vote of 12 to 10 denies him use of a barrel and some tarpaulin (despite some of the latter having been used to build a sauna). Having been left to roam free, one of the goats dies after eating from an open sack of chicken feed in the tool shed. The group is still largely surviving on their initial rations, and they begin to tire of their mainly potato based diet despite Stephen's best efforts at varying the menus; the few personal items such as tobacco and chocolate that each person brought with them begin to gain in trading value between participants. Fueled by moonshine, romances begin to develop in the group, between Robert P and Katie, and Stephen and Jasmine.
2	Eden	25 July 2016
One month into the experiment, and Anton has moved to his winter site due to the vote to deny him materials. As rations run low, the participants become tired of their potato dominated diet; nonetheless with Jack placed in charge of rations he lays down a potato based menu for breakfast, lunch and dinner, and sets aside staples for the entire year. With participants physical condition deteriorating, a makeshift gym is constructed. With the soil not yet prepared, the garden is behind schedule. To make more progress the group organises itself into work gangs. Although "there should be plenty of fish and crab around" in Spring according to the narrator, there has been no catch yet, so the group agree to fisherman Lloyd building a fisherman's hut so he can redouble his efforts. It is deemed by some that Tara is not pulling her weight, and she is given the boring task of sorting potatoes - feeling isolated and underutilised, she seeks out Anton in his camp. Two fishermen land in a boat on the beach, and inform the group that there won't be any fish in the seas for a month, after which mackerel will begin to arrive. Having begun taking materials without asking, some participants discontentment with Anton comes to a head and Stephen agrees to communicate the group's concerns in person, but it only results in an argument between Anton and the group back at the main camp. After a snowfall, the group begins to worry about Anton when they cannot find him - he returns to the main camp hours later after going for a walk, and by the time the snow is gone the next day, he has decided to move back into the main sleeping quarters. Sugar cravings, particularly among the women, lead to the suspicion of pilfering from the rations - morale is boosted after the fishermen who visited before return with a small package containing sweets, chocolate bars, beer, tinned beans, apples and bananas. Tara is given permission to change her role on a trial basis, becoming the group's masseuse, setting up a parlour in the sauna. After a fishing trip the group manages to catch its first fish, a sea trout, and catch crabs in pots, as well as finding razor clams in the sands - to celebrate a seafood feast is prepared.
3	Rations and Cabins	1 August 2016
Six weeks into the experiment and the garden is still a month away from harvest, and the hens are not laying at full capacity while they still adjust to their new surroundings. Pilfering of rations continues, and disputes emerge over participants perceptions of each other's workrate. With a lack of direction over future plans, a small group use a salvaged pontoon to begin converting the tool shed into a winter dwelling. After a prototype 2 person wicker hut is built the group resolves to eventually relocate to Anton's winter site, and after a motivational speech from Jack, a new system of setting aside one day a week, Fridays, as a community build day to work on it as one workforce is introduced. After Katie is upset by Stephen a confrontation erupts between him and Robert P, leading to her considering leaving. Tensions ease, and the group enjoy a games event featuring volleyball.
4	Spring	8 August 2016
It's Spring, and although the sheep are lambing and a litter of piglets has been born, neither can be eaten for another month yet, and with the fish yield being lower than expected, hunger is beginning to take its toll. The carcass of one of the ewes that had drowned in bog is eaten, and it is also decided to slaughter one of the ewes whose lamb did not survive. Glenn and Caroline are becoming close, preparing a haggis feast for the group from the entrails. A 1980s themed birthday party is held for Stephen. Tensions persist over Tara's perceived lack of effort, although when Rachel reminds the group they intended to vote on whether or not to continue her trial period as a masseuse after two weeks, the group decides she can continue. Glen learns his affections for Caroline are not mutual, with Caroline instead being pursued by Titch, and his mood takes a turn, exacerbated by the fact it is still not yet the hunting season, leading him to question his participation. With complaints about other people's workrate persisting, Glen and some others ponder how those perceived to be the hardest workers could set adrift the lesser members, either by being intentionally difficult or offensive to force them to leave, or to split off into a sub-group, leading to alarm in the rest of the camp. With three months having passed, the group is still some way from self-sufficiency, the weather having delayed some progress but with some now failing to turn up for the community build days on the winter site, Glen doing so out of protest. After a tetchy encounter with Glen, and with conversations with friend Raphael failing to have any effect, Tara concludes she no longer wants to be part of the experiment, and leaves. The remaining participants erect a cross, inscribed Tara, 24 May.

=== Series 2 (2017) — Eden: Paradise Lost ===
No.	Title	First broadcast
1	Eden: Paradise Lost 1/5	7 August 2017
C4 Synopsis: In March 2016, 23 men and women left everyday life behind to start anew in a remote part of the British Isles. Soon their dream turned into a nightmare. As this episode starts the narration states that 2 people have left the project - We know about Tara from season one, while the background video shows a man leaving - no further information is given except that there are now 21 in the project. Some sources list a crew member Ben as having left the show. Glenn fails to bag a deer and leaves with Tom. Glenn returns and despite the rules is allowed to stay. A rebellion ensues with cameras being covered. The group, except for Anton, marches to the gate to leave. Raph makes a call to his family on a production phone. After some debate within the group they return to the compound. Anton tries out the larger boat, that he has repaired and made oars for, in the hope that providing food will help with his relationship within the camp. He is blown away from camp by offshore winds and needs a tow back to camp. Raph debates in interview whether anything Anton did would have helped. Glenn goes hunting a second time and bags a young deer that he drags and then carries back into camp. Now a hero, he is accepted by the others.
2	Eden: Paradise Lost 2/5	8 August 2017
C4 Synopsis: As three more people leave the camp, the men significantly outnumber the women. Tensions grow between the sexes. Meanwhile, Oli and Rachel develop an intense friendship. Three girls are shown leaving, Jenna, Jasmine and Sam. This has broken at least one relationship (Jasmine and Stephen). Ali, the junior doctor, leaves. At this point half the women have now gone. There are complaints about the gardening, which had been left to Rachel. She leaves, and is shown climbing over the fence. She is the sixth woman to leave.
3	Eden: Paradise Lost 3/5	9 August 2017
C4 Synopsis: Oli confronts Anton and Raph about their isolated house in the woods. Their showdown boils over in a dramatic conclusion that changes the group forever. According to narration the camp now has 14 members, implying one person has left. Some sources list Fisherman Lloyd as "Left" but no mention of this is seen in the show. Twelve remain after Anton is forced to leave in a vote of 9 to 3 which is called a 75% majority by ignoring the 2 non voting absent members, those being voted out. Raph gets a leave vote of 8 to 4, permitting him to stay, but decides to leave with Anton anyway.
4	Eden: Paradise Lost 4/5	10 August 2017
C4 Synopsis: The atmosphere in Eden remains hostile with the community effectively split in two. The 'Valley Boys' are increasingly antagonistic. Rob finds it intolerable and Katie is furious. Four men who have split off from the group (Jack, Titch, Steve, Glen), the 'Valley Boys', go on a meat only diet. This means slaughtering the livestock more often than before. One of the people trained for this is Robert, the vet. He is unhappy about the increased rate of slaughter, and leaves in December. Despite the romance between them, Katie decides to stay, although she is very upset.
5	Eden: Paradise Lost 5/5	11 August 2017
C4 Synopsis: It's Christmas Day and the community join together to celebrate. But what greets the group on the morning of their final day in Eden is catastrophic. It is revealed that 'contraband' supplies have been delivered to participants. These included food, drink and a mobile phone. The participants have to decide what to do about this. There is a meeting. No one admits to having a phone, and it is decided that whoever has it can leave it in particular place. Later, a phone is found in the place decided at the meeting. One of the Valley Boys finds a pack of supplies, which he takes (he says 'Finders Keepers' to the fellow Valley Boys), even though he believes it was left by Rob for Katie. Katie realises it is gone and angrily accuses the Valley Boys. Early on the last day of the experiment, Katie's hut burns down.

== Reception ==
With no other added features or elements, the show was described by the Radio Times as an ambitious "new kind of television", being atypical of the reality genre. To avoid piquing the interest of journalists who might otherwise try to independently visit the site, Channel 4 did not release any preview footage.

Since the first episodes were broadcast, there was comment about attempts to contact the team while in the wilderness. Indeed, in one of the episodes there was an interaction with people, who gave them provisions. Channel 4 asked the public to respect the section 11 ruling that allows them to cut off the land for filming.

In March 2017, ten contestants had survived the full year experiment, but arrived home to find that the show had been cancelled after 4 episodes. The UK press picked up that many of the contestants left the site due to the disillusionment with the experiment, as well as tales of apparent near-starvation. Those who had left the camp took to social media, suggesting the editing of the show did not offer a full picture.

== Status ==
Following the first run of four episodes in August 2016, no further episodes were broadcast for a year, and future plans were unclear. This led to speculation in the media about the status of the show and its participants. Channel 4's 2017 preview ad mentions Eden.

On 23 March 2017, it was announced that Eden had finished; but Channel 4 later confirmed that more episodes would be shown in August 2017. On 7 August 2017 Eden: Paradise Lost was scheduled; a previewer said "the group remained in their wilderness, arguing, longing for food and going quietly cuckoo. And suddenly, Eden is back ... oddly compelling in its attritional grimness".

== See also ==
- Castaway 2000, BBC TV Show
- Utopia, 2014 American TV series
