= Clisham =

Mountain in the Outer Hebrides of Scotland

- Scottish Gaelic: An Cliseam
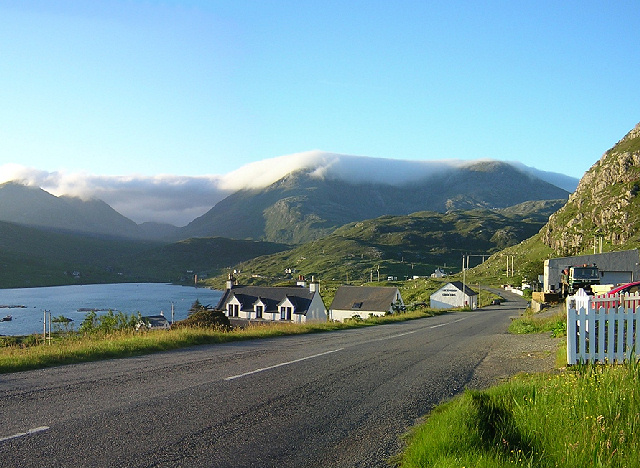
- View of the Clisham from Ardhasaig

Highest point
- Elevation: 799 m (2,621 ft)
- Prominence: 799 m (2,621 ft)
- Isolation: 82.62 km (271,100 ft)
- Coordinates: 57°57′49.32″N 6°48′45″W

Dimensions
- Length: 4.9 km (3.0 mi)

Naming
- Native name: An Cliseam (Scottish Gaelic)
- English translation: Rocky cliff
- Pronunciation: Scottish Gaelic: [əŋ ˈkʰliʃəm]
- Defining authority: Na h-Eileanan an Iar

Geography
- Location within Outer Hebrides Location within Scotland
- Location: Isle of Harris, Outer Hebrides
- Countries: Scotland, United Kingdom
- OS grid: NB154073

The Clisham (Scottish Gaelic: An Cliseam) is a mountain on North Harris, Lewis and Harris in the Outer Hebrides of Scotland. At 799 metres (2,621 ft), it is the highest mountain in the Outer Hebrides and the archipelago's only Corbett. Climbers often encounter light rain and boggy and muddy terrain.

There are a number of paths up to the Clisham's peak. The fastest way to the summit begins at the car park at the bridge along the A859 road between Stornoway and Tarbert and southeast of the mountain. When the visibility is clear, the view from the summit shows all of the Clisham horseshoe peaks: An t-Isean, Mulla bho Dheas, Mulla bho Thuath, and Mullach an Langa. From the southwest side of the peak, Coire Dubh Slabs is visible, and from the north is Aonaig Mhòr.

A more advanced hike traverses the Clisham horseshoe beginning at the northern part of the Abhainn Scaladail and moving upstream to the foot of the Mullach an Langa ridge. The distance of the Horseshoe is about 12.5 km. Another advanced path along the horseshoe starts at the northwest along the ridge made by the Mullach an Langa, Mulla-Fo-Thuath and Mulla-Fo-Dheas.
