= Taransay =

Island in Outer Hebrides, Scotland

Tarasaigh (Gaelic)
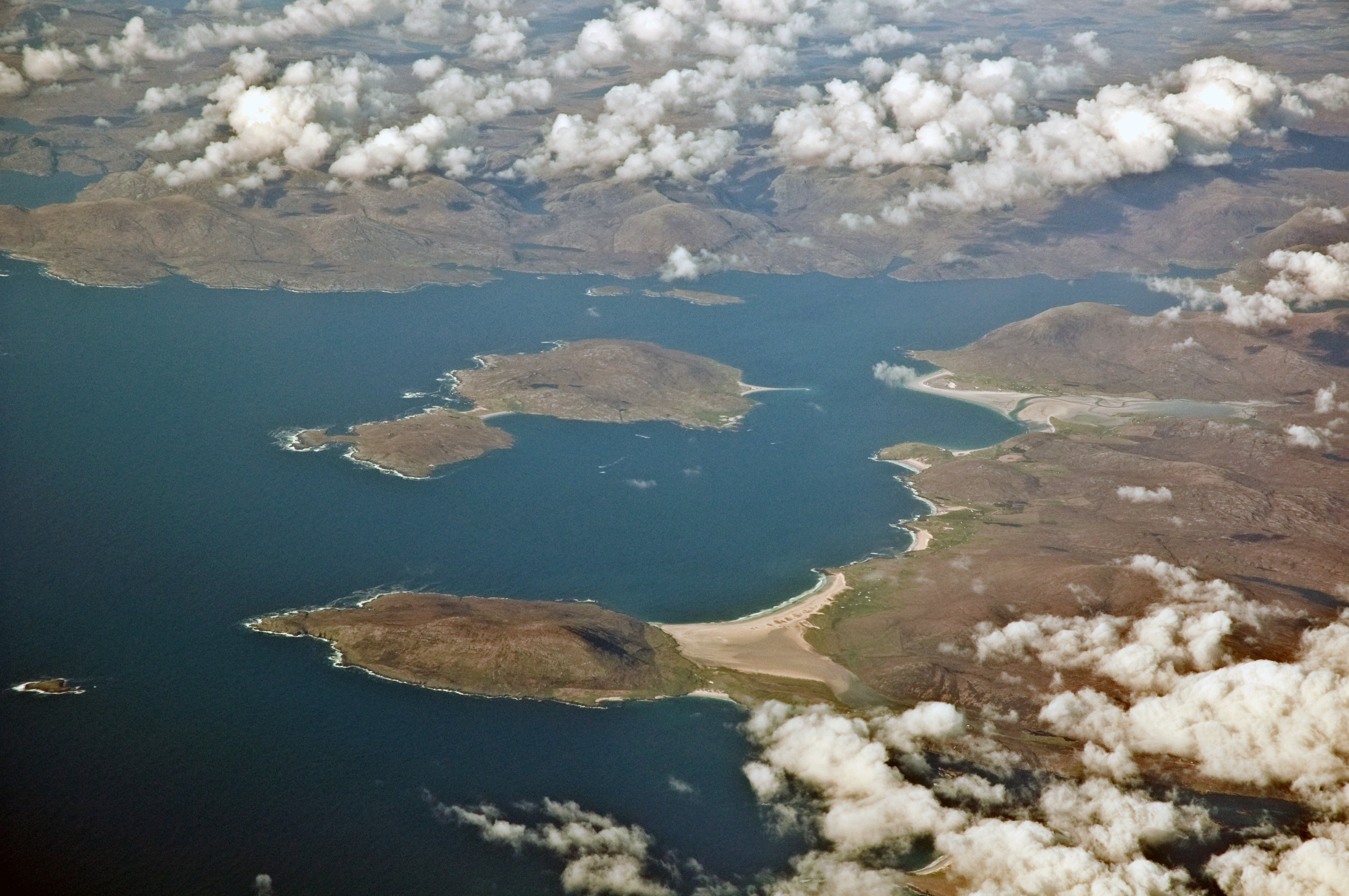
- Taransay in West Loch Tarbert

Location
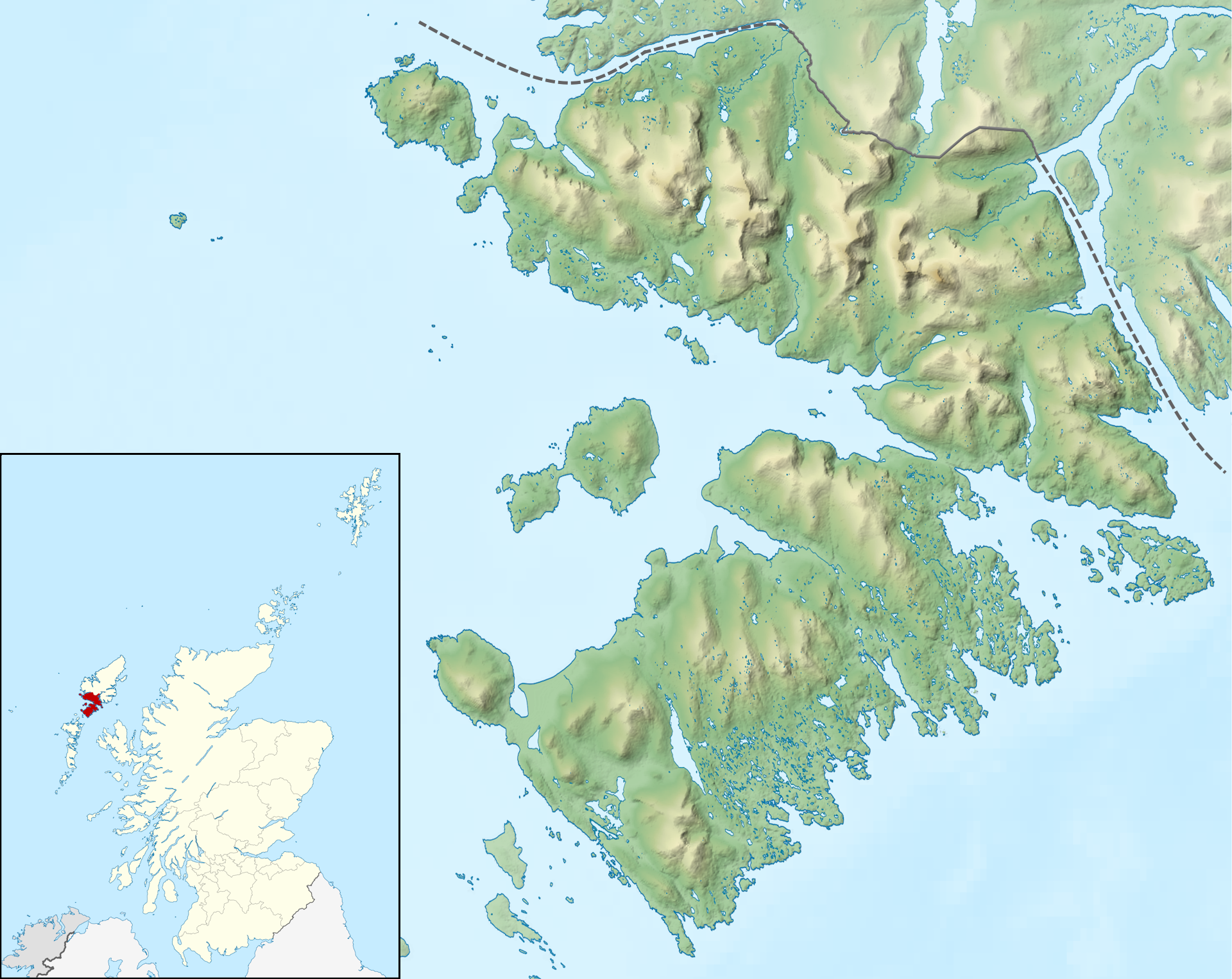
- Taransay shown next to Harris Taransay shown within the Outer Hebrides
- OS grid reference: NB025013
- Coordinates: 57.9°N 7.017°W

Name
- Name meaning: Old Norse for 'Tara island'
- Old Norse name: Taransey

Physical geography
- Island group: Lewis and Harris
- Area: 1,475 ha (5 3/4 sq mi)
- Area rank: 38
- Highest elevation: Ben Raah 267 m (876 ft)

Administration
- Council area: Na h-Eileanan Siar
- Country: Scotland
- Sovereign state: United Kingdom

Demographics
- Population: Uninhabited since 1974
- Largest settlement: Paibeil

Taransay (Scottish Gaelic: Tarasaigh, pronounced [ˈt̪ʰaɾas̪aj]) is an island in the Outer Hebrides of Scotland. It was the host of the British television series Castaway 2000. Uninhabited since 1974, except for holidaymakers, Taransay is the largest Scottish island without a permanent population. It is 1 hectare (2.5 acres) larger than Scarba, which is also uninhabited.

== Geography ==
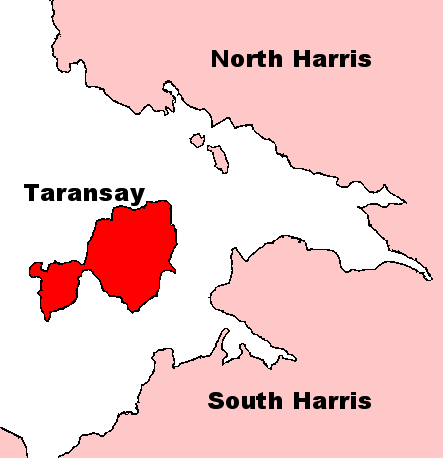

Taransay lies 1 7/8 miles (3 kilometres) from Harris, separated by a stretch of sea called the Sound of Taransay. It is also part of the civil parish of Harris and the Na h-Eileanan Siar council area of Scotland. Crossings between the two islands are dependent on calm weather and there are no harbours for large boats on Taransay or the west coast of Harris. Taransay is 4 miles (6.5 kilometres) long, and, at its widest point, 3.1 miles (5 kilometres) across, with an area of 5 3/4 square miles (14.9 square kilometres).

Taransay is made up of two 750-foot (229-metre) heather-covered hills connected by a white sandy isthmus in the south of the island. It overlooks the bays of Luskyntyre and Seilibost bay to the east, with the Atlantic Ocean to the west. The bays are bordered with sandy beaches and machair dunes. The area is mostly gneiss, with granite veins. The highest point of the island is Ben Raah (Beinn Ra) at 876 feet (267 metres).

== Wildlife ==
The island hosts a variety of birds, but other vertebrate wildlife is limited to red deer and mice. In 2003–2004, the population of American mink on the island was the subject of an eradication programme in order to protect the rare ground-nesting birds. Taransay is however, noted for its flora, with an abundance of wildflowers growing on the island's machair grasslands.

== History ==
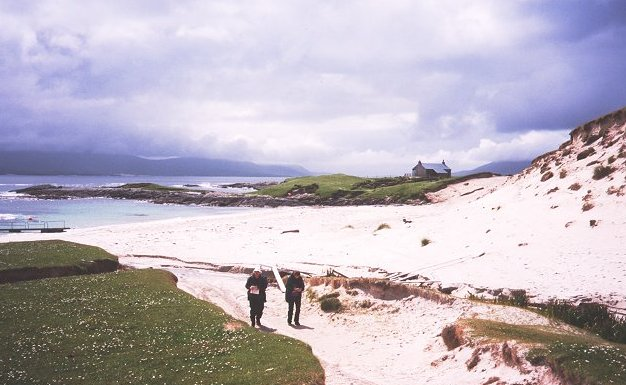
The beach at Paible, Taransay.

The Isle of Taransay was inhabited as early as 300 AD, and probably considerably earlier. Originally home to Celtic pagans, Christianity was established on Taransay around 650 AD. In 900 AD, Taransay was taken over by Vikings when they invaded Scotland. 1544 saw the Massacre of Taransay by the Morrisons of Lewis. Inhabitants from the island of Berneray retaliated against this, forcing the Morrisons to retreat to a rock where they were executed. The rock was later called Sgeir Bhuailte, meaning "smitten rock".

In 1549, Donald Monro wrote of "Tarandsay" that it was:

ane ile of five myle lange, and haffe myle braid, ane rough ile, with certain tounis, weil inhabit and manurit; bot all this fertill is delved with spaides, excepting sa meikell as ane horse pleuch will teill, and yet they have maist abundance of beir, meikel of corn, store, and fishing. It pertains to M'Cloyd of Harrey.

Taransay was once made up of three villages; Raa, Uidh, and Paible (Paibeil). Rent increases in 1835 caused a large decrease in the population of Taransay, made worse in 1883 by new orders that cotter households were no longer allowed to keep livestock or grow neither oats nor barley. The island was abandoned in 1942, and then re-inhabited. In 1961 there was only one family of five, the MacRaes living in the village of Paible, who departed in 1974. Taransay remained uninhabited until 2000 when the island was revived to host the television programme Castaway 2000. During the uninhabited years, the island had been used as a sheep-farm, run from the Harris mainland.

Evidence that Vikings settled on the island can be derived from its name, as the word is an Old Norse translation of "the Isle of Taran". The island was most probably named after the Irish Saint Ternan (also known as Taran or Torannan, see also Taranis), although another theory, reported by Saint Adomnan of Iona, suggests that Taran may have been the son of a Noble Pictish family.

The village of Paible had two ancient chapels; the chapel of Saint Taran and the chapel of Saint Keith. The former was used for the burial of women, and the latter for men. A traditional myth on the island suggests that if this was reversed, the dead would rise and the bodies would be disinterred. The remains of Saint Keith's chapel can still be identified on the ground, and although the burial ground of Saint Taran's was being badly damaged by coastal erosion by at least 1870 and this continued through 2005, the remains of the chapel were still partially intact when rescue archaeology was done at that time.

Taransay still includes remains of Lazy beds (Scottish Gaelic: feannagan), ridges of peat which show evidence of crofting agriculture.

The island was bought in 1967 by John MacKay, for £11,000. In 2011 his sons Angus and Norman MacKay (then the owners) of neighbouring Harris, placed the island up for sale for £2.2 million. Having visited the island several times after the series Castaway finished, including spending his honeymoon there, Ben Fogle expressed an interest in purchasing the island in order to turn it into a wildlife reserve, but he was unsuccessful. The island was sold to Adam and Cathra Kelliher, the owners of Borve Lodge Estate on Harris. The family have an association with Harris, since Cathra's father, Dr David Horrobin, purchased Borve Lodge in 1985. In March 2024, it was reported that the Kellihers plan to return the island to its wild state by reintroducing native trees that had been lost to farming and livestock grazing.

== Castaway ==
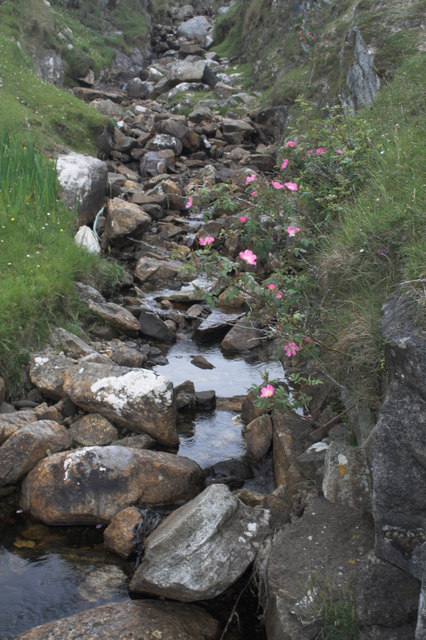
Allt a' Ghill, a burn which runs into Corran Rà sand spit on the east coast

Taransay became well known following the BBC show Castaway. The show featured a group of 36 people marooned on the island for a year starting 1 January 2000. Castaway was broadcast internationally, including to audiences in Germany, America, Canada, Denmark, Australia and New Zealand. The show reached nine million viewers at its peak. The cast was made up of volunteers selected from 4,000 applicants. They lived in temporary accommodation built especially for the show, known as 'pods', which were based in the former village of Paible. Existing buildings on the island included a farmhouse, also called the Mackay house, and a school chalet; both were renovated for the show. Since 2004 these have been available as self-catering holiday cottages for tourist use. According to the BBC website, the project aimed to "create a new society for the new millennium".

Unlike the original inhabitants of the island, the "castaways" had access to electricity and a water supply, as well as limited modern conveniences. Of the 36 who joined the show, 29 remained on the island for the whole year, including Ben Fogle who went on to be a presenter for several BBC shows, including Countryfile. The show was reported to be a social experiment, focusing on how this group would form a community.

The pods where the "castaways" lived were inhabited for a year on Taransay and then de-constructed, flat packed and moved to number of locations around Scotland including the island of Muck and Cove Park Arts Centre on the Rosneath peninsula.

From 2001, when the Castaway show ended, Taransay has been a tourist resort, with the buildings being let as holiday accommodation, and boat trips to the island.

Castaway 2007 was a semi-related follow-up to Castaway 2000. However it was based on the considerably warmer Great Barrier Island, located 90 km (56 mi) north-east of central Auckland in New Zealand.

In 2008, BBC Two broadcast a 5-part series titled Return to... Castaway.

== The Rocket Post ==
A fictionalised account of a 1934 experiment by German inventor Gerhard Zucker to provide a postal service to the island of Scarp by rocket mail formed the basis of a 2001 film called The Rocket Post, which was filmed on Taransay.

== See also ==
- List of islands of Scotland
