= Castaway 2007 =

2007 British television series

- Genre: Reality television
- Created by: Various
- Presented by: Danny Wallace (BBC One); Richard Bacon (BBC Three)
- Country of origin: United Kingdom
- Original language: English
- No. of series: 1
- No. of episodes: 13

Production
- Executive producer: Jeremy Mills
- Producer: Sebastian Grant
- Running time: 30–60 minutes
- Production company: Lion Television

Original release
- Network: BBC One; BBC Three
- Release: 9 March – 27 May 2007

Related
- Castaway 2000; Castaway: The Last 24 Hours; Castaway Exposed

Castaway 2007 is a follow-up to the BBC series Castaway 2000 in which a group of people from the British public are "castaway" on a remote island. While in the 2000 series 36 men, women and children moved to a remote Scottish island for a year, this series featured 15 men and women from the British public who were moved to a New Zealand island for three months.

The basic premise of a group of volunteers living as a community in a remote location remains, however this time the BBC promised an "exotic location, on the other side of the world". Another change since Castaway 2000, was that the castaways were voted off the island one-by-one, in a manner similar to other reality series like Big Brother.

The prize for the winning castaway, which was Jonathan, was a trip around New Zealand with a friend later in the year.

== Broadcast ==
Castaway 2007 was broadcast on BBC One and presented by Danny Wallace, with spin-off shows on BBC Three. The main show was initially 60 minutes long, broadcast each Sunday at 9pm. It was further announced on 11 March 2007 that there would be a spin-off show on weekday evenings called Castaway: The Last 24 Hours. Each show showed the highlights of the previous day and was hosted by Danny Wallace. The spin-off show, Castaway Exposed was broadcast on BBC Three, presented by Richard Bacon.

From 8 April, the show format was changed to three half-hour shows per week at 7pm on Sundays, Tuesdays and Thursdays. This was seen by commentators as a way of moving the show out of prime-time, as its viewing figures had halved since the launch episode.

== Location ==
Location of Harataonga Bay in New Zealand

A number of locations in New Zealand were touted including Durville, Slipper, Rotoroa, Forsyth and Arapawa Islands. The series was filmed in Harataonga Bay on the north-eastern coast of Great Barrier Island.

== Castaways ==
On 7 March, the BBC revealed the thirteen initial castaways, a further two castaways joined the show later.

=== Alasdair 'Lil Al' Humberston ===
Alasdair 'Lil Al' Humberston - (finished 3rd) - 19, from Northamptonshire, is on a double gap year before starting a degree in business. He regards himself as a leader having been deputy head boy at his public school. He wants to be a venture capitalist and make millions. Hobbies include fishing, rugby union and mountain boarding. He also spent some time rapping in a Goldie Looking Chain tribute band. He says: "It would be amazing to chase your breakfast around an island and wrestle with it." He attended Uppingham School in Highfield house for six years. Alasdair made it to the grand final on 27 May and finished third.

=== Alister 'Big Al' Cooling ===
Alister 'Big Al' Cooling - (finished 6th) - 24, from Leeds describes himself as a science fiction fan writer. A self-confessed couch potato, Al jokingly lists his friends to be the TV, the computer and the Hi-Fi. Al claimed his reason for going on the Island was to prove larger people can do what everyone else can. Big Al became the tenth Castaway to be voted off the island on 22 May receiving the fewest votes from viewers to keep him on the island.

=== Catherine 'Cathy' Ball ===
Catherine 'Cathy' Ball - (finished 4th) - 27, from Nuneaton, is a PhD student. She describes herself as an intellectual and is a speaker of five languages - English, German, French, Spanish and Thai. Cathy also stated that, "I'd like to get away from life as we know it; to challenge myself. To refresh my love of life and of other people". Catherine was the fourteenth Castaway to arrive on the island, joining Jason on day 15 on 'Banishment Beach' before being introduced to the other Castaways back on the main island. Cathy made it to the grand final on 27 May and finished fourth.

=== Catrin 'Cat' Lye ===
Catrin 'Cat' Lye - (finished 7th) - 20, from Cardiff is a Psychology student who describes herself as outgoing, excitable, very talkative and very argumentative. She admits that she can be very moody at times. She says: I'm a 'normal' Welsh girl ready to represent Wales and show we're not all weird, stupid and blonde!" Catrin joined the Castaways after entering the "Cast Me" competition where viewers voted her onto the island through the official website, beating three others for the final place on the island. Catrin became the ninth Castaway to be voted off the island on 22 May receiving the fewest votes from viewers to keep her on the island.

=== Clare Hilley ===
Clare Hilley - (finished 14th) - 22, from London wants to be a Conservative MP. Last year she was the youngest candidate to stand in a local election in the UK. She sees herself as a natural leader and admits she can be confident to the point of arrogance. She works as a recruitment consultant and hobbies include gliding, flying, sailing and walking. She says: "This experience will teach me what matters most to me and what I want the next chapter of my life to be." Clare became the second person to be voted off the island by her fellow Castaways, leaving the island on 28 April after spending eight weeks on the show.

=== Erica Hurst ===
Erica Hurst - (finished 10th) - 22, from Bolton has a degree in media studies. She used to work as a lap dancer, and aspires to be an actress. In her spare time she is a freelance travel writer for her local paper. Hobbies include snowboarding, Thai boxing and extreme sports. She says: "It is the type of situation I have always dreamed to be in where I could see what my full potential is." Erica became the sixth Castaway to be voted off the island on 17 May receiving the fewest votes from viewers to keep her on the island.

=== Francie Smee ===
Francie Smee - (finished 2nd) - 56, recently divorced after 20 years of marriage and started a new life in Oxford. She has three grown-up daughters, and describes herself as tall, bossy, fun and adventurous with a passion for outdoor life. Her skills include cooking, gardening, hiking, cycling, DIY, hunting and trapping. She says: "I need to feel good about myself, to regain confidence after a divorce, to fulfil a dream of having an adventure." Francie made it to the grand final on 27 May and finished second. Francie also appeared in the regional heats of Britain's Best Dish, which was shown in September 2008. In February 2014, Francie appeared on ITV game show Tipping Point, being eliminated in Round 3.

=== Gemma Zinyama ===
Gemma Zinyama - (finished 11th) - 22, from Essex works as a classified sales executive. A city girl at heart, she says she's not good at cooking and cleaning. She says: "I'd like to be educated by others and maybe I'll come back realising how lucky my life is and rethink my attitude towards certain issues in life." Gemma became the fifth Castaway to be voted off the island on 15 May receiving the fewest votes from viewers to keep her on the island.

=== Hassan Kobeissi ===
Hassan Kobeissi - (finished 12th) - 24, from Suffolk works as a labourer. He has qualifications in business studies and performing arts. A non-practising Muslim, Hassan says he never backs down from an argument and likes to win. He lists swimming, running, boxing, fishing, tennis and golf among his hobbies. He says: "Being on Castaway will get me out of this robotic lifestyle that most of us lead." Hassan became the fourth Castaway to be voted off the island on 13 May receiving the fewest votes from viewers to keep him on the island.

=== Jason Ross ===
Jason Ross - (finished 15th) - 37, from Kent is currently unemployed and a recovering drug and alcohol addict. He's been clean for 18 months. A qualified carpenter, he has a seven-year-old son whom he describes as one of his biggest personal achievements. Originally from London, Jason likes his food and is worried about shortages on the island. He says: "I'd like to gain a sense of self, a deeper respect for life and learn how to cope with the bare essentials." Jason was voted off the island by his fellow Castaways on 25 March, becoming the first person to leave the island.

=== Joe Chicken ===
Joe Chicken - (finished 9th) - 33, lives in London and is an occupational therapist. A self-confessed entertainer, he's passionate about animals and environmental issues. Hobbies include kayaking, swimming in the sea and cycling. He says: "I will occupy myself by playing hide and seek, telling jokes doing treasure hunts and dancing like a doughnut!" Joe became the seventh Castaway to be voted off the island on 20 May receiving the fewest votes from viewers to keep him on the island.

=== Jonathan Shearer ===
Jonathan Shearer - (finished 1st) - 41, has spent many years as a migrant worker around the world - mainly working as a teacher. A self-confessed loner, Jonathan lives on the island of Benbecula in Scotland. He's currently cleaning toilets and hotel rooms to support his ornithology habit. He lists his other jobs as professional psychic, sewer digger and zookeeper (especially tigers). He says: "I have a strong dislike for the kind of deeply earnest, green, touchy-feely idiots whom I suspect you are going to populate your island with." Jonathan made it to the grand final on 27 May and won Castaway 2007.

=== Kenneth 'Ken' Rose ===
Kenneth 'Ken' Rose - (finished 8th) - 65, from Essex spent 22 years in the Royal Marines and says he's still a military man at heart. In civilian life, he's pursued his interest in photography. He's also skilled at DIY, carpentry and can kill animals and fish for food. Ken admits he doesn't get angry easily but can come across as aggressive without realising it. He says: "At my age it might be the last chance to do something outrageous." Ken became the eighth Castaway to be voted off the island on 20 May receiving the fewest votes from viewers to keep him on the island.

=== Lucinda King ===
Lucinda King - (finished 13th) - 27, is an events project manager in London. The ex-convent girl has a degree in interior and architecture design. She admits that she comes across as confident and flirtatious, but on the inside is sensitive and "constantly dreaming about where life will take me". She says: "Castaway would take me away from everything I know - it would be the ultimate challenge." After she was caught stealing from the production team, on 7 May the other castaways had to choose whether Lucinda should stay and be punished, or send her home immediately; they chose the latter, making her the third person to leave the island.

=== Wendie Mitchell ===
Wendie Mitchell - (finished 5th) - 42, from London is a mother of four who gave up her advertising agency career last year to become a full-time carer for her mother. A skinhead for many years, Wendie runs a website dedicated to ska music. She says she can be a bit bossy and controlling at times. She says: I'd like to do something for myself after a year of taking care of others." Wendie became the eleventh Castaway to be voted off the island on 24 May receiving the fewest votes from viewers to keep her on the island. Wendie appeared on an episode of Hotter Than My Daughter broadcast on BBC Three on 25 February 2010.
