= Mark de Rond =

Professor of Organizational Ethnography at Cambridge University

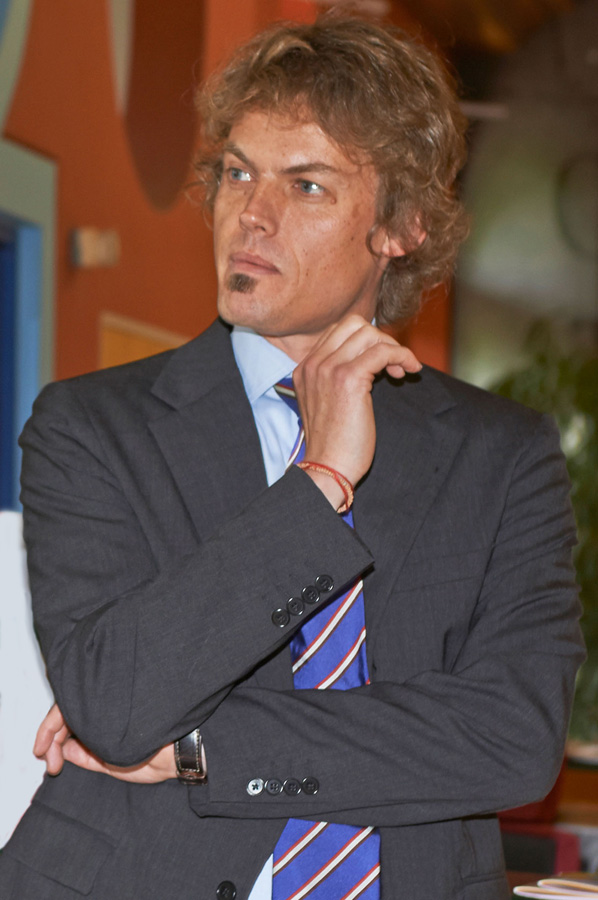
- de Rond in 2013
- Occupations: Writer, ethnographer, professor, researcher
- Writing career
- Period: Late 20th – early 21st century
- Genre: non-fiction
- Subjects: Sport, war, travel, activism
- Website: www.rowtheamazon.com

Mark de Rond is Professor of Organizational Ethnography at Cambridge University (Judge Business School). He studies people by living with them under similar conditions so as to better understand how they experience, and develop meaningful relations to the world around them. His fieldwork has included stints with war surgeons in Afghanistan, elite rowers in Cambridge, biochemists in Oxford, comedians in London and Edinburgh, and peace activists on a protest march from Berlin to Aleppo. It also includes an effort to row the length of the Amazon River so as to learn, first-hand, how collaboration unfolds and how problems are solved under trying conditions.

His book Strategic Alliances as Social Facts: Business, Biotechnology & Intellectual History received the 2005 George R Terry Book Award from the Academy of Management, awarded annually to the book judged to have made the most significant contribution to advancing management knowledge. His subsequent book The Last Amateurs was selected by The Financial Times as one of 12 Best Business Books of 2008, and by BBC Sport as one of 10 Best Sporting Reads of 2008. His portfolio of work was awarded the 2009 Imagination Lab Award, given to one academic each year for scholarship that is both innovative and rigorous, and the 2016 Sandra Dawson Research Impact Award. His most recent book, “Doctors at War”, was awarded the 2018 EGOS Best Book Award, and was a finalist for the 2018 George R Terry Award and 2018 Outstanding Qualitative Book Award. An article based on this fieldwork received the 2016 Best Article Award from the Academy of Management Journal.

His research has featured widely in the press, including in The Economist, TIME magazine, Forbes, The Financial Times, The Times, The Sunday Times, The Guardian, The Week, Der Spiegel, The Los Angeles Times, CNN,Newsweek, The Wall Street Journal, and on the BBC. His photographs have been published in The Independent, The Daily Mail, The Daily Telegraph and on the BBC News.

In 2011 de Rond embedded with a team of surgeons in Camp Bastion, Afghanistan, to understand how they collaborate, organize and think about their work. As an extension of his research into teaming in difficult environments, de Rond and a Cambridge colleague completed the first unsupported row of the entire length of the River Amazon, securing a Guinness World Record in the process. In 2017, he spent time with peace activists on a walk from Berlin to Aleppo (Civil March for Aleppo) and, for the past four years, has embedded himself with one of Britain's most active paedophile hunting teams. All of his work is tied together by an interest in how people live challenging circumstances on their own terms, in the explanations they give for why things are as they are, and in the compromises they make with life and those around them.

== Career ==
=== Books ===
There is An I in Team studied the reasons behind the success of high performing elite athletes and world-class sports teams, featuring de Rond's interviews with players and sports coaches from around the world.

The Last Amateurs: To Hell and Back with the Cambridge Boat Race Crew (foreword by Sir Steve Redgrave) is de Rond's first-hand account of living for a year with the Cambridge boat race team as they prepare for their annual sporting rivalry with Oxford University in the famous Boat Race. Noted as being as 'the first ever ethnographical study of one of the most famous rowing clubs in the world' and described as "de Rond's intense and deeply personal account of freezing early-morning training sessions, booze-fueled crew 'formals'; the tenderness of camaraderie, the pain of self-doubt, and the tantrums and testosterone of crew members, each set on becoming a Cambridge Blue".

It was favourably reviewed by The Times'("Sports journalism of the highest order", Patrick Kidd, The Times, August 2008), The Guardian and was named by The Financial Times in their 'Best Business Books of 2008' and by the BBC in their 'Best Sporting Reads of 2008'.

Strategic Alliances as Social Facts de Rond's account, based on three in-depth case studies, emphasises the social dimension and the importance of the individuals involved inside business alliances. For Strategic Alliances, de Rond became in 2005 the then youngest ever recipient of the George R. Terry Book Award from the Academy of Management.

=== Camp Bastion ===
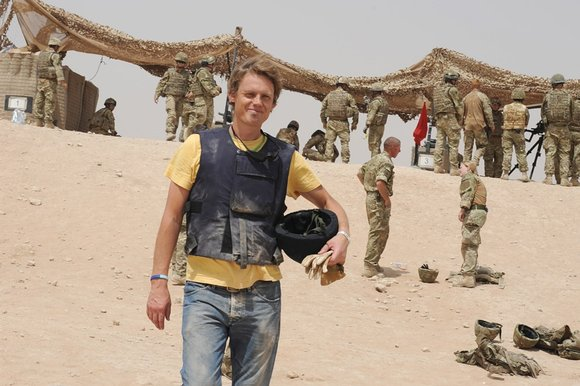
In Camp Bastion, Afghanistan, 2011

In 2011, as part of an ethnographic study, de Rond spent six weeks observing Army surgeons at work in Camp Bastion, the main British military base in Afghanistan. De Rond prepared for his deployment there with UK-based training, and the deployment itself was as a result of two years' work and training with the military.

De Rond described his trip as an "old fashioned attempt at trying to understand teams by living with them under similar conditions" and specifically his work at Bastion: "I wanted to see how the staff at Bastion coped with what was going on all around them, how the team functioned under all that pressure. I was there just to observe and record what was going on, but, of course, I could not help being affected myself. It is very difficult seeing a child missing a leg, or a teenage soldier who is a double amputee."

During his deployment, de Rond was given permission to film and photograph the surgeons at work as they dealt with IED bomb casualties from British and American forces and also local adult and children casualties caused by IEDs and in firefights in the areas surrounding the camp.

=== 'Row The Amazon' – first ever unsupported row of the Amazon River ===
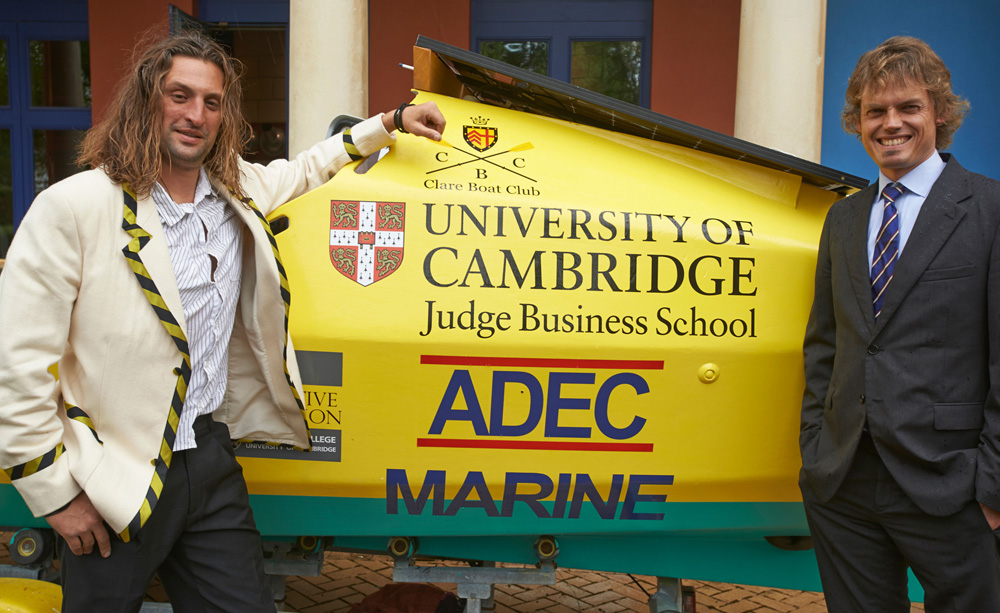
Row The Amazon expedition boat with crew, Anton Wright and Mark de Rond

In September 2013, de Rond and the Head Boatman of Clare College, Anton Wright, embarked on an attempt to be the first people ever to row unsupported the entire length of the Amazon River, starting in Nautu, Peru on 1 September 2013, and reaching the Brazilian coastal town of Macapa six weeks later. The specially commissioned Row The Amazon website, featuring blog updates of the pair's progress during the expedition, described the event as "2077 miles. Two men. One boat. A long way from the University of Cambridge".

The news agency Reuters referred to it is as an expedition where de Rond and Wright "will brave piranhas, bandits and disease in an attempt to be the first crew to row the length of the Amazon river." and described how "They will sleep in turns at night to keep watch for runaway logs in the water which could destroy their boat, anacondas, bull sharks, thieves, illegal logging and mining operators trying to keep their locations secret and drug traffickers in Brazil's vast rainforest."

De Rond was interviewed by the BBC's Jeremy Sallis and BBC East on the dangers of an unsupported trip down the Amazon including the threats to health and the risk of kidnapping. Although during the journey they will be out of telephone and email contact with the world, de Rond stated that they aimed on using a Voyage Manager technology that would allow them to share their progress with people following the expedition, to communicate with the outside world during the trip and, in the event of an emergency, to provide their exact location for rescue.

"I do a fair amount of research about people in difficult circumstances and decided to put my money where my mouth is and do something different myself. We have both rowed for many years but we think the biggest challenge is in the mind. It is the psychology more than the physiology. We know there will be problems. There will be parasites. There is debris in the river so it would be nice not to hit anything. We will try to row about 100 km (62 mi) a day so we will sleep in the boat. We plan to sleep for two hours and keep watch for two hours alternating between us. We will just have to go with the flow."
Marc de Rond, Cambridge News, July 2013

One of the stated aims of the expedition is to raise money for Leonard Cheshire Disability, a charity supporting disabled people living independently in the UK and around the world.

On 15 October, de Rond and his rowing partner, Anton Wright, completed the aim of the Row The Amazon expedition and became the first people to row unsupported the entire length of the Amazon River. The feat was covered throughout by posts on a dedicated website, www.rowtheamazon.com, and messages on Twitter by supporters and by de Rond and Wright.

==== Guinness World record ====
The official Guinness World Record certificate acknowledging the achievement of the Amazon row expedition was presented to de Rond and Wright at the British Consulate in São Paulo on 15 October 2013.

== Publications ==
- Strategic Alliances as Social Facts. Cambridge University Press, 2003.
- The Last Amateurs: To Hell and Back with the Cambridge Boat Crew. Icon Books, 2008.
- There is An I in Team. Harvard University Press, 2012.
- Doctors at War. ILR Press, 2017.

== Awards ==
- Winner in the Academic Research category of the 2024 Financial Times Responsible Business School Education Awards
- Sandra Dawson Research Impact Award, 2023
- The Last Amateurs listed on the JP Morgan “Words of Inspiration” Reading List Special (22 most inspiring books for difficult times from 20 years of reading lists), 2020
- EGOS Book Award (for Doctors at War), 2018
- The Last Amateurs listed as “One of 30 best ever sports books”, Metro, 2018
- Gold Winner in the Feature Story Category, Prix de la Photographie Paris, 2013
- Gold Winner in the War Category, Prix de la Photographie Paris, 2013
- BBC Sport Best Sporting Reads of 2008 (The Last Amateurs)
- Financial Times Best Business Books of 2008 (The Last Amateurs)
- Fulbright Distinguished Scholar Award, 2007/8
- George R. Terry Award for Strategic Alliances, for the most outstanding contribution to the advancement of management knowledge, Academy of Management, 2005
