= Harris, Outer Hebrides =

Region of Lewis and Harris island, Scotland

Harris
Na Hearadh (Gaelic)
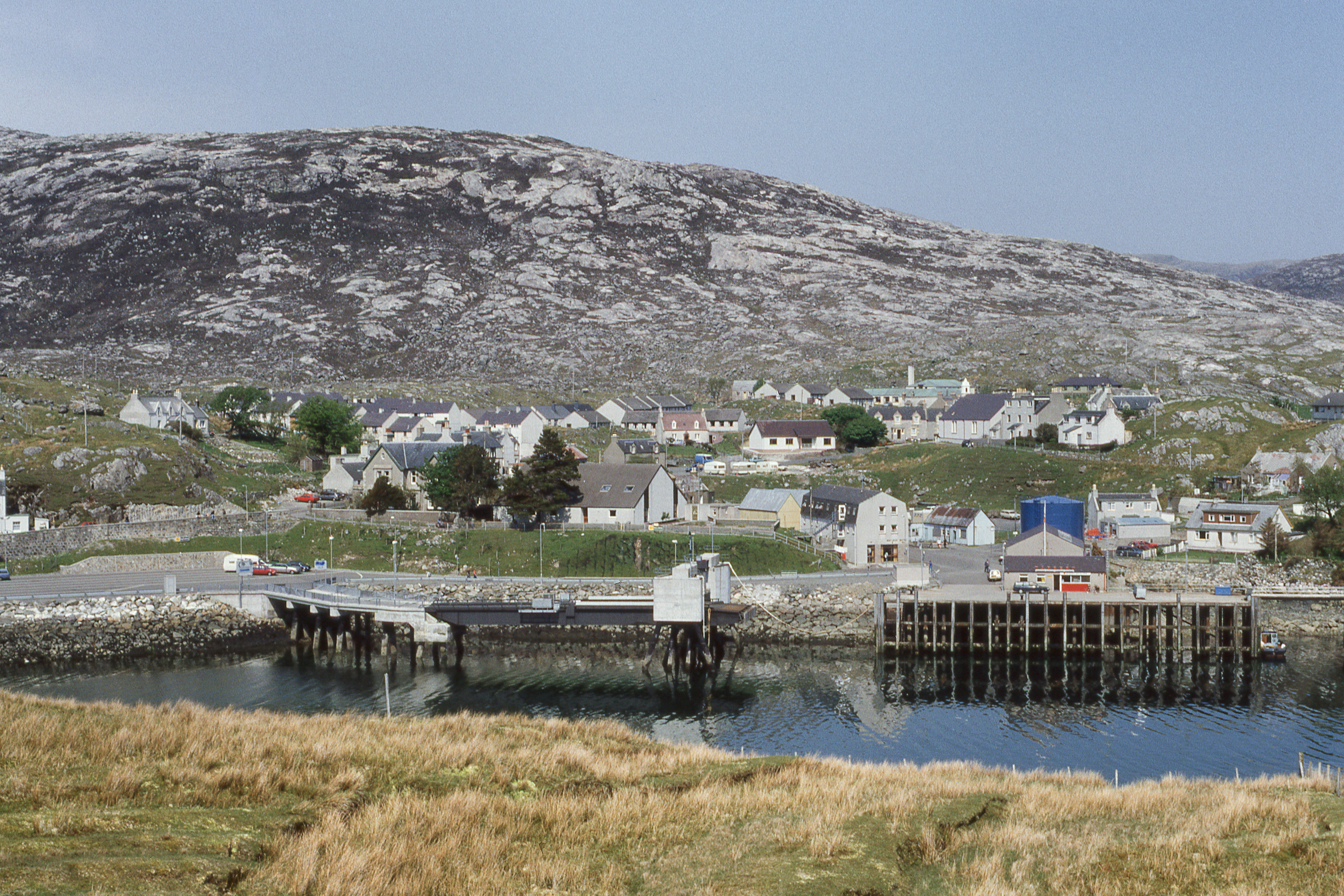
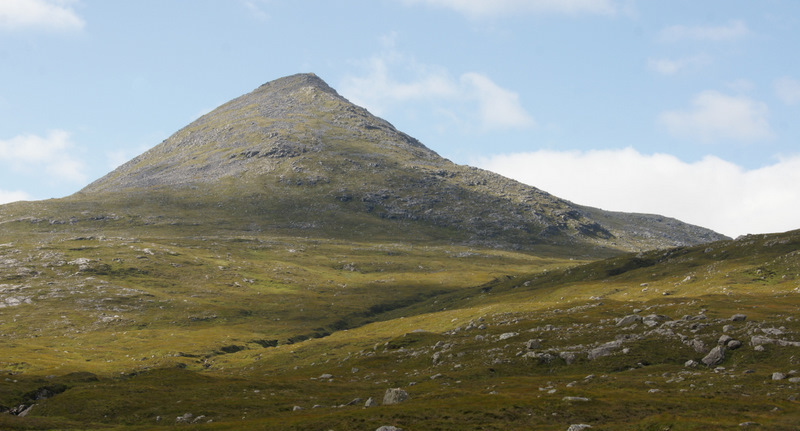
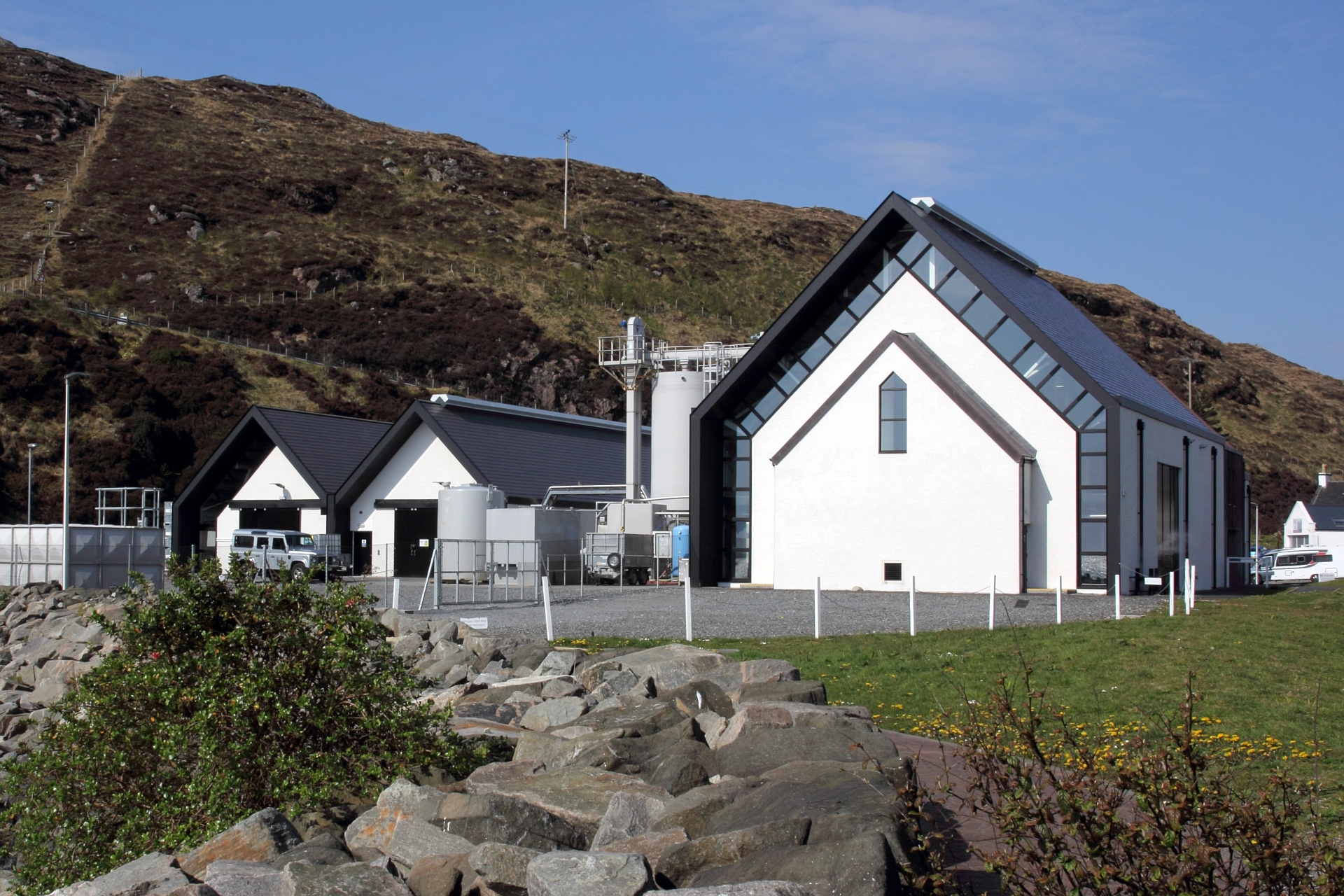
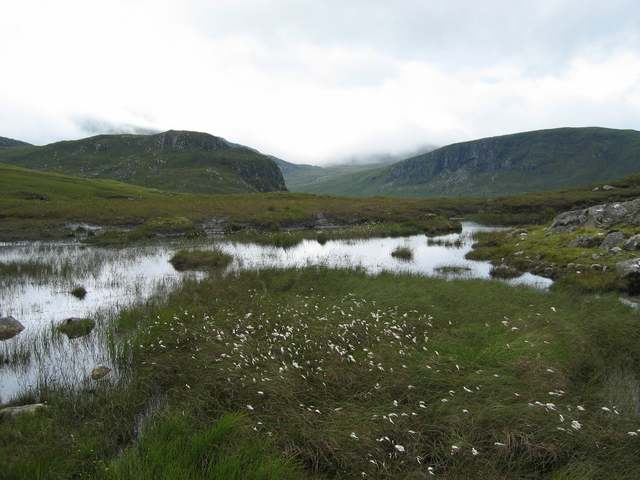
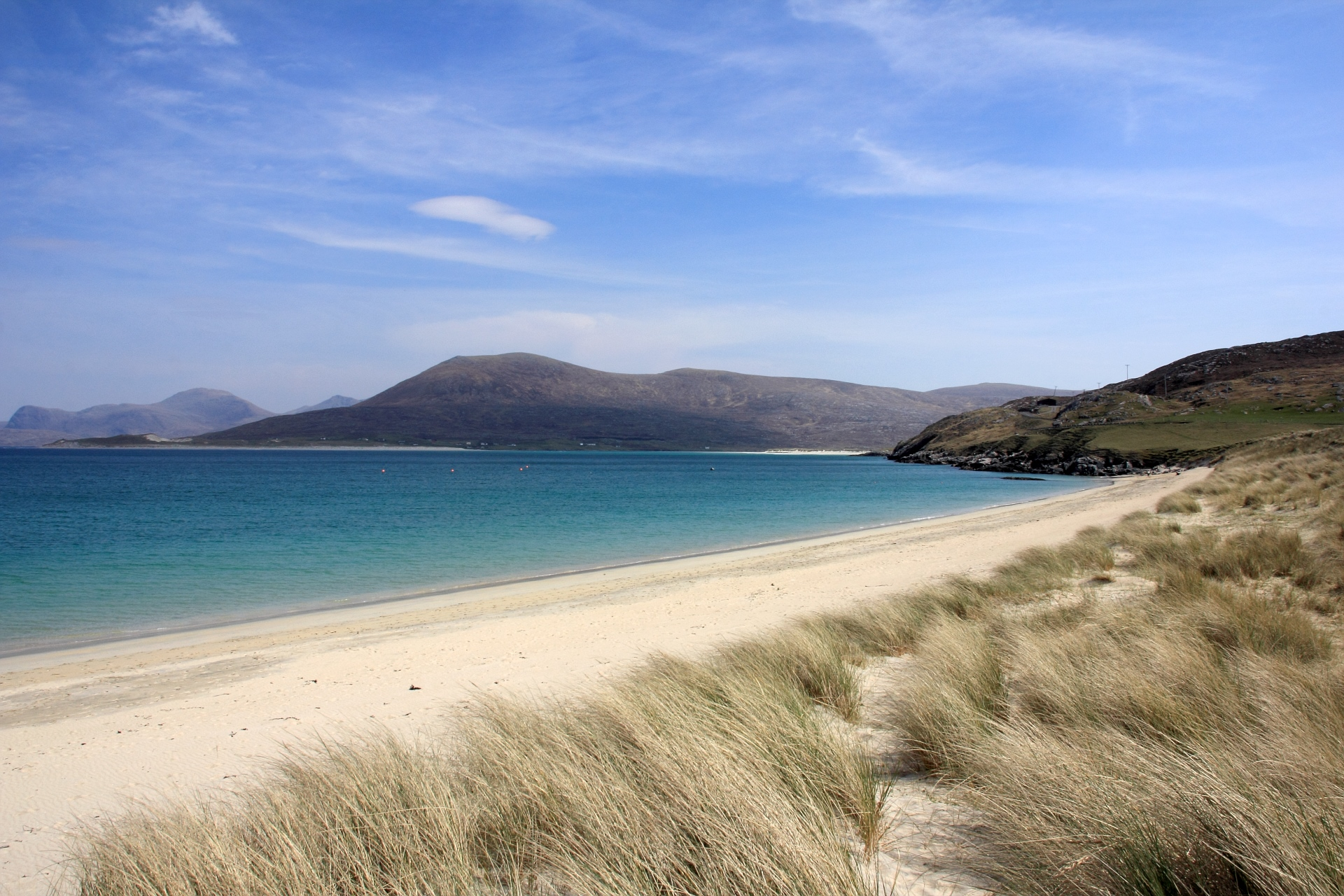
- Tarbert Clisham Harris Distillery North Harris Beach at Nisabost

Location
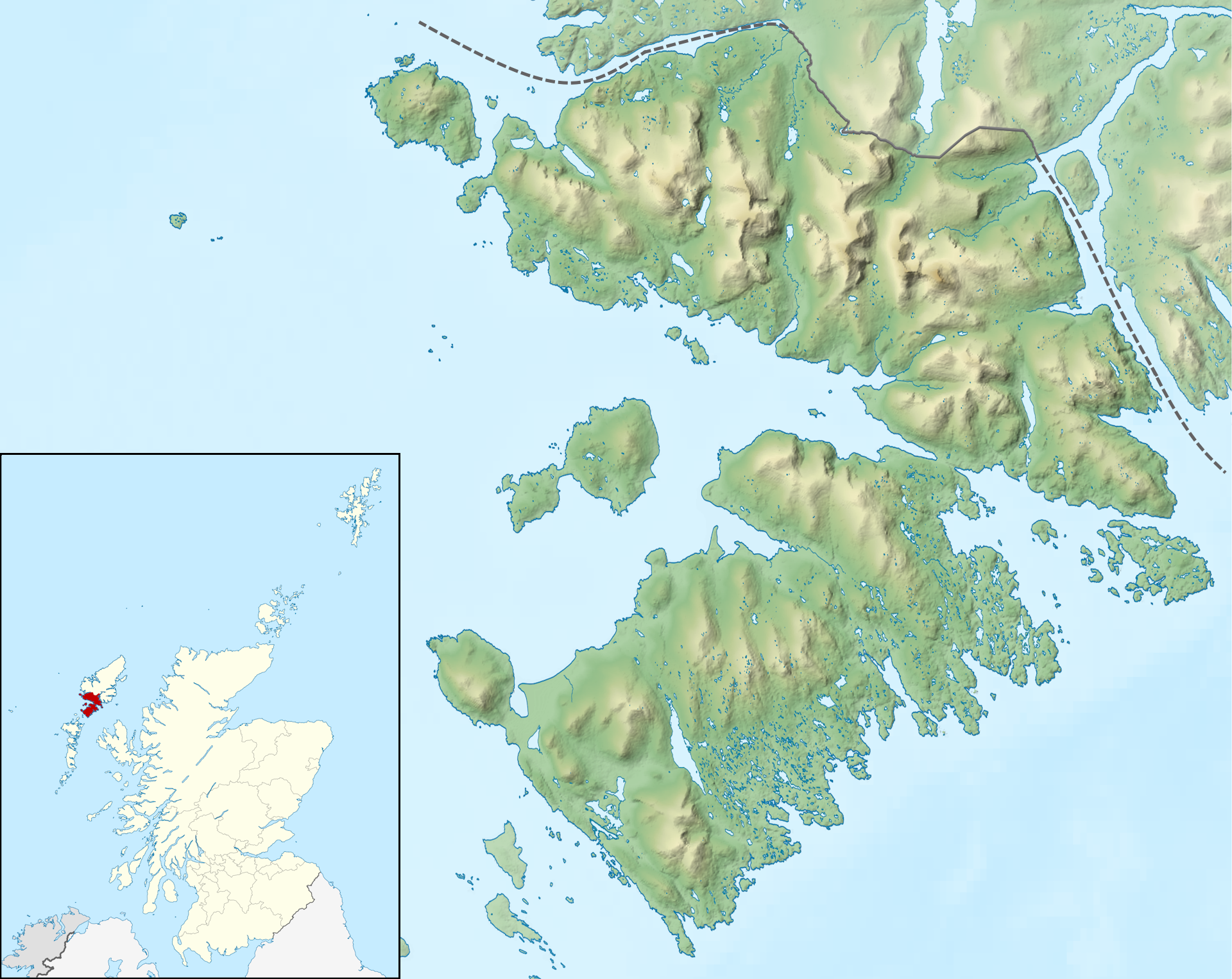
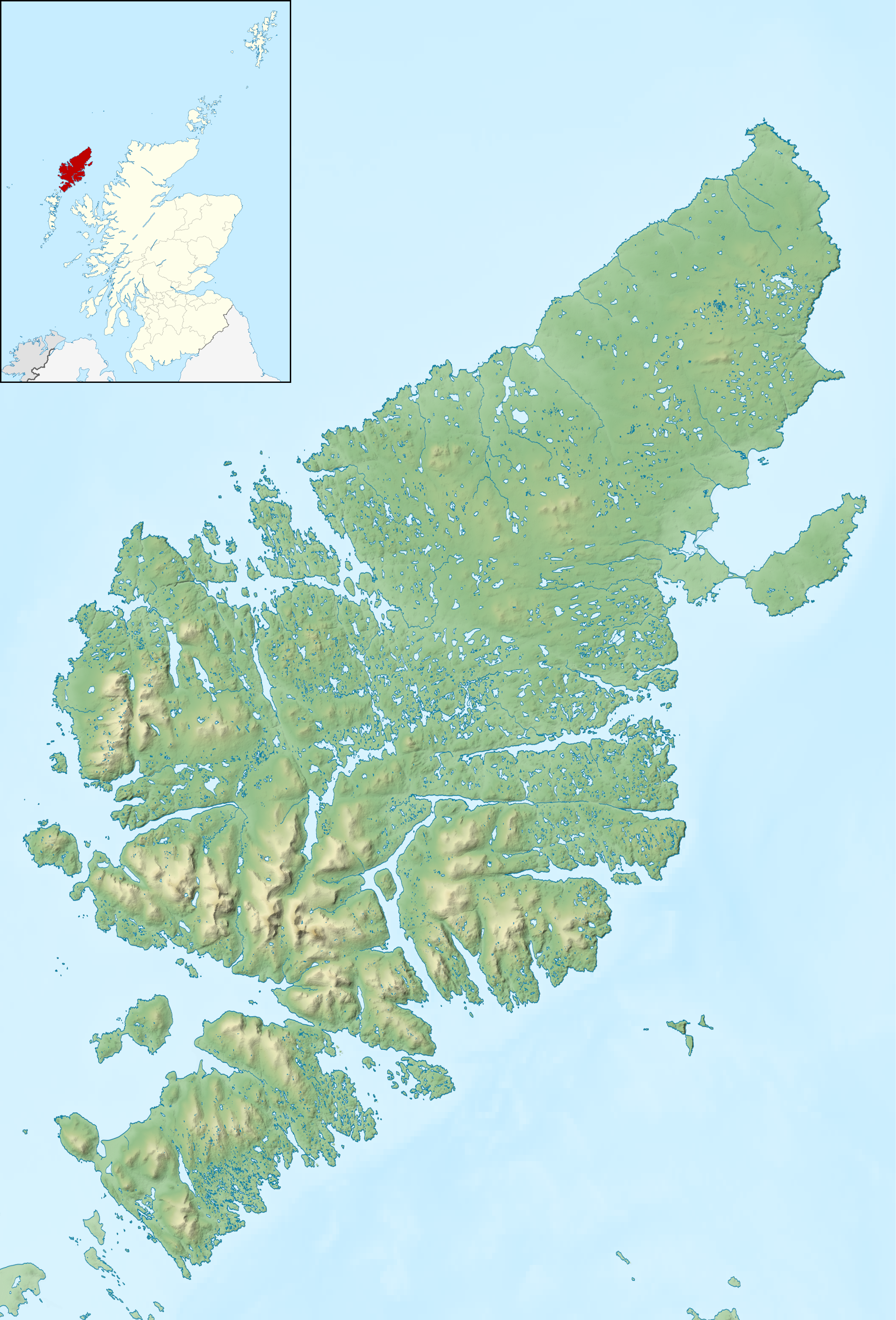
- Map of Harris & surrounding islands Harris within Lewis and Harris Harris within the Outer Hebrides Harris within Scotland
- OS grid reference: NB155005
- Coordinates: 57.91°N 6.83°W

Physical geography
- Island group: Lewis and Harris
- Highest elevation: Clisham, 799 m (2,621 ft)

Administration
- Council area: Comhairle nan Eilean Siar
- Country: Scotland
- Sovereign state: United Kingdom

Demographics
- Population: 1,916
- Largest settlement: Tarbert

Harris (Scottish Gaelic: Na Hearadh, pronounced [nə ˈhɛɾəɣ]) is the southern and more mountainous part of Lewis and Harris, the largest island in the Outer Hebrides, Scotland. Although not an island itself, Harris is often referred to in opposition to the Isle of Lewis as the Isle of Harris, which is the former postal county and the current post town for Royal Mail postcodes starting HS3 or HS5.

The civil parish of Harris is considered to include St Kilda, a now uninhabited archipelago 40 miles (65 kilometres) west-northwest of North Uist, and the uninhabited islet Rockall, which is 230 miles (370 kilometres) west of North Uist.

== Etymology ==
The Vikings arrived in the British Isles from the late 700s, and in the Northern Isles and Western Isles of Scotland they named places as part of their conquest. Documents from several centuries ago show the Isle of Harris being referred to as Haray or Harray, Here or Herre, Herrie, and the plural Harreis; as well as possibly related place names such as Harris on the isle of Rùm; Herries in Dumfries; Harray on Orkney; and Harrastadhir (Harrastaðir) in Iceland. The place-name Harris has been suggested to be based on Old Norse hærri, meaning 'higher', a reference to the high hills, especially in comparison with the much flatter Lewis lying to the north.

The name of this island in Gaelic is "Na h-Earradh". The isles of the Hebrides once had Gaelic names, however the Norsemen renamed them.

The Gaelic name "Na Hearadh" was also an earlier term for the Rinns of Islay.

Most of the place names on Harris are Gaelicized Old Norse.

Harris is most likely to be the island referred to as Adru (meaning 'thick, stout or bulky') on Ptolemy's map of the British Isles.

== Gaelic ==
As of 2011, there were 1,212 Gaelic speakers in Harris, corresponding to roughly 60% of the population. The Gaelic dialect spoken is a Southern Hebridean dialect related to that of Uist, though it also shares certain similarities with Lewis.

== Geography ==
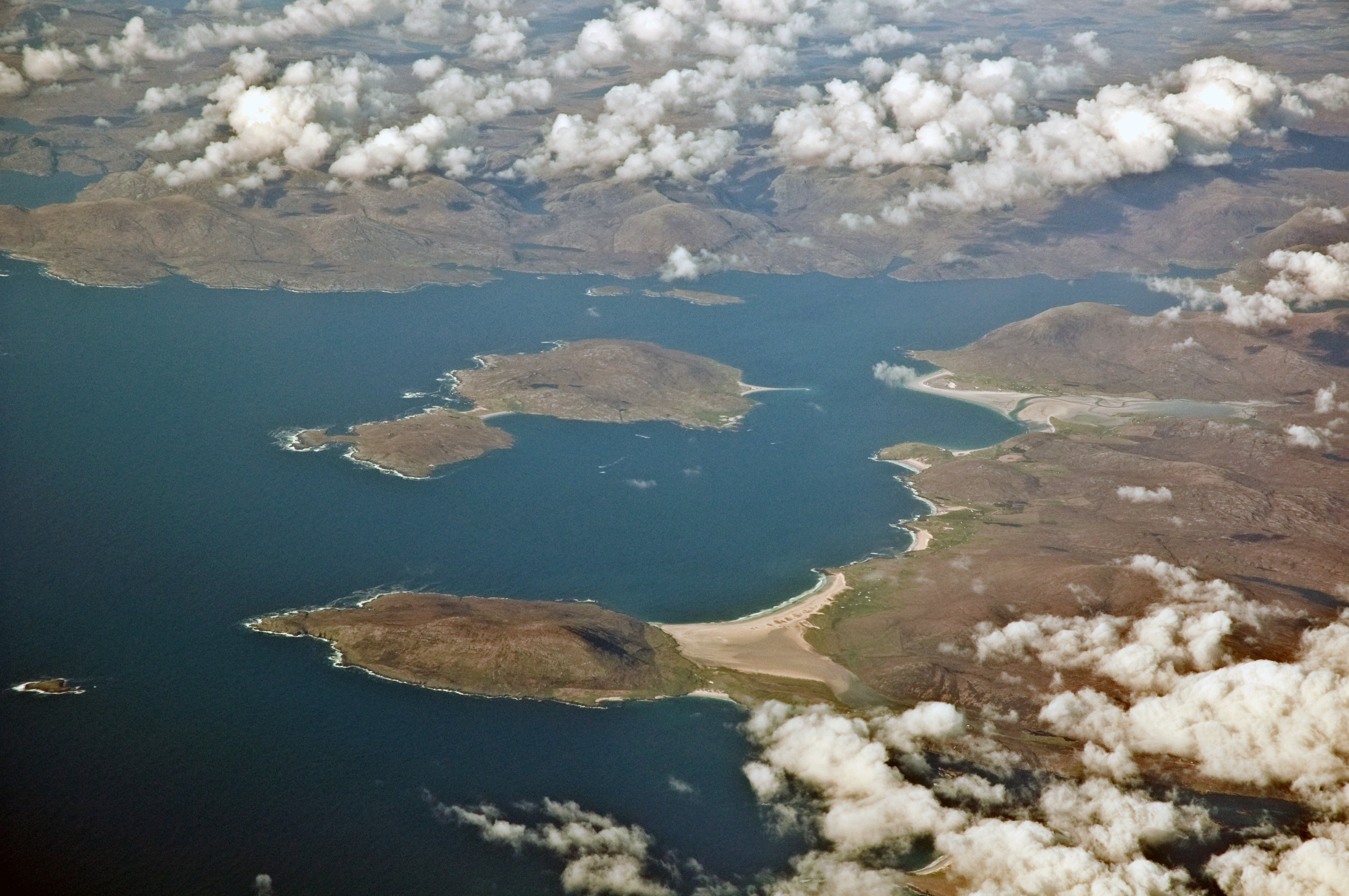
West Loch Tarbert and Taransay

The boundary between Lewis and Harris is approximately a line from the head of Loch Resort on the west coast to the closest point of Loch Seaforth on the east coast. Harris itself divides naturally into northern and southern parts which are separated by West and East Loch Tarbert. These halves are joined by a narrow isthmus at the main settlement of Tarbert (An Tairbeart or Tairbeart na Hearadh).

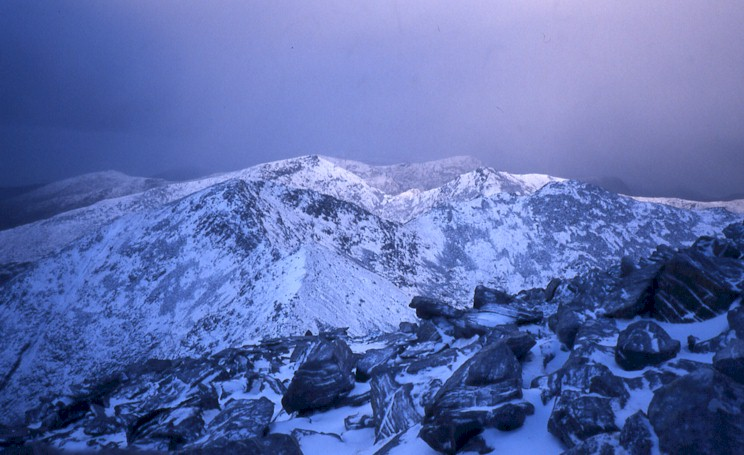
An Cliseam, Harris

The bedrock of Harris is largely Lewisian gneisses, which were laid down in the Precambrian period, interspersed with igneous intrusions. One of these intrusions forms the summit plateau of the mountain Roinebhal. The rock here is anorthosite, and is similar in composition to rocks found in the mountains of the Moon.

Harris is a part of historic Inverness-shire, and was administered as such under older administrative divisions. In the 2001 census, Harris had a usually resident population of 1,916. It is part of the South Lewis, Harris and North Uist National Scenic Area, one of 40 in Scotland.

=== North Harris ===
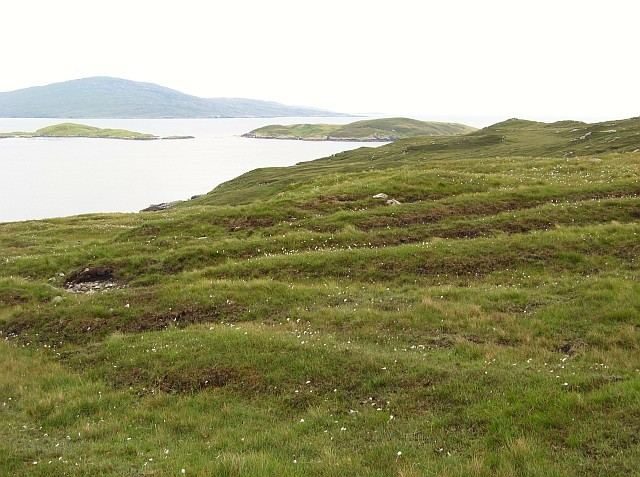
Old feannagan, or "lazy beds" on North Harris

North Harris, adjoining Lewis, contains Clisham (An Cliseam), the highest mountain in the Outer Hebrides at 799 metres (2,621 ft). The area is sparsely populated. Beyond Tarbert, the furthest settlement is Hushinish (Hùisinis) on the west coast. A bridge from the east coast links Harris to the island of Scalpay (Sgalpaigh na Hearadh).

In March 2003 the 25,300-hectare (62,500-acre) North Harris Estate was purchased by the North Harris Trust, a development trust, on behalf of the local community. In April 2006 the Trust hosted the Highlands and Islands Community Energy Company conference "Community Energy: Leading from the Edge" in Tarbert. In early 2008 the Trust received planning consent for three 86 metre (282 ft) wind turbines to be located at Monan. In 2008 Mike Russell, the Scottish environment minister announced that the North Harris Trust had begun canvassing local opinion about a proposal to create Scotland's third national park in the area.

=== South Harris ===
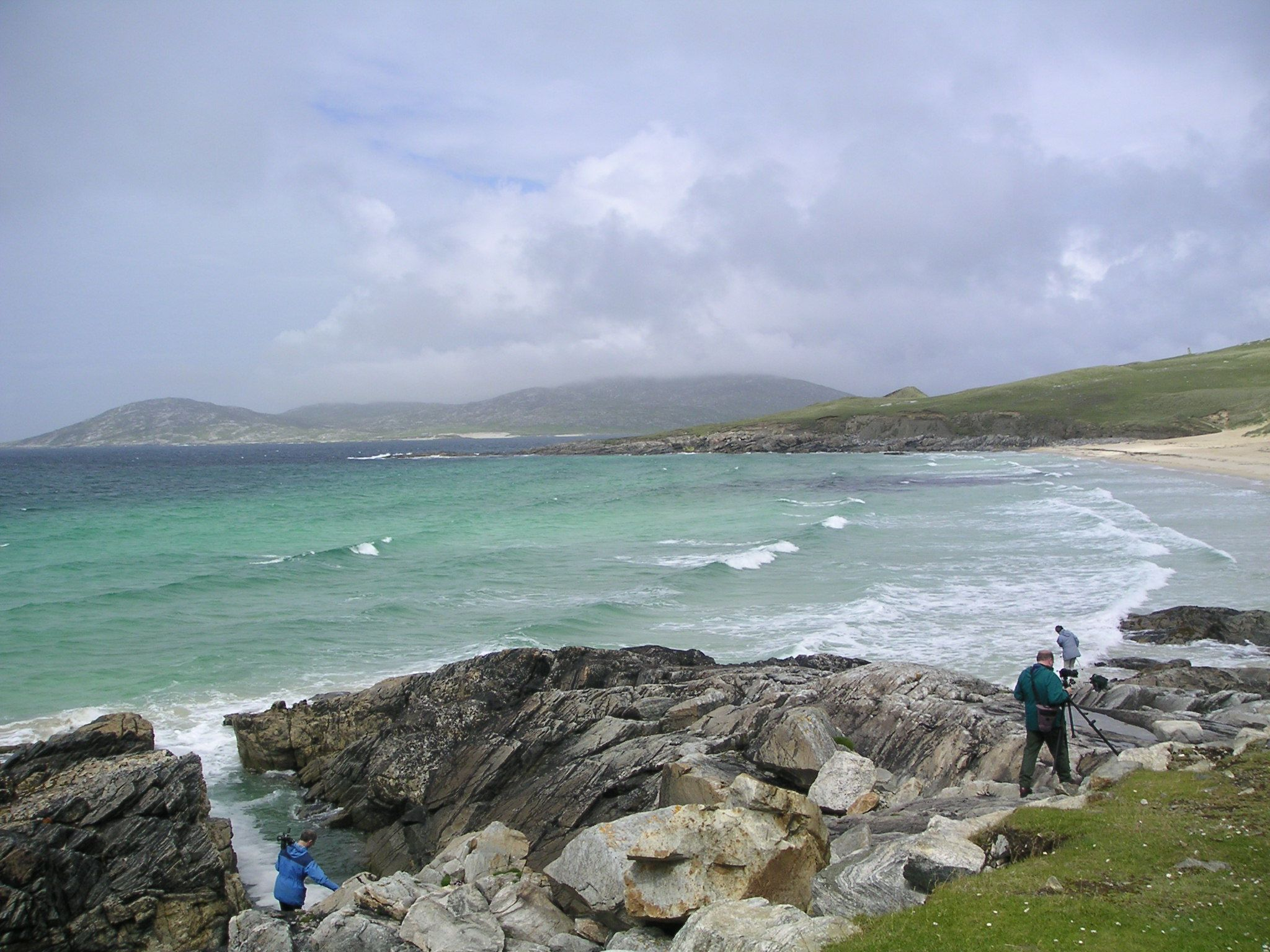
South Harris

The southern part of Harris is less mountainous, with numerous unspoilt, white sandy beaches on the west coast. Its main settlements are Rodel (Roghadal), known for its medieval kirk of St. Clement (Eaglais Chliamhain), the most elaborate surviving medieval church in the Hebrides after Iona Abbey, and Leverburgh (An Tòb na Hearadh or An t-Òb na Hearadh). A ferry sails from the latter to Berneray (Beàrnaraigh na Hearadh), an island off the coast of North Uist (Uibhist a Tuath), to which it is joined by a causeway.

The east coast of south Harris is known as the Bays. The best-known section is called the "Golden Road" as it cost so much money to build in 1897. It runs from Miavaig via Drinishader, Grosebay, Scadabay and Cluer to Stockinish. From Stockinish the road is called the Bays and meanders through the coastal townships of Lickisto (Liceasto), Geocrab (Geòcrab), Manish (Mànais), Flodabay (Fleòideabhagh), Quidinish (Cuidhtinis), Finsbay (Fionnsbhagh) and Lingerbay (Lingreabhagh).

The beaches of Luskentyre and Scarista are amongst the most spectacular. From the former the island of Taransay, where the BBC Television series Castaway 2000 was recorded, is seen most clearly from Harris. At Scarista the beach is a venue for surfing and kite buggying. Nearby the Harris Golf Club offers well kept greens and views of the hills, but there is no play on Sundays. Scarista is the birthplace of the author Finlay J. MacDonald, who wrote about growing up on Harris in the 1930s. His books Crowdie and Cream, Crotal and White and The Corncrake and the Lysander paint a vivid and humorous picture of Hebridean life.

=== Tarbert ===
Tarbert is the main port and main settlement of Harris, with a population of about 550. The name Tarbert comes from the Gaelic tairbeart meaning "portage" or "isthmus". It is located on an isthmus between Loch Tarbert and West Loch Tarbert. The village has a ferry terminal, local tourist information and some small shops, including a Harris Tweed shop overlooking the main access road to the CalMac ferry terminal and a general grocery store. It is also home to the Harris Distillery.

=== Scalpay ===
The island of Scalpay is located at the mouth of East Loch Tarbert. It was known historically for its fishing industry, though little of that remains. The island was linked to Harris when the Scalpay Bridge was opened in 1997, connecting Scalpay to the settlement of Kyles on Harris.

Media attention has recently been drawn to angling on Harris, and Tarbert in particular. Local fishermen have been targeting large Common Skate in the area and have had prolific catches, mainly from West Loch Tarbert, in autumn and winter. There is an application for the Scottish shore record of 183 pounds (83 kg) although a fish estimated at 204 pounds (93 kg) was later landed. These catches have attracted the attention of the local and national press and sea angling's leading magazines.

== Economy and transport ==
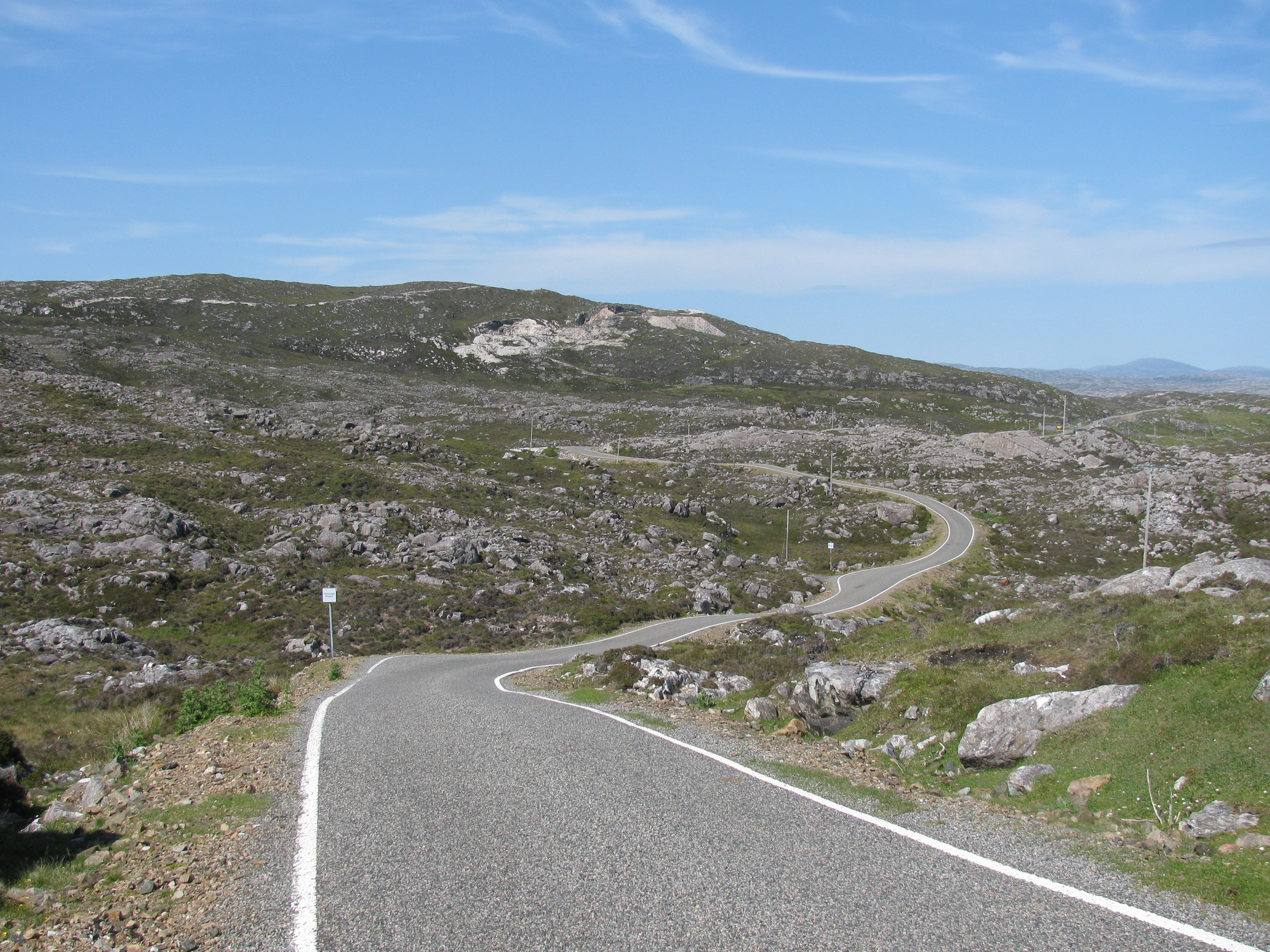
Golden Road from Rodel to Tarbet along the east coast of South Harris

In common with many parts of the Highlands and Islands, Harris has numerous single-track roads with passing places at intervals. Ferries sail from Tarbert to Uig in Skye.

According to the Scottish Government, "tourism is by far and away the mainstay industry" of the Outer Hebrides, "generating £65m in economic value for the islands, sustaining around 1000 jobs" The report adds that the "islands receive 219,000 visitors per year". The Outer Hebrides tourism bureau states that 10–15% of economic activity on the islands was made up of tourism in 2017. The agency states that the "exact split between islands is not possible" when calculating the number of visits, but "the approximate split is Lewis (45%), Uist (25%), Harris (20%), Barra (10%)".

Harris is known for Harris Tweed, although this textile is mostly made in Lewis, with the major finishing mills in Shawbost and Stornoway. Every length of cloth produced is stamped with the official Orb symbol, trademarked by the Harris Tweed Association in 1909. Harris Tweed is defined as "hand woven by the islanders at their homes in the Outer Hebrides, finished in the islands of Harris, Lewis, North Uist, Benbecula, South Uist and Barra and their several purtenances (The Outer Hebrides) and made from pure virgin wool dyed and spun in the Outer Hebrides."

Tarbert is home to the Harris distillery, which has former Monsanto CEO, Hugh Grant among its directors. In 2018, the distillery was named Scottish Gin Distillery of the year at the annual Scottish Gin Awards, and in 2020, Harris Gin was voted favourite Scottish gin in the Scottish Gin Society Consumer Choice Awards for the third year in a row.

As of 2021, the company was marketing only gin, but had started production of Hearach' single malt Scotch whisky; it would be some years before that product would be available for sale.

== Education ==
The Sir E. Scott secondary school in Tarbert serves the whole of the Isle of Harris and Scalpay. This school has a primary and secondary department and can educate up to sixth year. The school has a 21 kW photovoltaic system installed. There is also a Primary School, Leverhulme Memorial School, in Leverburgh.

== Religion ==
Harris has a largely Presbyterian population that practises sabbatarianism: all retail outlets are shut on Sunday. This area has been described as the last bastion of Reformed fundamentalism in the UK, and there was controversy in 2006 when Caledonian MacBrayne started a Sunday ferry service. However, a Sunday ferry service between Berneray (North Uist) and Leverburgh (An t-Òb) in the south of Harris has been introduced with relatively little controversy and now operates all year round. This allowed travel to Lewis and Harris by ferry on a Sunday before the Sunday ferries to Stornoway started in 2009. The North Uist end of the connection can be reached by other ferry routes that also operate on Sundays (Uig-Lochmaddy and Oban-Lochboisdale).

== Media and the arts ==
Tinted shots of parts of the island were used by Stanley Kubrick as an alien landscape in the film 2001: A Space Odyssey.

In his 1962 novel Atlantic Fury, Hammond Innes put a fictional Joint Services Guided Weapons Establishment in Northton, South Harris, where some of the action takes place.

Douglas Stuart's 2025 novel John of John takes place on Harris in the late 1990s, centering on the conflict between a young gay man coming home to his village after years of going to university in Edinburgh, and his conservative, controlling father who is the deacon of the local Presbyterian church.

The nearby island of Taransay became well known following the BBC show Castaway broadcast in 2000 and various scenes were shot on Harris itself. The film The Rocket Post was also filmed on Taransay in 2004. The film is based on the story of Gerhard Zucker, the German rocket scientist who in 1934 used the Isle of Scarp as his base for experimenting with sending mail over long distances by rocket.

The local newspaper is the Stornoway Gazette; there is also a community newspaper published fortnightly, called Dè Tha Dol?

== District tartan ==
The Isle of Harris district tartan

A group of sixth-year pupils at the Sir E. Scott secondary school in Tarbert won the 2003 Young Enterprise UK Award for their design, marketing, and selling of the Isle of Harris district tartan. The tartan is officially registered with the Scottish Tartans Authority (under number 6198) and with the Scottish Tartans World Register (under #2981). Its symmetrical threadcount is listed as "WW/8 B80 K8 LG16 K16 LB/24", with a colour palette of:

pelorous blue #2888C4,
forest green #289C18,
dark grey #101010,
wilson white #FCFCFC, and
Windsor blue #2C2C80.

== See also ==
- History of the Outer Hebrides
