= Seaforth =

Seaforth may refer to:

== Places ==
=== Australia ===
- Seaforth, New South Wales, a suburb of Sydney
- Seaforth, Queensland, a town in the Mackay Region

=== Canada ===
- Seaforth, Nova Scotia, Canada, a community
- Seaforth, Ontario, Canada, a community

=== Jamaica ===
- Seaforth, Jamaica, a settlement

=== United Kingdom ===
- Seaforth, Merseyside, England, a district

=== United States ===
- Seaforth, Minnesota, United States, a city
- Seaforth, North Carolina, United States, an unincorporated community

== Maritime ==
- Seaforth Battery, dismantled in 1928
- Seaforth Dock, on the River Mersey, England, at Seaforth, north of Liverpool
- Seaforth Island, Scotland, an uninhabited island in the Outer Hebrides
- Loch Seaforth, Scotland
- Seaforth River, New Zealand

=== Ships ===
- HMS Seaforth (1805), a Royal Navy ship, formerly the French brig Dame Ernouf
- MV Seaforth, a coaster
- MV Loch Seaforth 1947 and 2014, Stornoway ferries

== Other ==
- Seaforth (band), duo of Tom Jordan and Mitch Thompson from Australia
- Seaforth Armoury, Vancouver, British Columbia, Canada
- Seaforth House, a mansion (1813–81)
- Seaforth Country Classic, a golf tournament on the Canadian Tour
- Seaforth railway station, Western Australia
- Seaforth (TV series), a 1994 BBC mini-series set during and after the Second World War, and starring Linus Roache
- Earl of Seaforth, a title in the Scottish and Irish peerage
- Michael Seaforth, later known as Abdul Kadir (1952-2018), Guyanese politician, convicted terrorist
- Unionville Seaforths, a defunct Canadian junior ice hockey team

== See also ==
- Seaforth Highlanders, a former British Army regiment
- The Seaforth Highlanders of Canada, a Canadian Army reserve infantry established in 1910
