= Lewis and Harris =

Largest island in Scotland, part of the Outer Hebrides

Leòdhas 's na Hearadh (Gaelic)
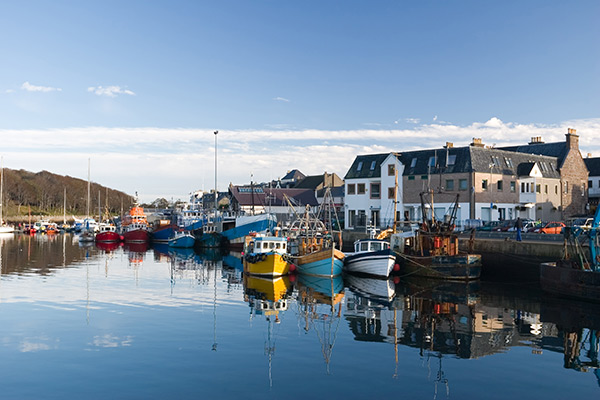
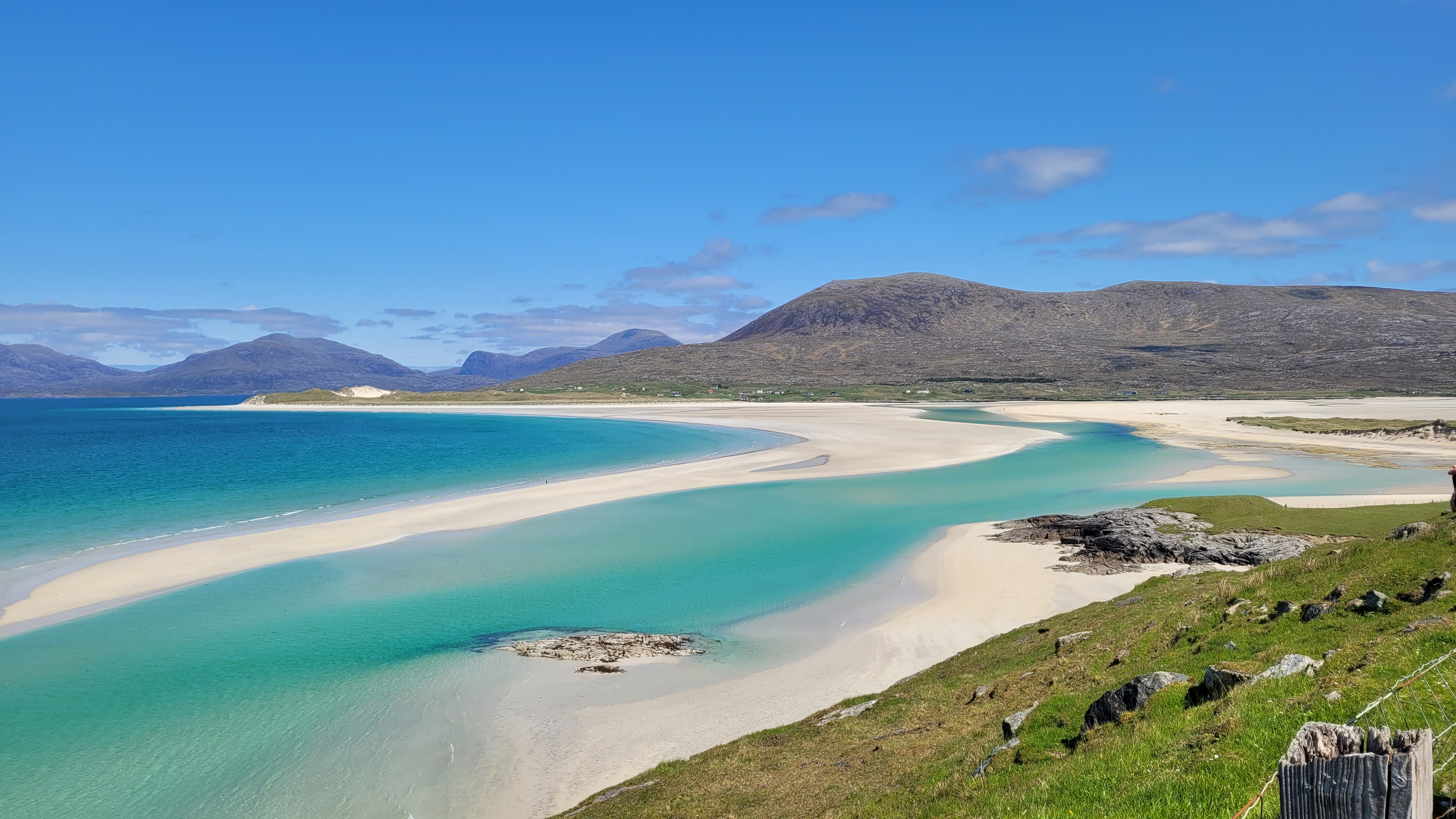
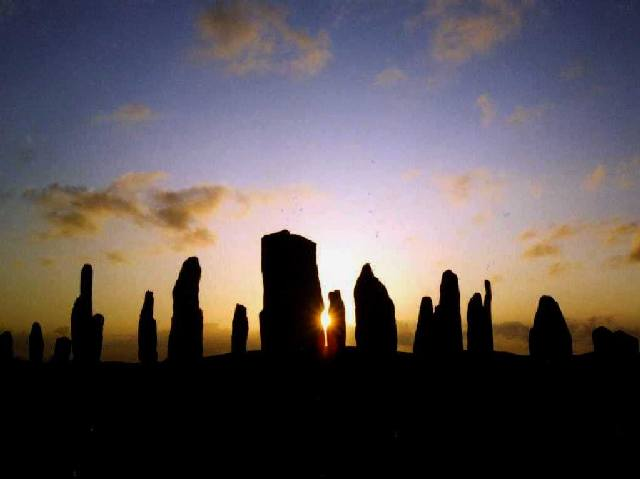
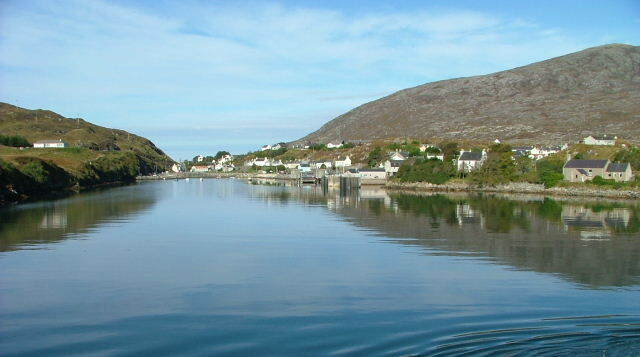
- Stornoway harbour Luskentyre, Harris Callanish stones Tarbert harbour

Location
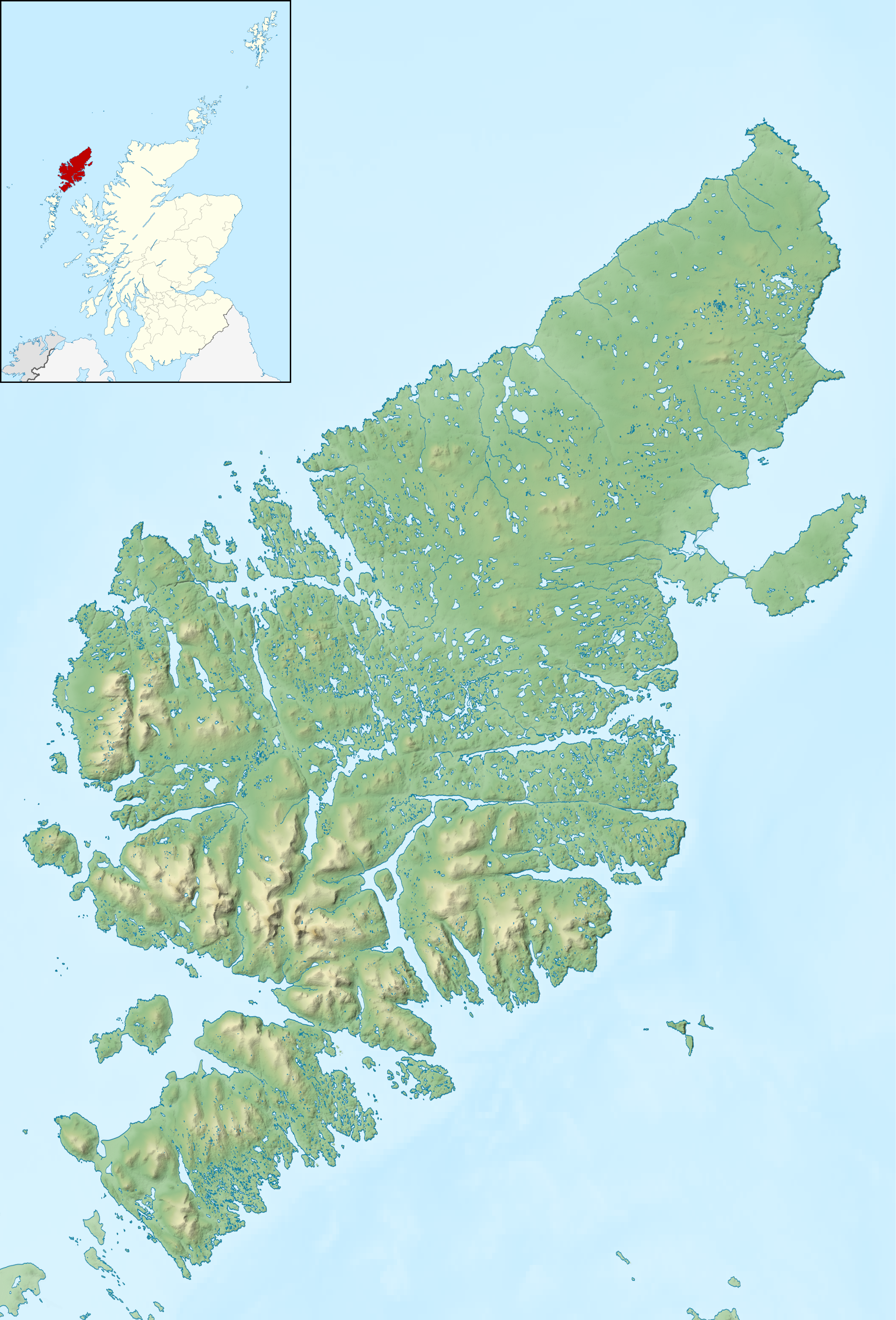
- Map of Lewis and Harris & surrounding islands Lewis and Harris within Na h-Eileanan Siar Lewis and Harris within Scotland
- OS grid reference: NB240256
- Coordinates: 58.25°N 6.667°W

Physical geography
- Island group: Outer Hebrides
- Area: 217,898 ha (841 sq mi)
- Area rank: 1
- Highest elevation: Clisham, 799 m (2,621 ft)

Administration
- Council area: Comhairle nan Eilean Siar
- Country: Scotland
- Sovereign state: United Kingdom

Demographics
- Population: 19,680
- Population rank: 1
- Population density: 9.03/km^{2} (23.4/sq mi)
- Largest settlement: Stornoway

Lewis and Harris, (Note: Scottish Gaelic: Leòdhas agus na Hearadh) or Lewis with Harris, is the largest island in Scotland. It is the main island of the Outer Hebrides, around 24 miles (39 km) from the Scottish mainland.

The island has an area of 841 square miles (2,178 km^{2}), which is approximately 1% the size of Great Britain). It is not only the largest island in Scotland but also the third largest in the British Isles, after Great Britain and Ireland.

Despite its name, Lewis and Harris is a single island divided by mountains. The northern two-thirds is called Lewis and the southern third Harris; each is referred to as if it were a separate island and there are many cultural and linguistic differences between the two.

== Name ==
The island does not have a one-word name in either English or Scottish Gaelic, and is referred to as "Lewis and Harris", "Harris and Lewis", "Lewis with Harris", "Harris with Lewis" etc. Rarely used is the collective name of "the Long Island" (Scottish Gaelic: an t-Eilean Fada), although that epithet is sometimes applied to the entire archipelago of the Outer Hebrides, including the Uist group of islands and Barra.

== Geography ==
=== Lewis–Harris boundary ===
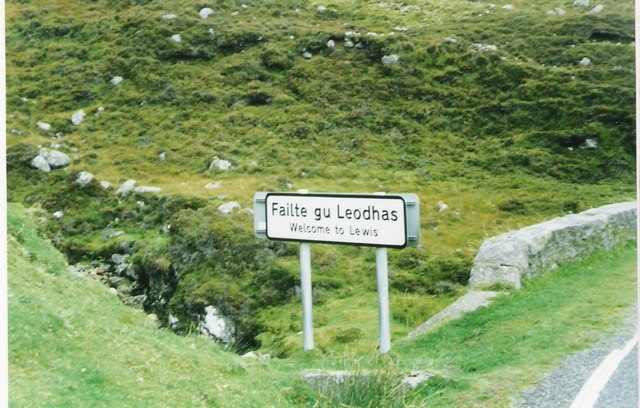
Boundary sign at Ath Linne

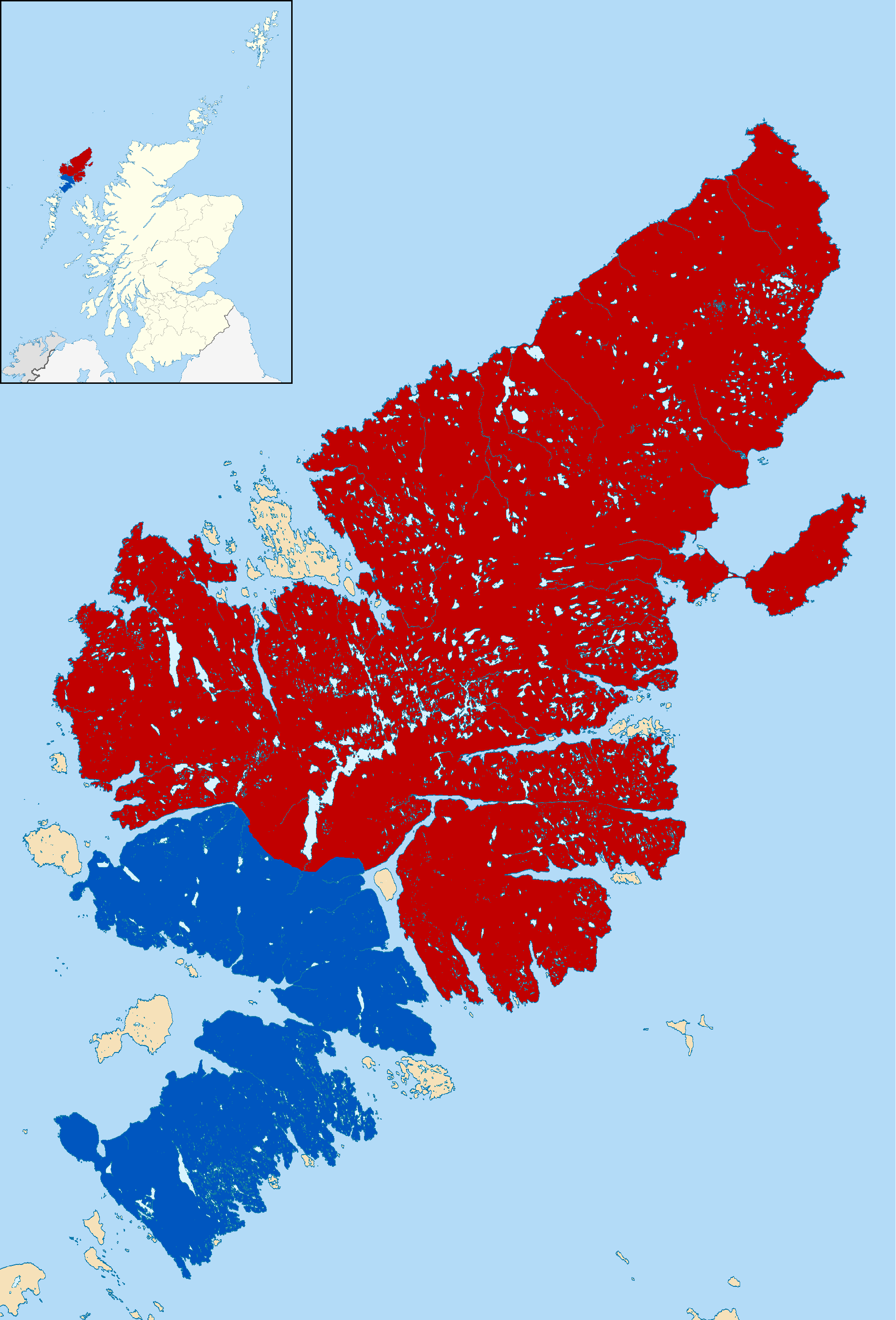
Map of Lewis and Harris with Lewis in red and Harris in blue

The boundary between Lewis and Harris runs for about six miles (ten kilometres), where the island narrows between Loch Resort (Loch Reasort, opposite Scarp) on the west and Loch Seaforth (Loch Shìophoirt) on the east This is north of the more obvious isthmus at Tarbert, which looks as though it should separate North Harris from South Harris but the North Harris Estate extends much further south. Until 1975, Lewis belonged to the county of Ross and Cromarty and Harris to Inverness-shire. In practical terms, the dividing line is more clear-cut, according to National Geographic. "In a sense, the boundary line runs from Loch Resort in the west to Loch Seaforth in the east. The road between the two dips down past the shoulder of Clisham ... until the A859 hits the coast".

The entire island group is now administered by Comhairle nan Eilean Siar, the Western Isles Council. The boundary was originally between the lands of Clan MacLeod of Harris and Clan MacLeod of Lewis, the latter selling to Colin Mackenzie, 1st Earl of Seaforth. A dispute over 3,000 hectares (7,400 acres) between Alexander Hume Macleod and Francis, Lord Seaforth (respective proprietors of Harris and Lewis) led to Court of Session inquiries in 1805 and 1850 and ended with Lord Chief Justice Campbell traversing the boundary on foot. As thus determined, it runs southeast from Loch Resort up Clàr Beag to Loch Chleistir, then east along Bealach na h-Uamha to the River Langdale, then northeast through the peaks of Tom Ruisg, Mullach a' Ruisg, and Mullach Bhìogadail, east to Amhuinn a Mhuil, and downstream to where it enters Loch Seaforth at Ath Linne under the A859, the only road connecting Lewis and Harris. Seaforth Island was considered part of both Harris and Lewis; for statistical purposes half its area was assigned to each.

=== Harris ===
Most of Harris is very hilly, with more than thirty peaks above 1,000 ft (305 m); the highest peak, Clisham, is a Corbett. It is 24 miles (39 km) from the nearest point of the mainland, from which it is separated by the Minch.

=== Lewis ===
Lewis is comparatively flat, save in the south-east, where Ben More reaches 1,874 ft (571 m), and in the south-west, where Mealasbhal 1,885 ft (575 m) is the highest point. Lewis contains the deepest lake on any offshore island in the British Isles, Loch Suaineabhat, which has a maximum depth of 66.7 m (219 ft) and an overall mean depth of 32 m (105 ft).

=== Nearby smaller islands ===
Other nearby inhabited islands in the Lewis and Harris group are Beàrnaraigh (Great Bernera) and Sgalpaigh (Scalpay). Tarasaigh (Taransay) and An Sgarp (Scarp), now uninhabited, are islands close to the shore of Harris. The Western Isles (or Outer Hebrides) also include the islands of North Uist, Benbecula and South Uist (they are three distinct islands but connected by a causeway) and Barra, just to the south of South Uist.

== Population ==
Lewis and Harris is the most populous of the Scottish islands: it had 19,680 residents in 2022, a fall of more than 6% from the 2011 census total of 21,031. Stornoway is the main town of the island, and the civil parish of Stornoway, including the town and various nearby villages, has a population of about 12,000.

== Transport links ==
Stornoway (Steòrnabhagh) has ferry links to Ullapool and air services to Benbecula, Inverness, Aberdeen, Glasgow and Edinburgh. An Tairbeart (Tarbert) is the ferry terminal in Harris with connections to Skye and North Uist. However the main ferry to North Uist uses the terminal at Leverburgh (An t-Òb).

== History ==
The lands around Stornoway were probably settled since 6000 BC and there are many monuments which show prehistoric man's presence. A Neolithic burial cairn and some evidence of Bronze Age occupation were found here. The Callanish Stones in the Loch Ròg area were erected roughly 5,000 years ago, thus dating from the late Neolithic or the early Bronze Age.

In the 9th century, Norsemen dominated the Isle; they eventually converted to Christianity. In the early 13th Century, the Nicholson family, or MacNicols, built Castle Lewis at Stornoway harbour. In 1607, Stornoway became a burgh of barony. In 1844, Sir James Matheson purchased the Island and built Lews Castle between 1847 and 1857. By 1863, the town had become a police burgh; the last remains of the Old Castle were removed.

The island is the ancestral homeland of the Highland Clan MacLeod, with those individuals on Harris being referred to as from the Clan MacLeod of Harris or MacLeod of MacLeod, and those on Lewis being referred to as from the Clan MacLeod of Lewis.

Lewis is also the ancestral home of Clan Morrison.

The Lewis chessmen is a famous collection of 12th-century chess pieces, carved from walrus ivory and mostly in the form of human figures, which were discovered in Uig in 1831.

== Economy ==
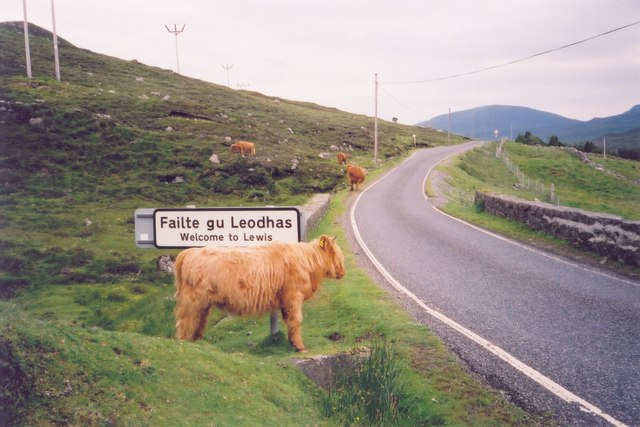
Lewis-Harris boundary sign

According to the Scottish government, "tourism is by far and away the mainstay industry" of the Outer Hebrides, "generating £65m in economic value for the islands, sustaining around 1,000 jobs" The report adds that the "islands receive 219,000 visitors per year". Tourism accounted for 10–15% of economic activity on the Outer Hebrides islands in 2017, according to the tourism bureau. The agency states that the "exact split between islands is not possible" when calculating the number of visits, but "the approximate split is Lewis (45%), Uist (25%), Harris (20%), Barra (10%)".

Some visitors to Lewis and Harris are attracted by the beaches, particularly the spectacular Luskentyre, but also Seilebost, Horgabost, Scarasta and Borve. Others come for the dramatic landscapes of Harris, to experience the Gaelic traditions or the sense of history, for example at Dun Carloway or the 5,000 year old Callanish Stones.

A major industry on the island is the production of Harris tweed fabric (Clò Mòr or Clò Hearach in Gaelic) which is made by hand on the island. It is the only commercially produced handwoven tweed in the world. To qualify as Harris tweed, the textile must be "handwoven by the islanders at their homes in the Outer Hebrides, finished in the Outer Hebrides, and made from pure virgin wool dyed and spun in the Outer Hebrides", according to a British Act of Parliament. Approximately 400 islanders were working in this industry as of late 2017. The textile is popular with celebrities and Royals.

There is only one manufacturer of Scotch whisky and gin in Isle of Harris, namely the Isle of Harris Distillery, which opened in 2019 and was working to produce The Hearach single malt. The Isle of Lewis also has one, Abhainn Dearg distillery, which was built in 2008.

Modern commercial activities centre on tourism, crofting, fishing, and weaving (including the manufacture of Harris tweed). Crofting (usually defined as small-scale food production) remains popular, with over 920 active crofters, according to a 2020 report: "with crofts ranging in size from as small as a single hectare to having access to thousands of hectares through the medium of community grazing". Crofters can apply for subsidy grants; some of these are intended to help them find other avenues to supplement their incomes.

A 2018 report stated that the fishing industry on the island primarily focused on aquaculture – fish farming. A conventional fishery still existed, "composed solely of inshore shellfish vessels targeting prawns, crabs and lobsters around the islands and throughout the Minch".

The Isle of Lewis website states that Stornoway's "economy is a mix of traditional businesses like fishing, Harris Tweed and farming, with more recent influences like Tourism, the oil industry and commerce". The sheltered harbour has been important for centuries; it was named Steering Bay by Vikings, who often visited it. A December 2020 report stated that a new deep water terminal was to be developed, the Stornoway Deep Water Terminal, using a £49 million investment. The plan included berths for cruise ships as long as 360 metres, berths for large cargo vessels, and a freight ferry berth.

The UK's largest community-owned wind farm, the 9 MW Beinn Ghrideag, a "3-turbine, 9 MW scheme", is located outside Stornoway and is operated by Point and Sandwick Trust (PST).

== In literature ==
The Lewis Trilogy of novels (The Blackhouse, The Lewis Man and The Chessmen) by Peter May is set on Lewis and Harris.

== See also ==
- List of islands of Scotland
