= Spindrift =

Spray blown from cresting waves in gales

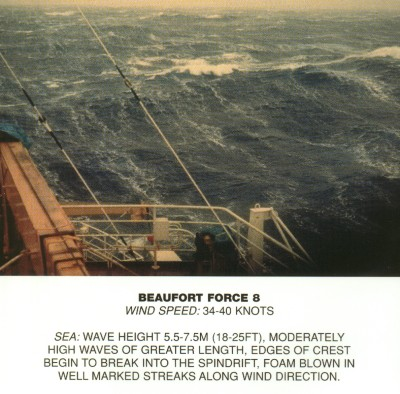
Spindrift on stormy sea

Spindrift during high winds at Luskentyre Beach, Scotland

Spindrift (rarely spoondrift) is the spray blown from cresting waves during a gale. This spray, which "drifts" in the direction of the gale, is one of the characteristics of a wind speed of 8 Beaufort and higher at sea. In Greek and Roman mythology, Leucothea was the goddess of spindrift.

== Terminology ==
Spindrift is derived from the Scots language, but its further etymology is uncertain. Although the Oxford English Dictionary suggests it is a variant of spoondrift based on the way that word was pronounced in southwest Scotland, from spoon or spoom ("to sail briskly with the wind astern, with or without sails hoisted") and drift ("a mass of matter driven or forced onward together in a body, etc., especially by wind or water"), this is doubted by the Scottish National Dictionary, because spoondrift is attested later than spindrift and it seems unlikely that the Scots spelling would have superseded the English one, and because the early use of the word in the form spenedrift by James Melville (1556–1614) is unlikely to have derived from spoondrift. In any case, spindrift was popularized in England through its use in the novels of the Scottish-born author William Black (1841–1898).

Spindrift or spoondrift is also used to refer to fine sand or snow that is blown off the ground by the wind.
