= List of shipwrecks in October 1845 =

The list of shipwrecks in October 1845 includes ships sunk, foundered, wrecked, grounded, or otherwise lost during October 1845.

== 1 October ==
List of shipwrecks: 1 October 1845
Ship	State	Description
Eliza	Prussia	The ship ran aground at the entrance to the Agger Canal, Denmark. She was on a voyage from Newport, Monmouthshire, United Kingdom to Swinemünde. She had become a wreck by 18 October.

== 2 October ==
List of shipwrecks: 2 October 1845
Ship	State	Description
Alexander	United Kingdom	The ship was driven ashore and wrecked at Memel, Prussia.
Galena	United Kingdom	The ship ran aground on the Shipwash Sand, in the North Sea off the coast of Essex. She was refloated and resumed her voyage.
G. Von Munster	Flag unknown	The ship sank off Spiekeroog, Kingdom of Hanover with the loss of all hands.
J. and W. Porritt	United Kingdom	The ship was driven ashore at Hjørring, Denmark. Her crew were rescued. She was on a voyage from Saint Petersburg, Russia to Dundee, Forfarshire.
John Melms	Sweden	The ship ran aground off "Wallo". She had become a wreck by 27 October.
Maria	United Kingdom	The ship foundered in the English Channel 6 nautical miles (11 km) south west of Portland, Dorset. Her crew were rescued by the yacht Dolphin (United Kingdom).
New Hope	United Kingdom	The ship was wrecked on Tregerun Sands, off the coast of Pembrokeshire. Her crew were rescued.
Sœmanden	Sweden	The ship was wrecked off "Hundigret". Her crew were rescued.
Speculation	(United Kingdom of Great Britain and Ireland) Isle of Man	The ship was abandoned in the Irish Sea off "Longues Point". Her crew were rescued. She was on a voyage from Castletown to Whitehaven, Cumberland.

== 3 October ==
List of shipwrecks: 3 October 1845
Ship	State	Description
Ann Kustine	Denmark	The ship was driven ashore on Læsø. She was on a voyage from Iceland to Copenhagen. She was refloated and put in to Frederikshavn.
Eaglet	United Kingdom	The schooner was driven ashore and wrecked near Hartlepool, County Durham.
Ellen	United Kingdom	The ship was driven ashore at Portsmouth, Hampshire. She was on a voyage from Quebec City, Province of Canada, British North America to Portsmouth. She was refloated.
Friends	United Kingdom	The ship, on her maiden voyage, was driven ashore and damaged at Sunderland, County Durham. She was refloated.
Gustave Edouard	France	The ship was wrecked at Mauritius with the loss of four lives. She was on a voyage from Havre de Grâce, Seine-Inférieure to Île Bourbon.
Madonna	United Kingdom	The ship caught fire and put in to Cape Town, Cape Colony, where she was scuttled. She was on a voyage from London to Ceylon. She was refloated the next day and found to be severely damaged.
Maraboo	United Kingdom	The ship was driven ashore and wrecked at Sunderland. Her crew were rescued by the Sunderland Lifeboat.
Ocean	United Kingdom	The brig ran aground on the Herd Sand, in the North Sea off the coast of County Durham. Her crew were rescued. She was on a voyage from South Shields, County Durham to London. She was refloated on 6 October and beached at North Shields. Refloated on 5 November and taken in to North Shields for repairs.
Rose	United Kingdom	The ship was driven ashore and wrecked at Sunderland. Her crew were rescued.
Three Brothers	(United Kingdom of Great Britain and Ireland) British North America	The ship was driven ashore on Green Island. She was on a voyage from St. Georges, Bay, Newfoundland to Quebec City, Province of Canada.

== 4 October ==
List of shipwrecks: 4 October 1845
Ship	State	Description
Aberfoyle	United Kingdom	The full-rigged ship was severely damaged by fire at Calcutta, India.
Amity	United Kingdom	The ship was wrecked at Stornoway, Isle of Lewis, Outer Hebrides.
Eaglet	United Kingdom	The schooner was driven ashore and wrecked at Hartlepool, County Durham.
Glengarry	United Kingdom	The ship was wrecked on the west coast of Tiree, Outer Hebrides. Her crew were rescued. She was on a voyage from Riga, Russia to Cork.
Mary Jane	(United Kingdom of Great Britain and Ireland) New South Wales	The ship was driven ashore and severely damaged in the Richmond River.
Romulus	United Kingdom	The brig capsized at Sunderland, County Durham. She was righted on 6 October.
Superior	United Kingdom	The ship collided with the steam frigate Vladimir (Imperial Russian Navy) and was abandoned in the Gulf of Finland. Her crew were rescued. She subsequently foundered 20 nautical miles (37 km) off Hogland, Russia. Superior was on a voyage from Kronstadt, Russia to Ipswich, Suffolk.
Union	United Kingdom	The brig ran aground on the South Bull, off Drogheda, County Louth. Her crew were rescued. She was on a voyage from Whitehaven, Cumberland to Dublin. She was refloated on 13 October.

== 5 October ==
List of shipwrecks: 5 October 1845
Ship	State	Description
Courieren	Sweden	The schooner was wrecked off "Bjornfelsen". Her crew were rescued. She was on a voyage from Härnosänd to Gävle.
Drie Gebroeders	flag unknown	The ship foundered in the Baltic Sea off Greifswald.
Hope	United Kingdom	The ship ran aground on the Holm Sand, in the North Sea off the coast of Suffolk and sank. Her crew were rescued. She was on a voyage from Stockton-on-Tees, County Durham to London.
Lucy and Mary	United Kingdom	The ship was driven ashore near Havre de Grâce, Seine-Inférieure, France. She was refloated.
Sincerity	United Kingdom	The ship was driven ashore near the Cannon Rock, County Down. She was on a voyage from Teignmouth, Devon to the Clyde. She was refloated and resumed her voyage.
Thomas and Elizabeth	United Kingdom	The ship was driven ashore near Havre de Grâce.
Triton	Denmark	The ship was in collision with Bertha (Prussia) off Domesnes, Norway. She consequently sank on 7 October off Helsingør with the loss of all but one of her crew. She was on a voyage from Newcastle upon Tyne, Northumberland, United Kingdom to Helsingør.
White	United Kingdom	The schooner ran aground on the West Hoyle Bank, in Liverpool Bay and was abandoned by her crew. She was on a voyage from Miramichi, New Brunswick, British North America to Liverpool, Lancashire. She was refloated and taken in to the River Dee.
Zephyr	United Kingdom	The ship ran aground on the Flytarne Reef off Gotland, Sweden. She was on a voyage from Saint Petersburg, Russia to Hull, Yorkshire. She was refloated and resumed her voyage.

== 6 October ==
List of shipwrecks: 6 October 1845
Ship	State	Description
Elizabeth	United Kingdom	The ship was driven ashore near "Newhausen" with the loss of two of her crew. All passengers were rescued.
Elizabeth	(United Kingdom of Great Britain and Ireland) British North America	The schooner was in collision with a brig and sank off Gabarus, Newfoundland. Her crew were rescued. She was on a voyage from Sydney, Nova Scotia to New York, United States.
England's Queen	United Kingdom	The ship was driven ashore at Spurn Point, Yorkshire. She was refloated but then ran aground on the Middle Sand, in the Humber and sank.
Margaret	United Kingdom	The brig was driven ashore and scuttled at Souter Point, County Durham.
Maria	Netherlands	The ship departed from Grimstad, Norway for Amsterdam, North Holland. No further trace, presumed foundered with the loss of all hands.
Prosperous	United Kingdom	The ship ran aground and sank on the Grain Spit, Kent.
Sceptre	United Kingdom	The ship ran aground on the Shipwash Sand, in the North Sea off the coast of Essex and was abandoned by her crew. She was later refloated and towed in to Harwich, Essex.
Tyro	United Kingdom	The ship was driven ashore and wrecked at Aspö, Grand Duchy of Finland. Her crew were rescued.

== 7 October ==
List of shipwrecks: 7 October 1845
Ship	State	Description
Amelie	France	The ship ran aground on the Robbenplatte. She was on a voyage form Bremerhaven to Rouen, Seine-Inférieure. She was refloated on 10 October and resumed her voyage.
Argo	United Kingdom	The ship was driven ashore at Ryde, Isle of Wight. She was on a voyage from Sunderland, County Durham to Portsmouth, Hampshire. She was refloated the next day.
Elizabeth Pond	United Kingdom	The ship was driven ashore west of Dungeness, Kent.
Fortuna	Denmark	The ship was driven ashore at "Castelspyt", near Copenhagen. She was refloated and taken in to Copenhagen for repairs.
Frederick VI	Denmark	The steamship foundered in the Baltic Sea off Møn. All on board were rescued. She was on a voyage from Flensburg, Duchy of Schleswig to Copenhagen.
Hero	United Kingdom	The brig was driven ashore near Fraserburgh, Aberdeenshire. She was on a voyage from Riga, Russia to Dundee, Forfarshire. She was refloated on 17 November and taken in to Fraserburgh.
Hope	United Kingdom	The ship was driven ashore and wrecked at Landguard Fort, Felixtowe, Suffolk. She was on a voyage from King's Lynn, Norfolk to Bangor. She was subsequently dismantled in situ.
Nil	France	The ship was driven ashore near Boulogne-sur-Mer, Pas-de-Calais. She was on a voyage from Dunkirk, Nord to "Carenton".
Ocean	United Kingdom	The ship was driven ashore near North Somercotes, Lincolnshire. She was on a voyage from Maldon, Essex to Goole, Yorkshire. She was refloated and put in to Grimsby, Lincolnshire.
Rosalie	France	The ship ran aground at Bayonne, Basses-Pyrénées. Her crew were rescued. She was on a voyage from Nantes, Loire-Inférieure to Bayonne.
Speculation	(United Kingdom of Great Britain and Ireland) Isle of Man	The ship struck the Scaranes Rocks, off Douglas and sank. Her crew were rescued.
Undaunted	United Kingdom	The ship was abandoned off Cape Finisterre, Spain. Her crew were rescued by Favourite (United Kingdom). Undaunted was on a voyage from Saldanha Bay, Cape Colony to Cork.

== 8 October ==
List of shipwrecks: 8 October 1845
Ship	State	Description
Aurora	Prussia	The ship was driven ashore and wrecked north of Aberdeen, United Kingdom. Her crew were rescued. She was on a voyage from Danzig to Aberdeen.
Hoppet	Sweden	The ship ran aground and sank off Gävle.
Jean Baptiste	United Kingdom	The barque was wrecked at Buenos Aires, Argentina. Her crew were rescued. She was on a voyage from Montevideo, Uruguay to the Rio Grande.
Louise and Emilie	Flag unknown	The ship ran aground off Saint Petersburg, Russia.
Margaret Hugg, or Mary Hugg	United States	The barque was driven ashore near San Fernando, Argentina. She was refloated on 18 October.
Minerva	Denmark	The brig was wrecked at Punta Brava, Argentina.
Odin	Norway	The ship capsized off "Koster". Her crew were rescued. She was on a voyage from Tønsberg, Duchy of Holstein to a Danish port.
Permute	United Kingdom	The ship was wrecked on the east coast of Whalsay, Shetland Islands with the loss of all hands.
Pieter	Flag unknown	The ship ran aground off Saint Petersburg.
Sta Britta	Denmark	The ship was driven ashore near Grønsund.
Tweed	United States	The brig was driven ashore on the Palmas Bank, off the coast of Argentina. She was refloated on 18 October.
Vigilant	United Kingdom	The ship was driven ashore at Kastrup, Denmark. She was on a voyage from Ventava, Courland Governorate to Newcastle upon Tyne, Northumberland. She was refloated and taken in to Copenhagen in a leaky condition.

== 9 October ==
List of shipwrecks: 9 October 1845
Ship	State	Description
Alert	United Kingdom	The ship foundered off Portrush, County Antrim. Her crew were rescued.
Anne Margaretha	Denmark	The ship was driven ashore near "Stevens". Her crew were rescued.
Britannia	United Kingdom	The brig ran aground and was damaged on the Herd Sand, in the North Sea off the coast of County Durham. She was on a voyage from London to South Shields, County Durham. She was refloated the next day and taken in to South Shields.
Brothers	United Kingdom	The ship was driven ashore at "Port St. Philip", Gibraltar. She was refloated the next day.
Caroline	Danzig	The ship struck a sunken wreck and was abandoned in the North Sea. Her crew were rescued. She was on a voyage from Danzig to Saint-Valery-sur-Somme, France.
Defence	United Kingdom	The ship struck rocks and sank in the English Channel off Folkestone, Kent.
Eliza	France	The ship was driven ashore near the "Whilllen Lighthouse", Denmark. She was on a voyage from Rouen, Seine-Inférieure to Stettin. She subsequently became a wreck.
Elizabeth	United Kingdom	The brig ran aground and was damaged on the Herd Sand. She was on a voyage from London to South Shields. She subsequently floated off and came ashore at South Shields. She was refloated on 16 October and taken in to North Shields.
Express	Bremen	The brig was wrecked on Mindanao, Spanish East Indies. Her crew were rescued. She was on a voyage from "Mazathan" to China.
Fidelity	United Kingdom	The ship was driven ashore and wrecked near "Juleboda", Sweden with the loss of three of her crew.
George and Mary	(United Kingdom of Great Britain and Ireland) Jersey	The sloop was driven ashore and wrecked at Aberdeen with the loss of a crew member. She was on a voyage from Jersey to Aberdeen.
Harmonie	Flag unknown	The ship capsized in the North Sea. Her crew were rescued.
Logie o' Buchan	United Kingdom	The schooner was driven ashore and wrecked at Aberdeen. Her crew were rescued. She was on a voyage from Newcastle upon Tyne, Northumberland to Newburgh, Aberdeenshire.
Nordenskiold	Netherlands	The ship capsized and sank at Amsterdam, North Holland.
Oscar	Sweden	The ship ran aground near Kalana, Russia, She was on a voyage from Härnosänd to Lübeck.
Prince	United Kingdom	The ship was driven ashore and wrecked on North Ronaldsay, Orkney Islands with the loss of five of her crew.
Ralph Millbank	United Kingdom	The ship was driven ashore at "Cimbritshamn", Sweden. Her crew were rescued. She was on a voyage from Königsberg, Prussia to Hull, Yorkshire.
Rubicon	United Kingdom	The ship was driven ashore on Stromsay, Orkney Islands. She was on a voyage from Arkhangelsk, Russia to London. She was later refloated.
Swift	United Kingdom	The ship sprang a leak and capsized in the Irish Sea. She was on a voyage from Cardiff, Glamorgan to Dublin. She was towed in to Milford Haven, Pembrokeshire.
Tom of Preston	United Kingdom	The schooner foundered in the Pentland Firth off Duncansby Head with the loss of all hands.
Waterloo	United Kingdom	The ship was driven ashore and damaged at Longhope, Orkney Islands. She was refloated on 14 February and resumed her voyage.

== 10 October ==
List of shipwrecks: 10 October 1845
Ship	State	Description
Aries	United Kingdom	The ship was abandoned in the North Sea. She was subsequently taken in to Leith, Lothian.
Cecilia	United Kingdom	The ship was driven ashore near "Sinkan". Her crew were rescued.
Comte de Foy	France	The ship put in to Surinam in a severely damaged condition and was abandoned. She was on a voyage from Bayonne, Basses-Pyrénées to Nantes, Loire-Inférieure.
Elizabeth	United Kingdom	The ship was wrecked on the Herd Sand, in the North Sea off the coast of County Durham.
Fearnought	United Kingdom	The ship ran aground off "Gammalsby", Öland, Sweden. Her crew were rescued.
Freedom	United Kingdom	The paddle tug ran aground and sank on the Herd Sand. She was later refloated and taken in to South Shields, County Durham.
James Lyon	United Kingdom	The ship was wrecked in Sandwich Bay, Orkney Islands. Her crew were rescued. She was on a voyage from Norway to Dublin.
Ottomar	Danzig	The schooner ran aground and sank off Hirtshals, Denmark. Her crew were rescued. She was on a voyage from Königsberg, Prussia to London, United Kingdom.
Rover	United Kingdom	The ship ran aground on the Foreness Rock, Margate, Kent. She was on a voyage from Limerick to London. She was refloated and taken in to Margate.

== 11 October ==
List of shipwrecks: 11 October 1845
Ship	State	Description
Famewand	France	The ship was driven ashore and wrecked near Royan, Charente-Maritime. All on board were rescued. She was on a voyage from Havre de Grâce, Seine-Inférieure to New Orleans, Louisiana, United States.
Heinrich	Flag unknown	The ship was wrecked near Porcola Point, Grand Duchy of Finland. Her crew were rescued. She was on a voyage from Saint Petersburg to Riga, Russia.
Kitty	United Kingdom	The ship ran aground and sank at Dunbar, Lothian.
Meden	(Russian Empire) Grand Duchy of Finland	The ship ran aground in the Drogden. She was on a voyage from Oulu to Newcastle upon Tyne, Northumberland, United Kingdom. She was refloated and put in to Copenhagen, Denmark for repairs.
Nicolai	(Russian Empire) Grand Duchy of Finland	The ship was driven ashore on Fårö, Sweden.
Nordstjern	Hamburg	The ship struck the Pearl Rock, south of Carness Point, Spain and sank. Her crew were rescued. She was on a voyage from Málaga, Spain to Hamburg.
Petrea	Flag unknown	The ship was driven ashore near "Abekas". Her crew were rescued.
Princess Victoria	(United Kingdom of Great Britain and Ireland) British North America	The steamship sank at Île aux Vaches, Province of Canada. She was later refloated and repaired.
Tamenend	United Kingdom	The ship was driven ashore in Georges's Bay, Bordeaux, Gironde, France. All on board were rescued.
Victoria	United Kingdom	The ship was in collision with another vessel in the Saint Lawrence River and was severely damaged. She put in to Miramichi, New Brunswick, British North America.
Wilhelmina	Flag unknown	The ship was abandoned in the North Sea (57°22′N 1°37′E) with the loss of two of her nine crew. Survivors were rescued by Northern Maid (United Kingdom). Wilhelmina was driven ashore and wrecked near Dragør, Denmark. She was on a voyage from Saint Petersburg to "Dezaan".
Westerwick	Sweden	The ship ran aground and was damaged on the Little Ground, off the coast of Denmark. She was on a voyage from Piteåå to Gibraltar.

== 12 October ==
List of shipwrecks: 12 October 1845
Ship	State	Description
Hoffnung	Flag unknown	The ship ran aground and was wrecked on the Seeland Reef. Her crew were rescued.
Olonetz	(Russian Empire) Grand Duchy of Finland	The ship was wrecked on Naissaar, Russia. She was on a voyage from Åland to Riga, Russia.
Penquite	United Kingdom	The ship ran aground in Tangle Bay, County Cork. Her crew were rescued.
Princess Royal	United Kingdom	The ship was abandoned in the Atlantic Ocean off Inch Island, County Donegal. She was on a voyage from Saint Andrew, New Brunswick, British North America to Cork.

== 13 October ==
List of shipwrecks: 13 October 1845
Ship	State	Description
Amazon	United Kingdom	The ship was driven ashore and wrecked on Sanday, Orkney Islands.
Brothers	(United Kingdom of Great Britain and Ireland) New South Wales	The cutter capsized in Broken Bay. Her crew were rescued. She was on a voyage from the Hunter River to Sydney.
Emma	United Kingdom	The ship ran aground on the Insand, in the North Sea off the coast of County Durham. She was refloated.
Graf Gerbard	Rostock	The schooner was wrecked at "Rensburgh". She was on a voyage from Rostock to an English port.
Great Britain	United Kingdom	The passenger ship ran aground on the Massachusetts Shoals. She was on a voyage from Liverpool, Lancashire to New York. She was refloated. Having obtained a supply of coal from the schooner David Coffin (United States), she completed her voyage.
Industry	United Kingdom	The ship was driven ashore in Dundrum Bay. Her crew were rescued. She was on a voyage from Belfast, County Antrim to Newport, Monmouthshire.
Robert Ingham	United Kingdom	The ship was driven ashore between Anapa and Taman Island, Russia. She was later refloated.
William	United Kingdom	The ship was driven ashore and wrecked at Lossiemouth, Lothian. Her three crew were rescued. She was on a voyage from Cromarty to Sunderland, County Durham or vice versa.

== 14 October ==
List of shipwrecks: 14 October 1845
Ship	State	Description
Annegina	Netherlands	The ship departed from Sunderland, County Durham, United Kingdom for "Hempen". No further trace, presumed foundered with the loss of all hands.
Artemise	United Kingdom	The ship was driven ashore in Pegwell Bay. She was refloated and resumed her voyage.
Barone Stieglitz	Netherlands	The ship was sighted off Helsingør whilst on a voyage from Saint Petersburg, Russia to Antwerp, Belgium. No further trace, presumed foundered with the loss of all hands.
City of Shiraz	United Kingdom	The ship capsized in a squall off the Isla de Negros, Spanish East Indies with the loss of 40 lives. She was on a voyage from China to Bombay, India.
Emanuel	France	The ship ran aground at Nymindegab, Denmark.
Frisia	Netherlands	The ship was sighted off Helsingør whilst on a voyage from Pillau, Prussia to Antwerp. No further trace, presumed foundered with the loss of all hands.
Guave	United Kingdom	The ship was driven ashore on the south coast of Amager, Denmark. She was on a voyage from Saint Petersburg, Russia to Perth. She was refloated on 18 October.
Hebe	Flag unknown	The ship was driven ashore near "Lussins". Her crew were rescued.
Hind	United Kingdom	The smack struck the Dicker Rock, in the English Channel off Sussex, capsized and sank.
Jessen	United Kingdom	The ship ran aground at Nymindegab.
Margaret and Jand	United Kingdom	The ship was driven ashore near Douglas, Isle of Man.
Mette	France	The ship ran aground at Nymindegab.
Rhône	France	The ship capsized off Cap de Creus, Spain. Her crew were rescued.
Sylphiden	Norway	The ship ran aground on the Flytane Reef, off the coast of Gotland, Sweden. She was on a voyage from Visby, Gotland to Bordeaux, Gironde, France. She had been refloated by 25 October and taken in to "Slitoham" in a leaky condition.

== 15 October ==
List of shipwrecks: 15 October 1845
Ship	State	Description
Duncan	United States	The ship capsized in the Atlantic Ocean. She was on a voyage from New York to Charleston, South Carolina. She was righted the next day.
Friedrich Wilhelm III	Prussia	The ship ran aground off Tromsø, Norway. She had been refloated by 22 October.
Jane	United Kingdom	The brig was driven ashore and damaged south of Sunderland, County Durham. She was refloated and put back to Sunderland.
Stag	United Kingdom	The flat was wrecked on the North Bank, in Liverpool Bay. Her crew were rescued by Sea King (United Kingdom). Stag was on a voyage from Bagillt, Flintshire to Liverpool, Lancashire.

== 16 October ==
List of shipwrecks: 16 October 1845
Ship	State	Description
Duen	Norway	The ship was driven ashore near Rørvik. She was refloated and put in to Helsingør, Denmark.
Jasses	France	The ship caught fire off "Coroque" and was scuttled. She was on a voyage from Seville, Spain to Rouen, Seine-Inférieure.
Jonge Autje	Kingdom of Hanover	The kuff capsized and sank in the North Sea. Her crew were rescued by Heinrich (Norway).
Scandinavian	United Kingdom	The ship was sighted in the Vlie whilst on a voyage from Amsterdam, North Holland to Hartlepool, County Durham. No further trace, presumed foundered in the North Sea with the loss of all hands.
Trinity Yacht	United Kingdom	The schooner ran aground on Taylor's Bank, in Liverpool Bay. She was on a voyage from Liverpool to Naples, Kingdom of the Two Sicilies. She was refloated and put back to Liverpool.
Valeria	Netherlands	The ship foundered in the North Sea 25 nautical miles (46 km) off Texel, North Holland. Her crew were rescued.

== 17 October ==
List of shipwrecks: 17 October 1845
Ship	State	Description
Albion	United Kingdom	The ship ran aground in the Hooghly River at Culpee, India and capsized. She was on a voyage from Hamburg to Calcutta, India.
Margaret	United Kingdom	The brig was driven ashore at Marsden, County Durham. She was refloated the next day.
Maria	Sweden	The ship sank at Sandhamn.
Mary Loader	United Kingdom	The ship was driven ashore and wrecked at the Mumbles, Glamorgan. Her
Vesta	Denmark	The ship was driven ashore and wrecked on Læsø. Her crew were rescued.

== 18 October ==
List of shipwrecks: 18 October 1845
Ship	State	Description
Alyda	Kingdom of Hanover	The ship departed from Hull, Yorkshire, United Kingdom for Leer. No further trace, presumed foundered with the loss of all hands.
Concord	United Kingdom	The ship was wrecked on the Shingles, off the Isle of Wight. Her crew were rescued.
Elbe Lightship	Hamburg	The lightship foundered off the mouth of the Elbe. Her crew were rescued.
John	United Kingdom	The ship was driven ashore and wrecked near the Lange Jaap lighthouse, North Holland, Netherlands. Her crew were rescued.
Lady Harvey	United Kingdom	The ship was driven ashore on Texel, North Holland. She was refloated and taken in to the Nieuw Diep.
Orus	Russia	The snow was wrecked on Sandhammeren. Her crew survived.
Thomas Tattershall	United Kingdom	The ship departed from Stromness, Orkney Islands for Hayle, Cornwall. No further trace, presumed foundered with the loss of all hands.

== 19 October ==
List of shipwrecks: 19 October 1845
Ship	State	Description
Agnete	Denmark	The ship ran around off "Sanderhoe". Her crew were rescued.
Britannia	United Kingdom	The schooner was driven ashore at Thurso, Caithness with the loss of a crew member. She was on a voyage from the Shetland Islands to Belfast, County Antrim.
Helen	United Kingdom	The ship ran aground at Cobh, County Cork.
Henriette	Netherlands	The ship ran aground on the Gjedser Reef and sank. Her crew were rescued. She was on a voyage from Stettin to a Dutch port.
Maria	United Kingdom	The ship was driven ashore in Sandwich Bay, Orkney Islands.

== 20 October ==
List of shipwrecks: 20 October 1845
Ship	State	Description
Ajax	Danzig	The ship was driven ashore in the Orkney Islands, United Kingdom. She was on a voyage from Danzig to Liverpool, Lancashire, United Kingdom.
Alexander	Norway	The ship was wrecked near "Kjargaero". Her crew were rescued.
Anizetta	Spain	The ship was wrecked on Barra, Outer Hebrides, United Kingdom. She was on a voyage from a Norwegian port to Bilbao.
Catherine Cecilia	Denmark	The brig ran aground off Barhöft. All on board were rescued. She was on a voyage from "Faxoe" to Copenhagen.
Charlotte	Sweden	The ship was driven ashore near Haurvig, Denmark. Her crew were rescued. She was on a voyage from Cette, Hérault, France to Helsingør and Copenhagen, then Riga, Russia.
Christine	Kingdom of Hanover	The ship was driven ashore between Neuharlingersiel and Bensersiel. She was on a voyage from Varel to Leer.
Dalston	United Kingdom	The ship ran aground off Farsund, Norway. She was refloated on 31 October.
Dee	United Kingdom	The ship was driven ashore at Bowmore, Islay. She was refloated on 5 November.
Eliza Janet	Hamburg	The ship was driven ashore and wrecked on Switha, Orkney Islands, United Kingdom. Her crew were rescued. She was on a voyage from Hamburg to Saint John's, Newfoundland, British North America.
Eva	Kingdom of Sardinia	The ship was driven ashore and wrecked on North Ronaldsay, Orkney Islands. Her crew were rescued.
Hylton	United Kingdom	The brig struck a sunken rock in Contre Sound, Orkney Islands and was damaged. She was on a voyage from Liverpool to Newcastle upon Tyne, Northumberland. She put in to Stromness, Orkney Islands.
Jessie	United Kingdom	The schooner was driven ashore on Holmes Point, Orkney Islands. She was refloated.
Jeremiah	United Kingdom	The ship was driven ashore at Liverpool, Lancashire. She was on a voyage from Liverpool to Shanghai, China.
Jeune Joseph	France	The ship ran aground at Bayonne, Basses-Pyrénées.
John and William	United Kingdom	The ship was driven ashore and wrecked at Rosehearty, Aberdeenshire with the loss of all four of her crew. She was on a voyage from Liverpool, Lancashire to Berwick upon Tweed, Northumberland.
Johns	United Kingdom	The schooner foundered in the North Sea off the Farne Islands, Northumberland with the loss of all hands. She was on a voyage from Stonehaven, Aberdeenshire to Sunderland, County Durham.
Lee	United Kingdom	The barque was driven ashore and wrecked at Cape St. Mary, Portugal. She was on a voyage from Liverpool to Buena Ventura, Republic of New Grenada.
Lisbon	United Kingdom	The ship struck rocks at Filey Bridge, Yorkshire and sank. Her crew were rescued.
Margaret and Isabella	United Kingdom	The ship was driven ashore in Widewall Bay.
Maria	United Kingdom	The ship was driven ashore in Widewall Bay. She was on a voyage from Wick, Caithness to an Irish port.
Mary	United Kingdom	The sloop sank at Hull, Yorkshire. She was refloated the next day.
Millert	United Kingdom	The ship was driven ashore in Sinclairs Bay. She was on a voyage from "Eastdale" to Nairn.
Patriot	United Kingdom	The ship was driven ashore in Widewall Bay. She was on a voyage from Wick to an Irish port.

== 21 October ==
List of shipwrecks: 21 October 1845
Ship	State	Description
Active	United Kingdom	The ship was driven ashore at Longhope, Orkney Islands. Her crew were rescued. She was on a voyage from Lochinver, Sutherland to Stirling. She was refloated on 2 November and taken in to Stromness, Orkney Islands.
Ann	United Kingdom	The brig foundered 32 nautical miles (59 km) off Lindesnes, Norway.
Anne Margaretha	Denmark	The ship was driven ashore near Fredrikshavn.
Boldon	United Kingdom	The ship was abandoned in the North Sea 80 nautical miles (150 km) off St Abbs Head, Berwickshire. Her crew were rescued by the brig New Harriet (United Kingdom). Boldon was on a voyage from Ventava, Courland Governorate to Hull, Yorkshire.
Clark	Hamburg	The ship ran aground near "Wittenberg".
Curieux	France	The ship was wrecked at Fort St. Jose, Uruguay. Her crew were rescued. She was on a voyage from Rio de Janeiro, Argentina to Montevideo, Uruguay.
David	United Kingdom	The ship was driven ashore and wrecked on the west coast of Hoy, Orkney Islands. Her crew were rescued. She was on a voyage from Riga, Russia to Liverpool, Lancashire.
Eliza and Janet	(United Kingdom of Great Britain and Ireland) British North America	The ship was driven ashore and wrecked on Switha, Orkney Islands. Her crew were rescued. She was on a voyage from Hamburg to Newfoundland.
Eliza and Nancy	United Kingdom	The ship ran aground off Hamra, Gotland, Sweden. She was on a voyage from Tenerife, Canary Islands to Saint Petersburg, Russia. She was refloated and put in to "Bergsunk" for repairs.
Erhard	Flag unknown	The ship was driven ashore 4 nautical miles (7.4 km) from Ventava, Courland Governorate. Her crew were rescued.
Frieheten	Sweden	The ship was driven ashore on Öland. She was on a voyage from Stockholm to Hull, Yorkshire, United Kingdom. She was refloated on 24 October and taken in to Kalmar for repairs.
Hesperus	Netherlands	The ship foundered in the North Sea off Spiekeroog, Kingdom of Hanover. Her crew were rescued.
Jane	United Kingdom	The ship was driven ashore in Widewall Bay, Orkney Islands. She was refloated on 11 November and resumed her voyage.
Margaret and Isabella	United Kingdom	The ship was driven ashore at Widewall.
Maria Louisa	United Kingdom	The ship was abandoned whilst on a voyage from Danzig to Dundee, Forfarshire. Her crew were rescued the next day by Cupido (Flag unknown).
Maria Morrison	United Kingdom	The ship was driven ashore at Widewall.
Mary	United Kingdom	The ship was driven ashore and wrecked on the east coast of Bornholm, Denmark. Her crew were rescued. She was on a voyage from Danzig to Helsingør, Denmark.
Mary	United Kingdom	The sloop was driven ashore and severely damaged at Longhope. Her crew were rescued. She was refloated on 2 November.
Mehala	Russia	The ship was wrecked on Memmert, Kingdom of Hanover with the loss of two of her crew.
Mercurius	Sweden	The ship was driven ashore and wrecked on the south east coast of Bornholm. Her crew were rescued. She was on a voyage from Westerwick to Kiel, Prussia.
Millert	United Kingdom	The ship was driven ashore in Sinclairs Bay. She was on a voyage from Easdale, Argyllshire to Nairn.
Never-mind-me	United Kingdom	The fishing smack was in collision with Prince (United Kingdom) and foundered in the Irish Sea 1 nautical mile (1.9 km) off Kingstown, County Dublin. Her nine crew were rescued by Prince.
Patriot	United Kingdom	The ship was driven ashore at Widewall.
Pendarves	United Kingdom	The ship was driven ashore and damaged at Port Talbot, Glamorgan. She was refloated.
Reval	Russia	The ship was lost in the "Wormsoe Islands". She was on a voyage from Riga to Reval.
Sylvanus	United Kingdom	The ship capsized and sank at Bremen.
Thomas	United Kingdom	The ship was driven ashore and wrecked at "Busuna".
Vestruen	Danzig	The ship was severely damaged in Loch Resort. She was on a voyage from Danzig to Birkenhead, Cheshire, United Kingdom. She was refloated on 14 November and towed in to Stornoway, Isle of Lewis, Outer Hebrides for repairs.
Ville de Paris	France	The ship was driven ashore and wrecked south of Katwijk, North Holland, Netherlands. Her crew were rescued. She was on a voyage from Havre de Grâce, Seine-Inférieure to Bremen.

== 22 October ==
List of shipwrecks: 22 October 1845
Ship	State	Description
Æacus	(Denmark) Duchy of Schleswig	The ship ran aground on the Kleine Vogelsand, in the North Sea. Her crew were rescued. She was on a voyage from Newport, Monmouthshire, United Kingdom to Glückstadt.
Anne Bertha	Prussia	The ship was driven ashore and wrecked on Mainland, Orkney Islands, United Kingdom.
Atalante	United Kingdom	The ship was wrecked on Texel, North Holland, Netherlands.
Cecilia or Ewer Schiff Cecilia	Flag unknown	The ship was driven ashore and wrecked at "Sudwesthorn".
Dorothea	Flag unknown	The ship was driven ashore at Tønning, Duchy of Holstein.
Duke of Wellington	United Kingdom	The ship was driven ashore near Åhus, Sweden with the loss of two of her crew.
Eendraght	Netherlands	The ship was wrecked on the Blaavand. Her crew were rescued. She was on a voyage from Larvik, Norway to Harlingen, Friesland.
Familiens Vel	Norway	The ship was lost off Memmert, Kingdom of Hanover with the loss of all hands.
Foxdale	(United Kingdom of Great Britain and Ireland) Isle of Man	The ship was driven ashore on Islay, Inner Hebrides.
Gesina	Kingdom of Hanover	The ship ran aground on the Liesand, in the North Sea off Norden.
Goede Verwachting	Flag unknown	The ship was driven ashore near Heiligenhafen, Duchy of Schleswig. She was refloated.
Handelmaatschappy	Netherlands	The ship was driven ashore and wrecked near Haurvig, Denmark. All on board were rescued.
Hesperus	Netherlands	The ship was wrecked on Spiekeroog, Kingdom of Hanover. Her crew were rescued.
Hoffnung	Kingdom of Hanover	The ship foundered off Norderney with the loss of all hands.
Ida	Netherlands	The ship was driven ashore on Texel.
Jehu	Flag unknown	The ship was near the "Wallo Light Station", Sweden.
Jeune Anne	France	The ship ran aground between Norderoog and Süderoog, Duchy of Holstein. Her crew were rescued.
Jonge Roeloff	Netherlands	The ship was abandoned in the Wadden Sea between Ameland, Friesland and Schiermonnikoog, Groningen. Her crew were rescued.
Julia	United Kingdom	The ship was driven ashore at Uig, Lewis, Outer Hebrides in a capsized condition.
Lisbon	United Kingdom	The ship ran aground and sank at Filey Bridge, Yorkshire. Her crew were rescued.
Lord Minto	Netherlands	The ship was wrecked in the Palembang River. All on board were rescued.
Margaret	United Kingdom	The screw steamer was wrecked on Memmert with the loss of nineteen lives. She was on a voyage from Hamburg to Hull, Yorkshire.
Maria Elizabeth	Denmark	The sloop was abandoned in the North Sea. Her crew were rescued by Broughton (United Kingdom). Maria Elizabeth was on a voyage from Hartlepool, County Durham, United Kingdom to a Danish port.
Olive or Olivia	Danzig	The ship was driven ashore near Hela, Prussia. She was on a voyage from Danzig to Hull. She was consequently condemned.
Portumen	Sweden	The ship was lost in the North Sea whilst on a voyage from Stockholm to Ostend, West Flanders, Belgium. Two of her crew drowned.
Regina Danae	Netherlands	The ship was wrecked on Ameland, Friesland. She was on a voyage from "Holbeck" to Amsterdam, North Holland.
Schipman	Kingdom of Hanover	The ship was wrecked on Heligoland. Her crew were rescued. She was on a voyage from Norway to Papenburg.
St. John	United States	The ship was driven ashore and wrecked at Gaspé, Province of Canada, British North America.
Tholkea	Kingdom of Hanover	The ship was wrecked on Heligoland. Her crew were rescued. She was on a voyage from Norway to Accumersiel.
United Friends	United Kingdom	The ship was wrecked on the Norderdeich, in the North Sea.
Vrow Gezina	Kingdom of Hanover	The ship was wrecked on Heligoland. Her crew were rescued. She was on a voyage from Norway to Leer.
29th July 1845	United Kingdom	The ship was driven ashore on Amrum, Duchy of Holstein.

== 23 October ==
List of shipwrecks: 23 October 1845
Ship	State	Description
Alexander	Norway	The ship was wrecked near "Kjargaade", Denmark. Her crew were rescued. She was on a voyage from London, United Kingdom to Fredrikstad.
Algonquin	United Kingdom	The ship was wrecked near Thisted, Denmark. Her crew were rescued. She was on a voyage from Liverpool, Lancashire to Flensburg, Duchy of Holstein and Kiel, Prussia.
Atalante	Netherlands	The ship was wrecked on Texel, North Holland. She was on a voyage from Memel, Prussia to Texel.
Carl	Flag unknown	The ship was driven ashore on Neuwerk, Kingdom of Hanover.
Caroline	Norway	The ship was abandoned in the Dogger Bank with the loss of four of her crew. Survivors were rescued by Lulea (Sweden). Caroline was on a voyage from Karagerø to Le Tréport, Seine-Inférieure, France.
Castle Huntly	United Kingdom	The ship was wrecked on Lincoln's Shoal, in the Paracel Islands. Only those passengers and crew that then left on her boats survived. She was on a voyage from China to Bombay, India.
Catherina Margaretha	Flag unknown	The ship was driven ashore at Wyk auf Föhr, Duchy of Holstein.
Favoriten	United Kingdom	The ship was wrecked near Thisted. Her crew were rescued.
Hersey	United Kingdom	The ship was driven ashore derelict on Borkum, Kingdom of Hanover. She later broke up.
Hoffnung	Flag unknown	The ship was wrecked at Thisted. Her crew were rescued.
Idea	Flag unknown	The ship was driven ashore on Texel. She was on a voyage from "Frederickshall" to Saint-Valery-sur-Somme, France.
Ireby	United Kingdom	The ship was driven ashore at Belum, Kingdom of Hanover. She was on a voyage from Hamburg to Hartlepool, County Durham.
Lammerschiene	Stettin	The ship was wrecked near Thisted. Her crew were rescued. She was on a voyage from Havre de Grâce, Seine-Inférieure, France to Stettin.
Lamont	United Kingdom	The ship ran aground off Læsø, Denmark. She was on a voyage from Hull, Yorkshire to Saint Petersburg, Russia. She was refloated and put in to Helsingør for inspection.
Mary	United Kingdom	The ship was wrecked on Bornholm, Denmark. She was on a voyage from Danzig to London.
Perastina	United Kingdom	The ship ran aground in the River Mersey. She was on a voyage from Liverpool, Lancashire to Trieste.
Victoria	United States	The ship was driven ashore 30 nautical miles (56 km) south of Cape Henry, Virginia and was abandoned. She was on a voyage from Batavia, Netherlands East Indies to New York.

== 24 October ==
List of shipwrecks: 24 October 1845
Ship	State	Description
Arethusa	United Kingdom	The ship was driven ashore and wrecked at Riga, Russian Empire.
British Union	United Kingdom	The ship was driven ashore and wrecked at Riga.
Cambridge	United Kingdom	The ship capsized in a hurricane with the loss of six lives. Survivors were rescued on 28 October by Venilia (United Kingdom). Cambridge was on a voyage from British Honduras to London.
Dibdin	Russia	The ship was driven ashore at Riga.
Galatea, or Gladiator	United Kingdom	The ship ran aground on the Whitby Rock. She was refloated and put in to North Shields, County Durham in a leaky condition.
Geerdine	Denmark	The ship ran aground on the Blaavand. Her crew were rescued. She was on a voyage from Great Yarmouth, Norfolk, United Kingdom to Odense.
Georgiana	United Kingdom	The ship ran aground and was damaged at Rio de Janeiro, Brazil. She was on a voyage form Rio de Janeiro to a port in Paraguay and then Valparaíso, Chile. She was refloated and put back to Rio de Janeiro.
Partumnus	Flag unknown	The ship was wrecked at Thisted, Denmark with the loss of two of her crew.
Rubicon	United Kingdom	The ship was driven ashore and wrecked on Eday, Orkney Islands.
Salacia	United Kingdom	The ship was driven ashore at St. Margaret's Hope, Orkney Islands. She was on a voyage from Saint Petersburg, Russia to Galway. She was refloated on 7 November.
Saucy Jack	United Kingdom	The ship struck a sunken wreck and was beached at Kronstadt, Russia. She was on a voyage from Inverkeithing, Fife to Kronstadt. She was later refloated and taken in to port.
St. Felix	Sweden	The ship was driven ashore on Öland. She was on a voyage from Stockholm to Kiel, Prussia.
Uncertain	United Kingdom	The ship was driven ashore at Riga.
United Friends	United Kingdom	The ship was wrecked off Norden, Kingdom of Hanover.

== 25 October ==
List of shipwrecks: 25 October 1845
Ship	State	Description
Ellen Gillman	United Kingdom	The ship was driven ashore at Dungeness, Kent. She was refloated and resumed her voyage to Cádiz, Spain.
Errichette	Kingdom of the Two Sicilies	The ship ran aground in the River Mersey. She was on a voyage from Liverpool, Lancashire, United Kingdom to Naples. She was refloated.
Foxdale	(United Kingdom of Great Britain and Ireland) Isle of Man	The ship was driven ashore on Jurby Point. She was on a voyage from Liverpool to Peel.
Harrison	United Kingdom	The ship was abandoned in the Grand Banks of Newfoundland. Her 22 passengers and crew were rescued by Helen (United Kingdom).
Lotus	United Kingdom	The ship was driven ashore at Dungeness. She was refloated and resumed her voyage to Saint Kitts.
Mary	United Kingdom	The ship was wrecked near Bornholm, Denmark. Her crew survived. She was on a voyage from Danzig to London.
Nelson	Prussia	The schooner was driven ashore and wrecked at Urla, Ottoman Empire. Her crew were rescued. She was on a voyage from Smyrna to Amsterdam, North Holland, Netherlands.

== 26 October ==
List of shipwrecks: 26 October 1845
Ship	State	Description
Acklam	United Kingdom	The ship was wrecked at Ventava, Courland Governorate. Her crew were rescued. She was on a voyage from Copenhagen, Denmark to Ventspils.
Lee	United Kingdom	The barque was wrecked on Culatra Island, Portugal. Her crew were rescued .
Nervion	Spain	The ship was driven ashore on Borkum, Kingdom of Hanover.
Tugende	Prussia	The ship was driven ashore and wrecked at Stolp. She was on a voyage from Newcastle upon Tyne, Northumberland, United Kingdom to Rügenwalde.

== 27 October ==
List of shipwrecks: 27 October 1845
Ship	State	Description
Alida Jkina	Flag unknown	The ship capsized and sank south of Fosnes, Norway with the loss of all but one of her crew.
Ceres	Sweden	The ship was driven ashore south of Gävle. All on board were rescued. She was on a voyage from Gävle to New York, United States.
Gunder	(United Kingdom of Great Britain and Ireland) British North America	The ship was wrecked on the Little Hope, off Liverpool, Nova Scotia. Her crew were rescued. She was on a voyage from Boston, Massachusetts, United States to Halifax, Nova Scotia.
Hoffnung	Stettin	The ship was driven ashore and wrecked at Pillau, Prussia. Her crew were rescued. She was on a voyage from Stettin to Memel.
Free Iona	Sweden	The ship was driven ashore at "Westergam", Gotland.
Janet	United Kingdom	The ship capsized off Skagen, Denmark with the loss of all but one of her crew. She was on a voyage from Nakskov, Denmark to London.
Johannes Eusshom	Sweden	The ship was driven ashore at "Westergam".
Lord Wenlock	United Kingdom	The ship was driven ashore and wrecked on Stronskar, Russia. She was on a voyage from London to Saint Petersburg, Russia.
Maria	United Kingdom	The ship was driven ashore at Carson Point, County Wexford. She was on a voyage from Newport, Monmouthshire to Waterford. She was refloated.
Maria	(Russian Empire) Grand Duchy of Finland	The ship was driven ashore at Helsingør, Denmark. She was on a voyage from Kristianstad, Sweden to London.
Maria	Sweden	The ship was driven ashore and wrecked at "Westergam".
Minerva	Sweden	The ship was driven ashore and wrecked at Visby.
Studen	(Russian Empire) Grand Duchy of Finland	The schooner was driven ashore at Burgsvik, Gotland. She was on a voyage from "Waldemarswick" to Newstadt.

== 28 October ==
List of shipwrecks: 28 October 1845
Ship	State	Description
Achilles	Prussia	The ship was driven ashore at Memel.
Ann	United Kingdom	The ship ran aground at Maryport, Cumberland. She capsized the next day and was wrecked.
Ann	United Kingdom	The ship ran aground off Domesnes, Norway and was wrecked. Her crew were rescued.
Ann and Jane	United Kingdom	The ship was in collision with Edward (United Kingdom) and was abandoned in the North Sea off Cromer, Norfolk. Her crew were rescued. She was on a voyage from London to Scarborough, Yorkshire.
Archibald	United Kingdom	The ship ran aground at Memel.
Broder or Tre Brodre	Sweden	The ship was driven ashore at Helsingborg. She was on a voyage from Copenhagen, Denmark to Lysekil.
Catherine	Flag unknown	The derelict ship was driven ashore near Wremen.
Earl	Flag unknown	The ship was driven ashore on Neuwark. She was on a voyage from Bordeaux, Gironde, France to Hamburg. She was later refloated.
Era	United Kingdom	The ship was wrecked on North Ronaldsay, Orkney Islands. Her crew were rescued.
Janet	United Kingdom	The schooner was wrecked off Skagen, Denmark with the loss of all but one of her crew. The survivor was rescued by the yacht Svendborg (flag unknown).
Johanna	Prussia	The ship was wrecked off "Karkelbeck". She was on a voyage from Pillau to Memel.
Margaret Boyle	United Kingdom	The ship ran aground on the Sommers Bank, in the Gulf of Finland. She was on a voyage from Saint Petersburg, Russia to Leith, Lothian.
Maria	Norway	The ship was driven ashore near Dragør. She was on a voyage from Christiansand to London.
Paraquay	United Kingdom	The ship was driven ashore at Memel. She was on a voyage from Memel to London.
Swan	United Kingdom	The schooner was wrecked at Cape Spry, Nova Scotia, British North America. Her crew were rescued.

== 29 October ==
List of shipwrecks: 29 October 1845
Ship	State	Description
Acaster	United Kingdom	The ship was wrecked in Kirkcomer Bay with the loss of two of her crew. She was on a voyage from Whitehaven, Cumberland to a Scottish port.
Ann	United Kingdom	The ship ran aground and capsized at Maryport, Cumberland. She was severely damaged.
Flora	United Kingdom	The coaster was wrecked in Kirkcomer Bay. Her crew were rescued. She was on a voyage from Whitehaven to a Scottish port.
Iduna	Flag unknown	The ship was wrecked on the Meulez Rock, between the Glénan Islands and the Île aux Moutons.
St. Jean	France	The ship sank off Great Yarmouth, Norfolk, United Kingdom. Her crew were rescued.
Auguste	France	The ship was wrecked at "Scatillos", Uruguay with the loss of four of her crew. She was on a voyage from Marseille, Bouches-du-Rhône to Montevideo, Uruguay.

== 30 October ==
List of shipwrecks: 30 October 1845
Ship	State	Description
Alice	Netherlands	The koff sank off "Fornas", Denmark.
Eliza Ann	United Kingdom	The ship was driven ashore and wrecked 4 nautical miles (7.4 km) downstream of Cape Chat, Province of Canada, British North America. She was on a voyage from Quebec City, Province of Canada to Cork.
Maria	(Russian Empire) Grand Duchy of Finland	The ship was driven ashore at Helsingør, Denmark.
Virginia	United States	The brig ran aground on the Gingerbread Grounds, off Bimini, Bahamas.

== 31 October ==
List of shipwrecks: 31 October 1845
Ship	State	Description
Acacus	Hamburg	The ship was wrecked on the Vogelsand, in the North Sea. She was on a voyage from Newport, Monmouthshire, United Kingdom to Hamburg.
Albert	Prussia	The ship was driven ashore and wrecked 20 nautical miles (37 km) south of Memel. She was on a voyage from Chatham, Kent, United Kingdom to Memel.
David	United Kingdom	The ship ran aground on the Whitby Rock. She was refloated the next day and resumed her voyage.
Frederika	Stralsund	The ship foundered 15 nautical miles (28 km) off Leith, Lothian, United Kingdom. Her crew were rescued by Ismene (United Kingdom).
Harforth	United Kingdom	The ship struck the Whitby Rock. She was refloated the next day and resumed her voyage.
Harrison	United Kingdom	The ship was abandoned in the Atlantic Ocean. All on board were rescued by Helen (United Kingdom).
Jane and Ann	United Kingdom	The brig was severely damaged by fire at Sunderland, County Durham.
Laurentia	flag unknown	The derelict barque was driven ashore on Saltsand.
Maria	United Kingdom	The ship ran aground at "Ballferries". She was on a voyage from Sligo to London. She was refloated the next day and proceeded to Milford Haven, Pembrokeshire for repairs.
Maria	France	The ship caught fire at Copenhagen, Denmark and was scuttled.
Semproniana	Spain	The barque was wrecked on Flores Island, Azores. Her crew were rescued.
Stuckley	United Kingdom	The ship ran aground at Bude, Cornwall. She was refloated the next day.
Vigilante	(United Kingdom of Great Britain and Ireland) British North America	The ship was driven ashore in Griffin's Cove. She was later refloated and taken in to Quebec City, Province of Canada, where she arrived on 12 November.
Virgin Lass	(United Kingdom of Great Britain and Ireland) British North America	The ship was lost with all hands. She was on a voyage from Sydney, Nova Scotia to Boston, Massachusetts, United States.

== Unknown date ==
List of shipwrecks: Unknown date in October 1845
Ship	State	Description
Alide	Netherlands	The kuff foundered off "Foonas", Denmark before 30 October. She was on a voyage from Hull, Yorkshire, United Kingdom to Leer, Kingdom of Hanover.
Ameron	United Kingdom	The ship collided with Wellington (United Kingdom) in the Atlantic Ocean before 10 October and was abandoned. Her crew were rescued. She was on a voyage from Saint John, New Brunswick, British North America to Dublin.
Annegina	Flag unknown	The ship foundered in the North Sea before 27 October.
Bee	United Kingdom	The ship was driven ashore on "Ranmoe" She was later refloated and taken in to Wyk auf Föhr, Duchy of Holstein, where she arrived on 23 October.
Camden	United Kingdom	The brig was wrecked in Delago Bay in late October. There were seven survivors. She was on a voyage from the Cape of Good Hope to Delago Bay.
Caroline	Stettin	The barque foundered in the North Sea off the west coast of Denmark before 17 October.
Christian	United Kingdom	The ship was driven ashore at Maryport, Cumberland. She was refloated on 6 October and taken in to Maryport.
Cito	Stettin	The schooner foundered in the Baltic Sea before 31 October. She was on a voyage from Stettin to Memel, Prussia.
Cyrus	United Kingdom	The ship was abandoned in the North Sea before 25 October. Her crew were rescued by Maria Frederika ( Danzig). Cyrus was taken in tow on that day by Rob Roy (United Kingdom but was subsequently abandoned 105 nautical miles (194 km) off Spurn Point, Yorkshire. She was later taken in to Terschelling, Friesland, Netherlands.
Dorothea Bertha	Elbing	The ship was wrecked on the Danish coast before 21 October with the loss of ten of her crew. She was on a voyage from South Shields, County Durham, United Kingdom to Elbing.
Elizabeth	Flag unknown	The ship ran aground off Dagebüll, Duchy of Holstein. She was on a voyage from "Sudwesthorn" to Hull, Yorkshire. She was refloated on 10 November.
Enigheden	Norway	The ship was abandoned in the North Sea before 25 October.
Everhard	Flag unknown	The ship foundered in the North Sea before 28 October.
Fidelity	United Kingdom	The schooner was wrecked on the Swedish coast in late October with the loss of three of her six crew. She was on a voyage from Danzig to London.
Foreningen	Netherlands	The ship foundered in the Zuyder Zee before 30 October. She was on a voyage from Danzig to Amsterdam, North Holland.
Fortuna	Norway	The galeas was abandoned in the North Sea before 27 October. She was taken in to "Blaavland", Denmark on that date.
Frederick William III	Prussia	The ship was driven ashore near Tromsø, Norway. She was refloated on 22 October.
Friede	Stettin	The ship was wrecked on the Danish coast before 21 October with the loss of a crew member. She was on a voyage from Newcastle upon Tyne, Northumberland, United Kingdom to Stettin.
Harmonie	Kingdom of Hanover	The ship was driven ashore at Sulen, Norway before 1 November. Her crew were rescued by a Norwegian vessel. She was on a voyage from Riga, Russia to Emden.
Hebe	United Kingdom	The ship was driven ashore and wrecked at Aspö, Grand Duchy of Finland before 11 October. Her crew were rescued.
Heinrich	Lübeck	The ship was wrecked on Anholt before 24 October. Her crew were rescued. She was on a voyage from Bordeaux, Gironde, France to Lübeck.
Henrice	Russia	The ship was lost between Hiiumaa and "Worms". Her crew were rescued. She was on a voyage from Saint Petersburg to Riga.
Hermanen	Flag unknown	The ship foundered in the North Sea before 22 October. Her crew were rescued by Handelmaaschappy (Netherlands).
Hope	United Kingdom	The ship was abandoned in the Atlantic Ocean before 16 October.
Imperial	United Kingdom	The smack was wrecked at Lochinver, Sutherland.
Isla	United Kingdom	The ship was driven ashore on Saaremaa, Russia. She was on a voyage from Saint Petersburg to Leith, Lothian. She was refloated and put in to Helsingør, Denmark, where she arrived on 23 October.
Johan	Flag unknown	The ship foundered in the North Sea before 28 October.
Johanna	Prussia	The ship foundered in late October. She was on a voyage from Rügenwalde to Copenhagen, Denmark.
Josephine	United Kingdom	The ship foundered in the North Sea between 18 and 28 October with the loss of all on board. She was on a voyage from Scrabster, Caithness to Newcastle upon Tyne.
Largo	United Kingdom	The ship was wrecked off the Scottish coast.
Lancer	United Kingdom	The brig was abandoned in the Atlantic Ocean before 16 October.
Laurel	United Kingdom	The barque was abandoned in the North Sea before 24 October.
Lottery	United Kingdom	The brig was driven ashore 20 nautical miles (37 km) south of Cape Henry, Virginia, United States. She was on a voyage from Jamaica to Alexandria, Egypt.
Maria Bertha	Prussia	The ship was wrecked in the Orkney Islands before 27 October.
Maria Louisa	Prussia	The schooner was abandoned in the North Sea. She was discovered by David Grant (United Kingdom) and taken in to Cuxhaven, where she arrived on 30 October.
Marianne	Flag unknown	The koff was abandoned in the North Sea off Eierland, North Holland, Netherlands before 22 October.
Matilde	Flag unknown	The brig was abandoned in the North Sea before 22 October.
Mentor	United Kingdom	The ship foundered in the North Sea before 30 October.
Minerva	Prussia	The ship was driven ashore at Punta Carretas, Uruguay before 3 October. She was on a voyage from Memel to the River Plate.
Minerva	United Kingdom	The brig was driven ashore and wrecked on Föhr, Duchy of Holstein before 23 October.
Osprey	United Kingdom	The ship foundered in the North Sea before 26 October.
Pyrus	United Kingdom	The ship was abandoned in the North Sea. Her crew were rescued by Maria Frederika ( Danzig). Pyrus was taken in to Terschelling, Friesland, Netherlands on 30 October.
Sarah	United Kingdom	The ship was wrecked on the Maplin Sand, in the North Sea off the coast of Essex. Her crew were rescued by HMRC Desmond ( Board of Customs) and two smacks.
Sceptre	United Kingdom	The brig ran aground on the Middle Sand, in the North Sea off the coast of Essex and was abandoned by her crew. She was refloated with assistance from HMRC Scout ( Board of Customs) and taken in to Harwich.
Sjofroken	Sweden	The ship was wrecked in the Adriatic Sea.
Sophia	Flag unknown	The barque was abandoned in the North Sea before 13 October.
Stanley	United Kingdom	The brig was wrecked on a reef in The Keys before 22 October. She was on a voyage from Savanilla, Republic of New Granada to Liverpool, Lancashire.
Thomas	United Kingdom	The ship was wrecked between the mouths of the Eider and Elbe. She was on a voyage from Newcastle upon Tyne to Hamburg.
Wilhelmina	Prussia	The brig was abandoned in the North Sea before 21 October with the loss of two of her crew. She was on a voyage from Memel to Leith, Lothian, United Kingdom.
Wilhelmine	Flag unknown	Captain Christensen's ship was wrecked on the Tegeler Sandbank, in the North Sea. Her crew were rescued.
Wilhelmine	Flag unknown	Captain Samson's ship was abandoned in the North Sea between Heligoland and the mouth of the Elbe. Her crew were rescued.
