= Rèinigeadal =

Coordinates: 57.918°N 6.684°W

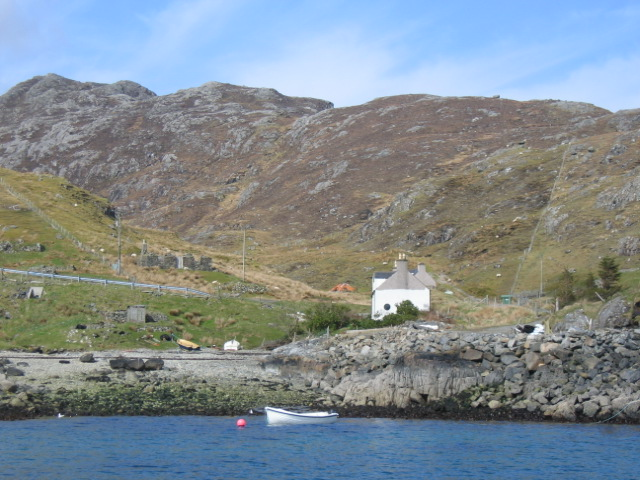
- The landing place at Rhenigidale

- Location within the Outer Hebrides
- Language: Scottish Gaelic; English
- OS grid reference: NB228018
- Civil parish: Harris
- Council area: Na h-Eileanan Siar
- Lieutenancy area: Western Isles
- Country: Scotland
- Sovereign state: United Kingdom
- Post town: ISLE OF HARRIS
- Postcode district: HS3
- Dialling code: 01859
- Police: Scotland
- Fire: Scottish
- Ambulance: Scottish
- UK Parliament: Na h-Eileanan an Iar
- Scottish Parliament: Na h-Eileanan an Iar

Rèinigeadal (or Rhenigidale) is a small settlement in Harris, in the Western Isles in Scotland. It is situated on the east coast of Harris 8 kilometres (5 miles) east of Tarbert, at the western side of the entrance to Loch Seaforth. Rèinigeadal is situated within the parish of Harris. Rèinigeadal had no road access until 1990; the only route in was 5 kilometres (3 miles) along a hill path, or by boat. The road now links to the A859.

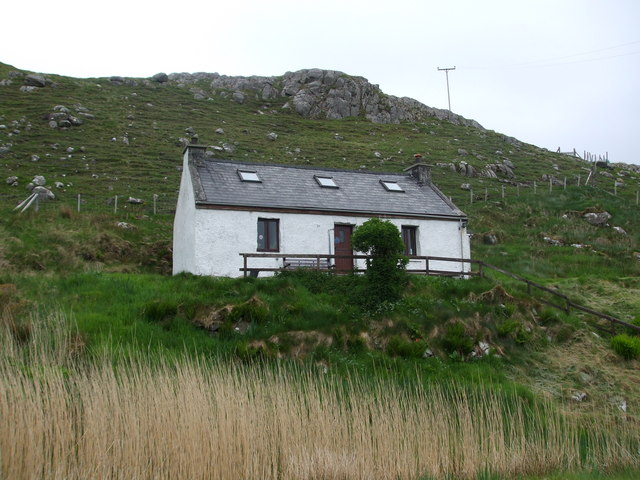
Rèinigeadal Hostel

Rèinigeadal has a youth hostel, run by the Gatliff Hebridean Hostels Trust. This opened in 1962, and was the first Gatliff hostel.

The hamlet does not have any shops, restaurants or public houses. The National Grid only started providing islanders with electricity in 1980, and the hostel only started using electricity in June 1990.

Acair Ltd. released a book on the village and the fight for the road, 'Rhenigidale - A Community's Fight for Survival', in August 2016.

Rèinigeadal boasted Britain's last single-digit telephone number (Rhenigidale 1) until converted in March 1990.

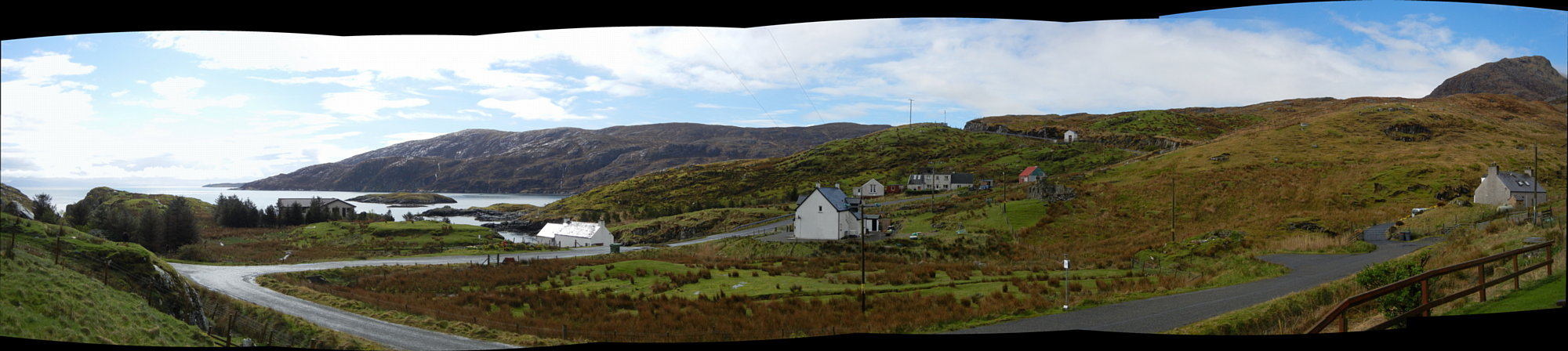
Panoramic view from the hostel
