= Seaforth Island =

Island in the Outer Hebrides, Scotland

Eilean Shìophoirt or Mulag (Gaelic)
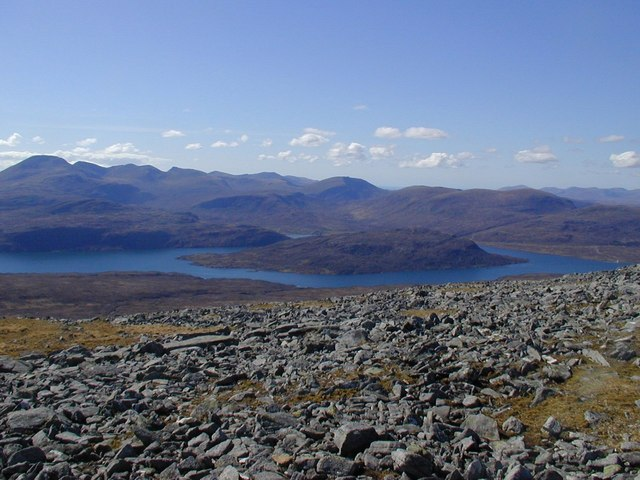
- Loch Seaforth and Eilean Shìophoirt from the north with Clisham beyond

Location
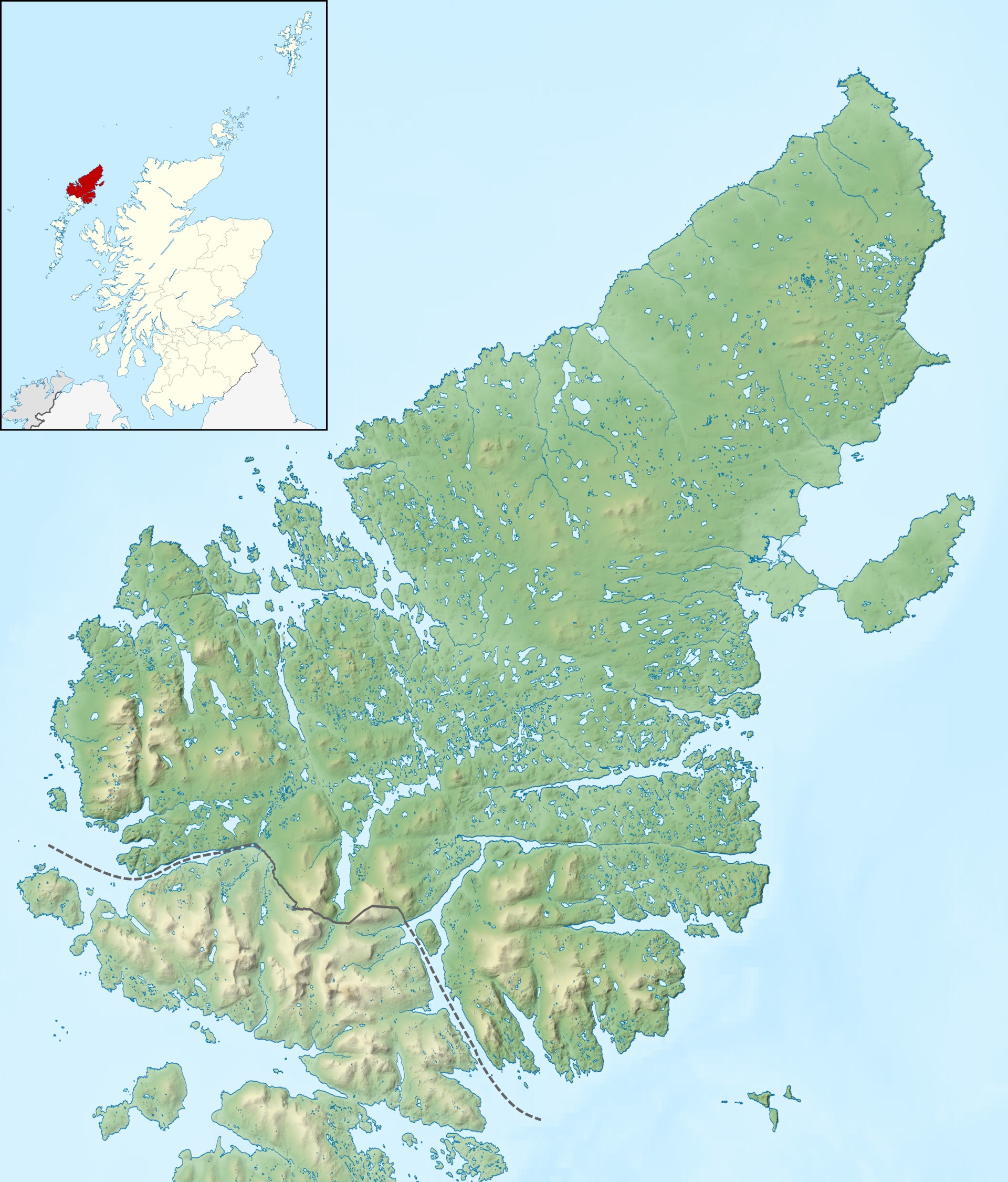
- Seaforth Island shown next to Lewis Seaforth Island shown within the Outer Hebrides
- OS grid reference: NB207111
- Coordinates: 58.00°N 06.7292°W

Name
- Name meaning: Norse for 'craggy ridge between fjords'; Gaelic for "island of Seaforth"
- Old Norse name: Múli

Physical geography
- Island group: Outer Hebrides
- Area: 273 hectares (1.05 sq mi)
- Area rank: 92
- Highest elevation: 217 metres (712 ft)

Administration
- Council area: Outer Hebrides
- Country: Scotland
- Sovereign state: United Kingdom

Demographics
- Population: 0

Seaforth Island

Highest point
- Elevation: 217 m (712 ft)
- Prominence: 217 m (712 ft)
- Listing: Marilyn

Geography
- Location: Loch Seaforth between Harris and Lewis, Scotland
- OS grid: NB207111
- Topo map: OS Landrangers 13, 14

Seaforth Island (Scottish Gaelic: Eilean Shìphoirt/Shìophoirt or Mulag) is an uninhabited island in the Outer Hebrides of Scotland. Unlike many other islands of the Outer Hebrides which are mainly surrounded by open sea, Seaforth Island lies in a narrow fjord-like sea loch named Loch Seaforth, 8 kilometres (5.0 mi) from the open waters of The Minch.

The island has poor soil which only supports rough grazing.

== History ==
There are no census records indicating inhabitation in the recent past, although the loch area was the subject of border disputes in the 19th century. In 1851 these were resolved by the unusual decision to allocate the whole of Seaforth Island to both counties, Ross-shire and Inverness-shire, which at the time controlled Lewis and Harris respectively. This situation continued until the 1975 county reorganisation.

== Gallery ==
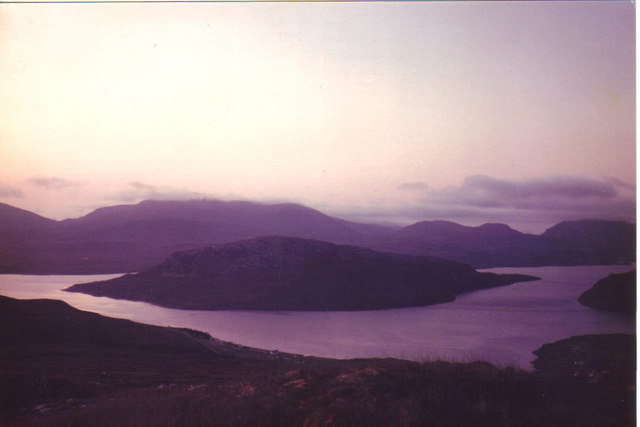
The Island from Lewis and Harris

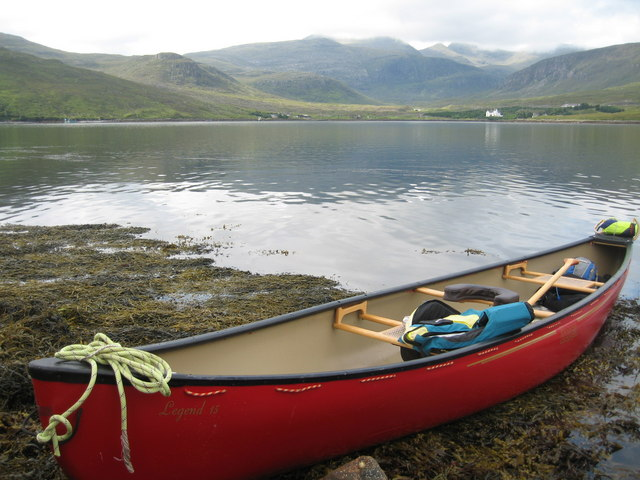
Shore of Seaforth Island
