= MV Seaforth =

Several motor ships have been called MV Seaforth. They include:

- MV Seaforth, a 5,459 GRT cargo ship launched in 1938 and sunk in 1941.
- MV Seaforth, a 518 GRT coaster launched in 1945 as Empire Seaforth, renamed Seaforth in 1947, renamed Halfaya in 1951 and last recorded in 1968.
