= Loch Resort =

Sea loch in Outer Hebrides, Scotland

- Loch Rèasort
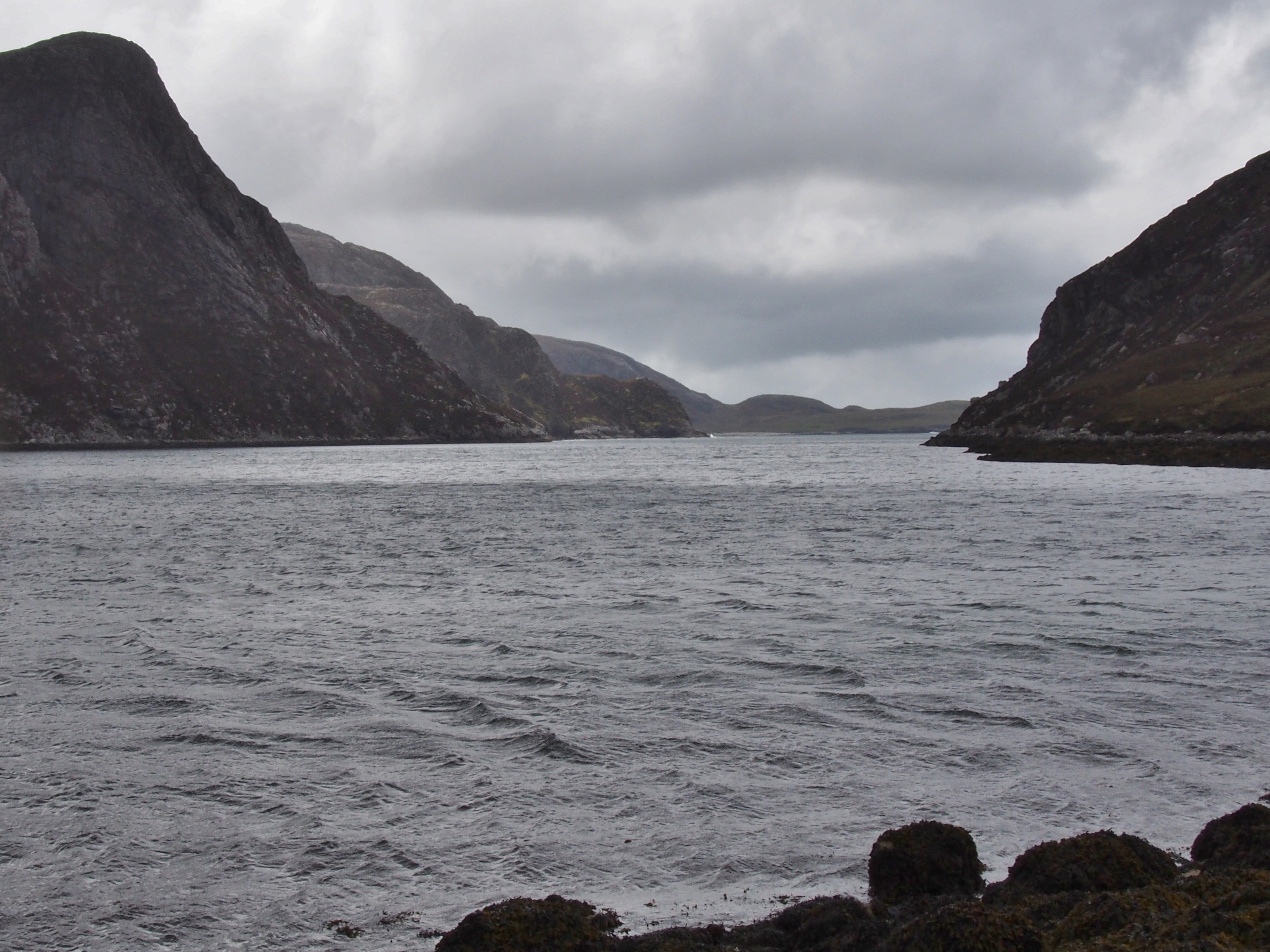
- Loch Resort from the north shore
- Location: Lewis and Harris, Outer Hebrides, Scotland
- Coordinates: 58°02′41″N 6°58′49″W
- Type: Sea loch

Location
- Interactive map of Loch Resort

Loch Resort or Loch Rèasort is a 9-kilometre-long sea loch on the west coast of the island of Lewis and Harris in the Outer Hebrides of Scotland. Its north shore forms a part of Lewis and its south shore a part of Harris. From the open sea, the loch penetrates east-northeast several kilometres into the island to Ceann Loch Reasort in a deer forest known as Morsgail Forest. The waters of the Abhainn Leatha, Abhainn Thabhsaigh (or Habhsaidh a.k.a. Ulladale River) and Abhainn Mhòr Ceann Reasoirt empty into the head of the loch here. The remains of the remote township of Dirascal cluster around the head of a shallow inlet halfway along the loch's southern shore.

The loch is developed along a fault zone within rocks of the Uig Hills-Harris Igneous Complex which date from the Palaeoproterozoic era.
