= Loch Seaforth =

Sea loch in the Outer Hebrides of Scotland

Coordinates: 57.95501°N 6.69963°W

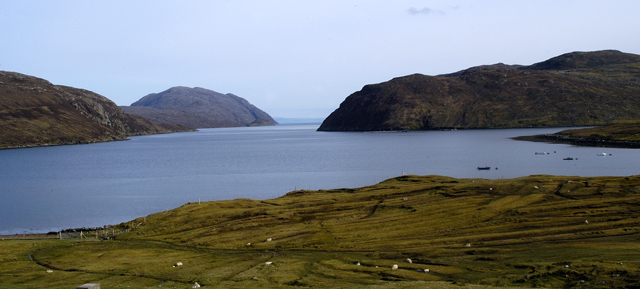

Loch Seaforth (Scottish Gaelic: Loch Shiphoirt or Shìophoirt) is a sea loch in the Outer Hebrides of Scotland. It consists of three distinct sections; the most seaward is aligned northwest–southeast, a middle section is aligned northeast–southwest and the inner and most northerly section is aligned east–west. The southern stretch of the loch seaward from Bowglass forms the boundary between Lewis and Harris and was until 1975 the boundary between the traditional counties of Ross and Cromarty and Inverness-shire. The settlement of Rhenigidale lies near the mouth of the loch whilst the settlement of Maaruig lies on Loch Maraig, an embayment on the western side of Loch Seaforth. Further settlement is found around the small bays at Ardvourlie opposite Seaforth Island which sits in the midst of the loch at the point where inland it turns towards the northeast. The crofting township of Arivruaich lies beside a further embayment known as Tob Cheann Tarabhaigh. The head of the loch is to be found 5 km further east at Ceann Shiphoirt. The loch forms the entire western coast of the relatively isolated Pairc peninsula.

MV Loch Seaforth is also the name of two Western Isles ships. The 1947 MacBrayne mailboat which linked Stornoway with Mallaig and Kyle of Lochalsh from 1947 until 1972. On 22 March 1973 she ran aground on Cleit Rock in the Sound of Gunna (between Tiree and Coll) and was subsequently scrapped. The name has been given to the new Calmac car ferry which entered service on the Ullapool to Stornoway crossing in 2015.
