= Luskentyre =

Coordinates: 57.884°N 6.944°W

Luskentyre: Scottish Gaelic: Losgaintir
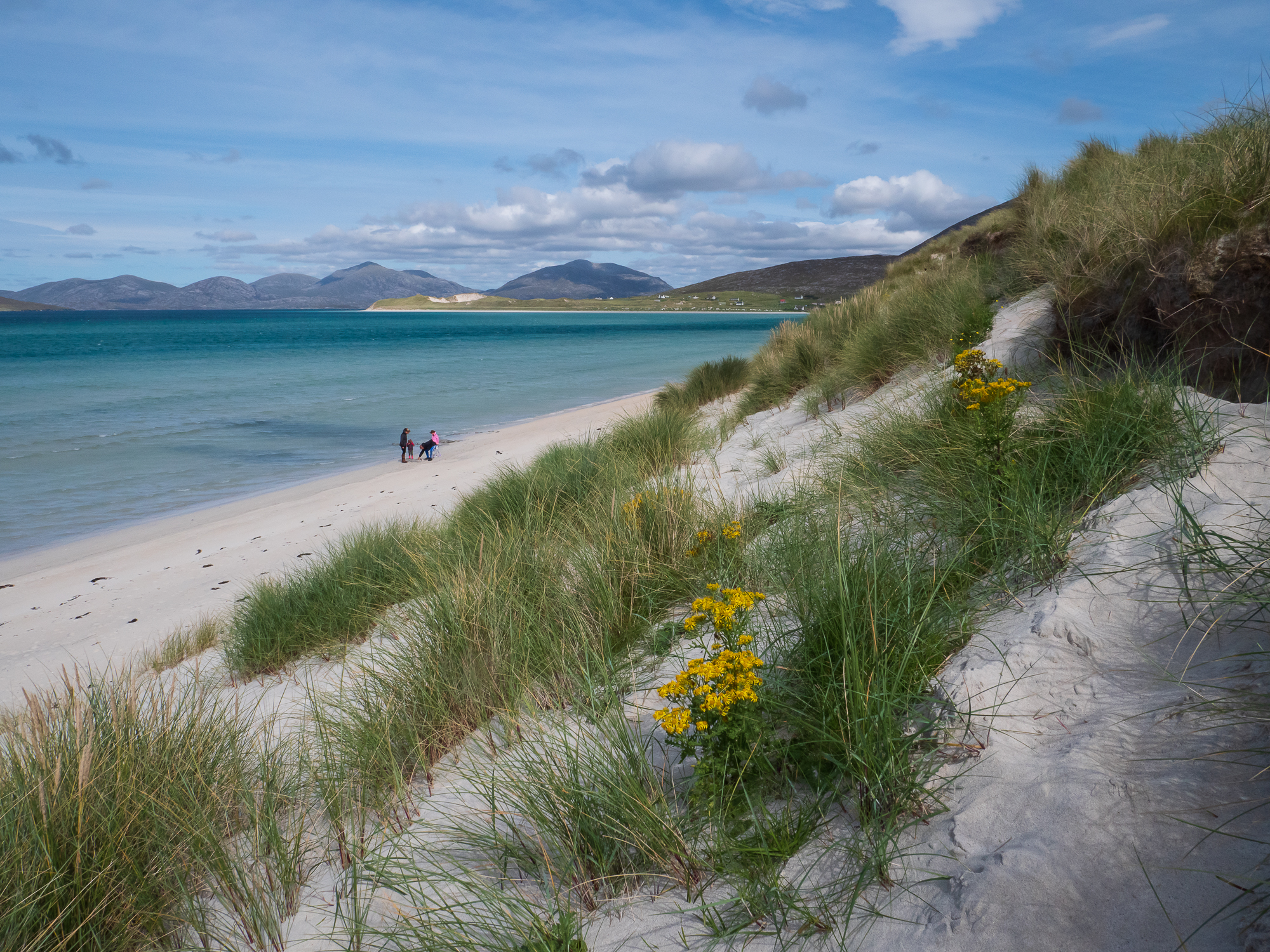
- Luskentyre Beach

- Location within the Outer Hebrides
- Language: Scottish Gaelic; English
- OS grid reference: NG070989
- Civil parish: Harris
- Council area: Na h-Eileanan Siar
- Lieutenancy area: Western Isles
- Country: Scotland
- Sovereign state: United Kingdom
- Post town: ISLE OF HARRIS
- Postcode district: HS5
- Dialling code: 01859
- Police: Scotland
- Fire: Scottish
- Ambulance: Scottish
- UK Parliament: Na h-Eileanan an Iar
- Scottish Parliament: Na h-Eileanan an Iar

Luskentyre (Scottish Gaelic: Losgaintir) is a sparse settlement on the west coast of Harris, in the Outer Hebrides, Scotland. Luskentyre is situated within the parish of Harris. The name Luskentyre derives from Lios-cinn-tir, meaning 'headland fort', although there is no trace or local knowledge of a fort at the headland. However, the headland contains the site of an old part of Luskentyre Cemetery. Luskentyre Beach has been voted Britain's best beach. Luskentyre is accessible from the A859, via a minor road.

Wildlife in the area includes the common scoter, the velvet scoter, the eider duck, the wigeon, the long-tailed duck, the red-breasted merganser, the great northern diver and the Slavonian grebe.
