= Hell's Glen =

Glen in Argyll and Bute, Scotland

Hell's Glen An Gleann Beag (Scottish Gaelic)
- Glen
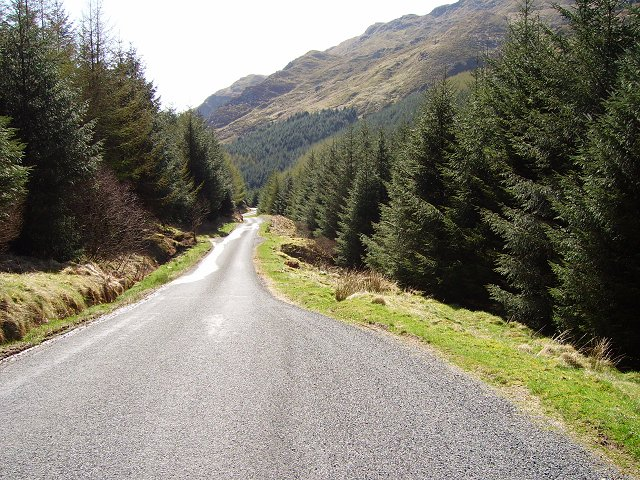
- The road through Hell's Glen is the B839.

- Location within Scotland
- Coordinates: 56.217°N 4.946°W
- Grid position: NN1820306549
- Location: Cowal, Argyll and Bute, Scotland
- Formed by: glacial erosion

Hell's Glen is a glen in Argyll and Bute, Scotland, within the Arrochar Alps. The B839 single-track road passes through the glen. To the west, the glen leads to Loch Fyne and to the east Lochgoilhead. Glen Mhor (B828) joins the glen about half way along and leads to Glen Croe at the Rest and be thankful viewpoint.

The glen is named from its name in Gaelic, Gleann Iarainn. This means "the Iron Glen" but sounds like the nearby Gleann Ifhrinn which means "the Glen of Hell." The glen is also known as An Gleann Beag, "the small glen", in Scottish Gaelic.

The glen is within the Argyll Forest Park that is itself within the Loch Lomond and The Trossachs National Park.

== Mountains ==
Mountains around the glen are:

- Ben Donich (corbett) at 847 metres (2,779 ft).
- Cruach nam Mult, (Graham) at 611 metres (2,005 ft)
- Stob na Boine Druim-fhinn, (Graham) at 658 metres (2,159 ft)

== Moses' Well ==
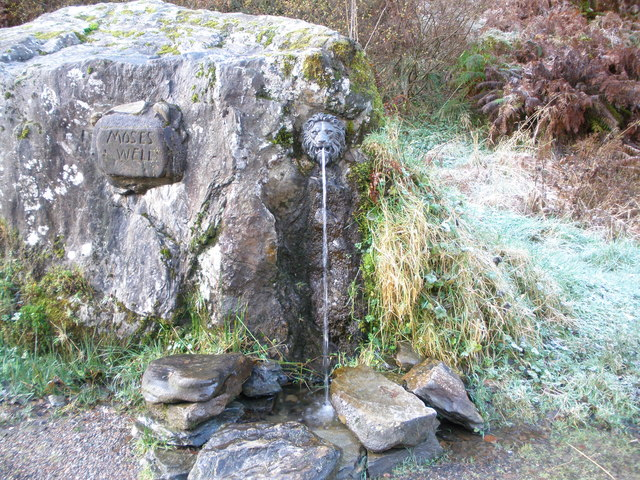
Moses' Well

In the 19th century, a local minister constructed a spring in one of the rocks which was named after the incident in Exodus:

And the LORD said unto Moses, Go on before the people, and take with thee of the elders of Israel; and thy rod, wherewith thou smotest the river, take in thine hand, and go.

Behold, I will stand before thee there upon the rock in Horeb; and thou shalt smite the rock, and there shall come water out of it, that the people may drink. And Moses did so in the sight of the elders of Israel.

Coaching horses would stop at the well to quench their thirst on their journey. Moses' Well is a well known attraction in the southwest of the glen.
