= Glen Mhor =

Glen in Argyll and Bute

- Glen
- Coordinates: 56°12′54″N 04°52′32″W
- Location: Cowal; Argyll and Bute
- Formed by: glacial erosion

Glen Mhor is a short glen located in the Arrochar Alps, within the Cowal Peninsula, Argyll and Bute, west of Scotland. The B828 goes through the glen, linking the top of Glen Croe (A83) at the Rest & be Thankful viewpoint in the east, in the west with the Hell's Glen (B839).

The glen is in both the Argyll Forest Park and the Loch Lomond and The Trossachs National Park.

== Mountains ==
The glen gives access to the following mountains of the Arrochar Alps:

- Beinn an Lochain, (Corbett) at 901 metres (2,956 ft)
- Ben Donich (Corbett) at 846 metres (2,776 ft)
- Stob an Eas (Graham) at 732 metres (2,402 ft)
- Beinn an t-Seilich, at 719 metres (2,359 ft)

The mountains are popular with both hillwalkers and climbers.

== Landslides ==
The glen was formed by glacial erosion and has repercussions today, as many areas are still unstable.

== See also ==
- Mountains and hills of Scotland
- Mixed climbing
- Scrambling
- Hillwalking
- The Countryside Code
- Scottish Outdoor Access Code
- Mountain Rescue Committee of Scotland
- Scotland's Charity Air Ambulance
- Freedom to roam
- Land Reform (Scotland) Act 2003
