= A' Chrois =

Mountain in Argyll and Bute, Scotland

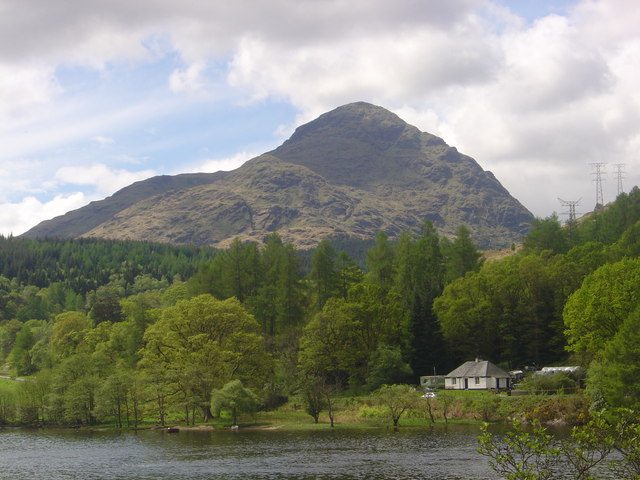

Highest point
- Elevation: 848.7 m (2,784 ft)
- Prominence: 106.8 m (350 ft)
- Coordinates: 56°13′53″N 4°45′40″W

Geography
- Location within Argyll and Bute Location within Scotland
- Location: Argyll and Bute, Scotland
- Parent range: Arrochar Alps
- OS grid: NN288077

A' Chrois is a mountain located in the Arrochar Alps north west of Arrochar in Argyll, an extremely scenic area which is technically in the highlands although it is within easy reach of the heavily populated areas of Glasgow. A' Chrois stands 2 miles (3.2 km) north-east of Arrochar at the head of Loch Long and reaches a summit elevation of 848.7 metres (2,784 ft). The mountain forms a ridge starting with Ben Arthur The Cobbler in the south by Ardgartan through Beinn Narnain to A' Chrois in the north by Glen Loin, visible to Loch Lomond. A' Chrois also provides the eastern gateway to the Arrochar Alps and can be climbed via Beinn Narnain or Succoth. It is classed as a Corbett Top of Beinn Narnain.
