= Stob an Eas =

Mountain in Scotland

Coordinates: 56°13′29″N 4°55′40″W

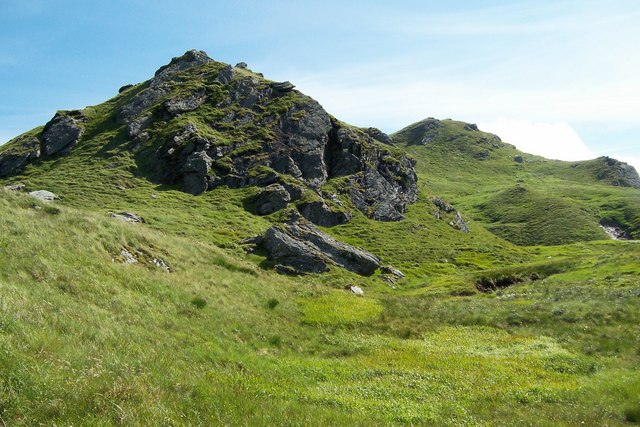
- Stob an Eas

Highest point
- Elevation: 732 m (2,402 ft)
- Prominence: 248
- Listing: Graham, Marilyn

Geography
- Location: Argyll and Bute, Scotland
- Parent range: Arrochar Alps
- OS grid: NN185073

Stob an Eas is a 2401 ft (732m) Graham in the Arrochar Alps, Argyll and Bute, Scotland.

== Geography ==
Lying above Glen Kinglas, 4 miles north of Lochgoilhead, Stob an Eas forms part of the Arrochar Alps and is the essence of remote Argyll scenery. It forms the western edge of a ridge running between the shore of Loch Fyne, south of Cairndow and Beinn an Lochain, at the head of the Rest & Be Thankful and Butterbridge at Glen Croe.

Stob an Eas is usually seen from the road north of Lochgoilhead and provides an iconic view from the village. Lochgoilhead is at the heart of remote Argyll landscape. To the south of Stob an Eas lies Glen Goil, a flat area of marshland leading to Loch Goil. Glen Goil, believed to have once been the head of the loch, is surrounded by more of the Arrochar Alps, including Ben Donich. To the south-east of Stob an Eas lies Gleann Mor, leading west to the Rest & Be Thankful. Ardgartan, on the western shore of Loch Long, forms a gateway into the Arrochar Alps through Glen Croe to the picturesque landscapes of Argyll.

To the east of Stob an Eas is the mountain's parent peak, Beinn an Lochain. Once classified as a Munro, it is now regarded as a 2956 ft Corbett. The Rest and Be Thankful and Butter Bridge are 3 miles further east. To the south west is Hell's Glen, a passage to Loch Fyne. Loch Fyne, at over 40 miles, is Scotland's longest sea loch.
