= Ben Vane =

Scottish mountain situated in the southern Highlands

- Scottish Gaelic: Beinn Mheadhain
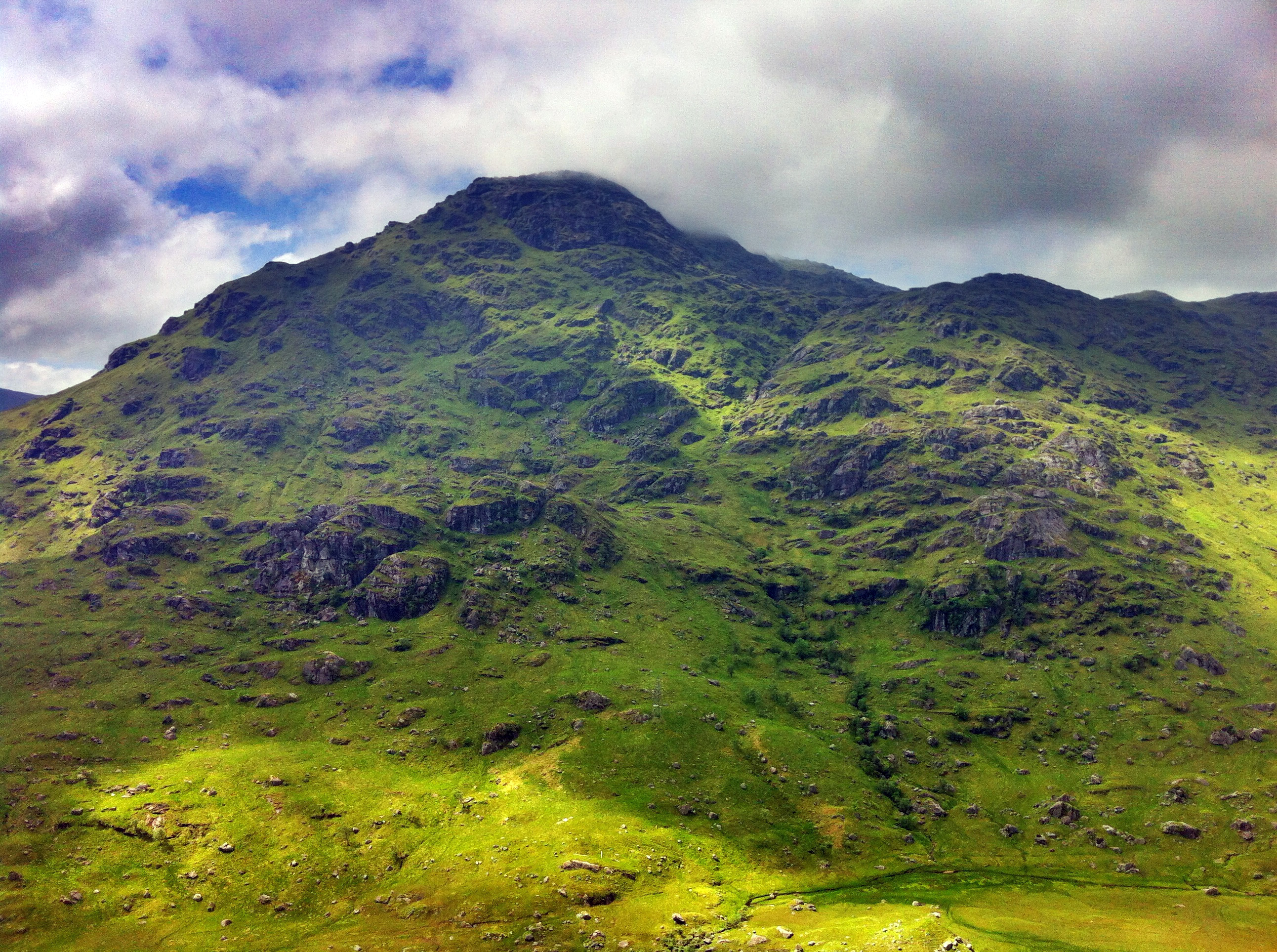
- Ben Vane seen from Ben Vorlich

Highest point
- Elevation: 915 m (3,002 ft)
- Prominence: 423 m (1,388 ft)
- Parent peak: Beinn Ìme
- Listing: Munro, Marilyn
- Coordinates: 56°14′59″N 4°46′54″W

Naming
- English translation: middle mountain
- Language of name: Gaelic
- Pronunciation: Gaelic [ə ˈveiɲ ˈviə.ɛɲ]

Geography
- Location: Arrochar Alps, Argyll, Scotland
- Parent range: Grampian Mountains
- OS grid: NN277098
- Topo map(s): OS Landranger 56; OS Explorer 364

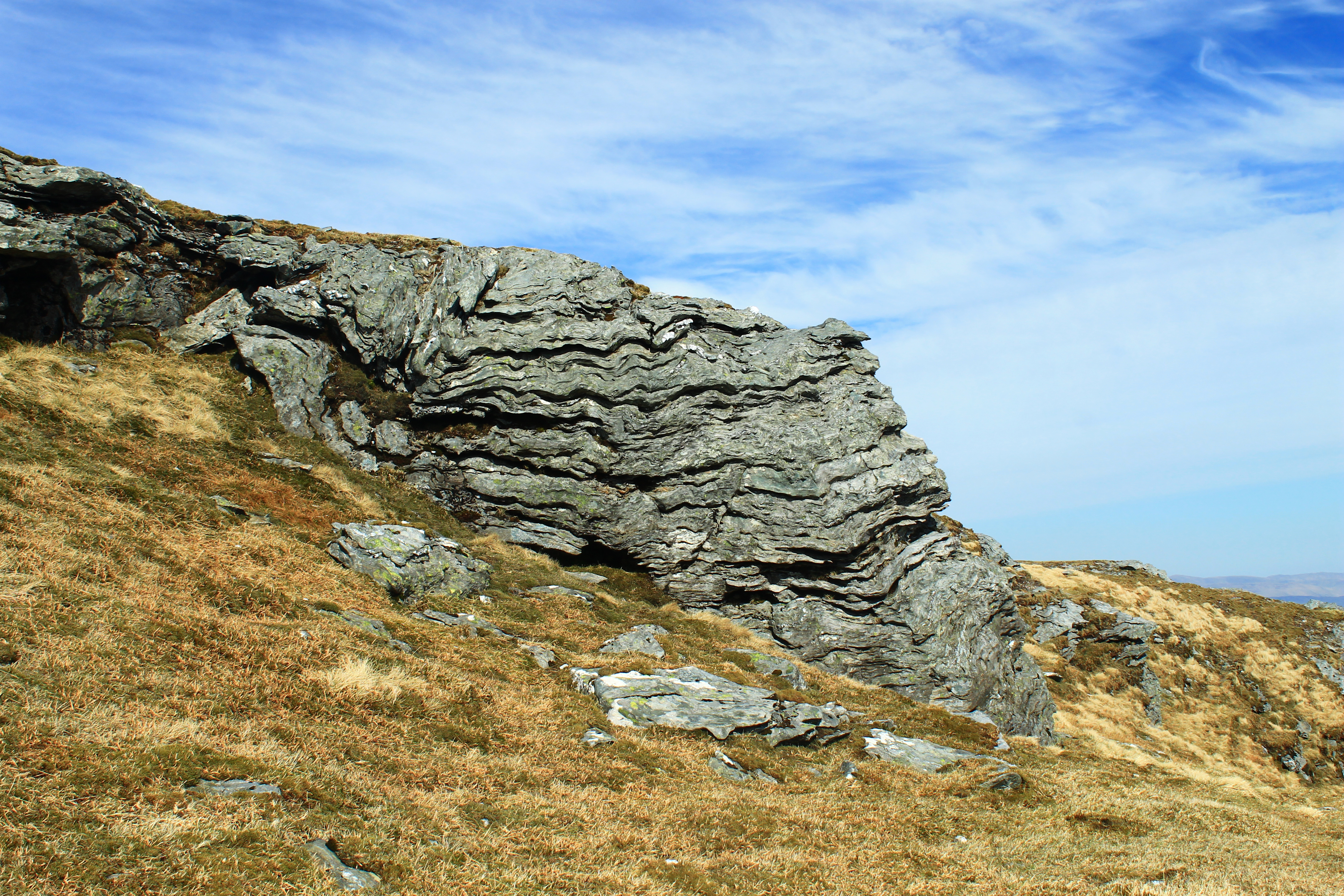
Folded schist near the summit of Ben Vane

Ben Vane (Scottish Gaelic: Beinn Mheadhain) is a mountain in the Arrochar Alps of Argyll, in the Southern Highlands of Scotland. It reaches 915 metres (3,002 ft), making it a Munro. It lies between Beinn Ìme and Ben Vorlich.

== Landscape ==
The underlying geology almost entirely comprises the Beinn Bheula Schist Formation - psammite and pelite with a Siluro-Devonian dyke prominent round the northern and eastern face. It is one of the Arrochar Alps and stands slightly separate from the other mountains of the group being connected on its western side to the neighbouring Beinn Ìme by a low col at 492 metres. Ben Vane is characterised by steep and rugged slopes which fall away to the Inveruglas Water to the east and the Allt Coiregroigan to the south; to the north the descent is more undulating going over the subsidiary top of Beinn Dubh before falling to the valley at the north end of Loch Sloy. Dense forestry cloak the mountain on its lower southern slope in Allt Coiregroigan. Also on these southern slopes by the Allt Coiregroigan is a disused quarry which provided crushed stone used for the construction of the Loch Sloy dam in the late 1940s. The dam wall lies two km to the north of the quarry and a conveyor belt was constructed to carry the crushed stone over the lower slopes of Ben Vane to the batching plant beside the dam.

== Climbing ==
The direct route up the mountain starts from the paid car park at grid reference NN322098 opposite the Loch Sloy power station on the banks of Loch Lomond and follows the private tarmac road by the Inveruglas Water up to the Loch Sloy hydro dam for two kilometres before striking steeply up the mountain's eastern ridge. Initially there is some boggy ground and some crags to avoid higher up but the top is easily reached after a few false summits on the way. Ben Vane can also be climbed in conjunction with some of the other Arrochar Alps, especially Beinn Ìme and Beinn Narnain. On walk Highlands a popular walking website the route is considered a grade 4.

The summit of the mountain is a small plateau crowned by a cairn. The highlights of the view from the top of Ben Vane are Ben Vorlich and Loch Sloy to the northeast and the rest of the Arrochar Alps to the southwest. A' Chrois looks especially fine across the deep glen of Allt Coiregrogain. The vista to Lochs Arklet and Katrine to the east is very good.

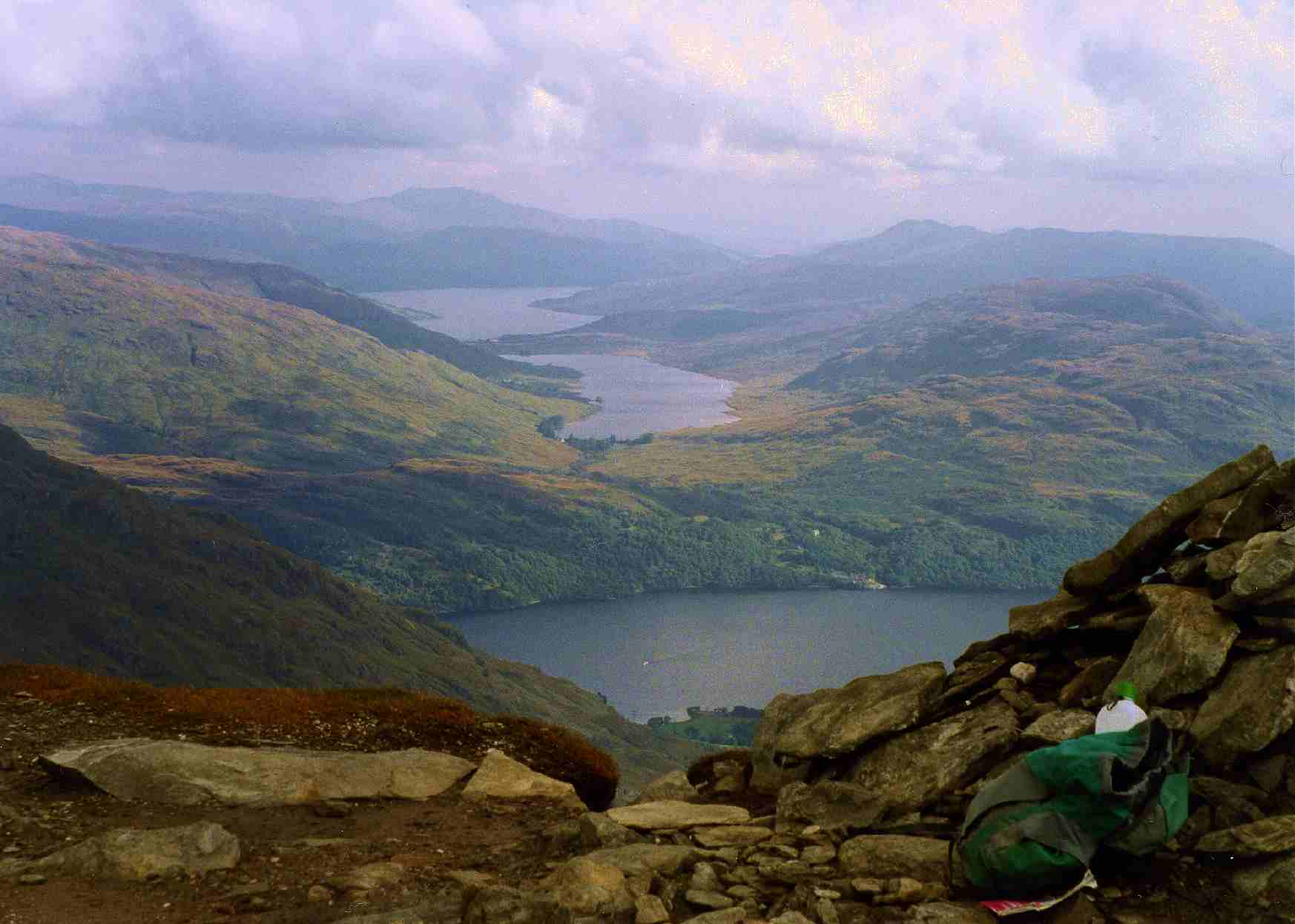
Lochs Arklet and Katrine seen over Loch Lomond from the summit of Ben Vane
