= The Brack =

Mountain in Argyll and Bute, Scotland

Coordinates: 56.18719°N 4.82958°W

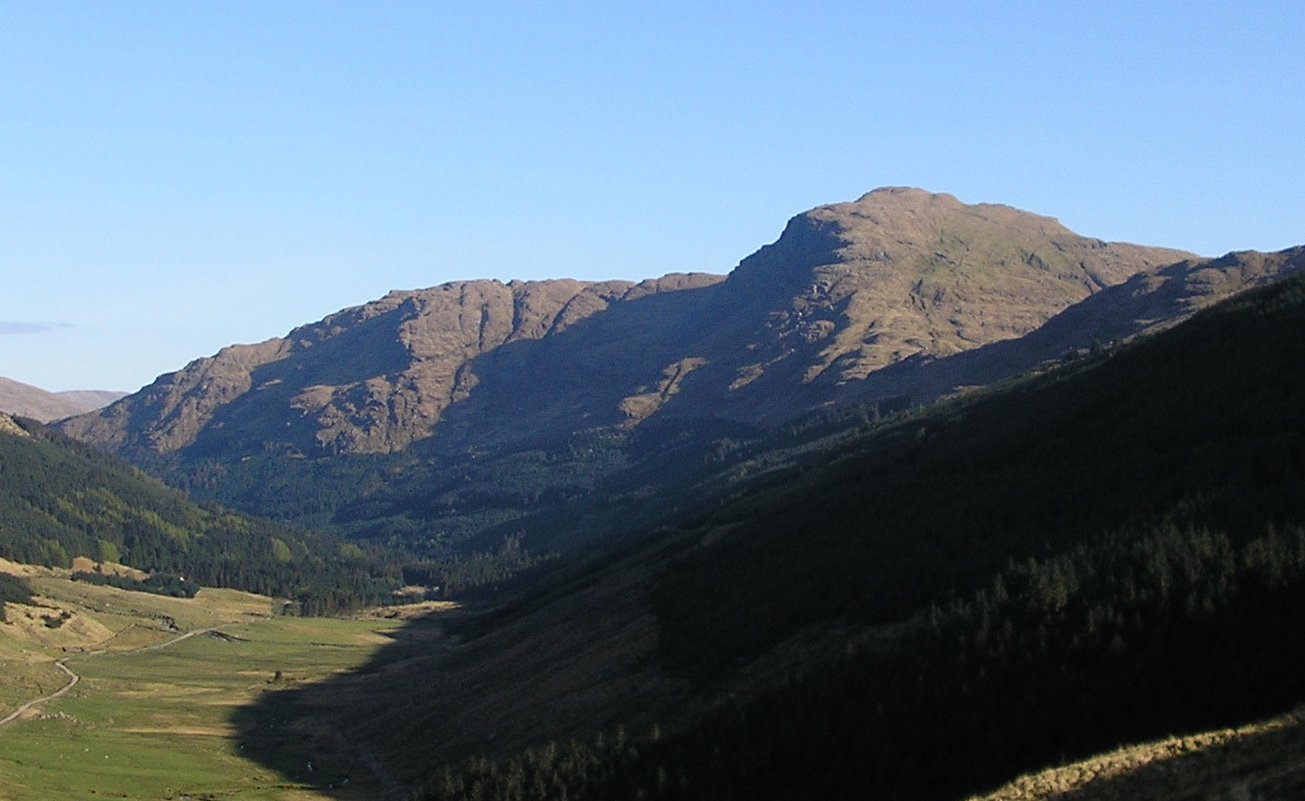
- The Brack viewed from the A83 road at Rest and be Thankful

Highest point
- Elevation: 787.5 m (2,584 ft)
- Prominence: 403 m (1,322 ft)

Geography
- Location: Argyll and Bute, Scotland
- Parent range: Arrochar Alps, Grampian Mountains
- OS grid: NN245030
- Topo map: OS Landranger 56

The Brack is a mountain, located in the Arrochar Alps, on the south side of Glen Croe, near Loch Goil in Argyll and Bute in Scotland. The Brack has two summits: the lower peak to the southeast, Cruach Fhiarach, can be seen from the shores of Loch Long; while the main peak is seen from Glen Croe and Loch Goil.

The Brack is in the Ardgoil range, which is located on a peninsula bounded on the west by Loch Goil and Loch Long on the east, both sea lochs being arms of the Firth of Clyde. The Brack is connected by cols to its neighbouring Corbetts, Ben Donich and Cnoc Còinnich, and is surrounded by a number of higher peaks. It is classified as a Corbett in its own right. The Loch Lomond and Cowal Way passes to the south of the peak, over the bealach separating The Brack from Cnoc Còinnich.

The Brack is usually climbed from Glen Croe, often in conjunction with Ben Donich. A traverse of the mountain can also be made by linking the direct ascent from Glen Croe with a descent via the south west ridge to the head of the Coilessan Glen. It may also be climbed from Lochgoilhead. Glen Croe, the Arrochar Alps, Ardgartan and Loch Goil are home to pine martens and eagles because of the rugged terrain.

== Mountaineering interest ==
The Brack is known to climbers for its collection of mountaineering routes, both summer and winter. The line of the Inglis Clark Arête is prominent on the east skyline when the mountain is viewed from Glen Croe, with the deep gashes of Great Central Gully and Elephant Gully obvious in the large north-facing cliff face. The climbs on the mountain are detailed in the Scottish Mountaineering Club guide to Arran, Arrochar and the Southern Highlands.
