= Beinn Luibhean =

Mountain of Scotland

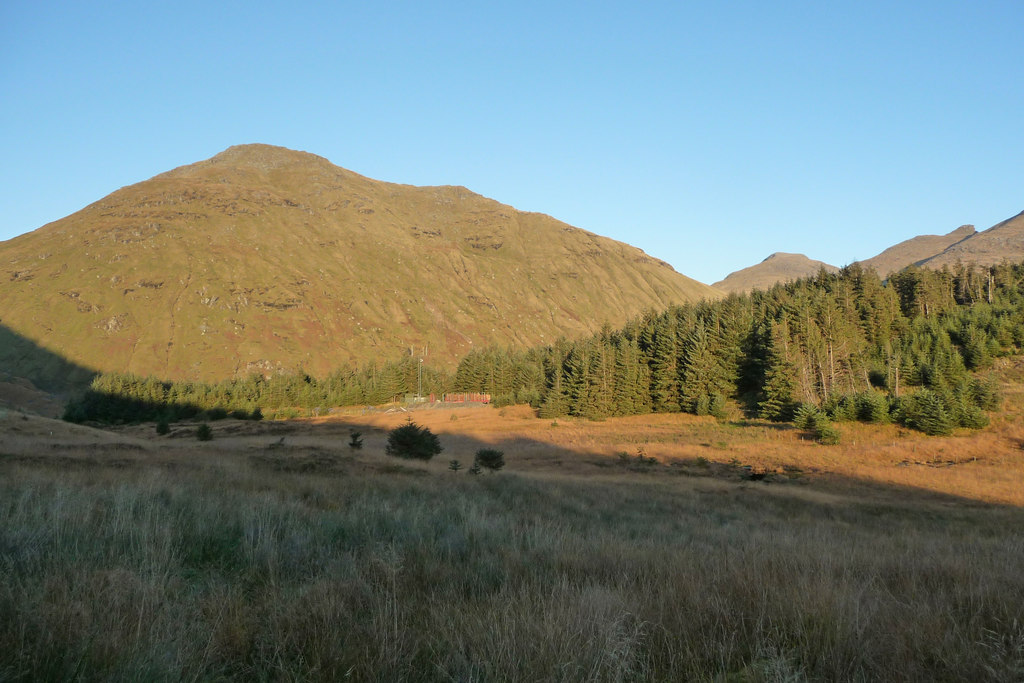
- View towards Beinn Luibhean

Highest point
- Elevation: 859.7 m (2,821 ft)
- Prominence: 181 m (594 ft)
- Parent peak: Beinn Ime
- Listing: Corbett, Marilyn
- Coordinates: 56.231°N 4.836°W

Geography
- Location: Scotland
- Parent range: Arrochar Alps
- OS grid: NN24270792

Beinn Luibhean is one of the Arrochar Alps in the Argyll Highlands of Scotland, located to the northern side of Glen Croe between Loch Long in Dunbartonshire to the East and Loch Fyne in the Remote Highlands of Argyll to the West. The landscape to the West of Loch Long changes as the shoreline provides the gateway to Argyll, the district in the Western Highlands of Scotland that form the first ingredients to a wilderness and has a real sense of remoteness and isolation from the Lowlands and populated parts of the Central Belt. The Arrochar Alps are a Mountain Range which Run from the Loch Goil in the South and West towards Tyndrum in the North. Beinn Luibhean stands at a height of 2821 ft, 859.7 m. The Nearest Mountains to Beinn Luibhean include The Cobbler, Beinn Ime and Beinn Narnain.
