= Arrochar Alps =

Mountain range in Argyll and Bute, Scotland

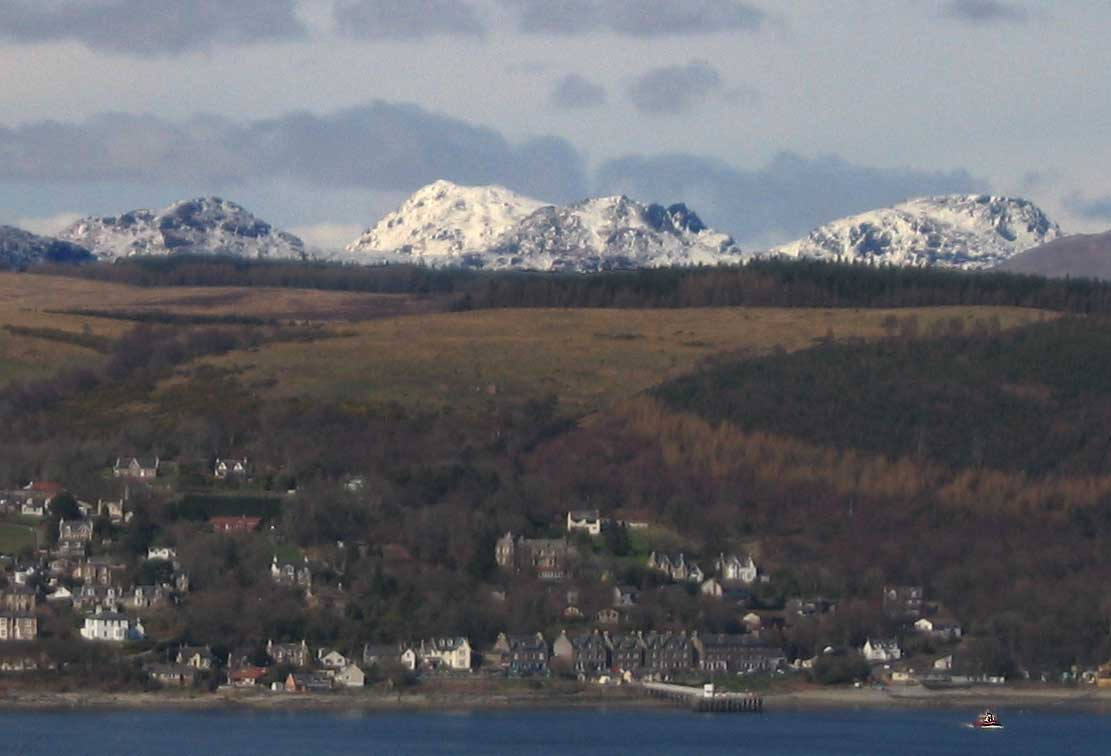
- View across the Firth of Clyde, from about 29 km (18 mi) south of Arrochar. From the left, The Brack, the snowy mass of Beinn Ìme, the peaks of the Cobbler and Beinn Narnain. See a wider view.

Highest point
- Peak: Beinn Ìme
- Elevation: 1,012.2 m (3,321 ft)
- Coordinates: 56°14′10″N 04°49′01″W

Geography
- Country: Scotland
- Region: Argyll and Bute
- OS grid: NN 25499 08399

The Arrochar Alps are a group of mountains located around the heads of Loch Long, Loch Fyne, and Loch Goil. They are part of the Grampian Mountains range, which stretch across Scotland. The villages of Arrochar and Lochgoilhead are the nearest settlements. Many of the mountains are located on the Cowal Peninsula in Argyll and Bute, west of Scotland.

The mountains are especially popular due to their proximity and accessibility from the central belt of Scotland including Glasgow. They are mostly within both the Loch Lomond and The Trossachs National Park and also in the Argyll Forest Park.

The Glens that give access into the heart of the mountain range include: Glen Croe, Hell's Glen, Glen Mhor and Glen Kinglas.

The A83, a main trunk road to the west coast of Scotland passes through the area. There is a train station nearby at Arrochar and Tarbet railway station.

== List ==
The list below includes the Munros, Munro Tops, Corbetts, Corbett Tops and Grahams.

- Munros:
  - Beinn Ìme, 1,012.2 metres (3,321 ft)
  - Beinn Bhuidhe, 948.5 metres (3,112 ft)
  - Ben Vorlich, 942.8 metres (3,093 ft)
  - Beinn Narnain, 926.8 metres (3,041 ft)
  - Ben Vane, 915.76 metres (3,004.5 ft)
- Munro Tops:
  - Ben Vorlich (North Top), 932.1 metres (3,058 ft)
- Corbetts:
  - Beinn an Lochain, 901.7 metres (2,958 ft)
  - The Cobbler (Ben Arthur) 886.7 metres (2,909 ft)
  - Beinn Luibhean, 859.7 metres (2,821 ft)
  - Ben Donich, 846.5 metres (2,777 ft)
  - Binnein an Fhidhleir, 817.8 metres (2,683 ft)
  - The Brack, 787.5 metres (2,584 ft)
  - Beinn Bheula, 779 metres (2,556 ft)
  - Cnoc Còinnich, 763.5 metres (2,505 ft)
- Corbett Tops:
  - The Cobbler (North Peak), 870.7 metres (2,857 ft)
  - The Cobbler (South Top), 858.4 metres (2,816 ft)
  - A' Chrois, 848.7 metres (2,784 ft)
  - Beinn Chorranach, 887.6 metres (2,912 ft)
  - Little Hills, 808 metres (2,651 ft)
  - The Brack (West), 578 metres (1,896 ft)
  - Ben Vorlich (South Top), 783.4 metres (2,570 ft)
  - Beinn Dubh, 774.4 metres (2,541 ft)
- Grahams:
  - Stob an Eas, 732 metres (2,402 ft)
  - Beinn Lochain, 702.9 metres (2,306 ft)
  - Stob na Boine Druim-fhinn, 658.4 metres (2,160 ft)
  - Creag Tharsuinn, 643 metres (2,110 ft)
  - Cruach nam Mult, 611.2 metres (2,005 ft)
  - Cruach nan Capull, 612 metres (2,008 ft)
- Other mountains:
  - Mullach Coire a' Chuir, 640 metres (2,100 ft)
  - Cruach nan Capull, 565 metres (1,854 ft)
  - Cruach Tairbeirt, 415 metres (1,362 ft)
  - Beinn Reithe, 656.2 metres (2,153 ft)
  - The Saddle (Lochgoilhead), 520.6 metres (1,708 ft)
  - Clach Bheinn (Lochgoilhead), 441 metres (1,447 ft)
  - Tom Molach, 370 metres (1,210 ft)
  - Càrn Glas, 536.1 metres (1,759 ft)
  - Tom nan Gamhna, 389 metres (1,276 ft)
  - The Steeple (Lochgoilhead), 382 metres (1,253 ft)
  - Cruach nam Miseag, 607 metres (1,991 ft)

== Areas ==
- Tarbet, Loch Lomond, (Eastern Gateway alongside Ardlui and Arrochar).
- Arrochar, Loch Long, (Eastern Gateway alongside Ardlui and Tarbet).
- Succoth, Loch Long.
- Ardgartan, Loch Long.
- Rest and be thankful, Glen Croe.
- Butter Bridge, Glen Kinglas.
- Cairndow, Loch Fyne.
- Ardno, Loch Fyne.
- St Catherines, Loch Fyne.
- Strachur (South Western Gateway), Loch Fyne.
- Lochgoilhead, Loch Goil.
- Carrick Castle, Loch Goil.
- Ardlui, north end of Loch Lomond, (Northern and Eastern Gateway alongside Arrochar and Tarbet).

== Lochs ==
- Loch Goil
- Loch Restil
- Loch Long
- Loch Lomond
- Loch Sloy
- Loch Fyne

== Glens ==
- Glenbranter (Parly)
- Hell's Glen
- Glen Kinglas
- Glen Croe
- Glen Mhor, Glen Croe (Rest & be Thankful viewpoint) to Hell's Glen.
- Glen Loin, north of the head of Loch Long at Arrochar.
- Glen Falloch, northeast of Loch Lomond to Crianlarich.
- Glen Fyne, north of the head of Loch Fyne.
- Glen Tarbet from Loch Lomond to Arrochar. Not Tarbet, Loch Nevis in Lochaber; or Tarbert, Kintyre; Tarbat, Ross and Cromarty. Very confusing!

== Parks ==
- Loch Lomond and the Trossachs National Park
- Argyll Forest Park, Cowal Peninsula
- Ardgoil Estate, Ardgoil Peninsula

== See also ==
- Mountains and hills of Scotland
- Mixed climbing
- Scrambling
- Hillwalking
- The Countryside Code
- Scottish Outdoor Access Code
- Mountain Rescue Committee of Scotland
- Scotland's Charity Air Ambulance
- Freedom to roam
- Land Reform (Scotland) Act 2003
- Tarbert an article with a list of Tarbert place names.
- Tarbet a disambiguation of Tarbet place names.
- Tarbat, Ross and Cromarty.
