= Beinn Lochain =

One of the Arrochar Alps at 702.9 m, in the Argyll Highlands

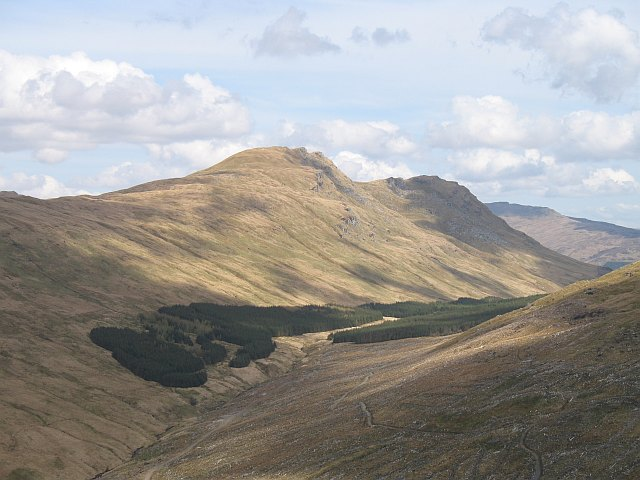
- Beinn Lochain

Highest point
- Elevation: 702.9 m (2,306 ft)
- Prominence: 375.4 m (1,232 ft)
- Listing: Marilyn, Graham
- Coordinates: 56°09′46″N 4°57′52″W

Geography
- Location within Argyll and Bute
- Location: Argyll and Bute, Scotland
- Parent range: Arrochar Alps
- OS grid: NN160006

Beinn Lochain is one of the Arrochar Alps at 702.9 metres (2,306 ft), in the Argyll Highlands. The mountain is situated to the west of Lochgoilhead. It continues the rugged and wild feel of the local area as it sits next to its higher neighbour Beinn Bheula which reaches a height of over 2,500 feet.
