= Ben Vorlich, Loch Lomond =

Mountain in Scotland

Coordinates: 56.27336°N 4.75516°W

Ben Vorlich
- Beinn Mhùrlaig
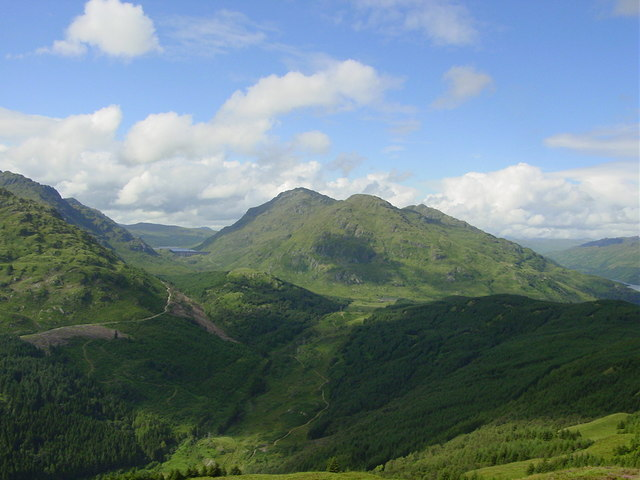
- Ben Vorlich from the south

Highest point
- Elevation: 943 m (3,094 ft)
- Prominence: 632 m (2,073 ft)
- Parent peak: Beinn Ìme
- Listing: Munro, Marilyn, County top (Dunbartonshire)

Naming
- English translation: Hill of the bay
- Language of name: Gaelic
- Pronunciation: Gaelic [peɲ ˈvuːrˠl̪ˠɛkʲ]

Geography
- Location: Arrochar Alps, Argyll, Scotland
- Parent range: Arrochar Alps, Grampian Mountains
- OS grid: NN295124
- Topo map: OS Landranger 56

Ben Vorlich (Scottish Gaelic: Beinn Mhùrlaig) is a mountain in the Arrochar Alps of Argyll, in the Southern Highlands of Scotland. It reaches 943 metres (3,094 ft), making it a Munro. It lies between Loch Lomond and Loch Sloy. Ben Vorlich is the highest point of the historic county of Dunbartonshire.

The A82 road and the West Highland railway line run on the eastern side of Ben Vorlich, above the shoreline of Loch Lomond.

== Geography ==
The peak forms a north–south ridge on the western side of Loch Lomond, with a subsidiary ridge known as Little Hills running from the summit east down to the shores of the loch. There are three small summits around 800m apart along the main ridge; the central one is the highest, though the southern one has a trig point.

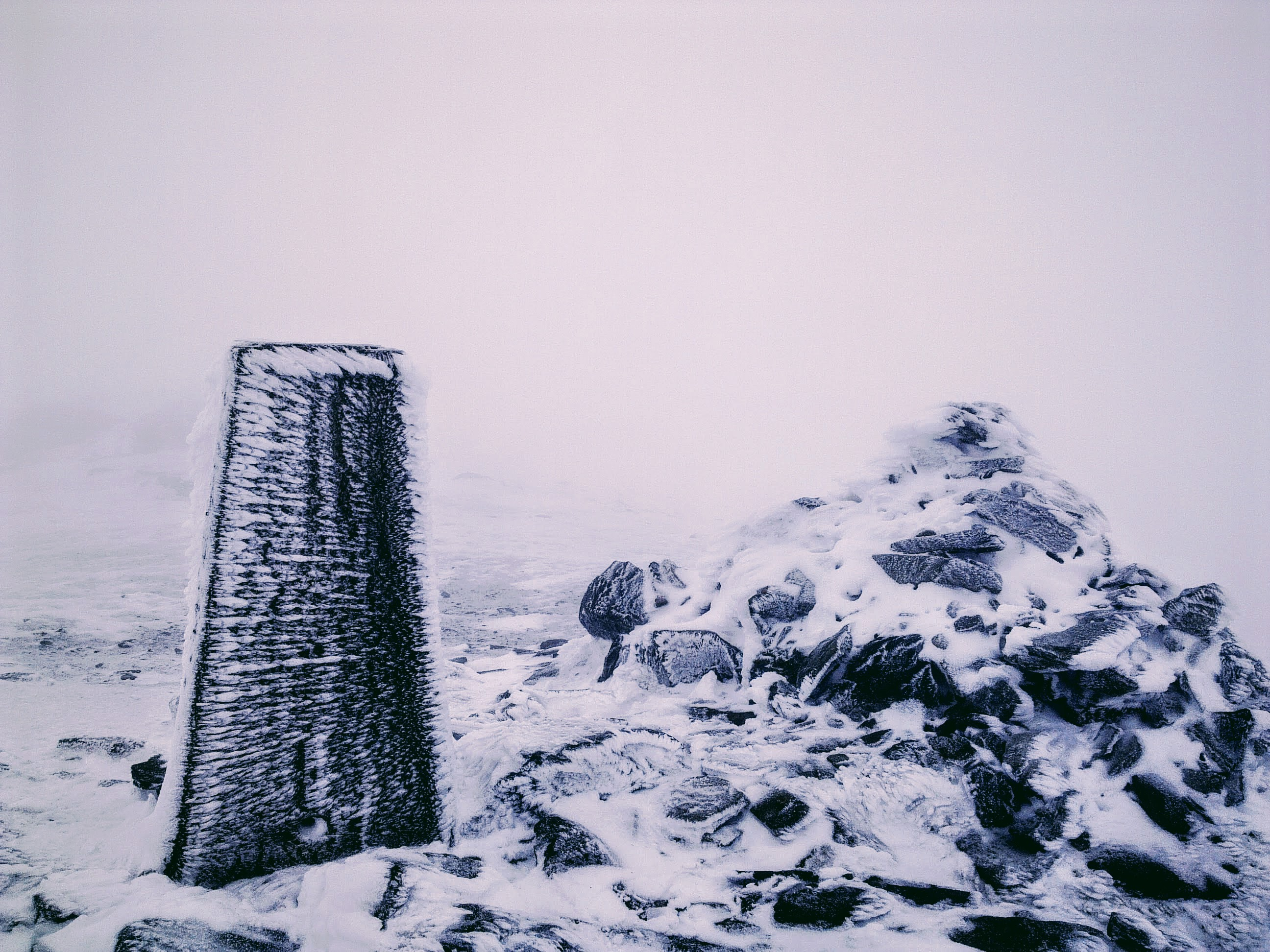
Trig point and cairn on the southern peak of Ben Vorlich – the highest summit is marked by a cairn further on.

== Climbing ==
The mountain can be approached from two directions the east and the west. When approaching from the west a walk begins close to Loch Sloy power station and for around 3km follows the same route as the one for Ben Vane along the road to Loch Sloy Dam. Unlike the aforementioned hill the walk continues along the road for another kilometre until it reaches a stair path on the right hand side of the road. The ascent is steep until one is roughly 1km from the southern summit where the gradient becomes more gradual. Throughout the walk several streams must be crossed which can be done so by using stepping stones and or jumping across them. The eastern approach begins at Stuckgowan a farm a mile south of Ardlui or said settlement. The path is significantly lower quality than the east and is extremely boggy. Often the path becomes difficult to follow if not outright vanishing. This path requires fording at least one body of water which can be difficult during bad weather due to the increased volume of water. This approach is significantly steeper than the eastern approach.
