= Cruach nam Miseag =

Mountain in Argyll and Bute, Scotland

Coordinates: 56°8′29″N 4°55′30″W

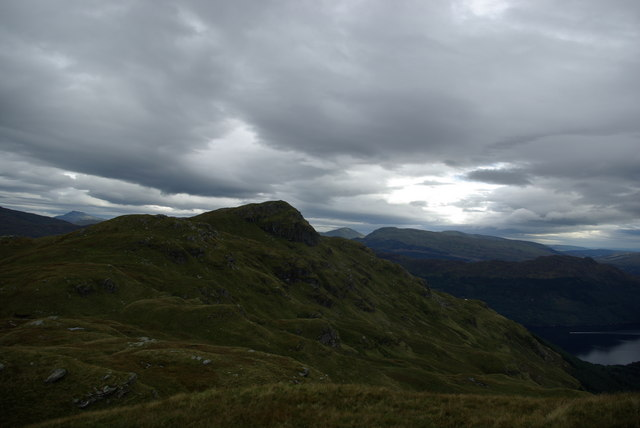
- Cruach nam Miseag

Highest point
- Elevation: 607 m (1,991 ft)
- Prominence: 206 m (676 ft)
- Listing: Marilyn

Geography
- Location: Argyll and Bute, Scotland
- Parent range: Arrochar Alps
- OS grid: NS18294981
- Topo map: OS Landranger 56

Cruach nam Miseag is a mountain near Lochgoilhead within the Arrochar Alps, Scotland. It reaches a height of 607 m (1989 ft). It is located at NS182981.
