= Beinn Chorranach =

One of the Arrochar Alps, in the Argyll Highlands, Scotland

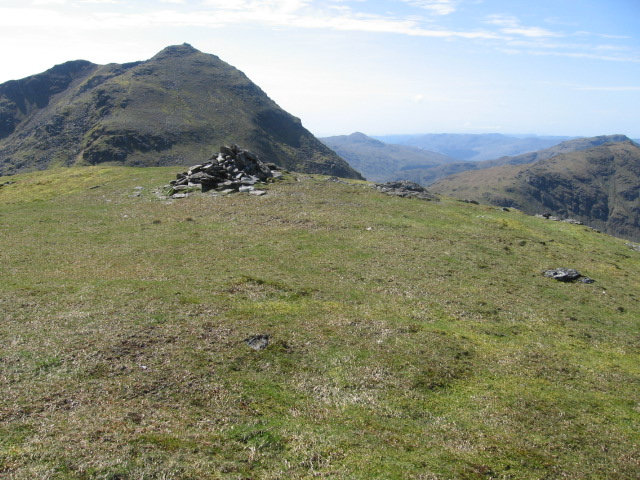
- Summit of Beinn Chorranach.

Highest point
- Elevation: 887.6 m (2,912 ft)
- Parent peak: Beinn Ìme
- Listing: Mountains of the British Isles
- Coordinates: 56°14′48″N 4°49′2″W

Geography
- Location within Argyll and Bute
- Location: Argyll and Bute, Scotland
- Parent range: Arrochar Alps
- OS grid: NN254095

Beinn Chorranach is one of the Arrochar Alps, a mountain range that marks the start of the Argyll Highlands and provides a wilderness of long coastlines and high mountains with forested hill sides. Beinn Chorranach's parent peak is Beinn Ìme, the biggest mountain in the range. Beinn Chorranach lies at the head of lower Glen Kinglas and is located between Loch Fyne (the biggest sea loch in Scotland) and Loch Lomond (the biggest freshwater loch in Scotland). East of Beinn Chorranach is Loch Lomond as the mountain can be seen from Inversnaid and further east to The Trossachs wilderness. Further west is the rest of the wild Argyll scenery and marks the first real sense of isolation and wilderness after arriving in the Highlands at Loch Lomond.
