= Mullach Coire a' Chuir =

Mountain in Argyll and Bute, Scotland

Coordinates: 56°11′17″N 4°56′52″W

Mullach Coire a' Chuir is a 639 metres (2,096 ft) rugged mountain in Argyll, Scotland and forms part of the well known Arrochar Alps range. It lies to the west of Glen Goil and is visible from Lochgoilhead.
