= Cruach nam Mult =

Mountain in Argyll and Bute, Scotland

Coordinates: 56°12′28″N 4°57′9″W

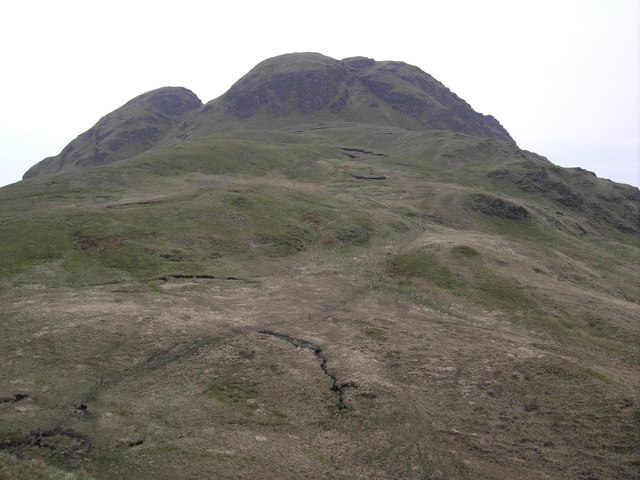
- Cruach nam Mult

Highest point
- Elevation: 611.2 m (2,005 ft)
- Prominence: 282 m (925 ft)
- Listing: Graham, Marilyn

Geography
- Location: Argyll and Bute, Scotland
- Parent range: Arrochar Alps

Cruach nam Mult is a mountain in the Arrochar Alps, Argyll, Scotland which lies to the southern side of Hell's Glen. The mountain is near Loch Fyne and GlenGoil and is part of the northern side of the area of the Arrochar Alps that follow south to Loch Goil.
