= Creag Tharsuinn =

Mountain in Scotland

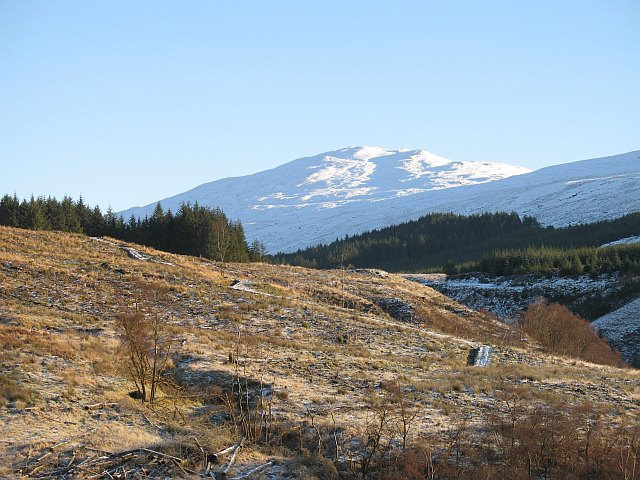
- Creag Tharsuinn in winter

Highest point
- Elevation: 643 m (2,110 ft)
- Prominence: 395 m (1,296 ft)
- Listing: Graham, Marilyn
- Coordinates: 56°04′36″N 5°04′30″W

Geography
- Location: Argyll and Bute, Scotland
- Parent range: Arrochar Alps, Grampian Mountains
- OS grid: NS088913
- Topo map: OS Landranger 56

Creag Tharsuinn (643 m) is a mountain in the Arrochar Alps of Scotland. It lies in the Cowal peninsula, Argyll and Bute.

Taking the form of a long ridge, the peak rises steeply above the surrounding glens. It is usually climbed from Garvie in Glendaruel. The nearest village is Kilmodan.
