= Beinn Bheula =

Mountain located between Loch Goil and Loch Eck

Coordinates: 56.14158°N 4.97273°W

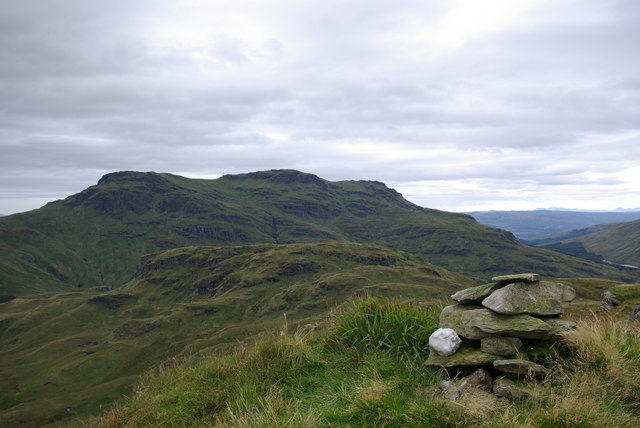
- Beinn Bheula from Cruach nam Miseag summit

Highest point
- Elevation: 779 m (2,556 ft)
- Prominence: 557 m (1,827 ft)
- Listing: Corbett, Marilyn

Geography
- Location within Scotland
- Location: Argyll and Bute, Scotland
- Parent range: Arrochar Alps, Grampian Mountains
- OS grid: NS154983

Beinn Bheula is a mountain located between Loch Goil and Loch Eck. It is part of the Arrochar Alps range. Beinn Bheula appears rugged from Lochgoilhead, with several summits, the highest of which is Caisteal Dubh (Gaelic for black castle). It is commonly climbed from Loch Goil
