= Glen Croe =

Glen in Argyll and Bute

Glen Croe Gleann a' Chrò (Scottish Gaelic)
- Glen
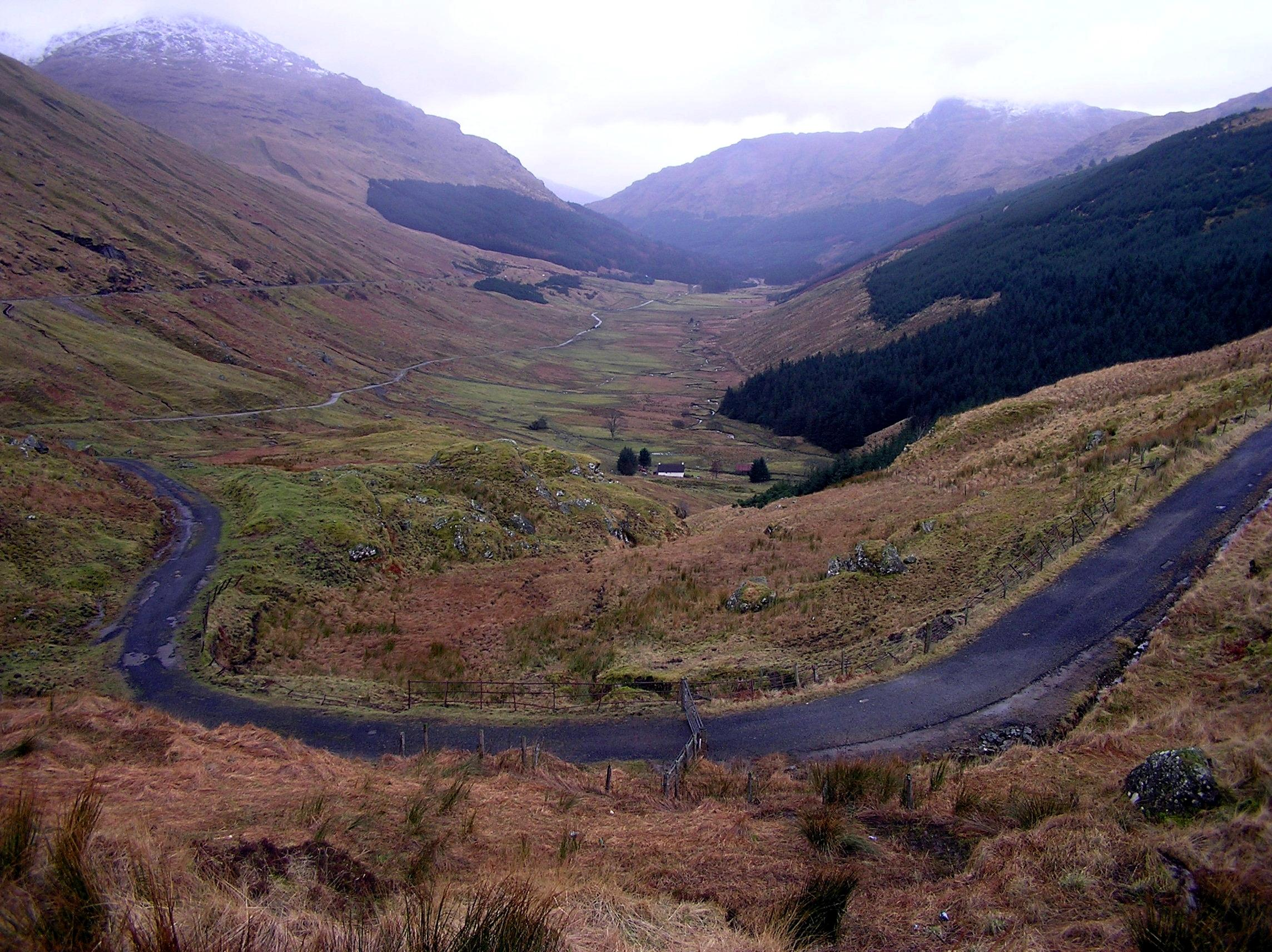
- View of the Rest and Be Thankful incline, Old Military Road. Glen Croe.

- Location within Scotland
- Coordinates: 56°12′00″N 04°49′59″W
- Grid position: NN2304007297
- Location: Cowal, Argyll and Bute, Scotland.
- Formed by: glacial erosion

Glen Croe (Scottish Gaelic: Gleann a' Chrò) is a glen in the heart of the Arrochar Alps in Argyll and Bute, Scotland. The glen is surrounded by large and rugged mountains characterised by huge boulders. The Croe Water flows through the glen and into Loch Long.

== Geography ==
Glen Croe is located to the north west of Loch Lomond and Loch Long, draining into the latter. At the head of the glen is the pass leading to Glen Kinglas. The A83 road runs the length of the glen, passing the viewpoint at Rest & Be Thankful, at the west of the Glen. Glen Croe is situated entirely within the Argyll Forest Park in Cowal. The glen is also within the Loch Lomond and The Trossachs National Park.

The mountains on either side are:

- Beinn Ìme (Munro) at 1,011 metres (3,317 ft)
- Ben Donich (Corbett) at 847 metres (2,779 ft)
- Beinn Luibhean (Corbett) at 857 metres (2,812 ft)
- The Brack (Corbett) at 787 metres (2,582 ft)
- Beinn an Lochain (Corbett) at 703 metres (2,306 ft)
- The Cobbler (Corbett) at 870 metres (2,850 ft)

== Landslides ==
The glen was formed by glacial erosion and has repercussions today, as many areas are still unstable.

The A83 is prone to landslides, including the section within Glen Croe. The A83 is a main road to the west coast of Scotland. On 8 October 2023, ten people were airlifted off the road by helicopter, as they were trapped by seven separate landslides along a short section of the road.

When the A83 is closed, traffic is diverted onto the single track military road that runs in the bottom of the glen, till the steep incline at the head of the glen called Rest & be Thankful.

== History ==
The old road through the glen seen in the photograph (very top of article) is part of the military road that ran from Dumbarton to Inveraray. The old road was built in the 1740s under the supervision of Major William Caulfeild. A stone inscribed Rest & Be Thankful was erected around 1749, after this section of road was completed. The rest and be thankful refers to a steep incline on the old military road, that precedes, entering the pass through too Glen Kinglas.

== Rest and Be Thankful Speed Hill Climb ==
From 1906 until 1970, motor racing events, including hill climbs and rally stages took place here.

== Song ==
Gilleasbaig Mac an t-Saoir composed a song called "Òran Ghlinne Chrò", detailing the sadness he felt when the gamekeeper moved his flock out of the glen to make room for deer and sport hunting. Written in 1914.

== See also ==
- Rest and Be Thankful Speed Hill Climb
- Mountains and hills of Scotland
- Mixed climbing
- Scrambling
- Hillwalking
- The Countryside Code
- Scottish Outdoor Access Code
- Mountain Rescue Committee of Scotland
- Scotland's Charity Air Ambulance
- Freedom to roam
- Land Reform (Scotland) Act 2003

== Gallery ==
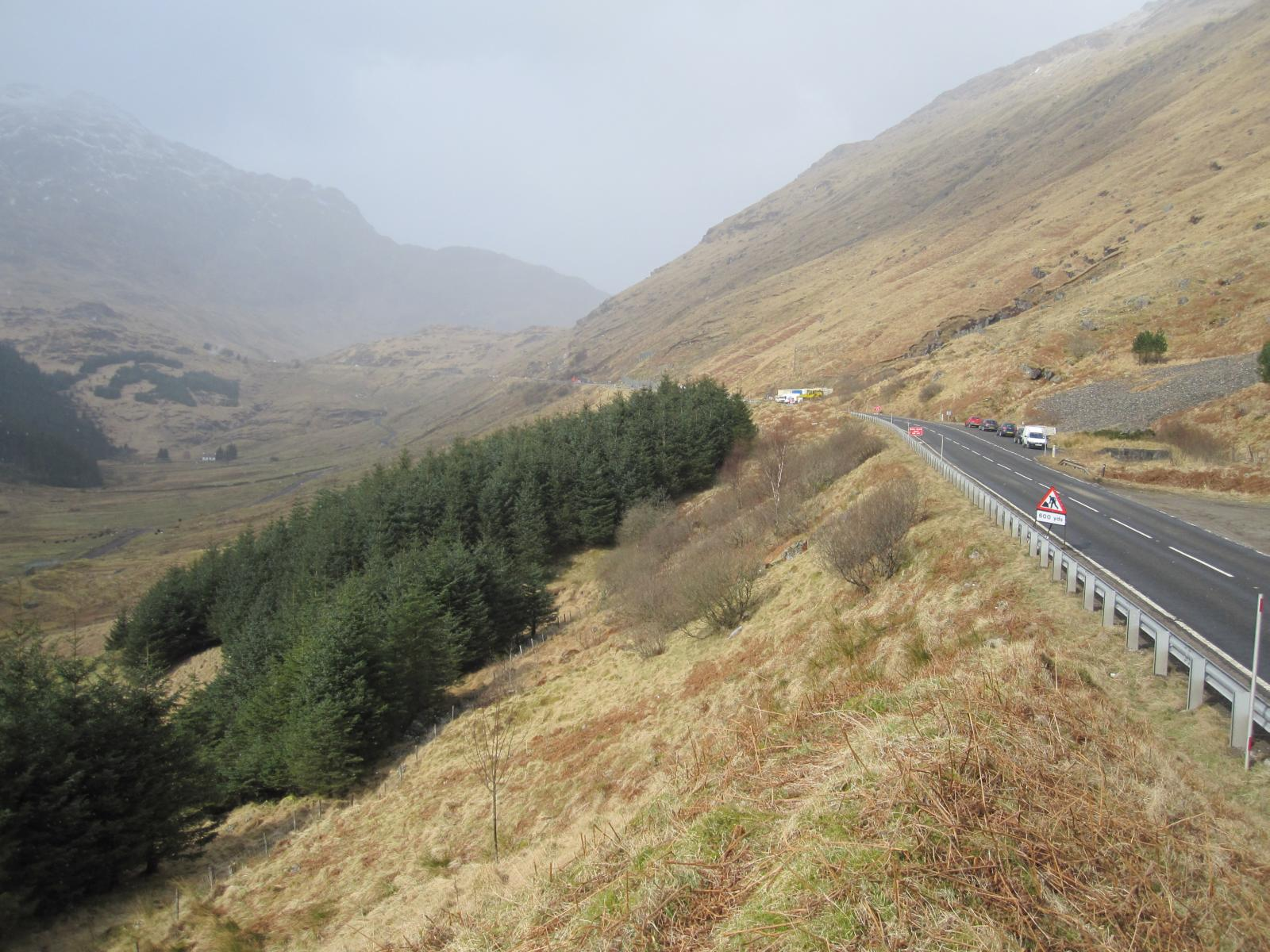
Glen Croe, Old and new roads

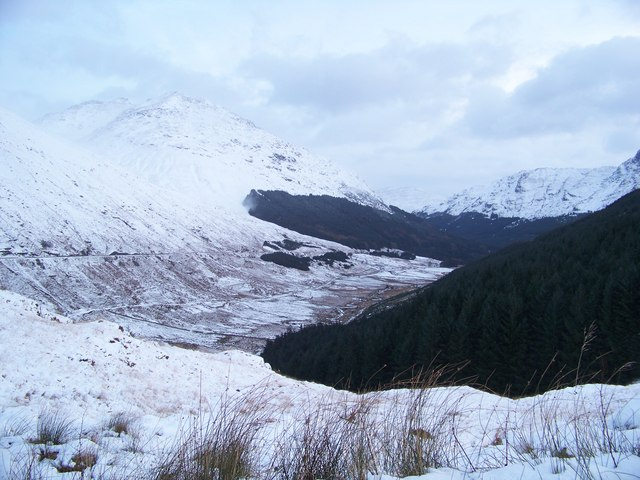
Glen Croe

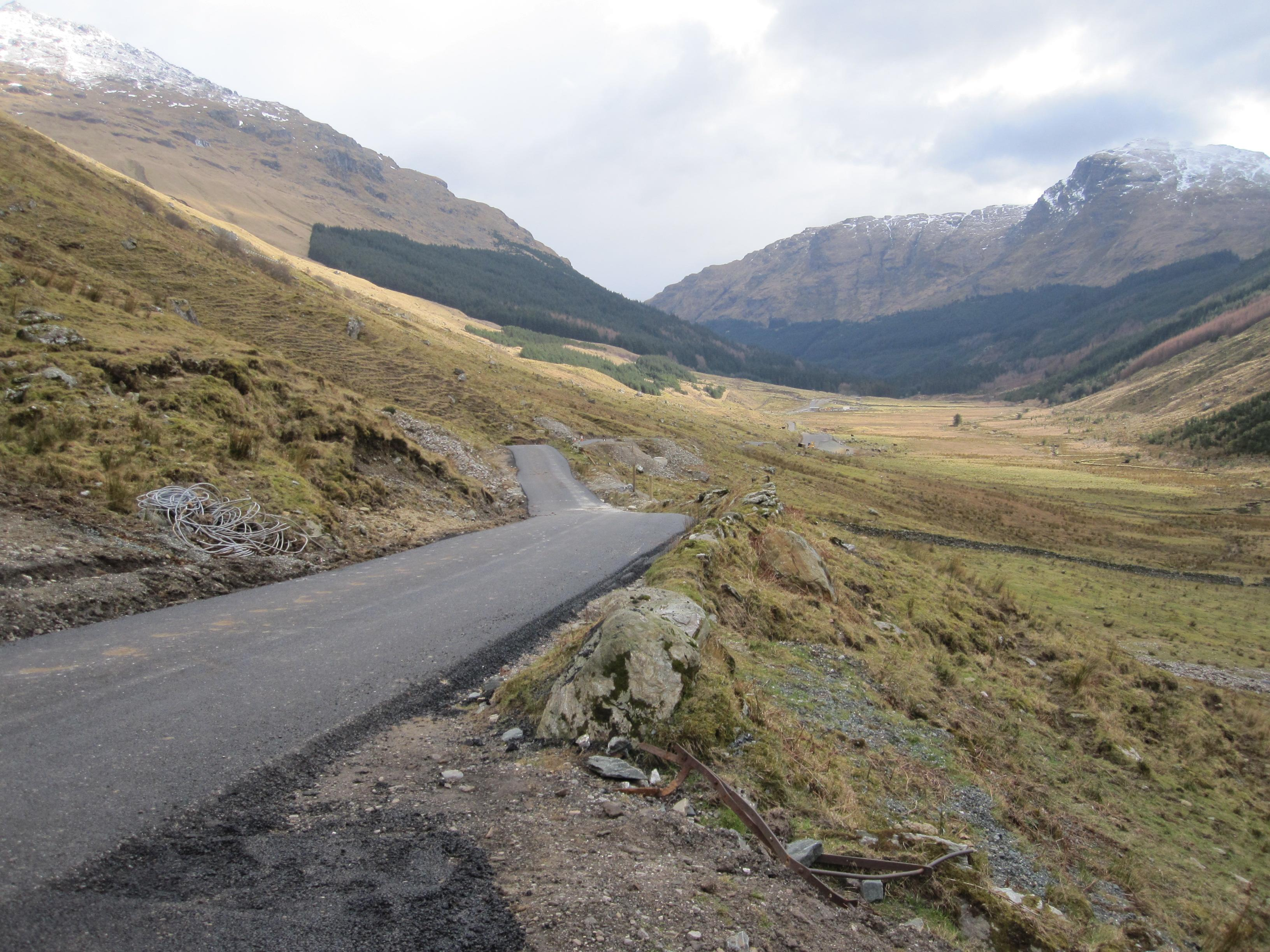
Glen Croe, Old Military Road

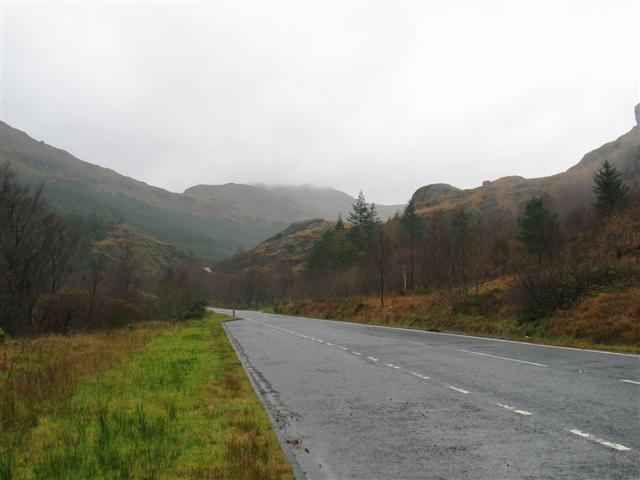
A83, Glen Croe

== Sources ==
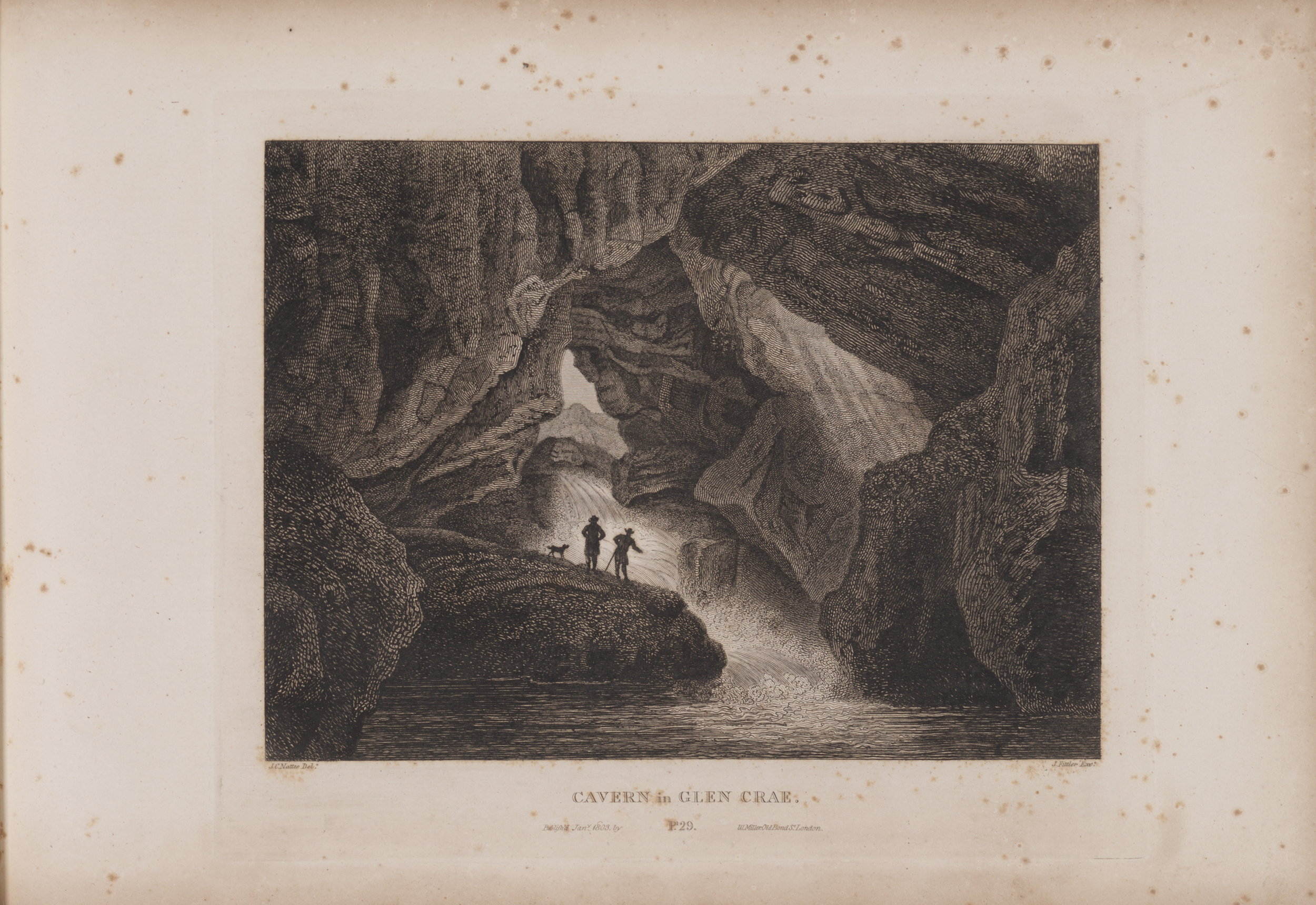
Engraving of the cavern in Glen Croe Plate from Scotia Depicta by James Fittler

- Engraving of a cavern in Glen Croe by James Fittler in the digitised copy of Scotia Depicta, or the antiquities, castles, public buildings, noblemen and gentlemen's seats, cities, towns and picturesque scenery of Scotland, 1804 at National Library of Scotland
