= Beinn Narnain =

Mountain in the southern Highlands of Scotland, near Arrochar

Coordinates: 56.22044°N 4.79008°W

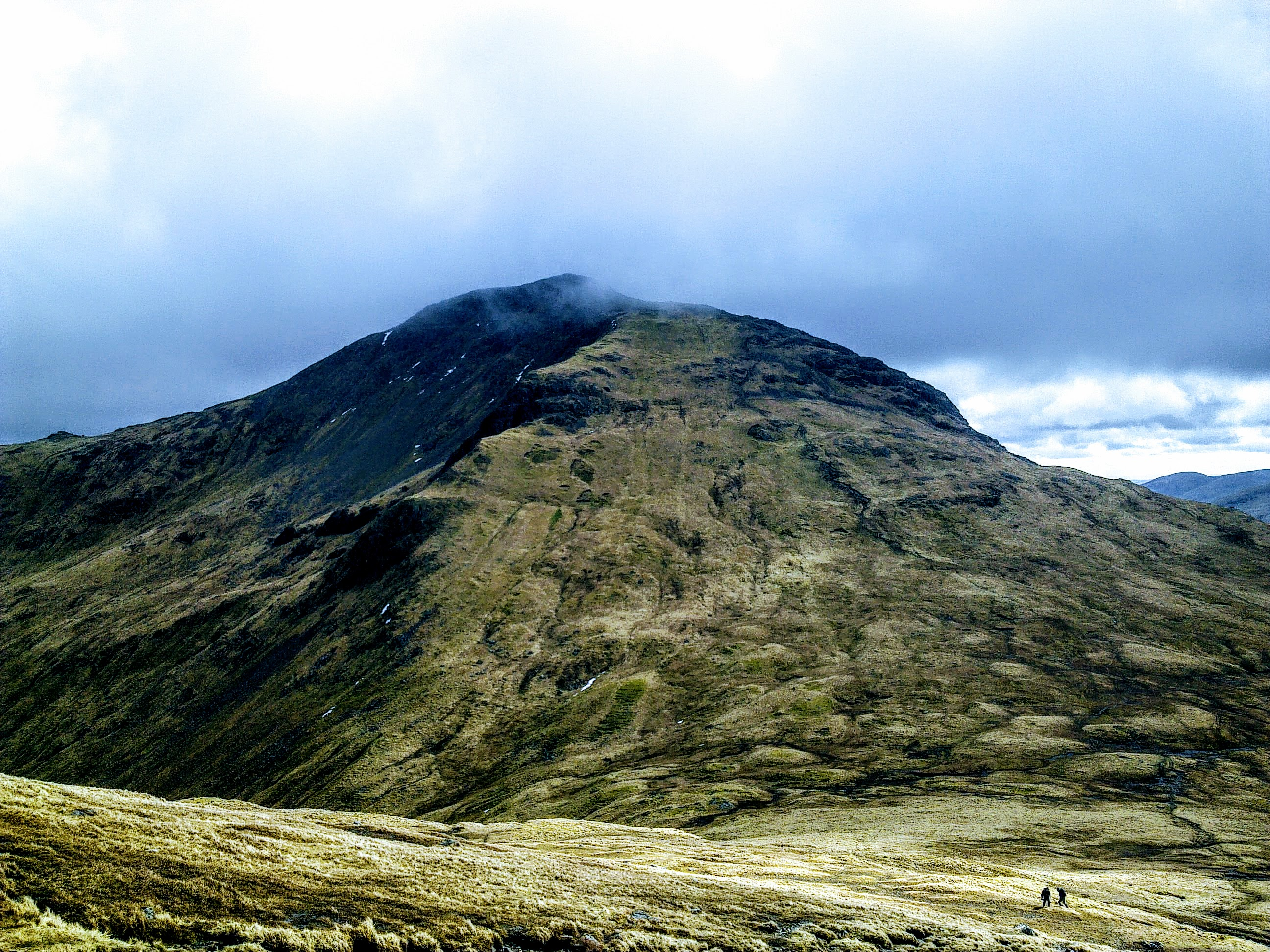
- Ben Narnain from the slopes of Beinn Ime

Highest point
- Elevation: 926 m (3,038 ft)
- Prominence: 289 m (948 ft)
- Parent peak: Beinn Ime
- Listing: Munro, Marilyn

Naming
- English translation: Hill of notches
- Language of name: Gaelic
- Pronunciation: Scottish Gaelic: [peɲ ˈn̪ˠaːrˠnɛɲ]

Geography
- Location: Arrochar Alps, Argyll and Bute, Grampian Mountains, Scotland
- OS grid: NN271066
- Topo map: OS Landranger 56

Beinn Narnain (sometimes anglicised as Ben Narnain) is a mountain in the southern Highlands of Scotland, near Arrochar. It forms part of a group of hills known (unofficially) as the Arrochar Alps, and is a Munro. The name Beinn Narnain means "hill of notches", and describes the mountain's notched profile. Beinn Narnain is usually climbed from Succoth at the head of Loch Long. The most commonly used route starts by climbing directly up the hillside, following a line of concrete blocks that were originally supports for a cable railway used during the construction of watercourse diversions forming part of the Loch Sloy hydro-electric scheme (Until the construction of new path, this was also the route towards The Cobbler). At one point the path crosses a level track, and one must continue by climbing some exposed rock immediately opposite – this appears to be part of the stream bed and not the path.

Snow-covered top of Beinn Narnairn

Where the concrete blocks cease, the path continues up Beinn Narnain's craggy south ridge. There are several mild scrambling sections, which provide an enjoyable experience for the casual walker. The route bypasses some impressive and, when shrouded in mist at least, apparently almost impassable crags – "The Spearhead" – by means of a steep gully immediately before the summit. The final stages of the climb include some mild exposure, but this should not intimidate a hillwalker of even limited experience.

Beinn Narnain's northern ridge drops down to the Bealach a' Mhàim, a three-sided bealach with other ridges leading to The Cobbler and Beinn Ìme; an ascent of Beinn Narnain may thus easily be extended to give a longer day on the Arrochar Alps.
