= The Cobbler =

Mountain in Argyll and Bute, Scotland

- Ben Arthur, Beinn Artair
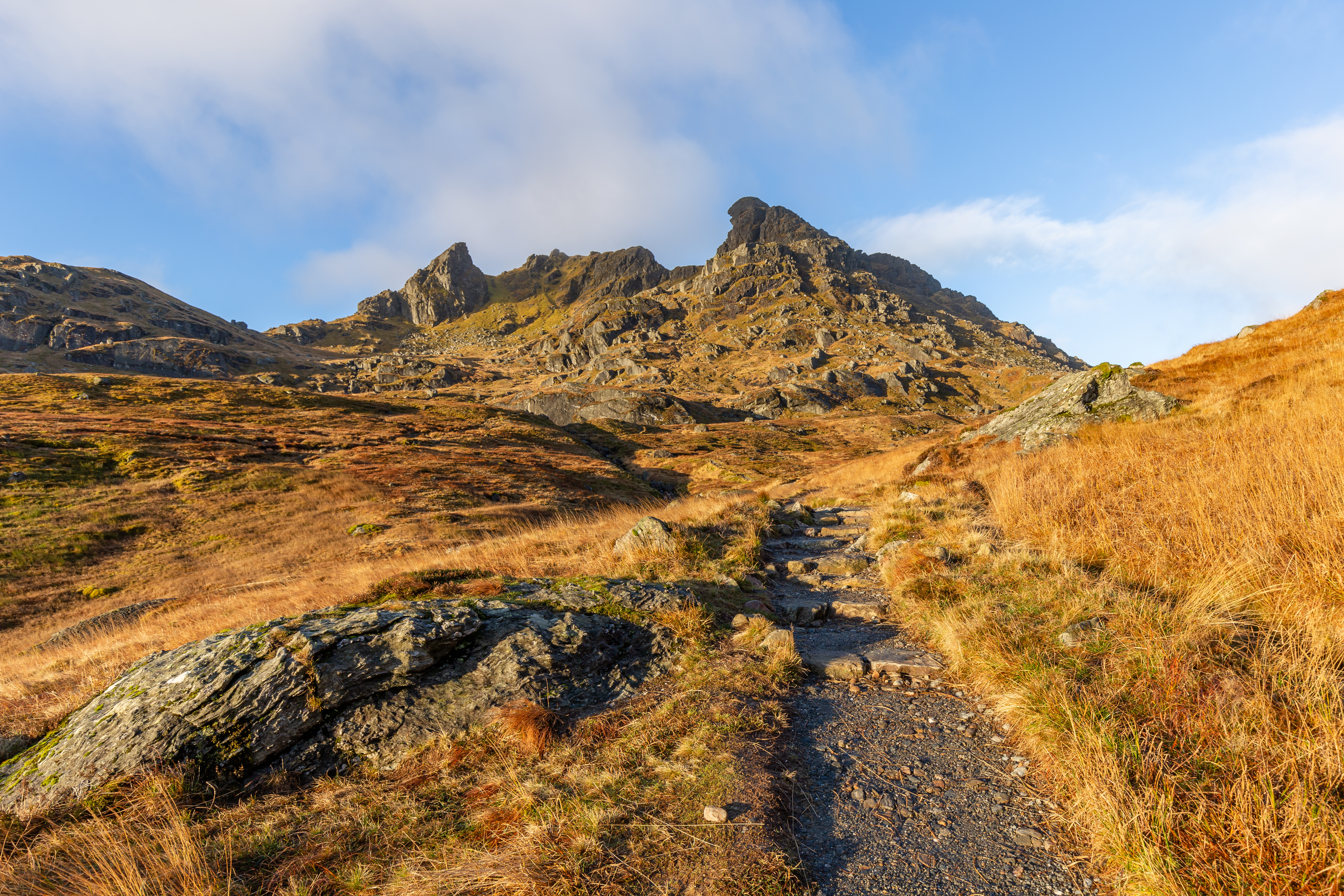

Highest point
- Elevation: 886.7 m (2,909 ft)
- Prominence: 260 m (850 ft)
- Parent peak: Beinn Narnain
- Listing: Corbett, Marilyn
- Coordinates: 56°12′43″N 4°48′39″W

Geography
- Location: Argyll and Bute, Scotland
- Parent range: Arrochar Alps, Grampian Mountains
- OS grid: NN259058
- Topo map: OS Landranger 56

The Cobbler (Scottish Gaelic: Beinn Artair) is an 886.7-metre (2,909 ft) mountain located near the head of Loch Long in Argyll and Bute, Scotland. It is a Corbett, and is an important site for rock climbing in the Southern Highlands. Many maps include the name Ben Arthur (an anglicisation of the Gaelic), but the name The Cobbler is more widely used. In the 19th century it was referred to as The Cobbler and his Wife.

== Arrochar Alps ==
The mountain is part of the Arrochar Alps. It is named for its large rocky summit features which are supposed to represent a cobbler bending over his last. The features are visible many miles away from the mountain. Despite the mountain falling short of Munro height, due to its summit features and ease of access, it is one of the most popular mountains in Scotland.

== Three summits ==
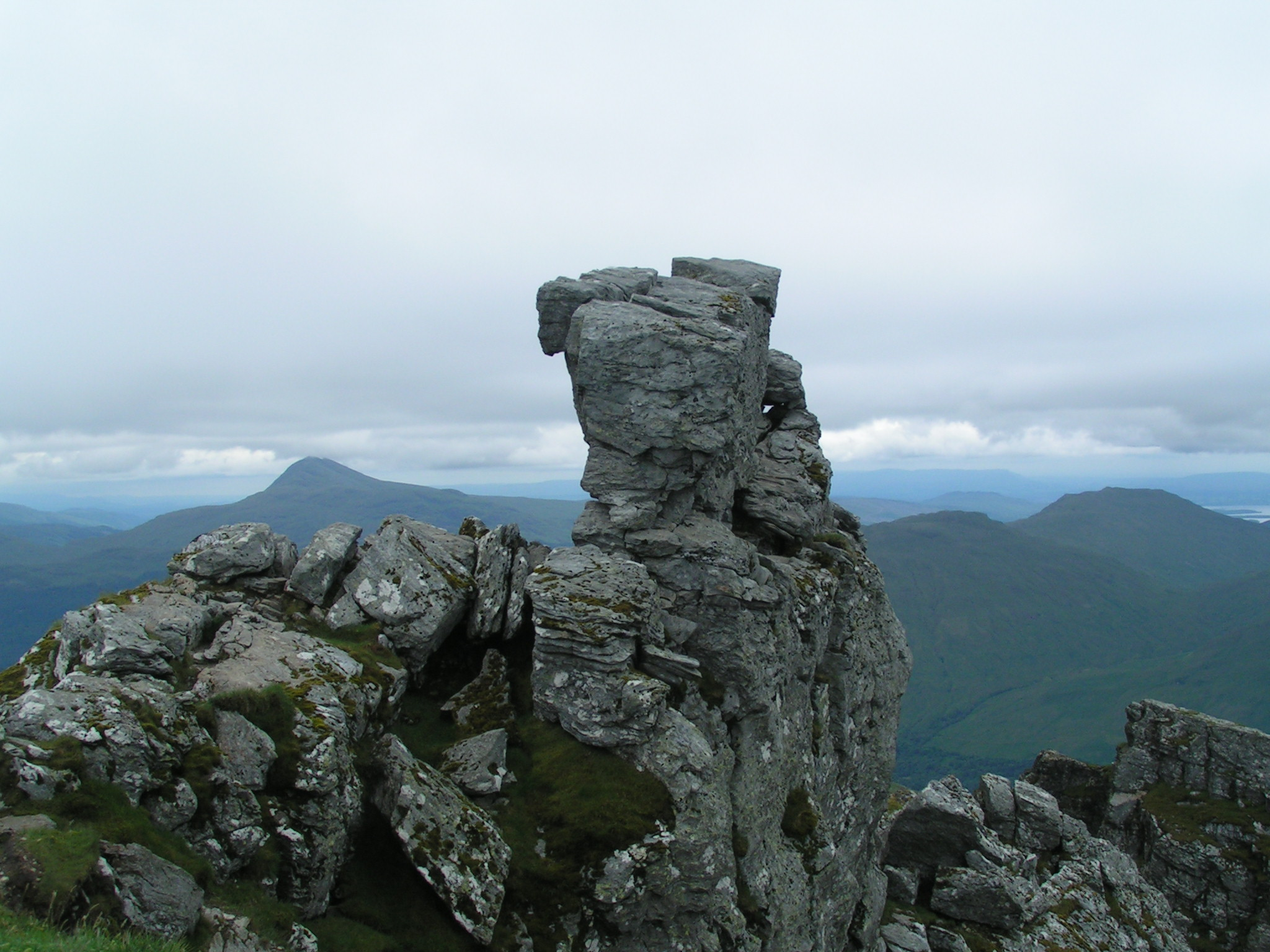
The highest summit, showing the ledge used to most easily reach it on its right (south) side. Ben Lomond is visible in the background to the left.

The Cobbler has three summits: the middle one is the highest at 886.7m (2,909 ft). The top is crowned by a rocky outcrop that marks the true summit. The north summit stands at a height of 870.7m (2,857 ft) and the south summit stands at a height of 858.4m (2,816 ft).

The three summits are tightly grouped around a small corrie (glacial cirque), but their form is due to large-scale landslipping, not ice erosion. The North Peak is deeply fissured, with climbing routes caving up through it. The Summit and South Peak are the remnants of a ridge which has visibly slipped away into Glen Croe, making much of the west side hazardous or impassable.

== Available paths ==
The most common route starts from the village of Succoth, at the head of Loch Long. Originally, the route first headed directly up the hillside, following the remains of an old tramway built as part of a water collection scheme. A newly constructed path has now been built, by-passing the tramway and zig-zagging up the hillside to give a more gentle ascent through an area of forestry. This path meets up with the old tramway path and continues from there, following a burn (stream) known as the Allt a' Bhalachain. From here the path bypasses the Narnain Boulders, steepening at around 600 metres (2,000 ft). Nearer the top, the path flattens out at a bealach (mountain pass), which is marked by a cairn. Several peaks may be accessed from this point.

Beside the route described above, the summits may also be reached starting from the A83 Rest-and-be-Thankful road through Glen Croe to the west, by following the rocky south-eastern ridge up from Loch Long, or from the Bealach a' Mhàim. This bealach, at 640 metres (2,100 ft), allows Ben Arthur to be combined with some of the other Arrochar Alps, such as Beinn Narnain and Beinn Ìme.

== Climbing ==
The Cobbler is the most important site for rock climbing in the Southern Highlands, and Scotland's first climbing club was the Cobbler Club, founded in 1866.
