= Ben Donich =

Mountain in Argyll and Bute, Scotland

Coordinates: 56.19785°N 4.87389°W

- Beinn Dòmhnaich
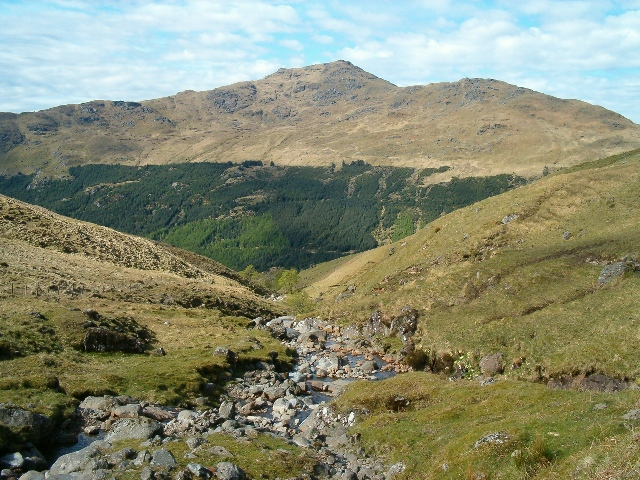
- Ben Donich

Highest point
- Elevation: 846.5 m (2,777 ft)
- Prominence: c. 557 m
- Listing: Corbett, Marilyn

Geography
- Location: Argyll and Bute, Scotland
- Parent range: Arrochar Alps, Grampian Mountains
- OS grid: NN218043

Ben Donich or Beinn Dòmhnaich is a mountain located in the Arrochar Alps, near Loch Goil in Argyll and Bute. It is a Corbett and part of the Ardgoil range with its sister The Brack. The closest settlement to Ben Donich is the village of Lochgoilhead.

At 846.5 metres, Ben Donich is the highest mountain on the Ardgoil peninsula. It is a fairly extensive mountain, essentially a square pyramid with its summit at the centre of four ridges. Ben Donich can be accessed by any of its four ridges, but is almost entirely surrounded by forestry plantations in its lower slopes which makes access difficult. To the north-west a ridge runs down to Gleann Mòr, whilst a further ridge kicks off to the south of the summit, dropping down into the wooded glen containing the Donich Water river. By far the most frequented ridge is the south-east ridge which connects Ben Donich to The Brack via Bealach Dubh-lic at 384 metres where a footpath crosses over the ridge from Glen Croe to Lochgoilhead. A further insignificant ridge leads off the summit ridge to the north-east overlooking Glen Croe and the "Rest and be Thankful" summit on the A83. The slopes are moderate, and terrain is mainly grass with some rocky outcrops on steeper slopes.

The summit (846.5 metres) of Ben Donich, at grid reference NN218043, also boasts an Ordnance Survey trig point.
