= Mountain Rescue Committee of Scotland =

Mountain rescue service for Scotland

Mountain Rescue Committee of Scotland (MRCofS), now known as Scottish Mountain Rescue is the body which represents and coordinates mountain rescue teams in Scotland. It has 27 affiliated mountain rescue teams.

Scottish Mountain Rescue consists of 21 volunteer mountain rescue teams, 2 search and rescue dog associations (SARDA) with over 1000 volunteers, plus an additional 3 police teams, 1 RAF team and Scottish Cave Rescue.

The Mountain Rescue Committee of Scotland (MRCofS) was formed in 1965. It is a registered charity (number SC015257).

In 2011 it received annual funding grant of £312,000 from the Scottish Government. This is distributed between the teams, with the largest grant, £24,000 going to the Lochaber MRT.

Increasingly, the organisation has seen demands for "non-mountain" rescue operations in response to events such as flooding, and searching for missing people. However, a reported split in the organisation in 2016 prompted by this was denied. Later that same year the Cairngorm, Glen Coe, Lochaber and Tayside teams left the organisation to form Independent Scottish Mountain Rescue (iSMR).

== Teams ==
=== Volunteer Mountain Rescue teams ===
- Aberdeen MRT
- Arran MRT
- Arrochar MRT
- Assynt MRT
- Borders SAR Unit
- Braemar MRT
- Dundonnell MRT
- Galloway MRT
- Glenelg MRT
- Glenmore Lodge MRT
- Killin MRT
- Kintail MRT
- Lomond MRT
- Moffat MRT
- Hebrides MRT
- Oban MRT
- Ochils MRT
- Skye MRT
- Torridon MRT
- Tweed Valley MRT

=== Police teams ===
- Police (Grampian) MRT
- Police (Strathclyde) MRT
- Police (Tayside) MRT

=== RAF team ===
- RAF Lossiemouth MRT

=== Search and rescue dog associations ===
- SARDA (Scotland)
- SARDA (Southern Scotland)

==== Drone Search and Rescue ====
- Search and Rescue Aerial Association - Scotland (SARAA-Scotland)

=== Cave rescue teams ===
- Scottish Cave Rescue

== See also ==
- Ben Nevis
- Buachaille Etive Mòr
- Mountains and hills of Scotland
