= Ardgartan =

Coordinates: 56.187269°N 4.7839108°W

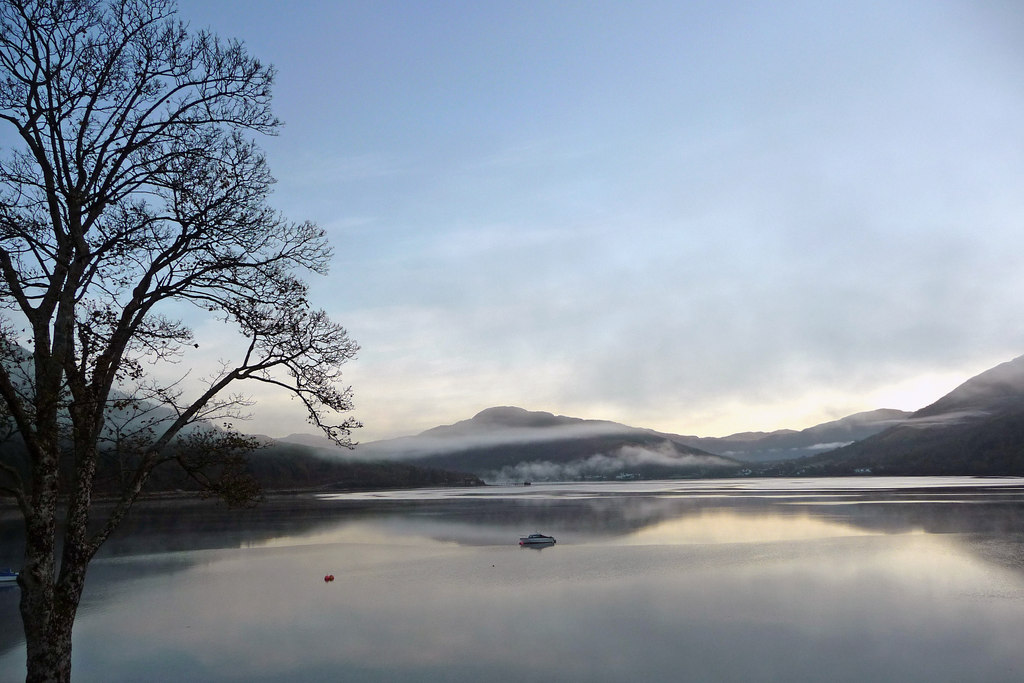
- Loch Long at dawn from Ardgarten campsite

- Location within Argyll and Bute
- OS grid reference: NN 27333 02894
- Council area: Argyll and Bute
- Lieutenancy area: Argyll and Bute
- Country: Scotland
- Sovereign state: United Kingdom
- Post town: Alexandria
- Postcode district: G83
- Dialling code: 01301
- UK Parliament: Argyll, Bute and South Lochaber
- Scottish Parliament: Dumbarton

Ardgartan is a hamlet in Argyll and Bute, Scotland. It is located on the shores of Loch Long at the bottom of Glen Croe.

Ardgartan lies within the Argyll Forest Park which itself is within the Loch Lomond and The Trossachs National Park.

== Ardgartan House ==
The house was used as a youth hostel run by the Scottish Youth Hostels Association and operated for 70 years until it was closed in 2002.
