= Arrochar, Argyll =

Coordinates: 56.200743°N 4.7467273°W

Arrochar: Scottish Gaelic: An t-Àrchar
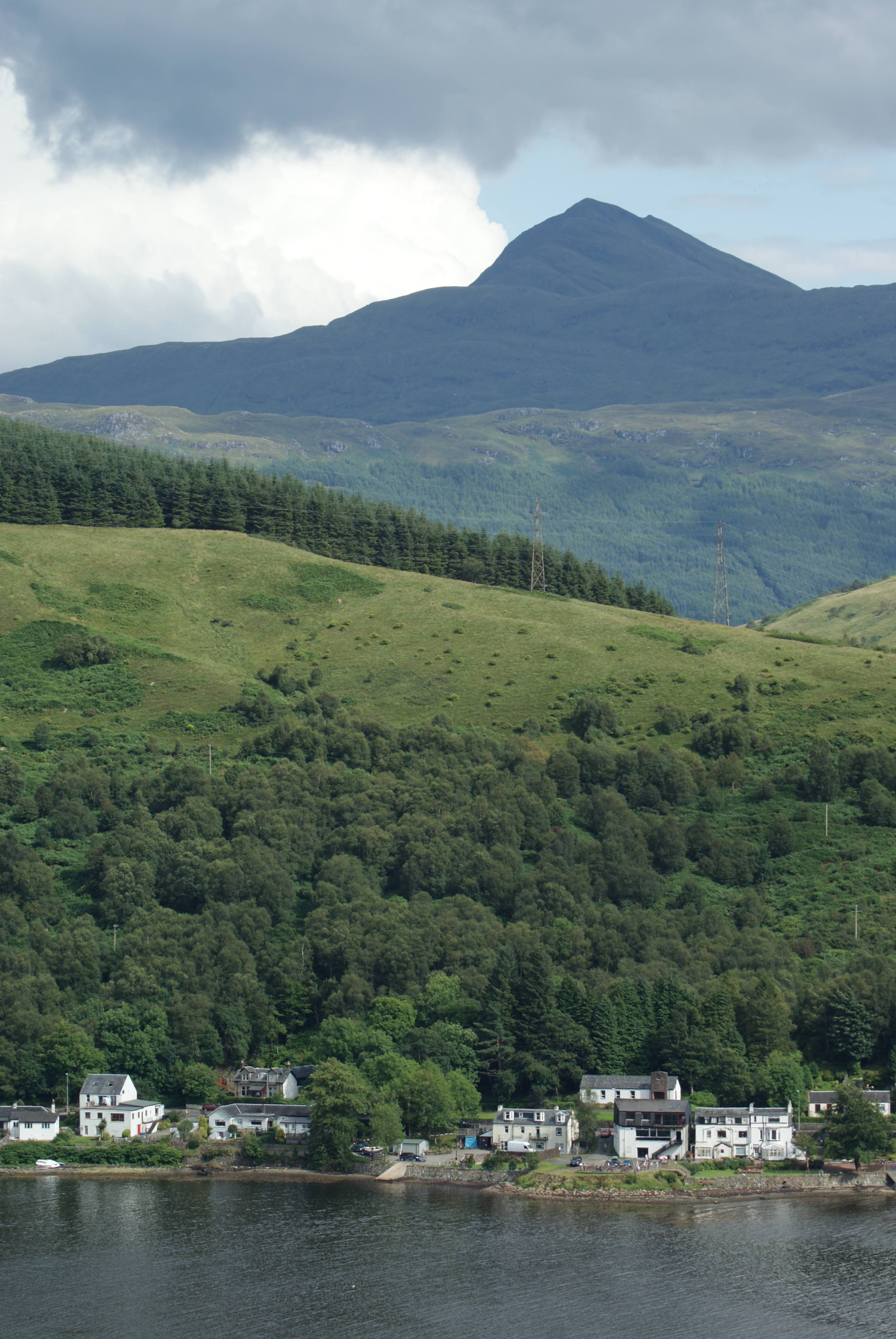
- Arrochar with Ben Lomond behind, taken from the path to the Cobbler

- Location within Argyll and Bute
- OS grid reference: NN 29700 04300
- Council area: Argyll and Bute
- Lieutenancy area: Dunbartonshire
- Country: Scotland
- Sovereign state: United Kingdom
- Post town: Arrochar
- Postcode district: G83
- Dialling code: 01301
- UK Parliament: Argyll, Bute and South Lochaber
- Scottish Parliament: Dumbarton

Arrochar (/ˈærəxər/ ARR-ə-khər; Scottish Gaelic: An t-Àrchar [ən̪ˠ t̪aːɾəɾ] or An Tairbeart an Iar) is a village at the head of Loch Long in Argyll and Bute, Scotland. The Arrochar Alps are named after the village. The village is within the Loch Lomond and The Trossachs National Park.

== Geography ==
Arrochar is overlooked by a group of mountains called the Arrochar Alps, part of the Grampian Mountain range. In particular by the distinctive rocky summit of the Cobbler.

The village is located at the junction of the A83 and A814 roads and is served by Arrochar and Tarbet railway station. In addition the A82 road runs through Tarbet two miles (three kilometres) east.

== Arrochar Mountain Rescue Team ==
The rescue team was set up in the mid 1950s. The team has around thirty voluntary members on call 365 days a year.

== History ==
Arrochar was Historically in the Dunbartonshire area, until boundary changes in 1996.

For over five centuries this area, the feudal barony of Arrochar, was held by the chiefs of Clan MacFarlane and before them by their ancestors the barons of Arrochar. The family is Celtic in the male line.

The settlement was a key target for Viking raiders who took their boats a further two miles (three kilometres) overland to Tarbet to attack the unprotected inland settlements around the shores of Loch Lomond. In 1263 the Vikings were defeated at the battle of Largs.

The Royal Naval Torpedo Testing Station and Range is located at the head of Loch Long. Established in 1912 and decommissioned in 1980. The site is currently part demolished. Demolition has been stalled since a fire on the site in June 2007.

== See also ==
- Arrochar Alps
- List of places in Argyll and Bute
