= A83 road =

Road in Argyll and Bute, Scotland

A83

Route information
- Length: 97.9 mi (157.6 km)

Major junctions
- Northeast end: A82 in Tarbet (NN319044)
- Southwest end: B842 in Campbeltown (NR720204)

Location
- Country: United Kingdom
- Constituent country: Scotland
- Council areas: Argyll and Bute
- Primary destinations: Glasgow, Inveraray, Lochgilphead, Campbeltown

Road network
- Roads in the United Kingdom; Motorways; A and B road zones
← A82	→ A84

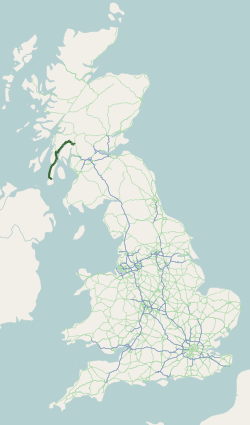
A83 route within Great Britain

The A83 is a major road in the south of Argyll and Bute, Scotland, running from Tarbet, on the western shore of Loch Lomond, where it splits from the A82, to Campbeltown at the southern end of the Kintyre peninsula. The road is best known for its section across the Rest and be Thankful pass through the Arrochar Alps between the heads of Loch Long and Loch Fyne.

== Route ==
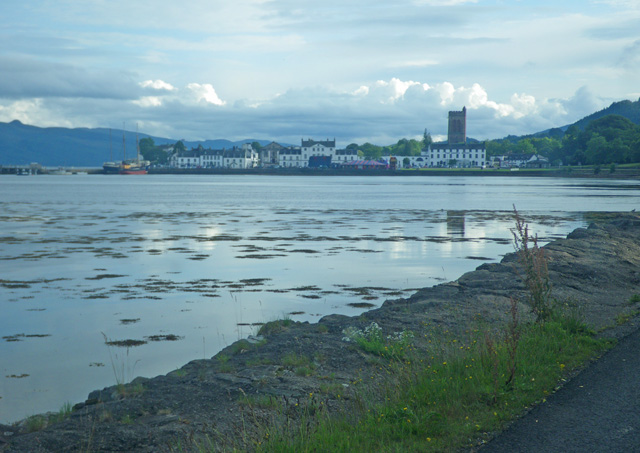
View south along the A83 road over Loch Fyne

From Tarbet the A83 runs west across the watershed between Loch Lomond and Loch Long to Arrochar near the head of Loch Long. It then goes round the head of the loch, and along the western shore for a short distance, before turning northwest through the Rest and be Thankful mountain pass through Glen Croe in the Arrochar Alps, from the shore of Loch Long to that of Loch Fyne. It was near this spot that an RAF Tornado crashed on 2 July 2009.

The words REST & BE THANKFUL are inscribed on a stone near the junction of the A83 and the B828, placed there by soldiers who built the original military road in 1753, now referred to as the Drovers' Road. The original stone fell into ruin and was replaced by a commemorative stone at the same site.

The section is so named as the climb out of Glen Croe is so long and steep at the end that it was customary for travellers to rest at the top, and be thankful for having reached the highest point. The current road no longer keeps to the floor of Glen Croe but steadily climbs across the southern slopes of Beinn Luibhean, on the north side of the Glen, to the highest point of the pass. The westward descent to Loch Fyne is through Glen Kinglas. At Cairndow the A815, the main road down the Cowal peninsula, branches off south to Dunoon and finally Toward at the A815 road end, both on the Firth of Clyde.

On reaching the shore of Loch Fyne, the A83 follows the eastern shore of the loch northwards to its head and then goes south west along the western shore through Inveraray and then on to Lochgilphead and Ardrishaig, where it crosses the entrance to the Crinan Canal.

From Ardrishaig the road continues south to Tarbert, where it crosses over to the western shore of the Kintyre peninsula. In the final section it passes through the villages of Whitehouse, Clachan, Tayinloan, Muasdale and Bellochantuy before finally crossing back to the east of the peninsula, on the Firth of Clyde coast, as it approaches Campbeltown.

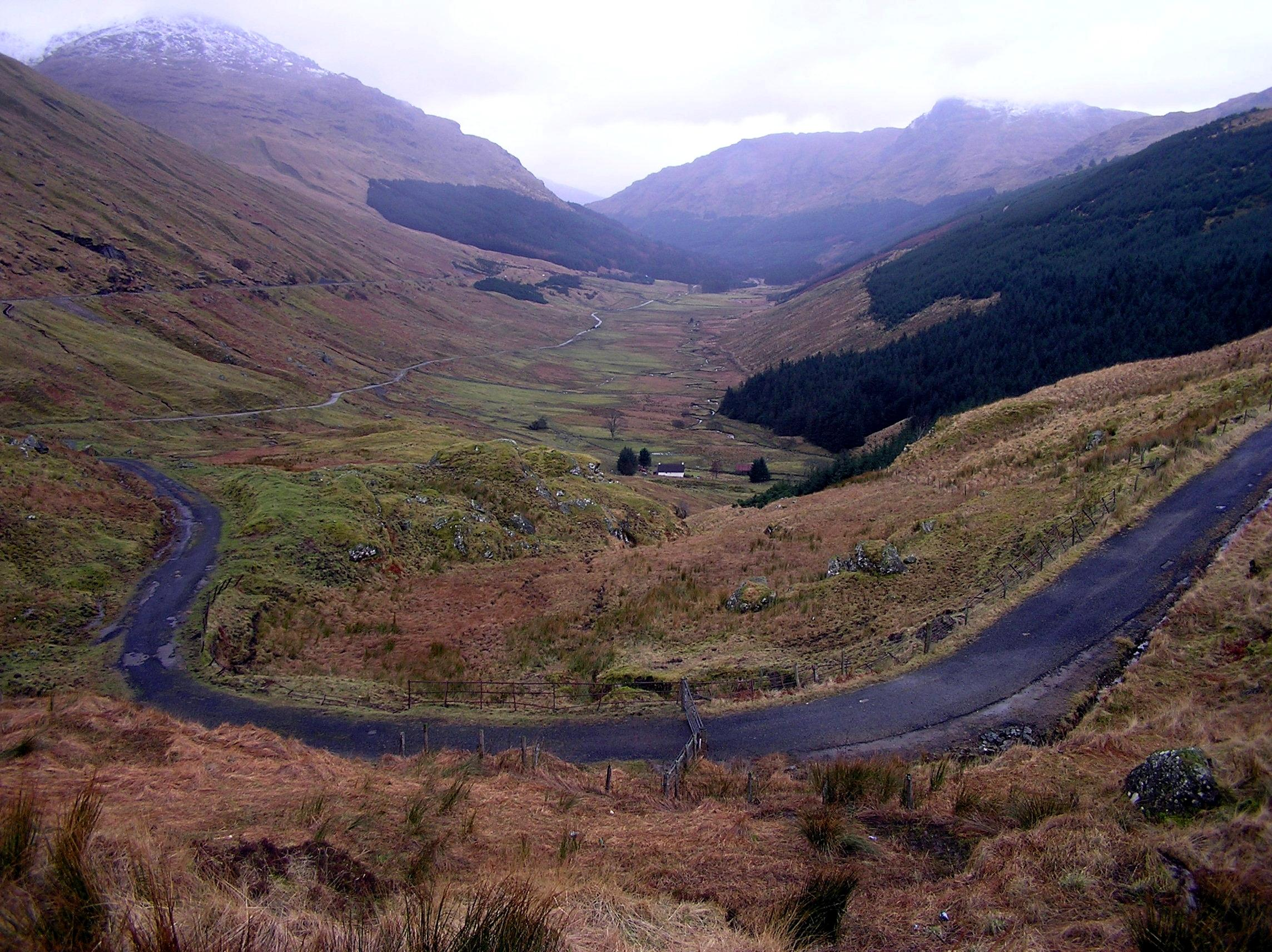
Glen Croe viewed from Rest and be thankful viewpoint

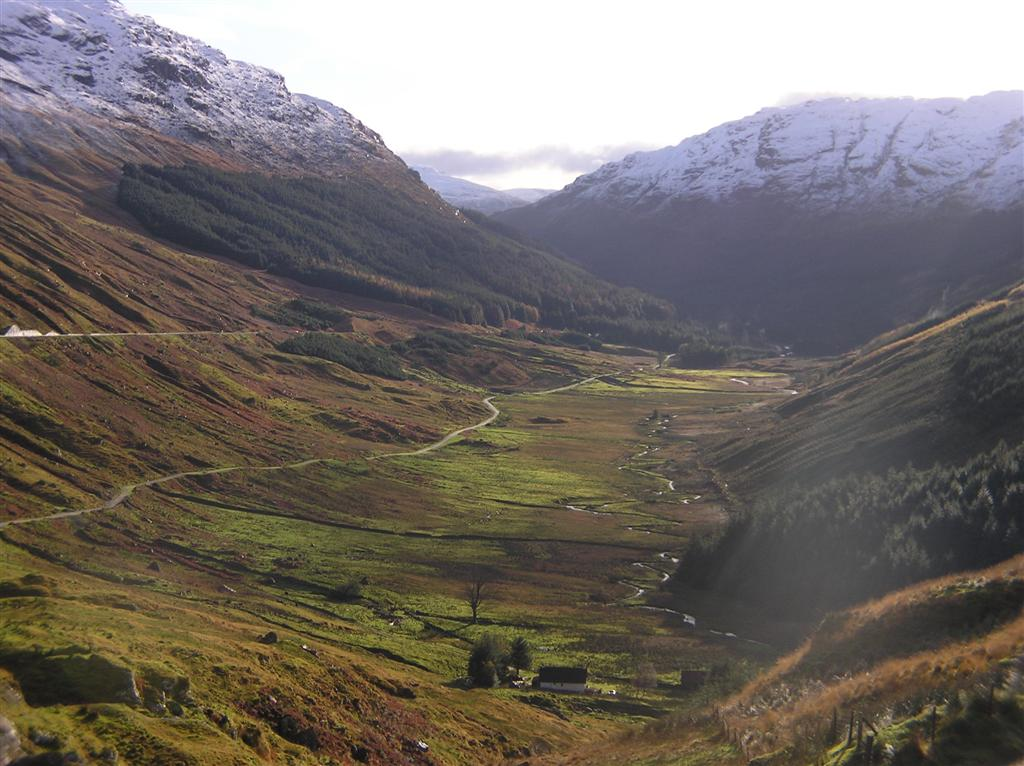
Glen Croe, 18 November 2006

== Rest and Be Thankful closures ==
The stretch south of the Rest and Be Thankful junction has been closed on a number of occasions due to landslides, causing significant disruption to local traffic. The closure results in a 59-mile (93 km) diversion via Crianlarich when the military road is also affected. The many communities affected by the closures of the trunk road are campaigning for a permanent solution to be constructed by Transport Scotland. Suggestions include a rock shed, so future slips flow over the trunk road, and a new road route.

Transport Scotland has, in recent years, spent £80M on landslip prevention schemes, none of which has improved the situation on the trunk road. The many wire slip capture nets and supporting cables have failed on many occasions and some have criticised these, saying they blight the picturesque area.

- The trunk road was closed here due to a 400-tonne landslide on 28 October 2007. The road was partially reopened on Monday 10 November.
- A 1,070 tonne landslide closed the trunk road around noon on 8 September 2009. The road reopened at 15:00 on 10 September 2009.
- A landslip on 1 December 2011 closed the trunk road for 24 hours.
- Another landslip closed the trunk road from 22 February 2012, and an even more substantial landslip in August 2012 resulted in further major delays and closures.
- On 3 October 2013, the trunk road was reopened at 17:30, having been closed between the A815 and the B828 since the previous night.
- On 30 December 2015, Storm Frank caused a 200 tonne landslide; two cars were caught up in the debris but no one was harmed. The trunk road reopened the following afternoon.
- The A83 trunk road closed again for a period of nine days in October 2018, in response to landslides triggered during the start of Storm Callum.
- In August 2020 a landslip happened as the area experienced heavy rains, again closing the trunk road.
- In September 2020, after being re-opened for only five days, a further landslip happened as the area again experienced heavy rains, closing the trunk road.
- In October 2023, after heavy rain, the A83 was closed after seven separate landslides. The road was closed for five days. Ten people were airlifted by helicopter, after becoming trapped between landslips while traveling on the road.

Landslides have become increasingly frequent in recent years despite remediation efforts. In March 2020 Transport Scotland said it was investing in the further construction of catch pits which it hoped would mitigate against landslides along the A83 trunk road route. A 10-year woodland creation project is currently in progress; it is thought that the subsequent ground stabilisation will help prevent further landslides.

In March 2022, Transport Scotland shortlisted five consultants to design a long-term solution to landslip problems on the A83 at Rest and Be Thankful. Five options including tunnelling are being considered. Transport Scotland has looked at Norway's processes and methods for developing and constructing tunnelling projects to deal with conditions similar to those at Rest and Be Thankful.

== Major junctions ==
Council area	Location	mi	km	Destinations	Notes
Argyll and Bute	Tarbet	0.0	0.0	A82 to A85 – Glasgow, Crianlarich, Fort William, Oban	Northeastern terminus
Argyll and Bute	Arrochar	1.6	2.6	A814 south – Helensburgh, Garelochhead	Garelochhead signed northeast only; northern terminus of A814
Argyll and Bute		12.5	20.1	A815 south to A886 – Dunoon, Isle of Bute, Colintraive	Northern terminus of A815
Argyll and Bute	Inverary	23.4	37.7	A819 north to A85 – Oban, Crianlarich	Southern terminus of A819
Argyll and Bute	Lochgilphead	48.0	77.2	A816 north – Oban	Southern terminus of A816
Argyll and Bute	Tarbert	61.1	98.3	A8015 east (Harbour Street) – East Loch Pier, Cowal Ferry	Cowal Ferry signed northeast only; western terminus of A8015
Argyll and Bute	Campbeltown	97.9	157.6	Main Street (B842) / Hall Street – Town centre	Southwestern terminus
1.000 mi = 1.609 km; 1.000 km = 0.621 mi
