= Loch Goil =

- Loch Goil (Scottish Gaelic)
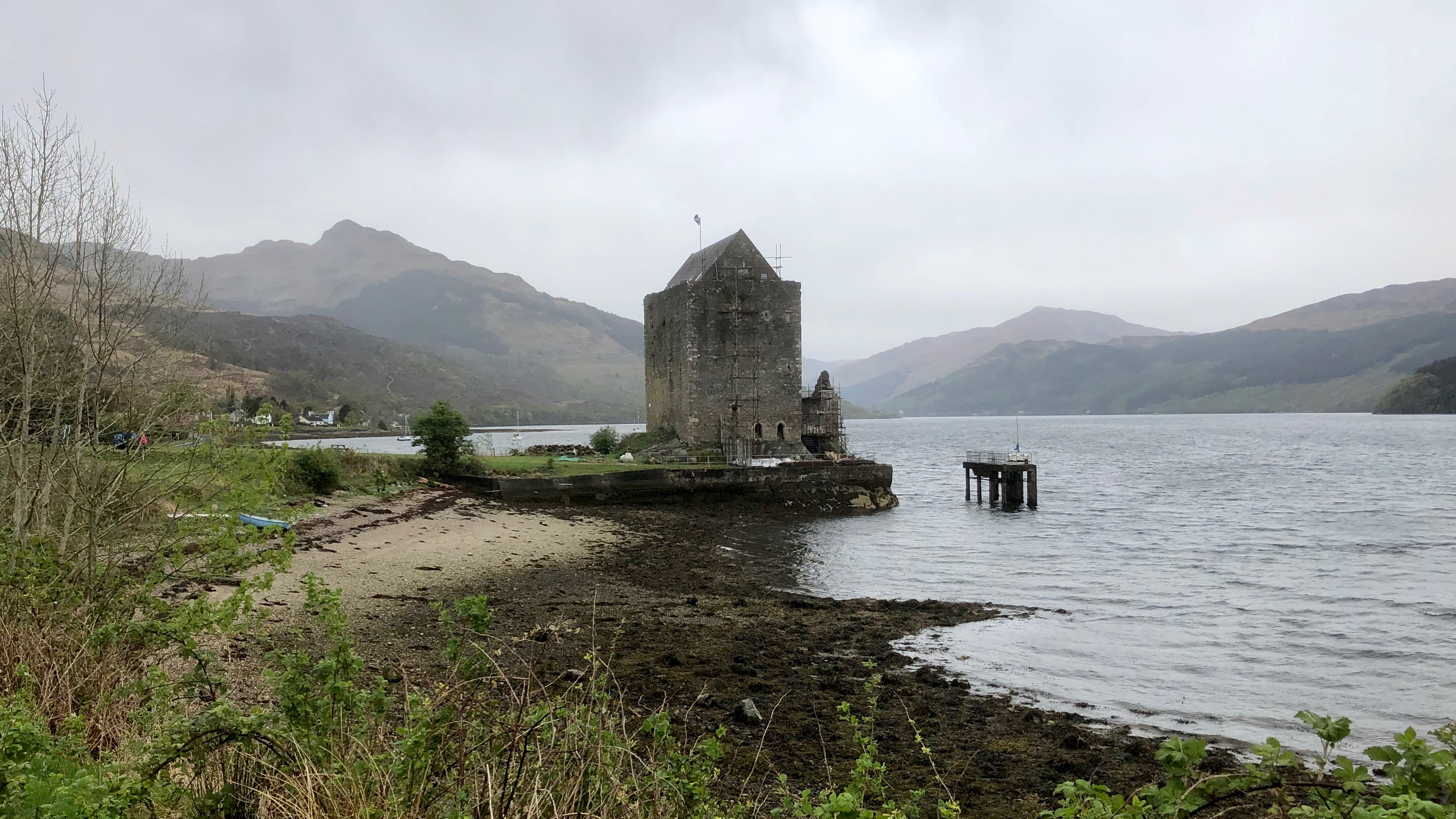
- View up Loch Goil past Carrick Castle

- Location within Argyll and Bute
- Location: Cowal, Argyll and Bute, Scotland, United Kingdom
- Coordinates: 56.131974°N 4.8922978°W, grid reference NS2035197019
- Type: Sea loch
- Basin countries: Scotland, United Kingdom.
- Surface elevation: Sea Level
- Frozen: No

Loch Goil (Scottish Gaelic: Loch Goil) is a small sea loch forming part of the coast of the Cowal peninsula in Argyll and Bute, Scotland. The sea loch is entirely within the Loch Lomond and The Trossachs National Park.

It is an arm of Loch Long. The village of Lochgoilhead stands at its head. Located in the Loch Lomond and the Trossachs National Park, Lochgoilhead sits at the head of Loch Goil, a fjord type sea loch only an hour from the Erskine Bridge, Glasgow Airport the M8 and Glasgow. The village is accessed from the Rest & Be Thankful pass by way of a 6 miles (10 km) single-track road. The area is surrounded by hills and mountains, with loch views, and a range of accommodation, leisure activities and entertainment. Carrick Castle is on the west shore 4 miles (6.4 km) south of Lochgoilhead.

The landscape at Loch Goil shows its remoteness and Highland grandeur with the Arrochar Alps surrounding with conifers in the Highlands of Scotland.

It is used for exercises by Trident submarines from HMNB Clyde at Faslane.

In 2014 Loch Goil was declared a Nature Conservation Marine Protected Area (NCMPA).

== Fisheries ==
Several Scottish Sea Fishing shore records are attributed to the Loch:

Species	Weight	Angler / Year
Gurnard, Streaked	01-06-08	H. L. Smith, 1971
Haddock	06-12-00	G. Stevenson, 1976
Pipefish, Greater	00-01-13	J.C. Ogilvie, 1992
Wrasse, Goldsinny	00-01-13	T. Lambert, 1977
