= Beinn Ìme =

Highest mountain in the Arrochar Alps, in the Southern Highlands of Scotland

Coordinates: 56.23601°N 4.81704°W

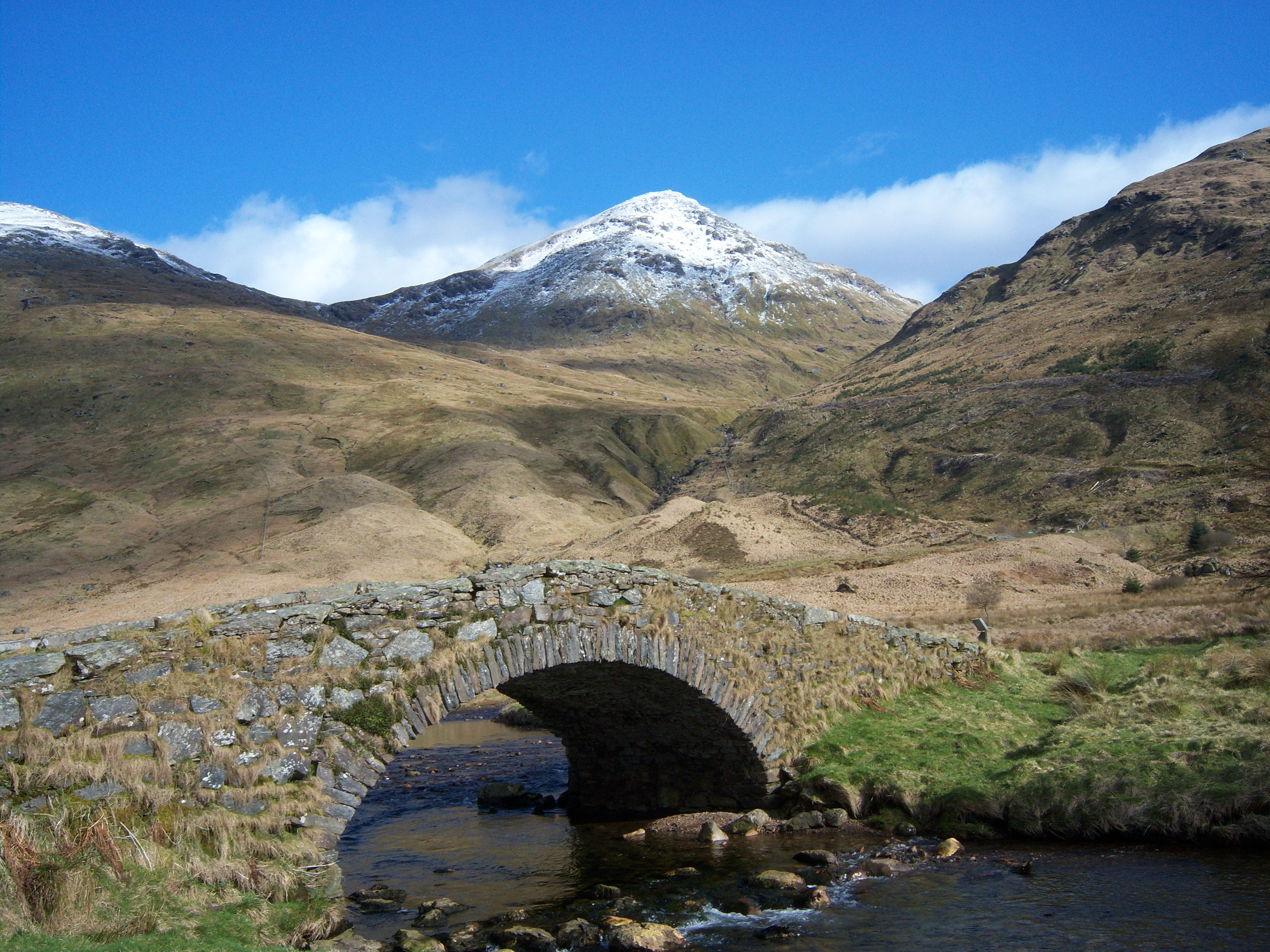
- Beinn Ìme seen from Butter Bridge in Glen Kinglas.

Highest point
- Elevation: 1,011 m (3,317 ft)
- Prominence: c. 696 m
- Parent peak: Ben Oss
- Listing: Munro, Marilyn

Naming
- English translation: Butter Mountain
- Language of name: Scottish Gaelic
- Pronunciation: English: /bɛn ˈiːmə/ ben EE-mə; Scottish Gaelic: [peɲ ˈimə]

Geography
- Location: Argyll and Bute, Scotland
- Parent range: Arrochar Alps, Grampian Mountains
- OS grid: NN255084

Beinn Ìme (Scottish Gaelic for 'Butter Mountain') is the highest mountain in the Arrochar Alps of Argyll, in the Southern Highlands of Scotland. The summit elevation is 1,011 metres (3,317 ft) and it is listed as a Munro.

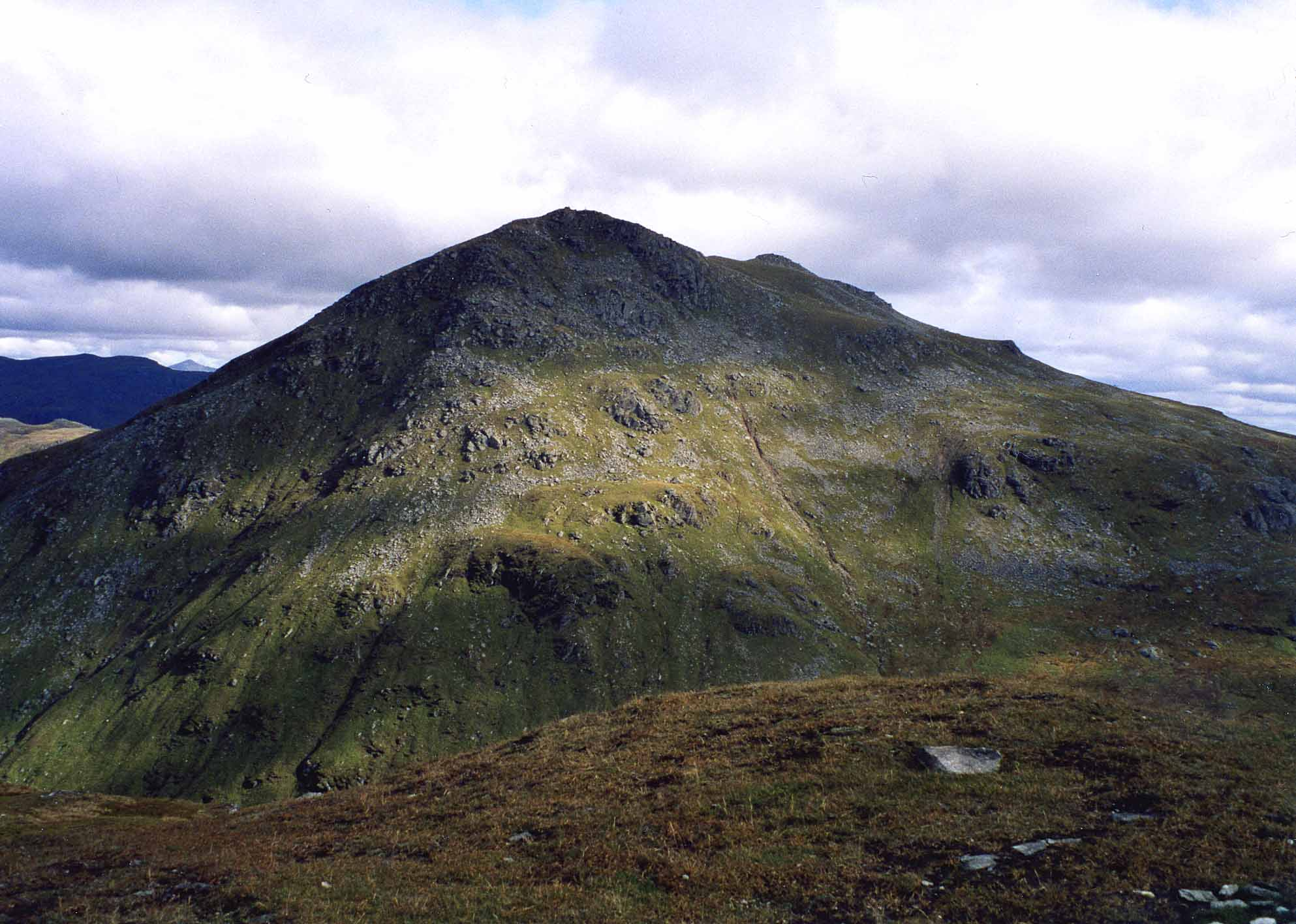
Beinn Ìme seen from the Corbett Beinn Luibhean, 1.5 km to the SW.

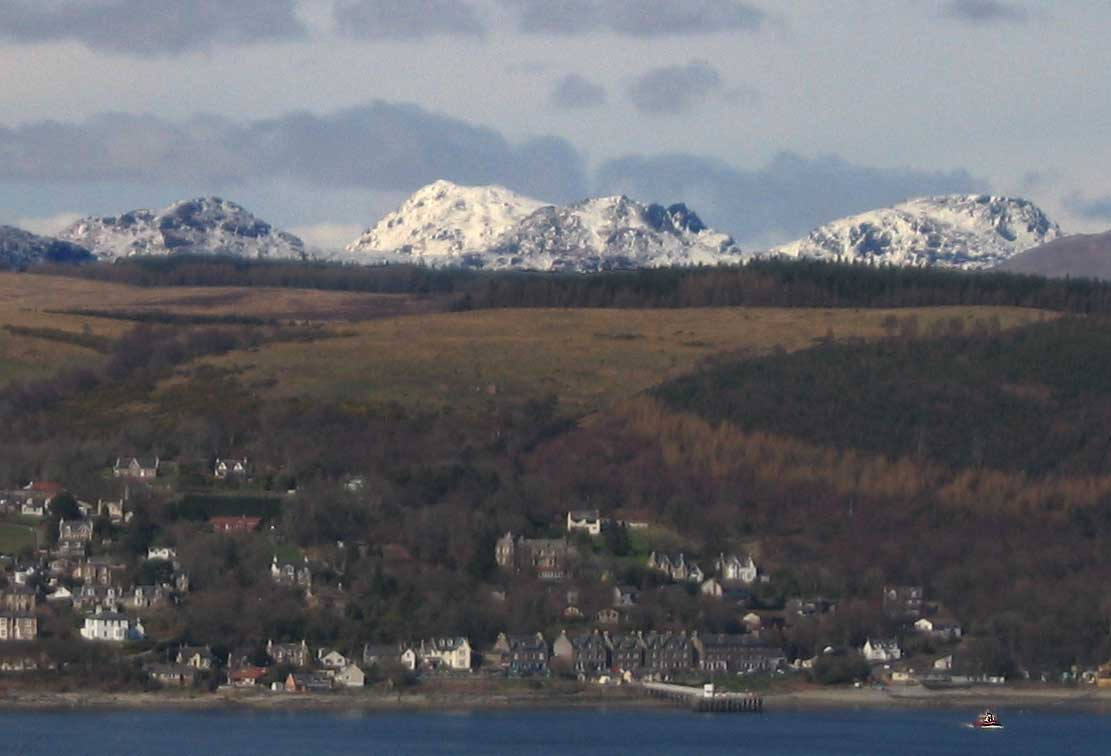
Beinn Ìme is the snowy peak in the centre, with The Cobbler in front and Beinn Narnain further east (right).
