= Lochgoilhead =

Village in Argyll and Bute, Scotland

Coordinates: 56.171974°N 4.9041849°W

Lochgoilhead: Scottish Gaelic: Ceann Loch Goibhle
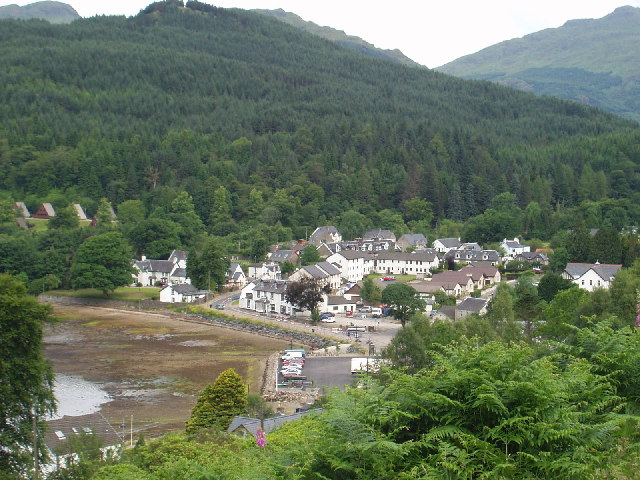
- Lochgoilhead

- Location within Argyll and Bute
- OS grid reference: NN 19800 01500
  - Edinburgh: 100 mi (160 km)
  - London: 376 mi (605 km)
- Council area: Argyll and Bute
- Lieutenancy area: Argyll and Bute
- Country: Scotland
- Sovereign state: United Kingdom
- Post town: CAIRNDOW
- Postcode district: PA24
- Dialling code: 01301
- UK Parliament: Argyll, Bute and South Lochaber
- Scottish Parliament: Argyll and Bute

Lochgoilhead (Scottish Gaelic: Ceann Loch Goibhle, IPA:[ˈkʰʲaun̴̪ˈɫ̪ɔxˈkɤilə]) is a village in Argyll and Bute, Scotland. It is located within the Loch Lomond and The Trossachs National Park. It stands at the head of Loch Goil.

== Location ==
The village is surrounded by several Corbetts in the Arrochar Alps, including Benn Donich, The Brack and Cnoc Coinnich and local waterways are the River Goil and the Donich Water.

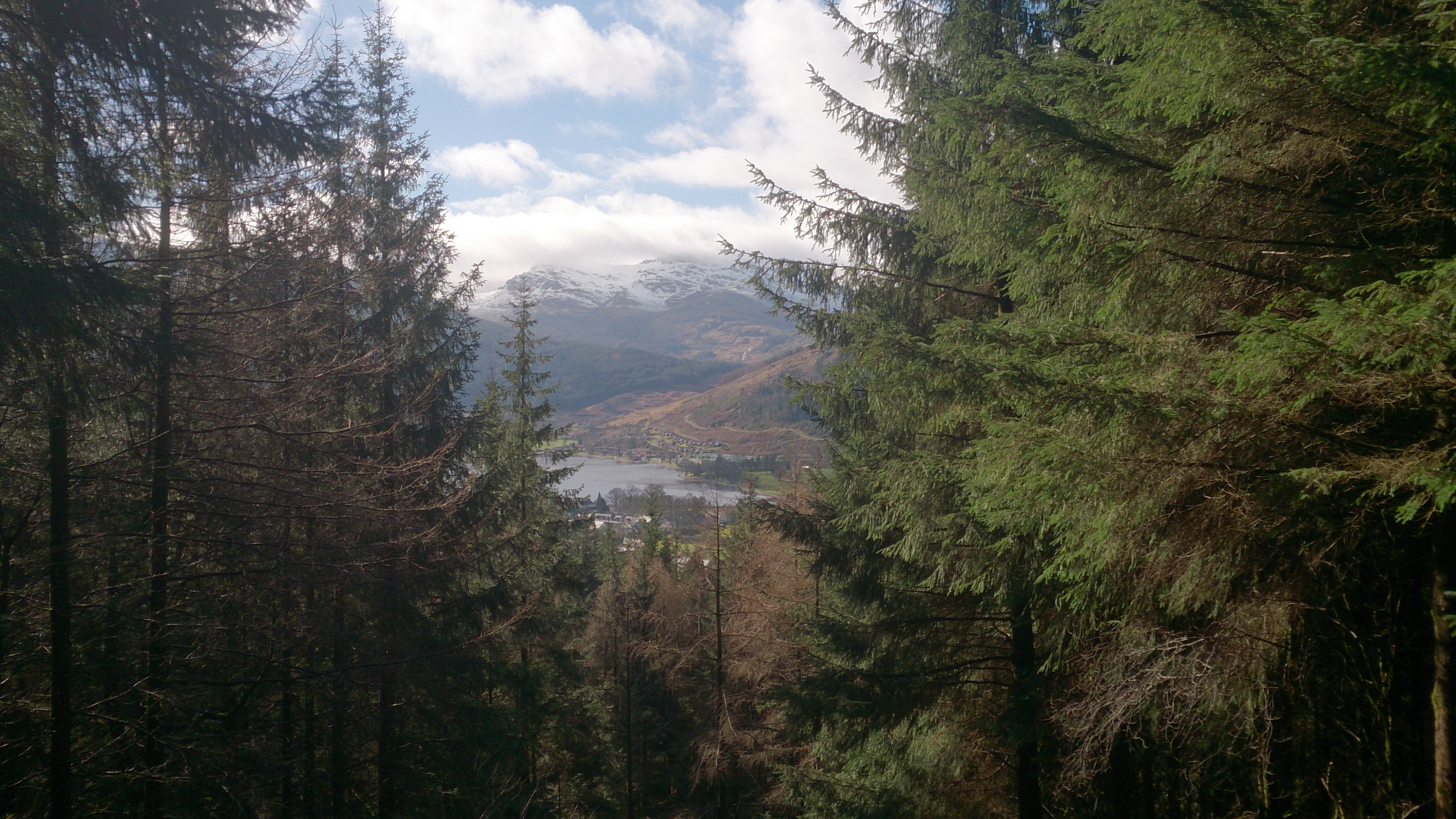
Distant view of Lochgoilhead

The area has been inhabited for over 10,000 years, with the original name for the area being 'Kil nam brathairan' from the Gaelic for 'Church of the brothers'. There are Neolithic remains in the area, including nearby cup marks and a well-preserved corn kiln. The area is associated with the history of Clan Campbell, who drove the Lamonts from the area in the fourteenth century. Lochgoilhead used to be an important stop on the route between Glasgow and Inverary, as travellers would arrive by boat and continue by coach to St Catherine's, where they would board a second boat to cross Loch Fyne.

Lochgoilhead is situated in the Cowal Peninsula and access to the village is either via the A83 with a turning off the 'Rest and be Thankful', or the A815 from Dunoon. Both roads are single track. Travel times from Glasgow, 50 miles (80 km) to the south east, are approximately 90 minutes.

The village has a population of about 400, with around a third of the houses being holiday rental properties or second homes. A large holiday village, Drimsynie Estate Holiday Village, nearly doubles the population of Lochgoilhead in high season. Employment in the area is largely related to agriculture, forestry and tourism, with rates of unemployment at approximately the national average. Rates of self-employment are twice the Scottish average.

The village has a Post Office/Shop and a small Costcutter supermarket. There is a church, a village hall which hosts a number of community events, a primary school and a doctor's surgery. Drinks, meals and accommodation are available at the Goil Inn and at the Shore House. Accommodation and many other amenities such as a gym, swimming pool and restaurants are available at Drimsynie Estate Holiday Village.

The area has many associations with outdoor activities, including one of Scouts Scotland's national activity centres run by Scout Adventures and the Ardroy Outdoor Centre. There are many famous local walks including the Donich Circular and parts of the Cowal way (a view of Lochgoilhead can be seen on the home page for the Cowal Way website). The area is also incredibly rich in wildlife; red squirrel, pine marten, otters, red deer and badgers are common, as well as seals and porpoises in the loch and eagles and buzzards on the hills. Wildcats used to be common in the area but may now be extinct locally.

There are a number of books about local history available, including 'Loch Goil – A slice out of paradise' (the name is a quote from the famous mountaineer WH Murray), 'Loch Goil – looking back' by Iain Smart and Rod/Tricia Philips, and 'The Lochgoil and Lochlong Steamboat Company' by Iain Smart. There is a community website and the local newspaper 'The Wee Goil' is published monthly.

Parts of the film From Russia with Love were filmed locally, and Sean Connery stayed at the Goil Inn (then the Lochgoilhead Hotel). Restless Natives also shows scenes near Lochgoilhead.

== Lochgoilhead Hum ==
A low frequency noise (LFN) was first reported by residents of the village late in 2015. The source of the noise has not been confirmed despite months of effort and investigation, earning the village a place on the World Hum Database. Similar reports of noise have been recorded on this database from Garelochhead and the out-skirts of Helensburgh - near the MOD facility at Faslane. Sound reports taken using specialized equipment (3rd Octave) in Lochgoilhead have measured high decibel, low frequency noise at three locations:

- MOD Noise Range - This range is operated on behalf of the MOD by QinetiQ, and includes a floating lab located in the middle of the loch, between The Lodge and Drimsynie Hotel. Until recently the lab was only occupied during trials, but as of late 2015 substantial new equipment was installed and the lab is now permanently occupied and frequently in use. The volume of MOD traffic on the loch has increased substantially over the last year - submarines and frigates have in fact been spotted/photographed on the loch recently. Sound reports taken on the shore near the lab when it is in use have shown LFN of up to 50 dB.
- Corrow Farm - This farm houses the Estate Office for Drimsynie Hotel and the Head Office for Drimsynie Construction. It is also a working farm, using new generating equipment which run almost constantly and generates LFN of up to 60 dB.
- Waste Water Treatment Works - This plant, operated by ScottishWater, is located at the edge of the village where it expels into the Donich River. When the plant pumps/turbines are in operation LFN of up to 60 dB has been recorded.

== Lochgoilhead Fever ==
An outbreak of non-pneumonic legionellosis due to Legionella micdadei in 1988 became known as Lochgoilhead fever (similar to Pontiac fever), the source of which was traced to a local hotel/spa. Two more minor outbreaks have occurred since - the most recent being in 2006, affecting only one resident and two visitors - following use the facilities at the same hotel/spa.

== Gallery ==
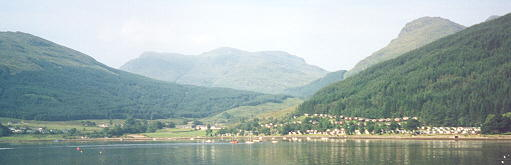
Lochgoilhead. across to the outward bound centre

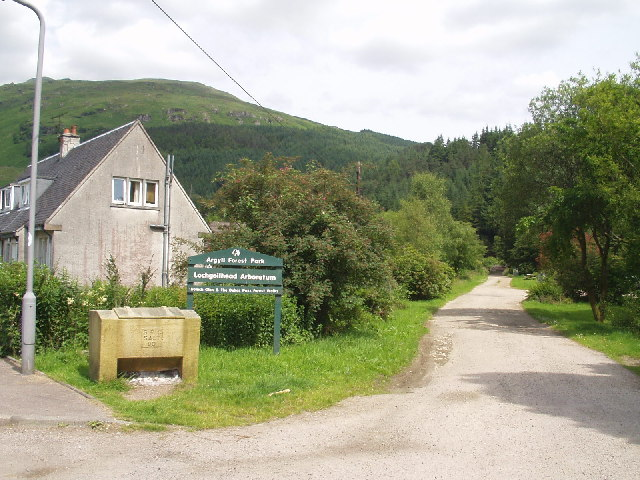
Entrance to Lochgoilhead Arboretum, Argyll Forest Park

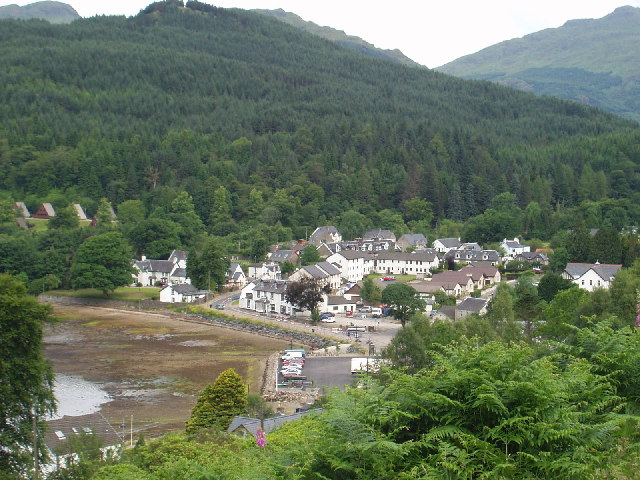
Lochgoilhead
