= Shandon, Argyll and Bute =

Village in Argyll and Bute, Scotland

Coordinates: 56°02′35″N 4°48′20″W

Shandon
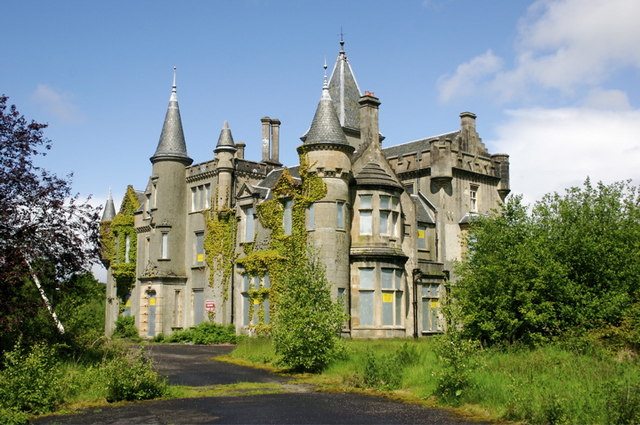
- The former St Andrew's School, Shandon House

- Location within Argyll and Bute
- OS grid reference: NS267840
- Council area: Argyll and Bute
- Lieutenancy area: Dunbartonshire
- Country: Scotland
- Sovereign state: United Kingdom
- Post town: HELENSBURGH
- Postcode district: G84
- Police: Scotland
- Fire: Scottish
- Ambulance: Scottish
- UK Parliament: Argyll, Bute and South Lochaber
- Scottish Parliament: Dumbarton

Shandon is a village on the open sea loch of the Gare Loch in Argyll and Bute, Scotland. Shandon overlooks the Rosneath Peninsula to the west and is bordered by Glen Fruin (Scottish Gaelic: Gleann Freòin) to the east, which is the site of the Battle of Glen Fruin, one of the last clan battles in Scotland, fought on 7 February 1603, in which an estimated 300 warriors on foot from the MacGregor Clan claimed victory over an estimated 600–800 men from the Colquhoun Clan on horse-back. The village of takes its name from the Gaelic name ‘sean dun’, meaning old stronghold, a mediaeval fortification on the hill slope above Balernock.

Shandon is 4 miles (6 kilometres) northwest of Helensburgh, 9 miles (14 kilometres) west of Loch Lomond and 33 miles (53 kilometres) northwest of Glasgow city centre. An affluent small community, it developed alongside other similar settlements in the area in the 19th century, from a hamlet to a fashionable residential area for wealthy Glasgow merchants and several mansion houses still remain. The village lies along the hillside and consists of private residential dwellings. Shandon Castle and Faslane Castle, dating from the Medieval age once occupied prominent positions in the area.

== West Shandon House ==
The engineer Robert Napier became a leading designer and builder of steam engines for ships, and in 1833 bought land near Carnban Point where, by the 1841 census, he had a substantial house called West Shannon built for his family. His business expanded into shipbuilding and he bought more land, then had a palatial residence designed by John Thomas Rochead in Scots–Jacobethan style built there in 1851, using high quality sandstone brought from Bishopbriggs via the Forth and Clyde Canal. This prominent landmark was renowned for housing Napier's extensive art collection. It was bought by a consortium after his death in 1876, and in 1880 opened as a hydropathic institution, then a hotel.

Since the 1960s, His Majesty's Naval Base Clyde has been based between the outskirts of Shandon and the village of Garelochhead at Faslane, and it occupies the whole of the former grounds of West Shandon House.

== Shandon House ==
Designed by Charles Wilson for William Jamieson, and built in 1849. used as a reform school named St Andrew's, from 1965 until 1986. It is currently owned by the Ministry of Defence who had plans to make it into accommodation for Royal Marines serving at the Naval Base nearby. It lies behind Faslane Peace Camp.
