= LRCC =

LRCC can refer to:

- Lakes Region Community College, in New Hampshire, United States
- Law Reform Commission of Canada, a former government-backed law reform group in Canada
- Lomond Roads Cycling Club, a Scottish cycling club
- The London Radio Car Club, which meets at the Crystal Palace National Sports Centre
- The Ladera Ranch Civic Council, a volunteer group in Ladera Ranch, California
- Low Regulatory Concern Chemicals Reforms promulgated by the National Industrial Chemicals Notification and Assessment Scheme
- Leiomyomatosis renal cell cancer
- An alias for Fumarase
- A license granted by the Royal College of Chiropractors
