= Shandon railway station =

Former railway station in Scotland

Shandon
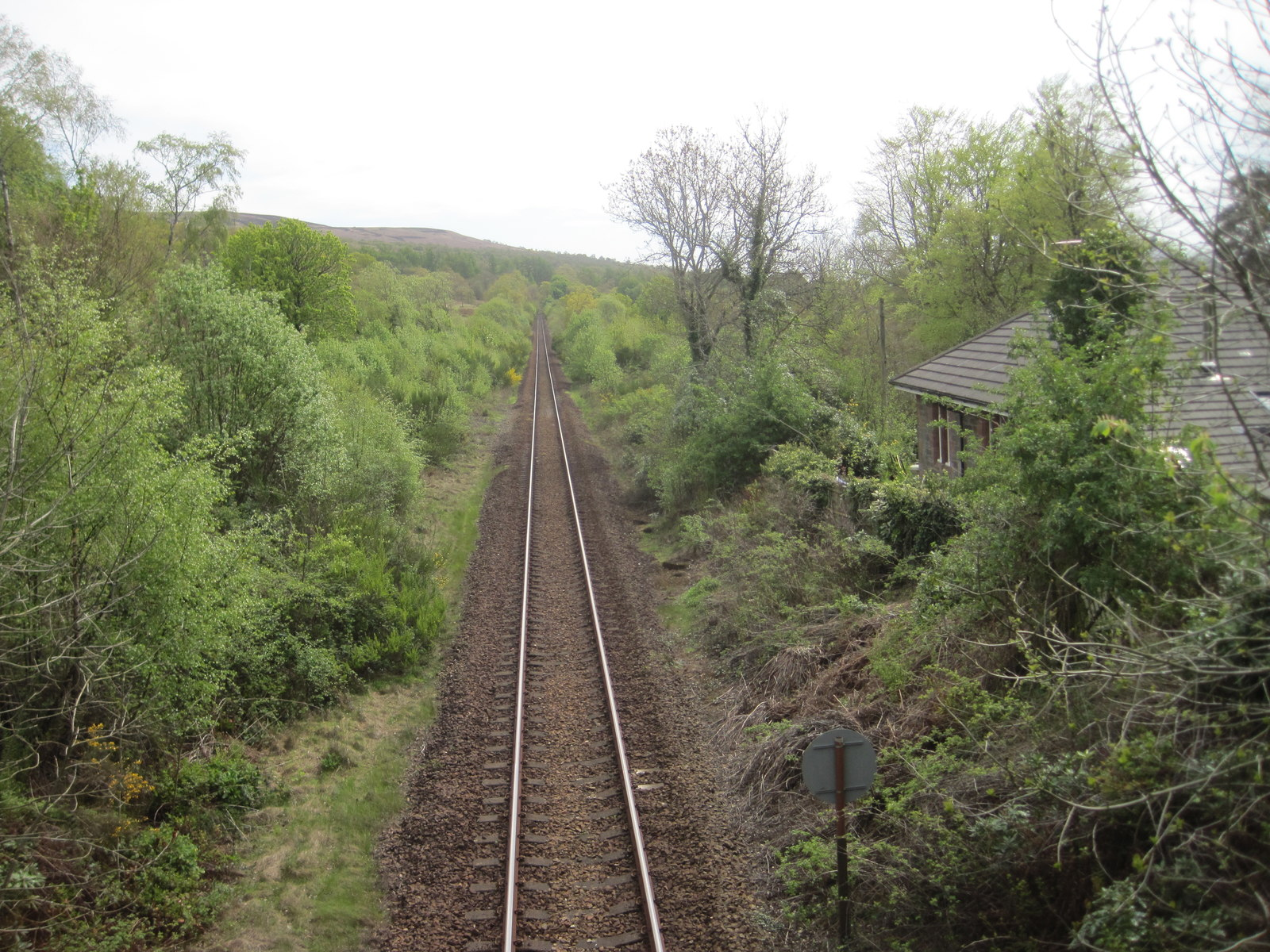
- The site of the station in 2017

General information
- Location: Shandon, Argyll and Bute; Scotland
- Coordinates: 56.0536°N 4.8096°W
- Platforms: 2

Other information
- Status: Disused

History
- Original company: West Highland Railway
- Pre-grouping: North British Railway
- Post-grouping: LNER

Key dates
- 7 August 1894: Station opened
- 15 June 1964: Station closed
Location

Shandon is a closed railway station located at Shandon on the east shore of Gare Loch, in Argyll and Bute. It is located towards the southern end of the West Highland Railway.

== History ==
This station opened to passengers on 7 August 1894.

The station was laid out with a crossing loop around an island platform. There was a siding with a loading bank on the east side of the station. The station was host to a LNER camping coach from 1936 to 1939.

The station closed on 15 June 1964.

There have been proposals to reopen the station as part of an experiment to open ‘pop-up’ stations in Scotland.

== Signalling ==
From the time of its opening in 1894, the West Highland Railway was worked throughout by the electric token system. Shandon signal box, which had 15 levers, was situated at the south end of the island platform.

The signal box and crossing loop were taken out of use on 2 April 1967. The single line was subsequently realigned through the site of the island platform. As a result, very little trace can be seen of this station today, although the loading bank remains.

Preceding station	Historical railways	Following station
Rhu; Line open; Station closed	North British Railway; West Highland Railway	Garelochhead; Line and Station opened

== See also ==
- Faslane Platform railway station - A nearby temporary WWII station
