= Beinn Chaorach (Graham) =

Mountain in Argyll and Bute, Scotland

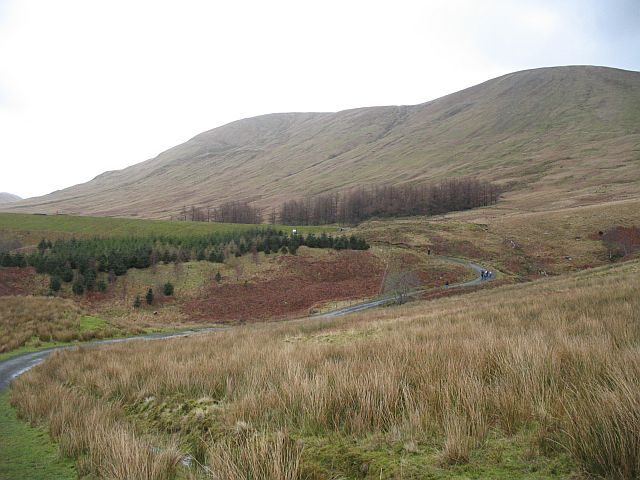
- The grassy slopes of Beinn Chaorach

Highest point
- Elevation: 713 m (2,339 ft)
- Prominence: 381 m (1,250 ft)
- Listing: Graham, Marilyn
- Coordinates: 56°05′36″N 4°45′16″W

Geography
- Location: Argyll and Bute, Scotland
- Parent range: Luss Hills, Grampian Mountains
- OS grid: NS287924
- Topo map: OS Landranger 56

Beinn Chaorach (713 m) is a hill in the southern foothills of the Grampian Mountains of Scotland. It lies in the Luss Hills of Argyll and Bute, between Loch Lomond and Loch Long.

The most southerly of the Luss Hills, this grassy peak is often climbed in conjunction with its neighbour Beinn a' Mhanaich, although Ministry of Defence land lies to the west of the summit, so this side should be avoided.
