= Glen Douglas =

Valley in Argyll and Bute, Scotland

Coordinates: 56.15°N 4.72°W

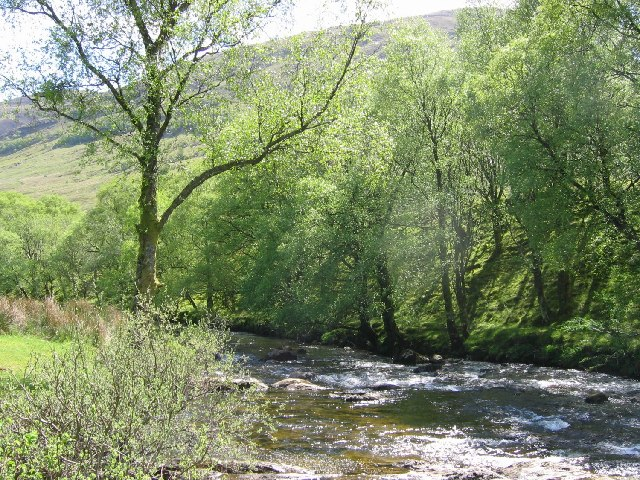
Douglas Water

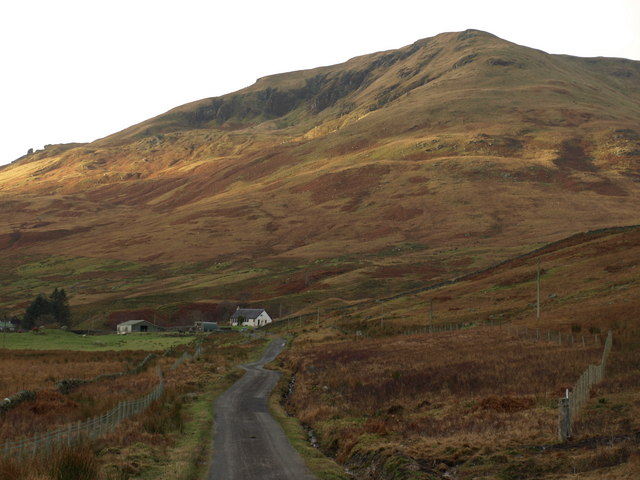
The single-track road near Glen Douglas

Glen Douglas (Scottish Gaelic: Gleann Dùghlais) is a glen in the southwest Scottish Highlands. It is drained by the Douglas Water, which discharges at the village of Inverbeg at its eastern end into Loch Lomond. The glen is followed by a single-track road which links the A82 road alongside Loch Lomond with the A814 road beside Loch Long. The glen is overlooked to the north by Beinn Bhreac (681 m or 2,234 ft) and Tullich Hill (632 m or 2,073 ft) and to the south by Doune Hill (734 m or 2,408 ft) and a 655 m (2,149 ft) hill known as Coire na h-Eanachan.

At the upper (western) end of the glen is the DM Glen Douglas military munitions depot which is connected to the railway line from Helensburgh to Crianlarich at the site of the old station. Glen Douglas has 3 farms two of which are still in use and both are named after hills in the Glen - Doune farm and Tullich Farm.

== See also ==
- Glen Douglas Halt railway station
