= Luss Hills =

Scottish hill range

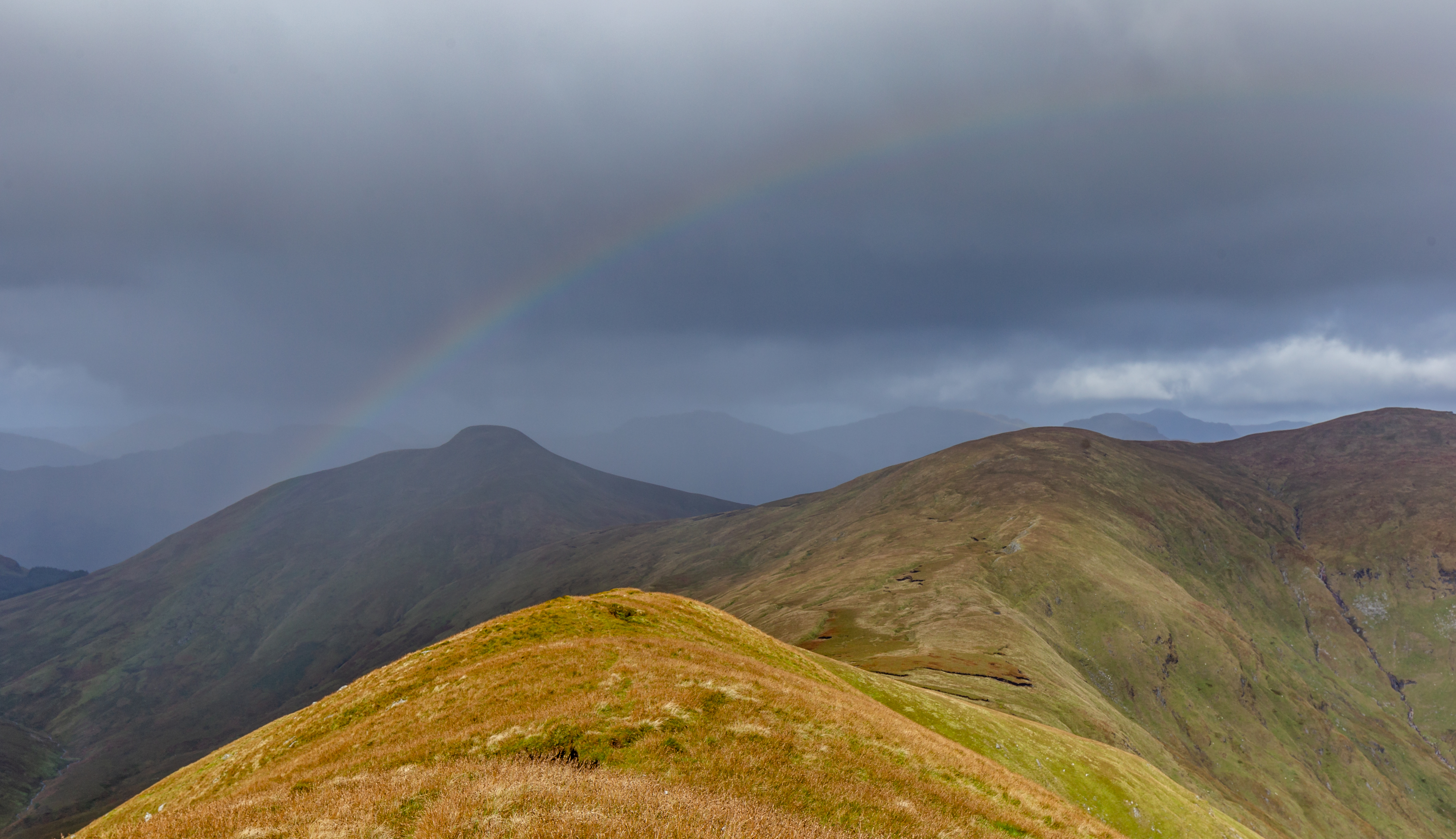
- Rainbow over the Luss Hills

Highest point
- Peak: Doune Hill
- Elevation: 734 m (2,408 ft)
- Coordinates: 56°08′06″N 4°45′12″W

Geography
- Location within Scotland
- Country: Scotland
- Region: Argyll
- Parent range: Grampian Mountains

The Luss Hills are a hill range located in Argyll, Scotland. They are part of the southern foothills of the Grampian Mountains and lie west of Loch Lomond, above the village of Luss in the Loch Lomond and The Trossachs National Park.

A popular destination for hillwalking, the highest peak in the range is Doune Hill at 734 m. Other Hills include Beinn Eich, Beinn Dubh and Mid Hill.

The heights of the individual peaks, as classified by the Scottish Mountaineering Club (SMC) are as follows:

- Doune Hill - 734m
- Beinn Chaorach - 713m
- Beinn a' Mhanaich - 709m
- Beinn Eich - 703m
- Cruach an t-Sidhein - 684m
- Mid Hill - 657m

== Boundaries ==
The Luss Hills are bordered to the north by Glen Douglas, which runs from Loch Long to Loch Lomond, in the West it is first bordered by Loch Long, then by the beginings of the Fruin water, which becomes the southern boundary of Glen Fruin. It's eastern boundary is Loch Lomond
