= Garelochhead Training Area =

Military training camp near Garelochhead, Scotland

- Garelochhead
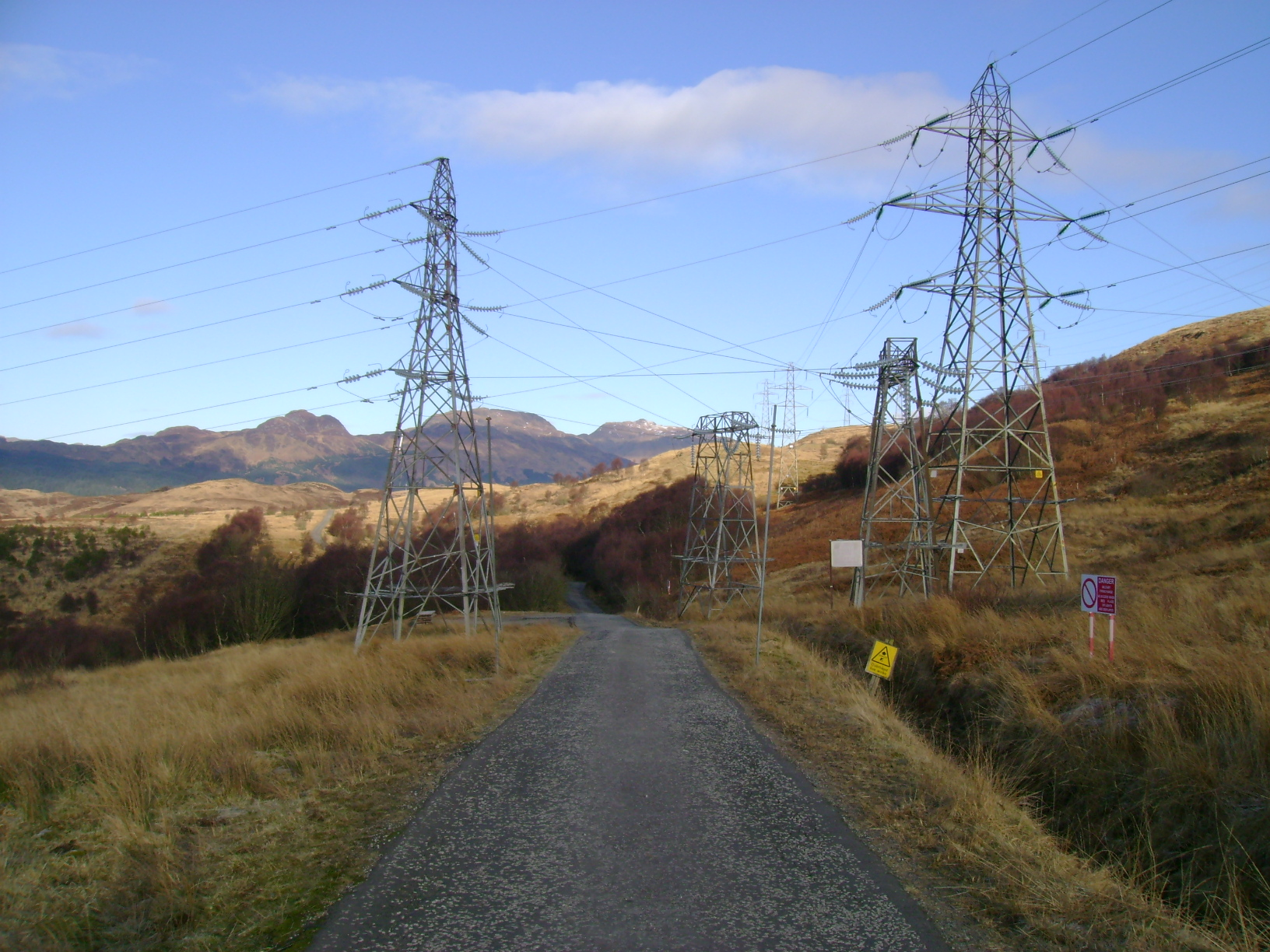
- Military access road to the training area

Site information
- Type: Training Area
- Owner: Ministry of Defence
- Operator: British Army

Location
- Location within Argyll and Bute
- Coordinates: 56°04′24″N 04°49′17″W

Site history
- Built: 1940
- Built for: War Office
- In use: 1940-Present

Garelochhead Training Area is a military training area located near Garelochhead in Scotland.

== History ==
The camp was originally built in 1940 during World War II. Some 22,000 American servicemen were accommodated and trained at the camp prior to Operation Overlord. There is an extensive Training Area in the surrounding region that extends up Glen Fruin to the west bank of Loch Lomond and along Loch Long through Glen Mallan to DM Glen Douglas. The entire training area is some 8,200 acres (33 km^{2}) in area, with its highest point rising to some 700m above sea level and includes two parachute Drop zones. The Range complex at Garelochhead is equipped for live firing up to platoon level, with additional grenade and mortar ranges. The camp itself can accommodate up to 500 personnel and has been used as a base by Strathclyde Police during protests at the nearby HMNB Clyde.

The Ministry of Defence built a new 100m grouping and zeroing range, a new 600m electronic firing range, a range warden's complex, a range console building and access tracks at the camp in 2014.

In August 2022, the Ministry of Defence announced plans to demolish the existing accommodation and replace it with modern energy efficient accommodation.
