= Beinn Bhreac =

Beinn Bhreac (Gaelic for "speckled hill") is a name shared by a number of Scottish hills and mountains:

- Beinn Bhreac (Glen Derry) (933 metres or 3,061 feet), a Munro in the Cairngorms
- Beinn Bhreac (Blair Atholl) (912 metres or 2,992 feet), a Marilyn in the Cairngorms
- Beinn Bhreac (Barcaldine) (726 metres or 2,382 feet), a Marilyn in the Southern Highlands
- Beinn Bhreac (Arrochar) (681 metres or 2,234 feet), a Marilyn in the Southern Highlands
- Beinn Bhreac (Broom) (667 metres or 2,188 feet), or "Meall Dubh", a Marilyn in the Highlands
- Beinn Bhreac (Arran) (575 metres or 1,886 feet), a Marilyn on the Isle of Arran
- Beinn Bhreac (Inveraray) (526 metres or 1,726 feet), a Marilyn in the Western Highlands
- Beinn Bhreac (Kyles of Bute) (519 metres or 1,703 feet), a Marilyn in the Western Highlands
- Beinn Bhreac (North Jura) (467 metres or 1,532 feet), a Marilyn on Jura
- Beinn Bhreac (Minginish) (445 metres or 1,460 feet), a Marilyn on the Minginish peninsula, Isle of Skye
- Beinn Bhreac (Paps of Jura) (441 metres or 1,447 feet), a Marilyn on Jura
- Beinn Bhreac (Waternish) (329 metres or 1,079 feet), a Marilyn on the Waternish peninsula, Isle of Skye
- Beinn Bhreac (Moidart) (240 metres or 790 feet), a Marilyn in the North-west Highlands
- Beinn Bhreac (Lewis) (191 metres or 627 feet), a Marilyn on the Isle of Lewis

== See also ==
- Binn Bhreac or Benbrack, (582 metres or 1,909 feet), a Marilyn in the Twelve Bens range, in Connemara, in Ireland
