= Tullich Hill =

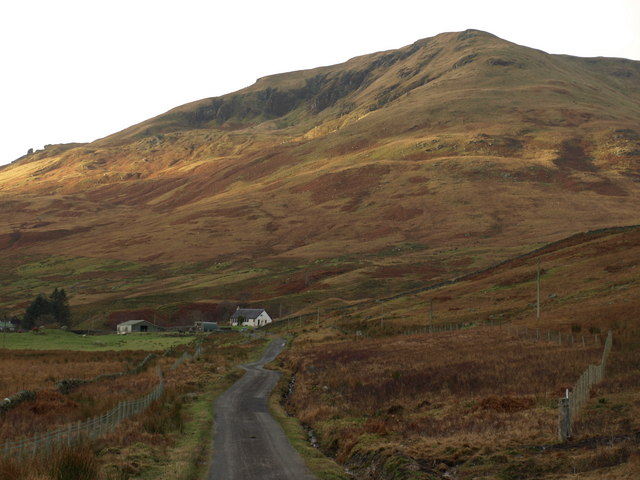
- Tullich Hill from Glen Douglas

Highest point
- Elevation: 632 m (2,073 ft)
- Prominence: 273 m (896 ft)
- Listing: Graham, Marilyn
- Coordinates: 56°10′04″N 4°45′00″W

Geography
- Location: Argyll and Bute, Scotland
- Parent range: Grampian Mountains
- OS grid: NN293006
- Topo map: OS Landranger 56

Tullich Hill (632 m) is a hill in the southern Grampian Mountains of Scotland. It lies south of the village of Arrochar, between Loch Long and Loch Lomond in Argyll.

An irregular, rocky hill, its most distinguished feature is the corrie on its southern slopes.
