= Faslane Bay =

Bay in Argyll and Bute, Scotland

Coordinates: 56°3′53″N 4°49′20″W

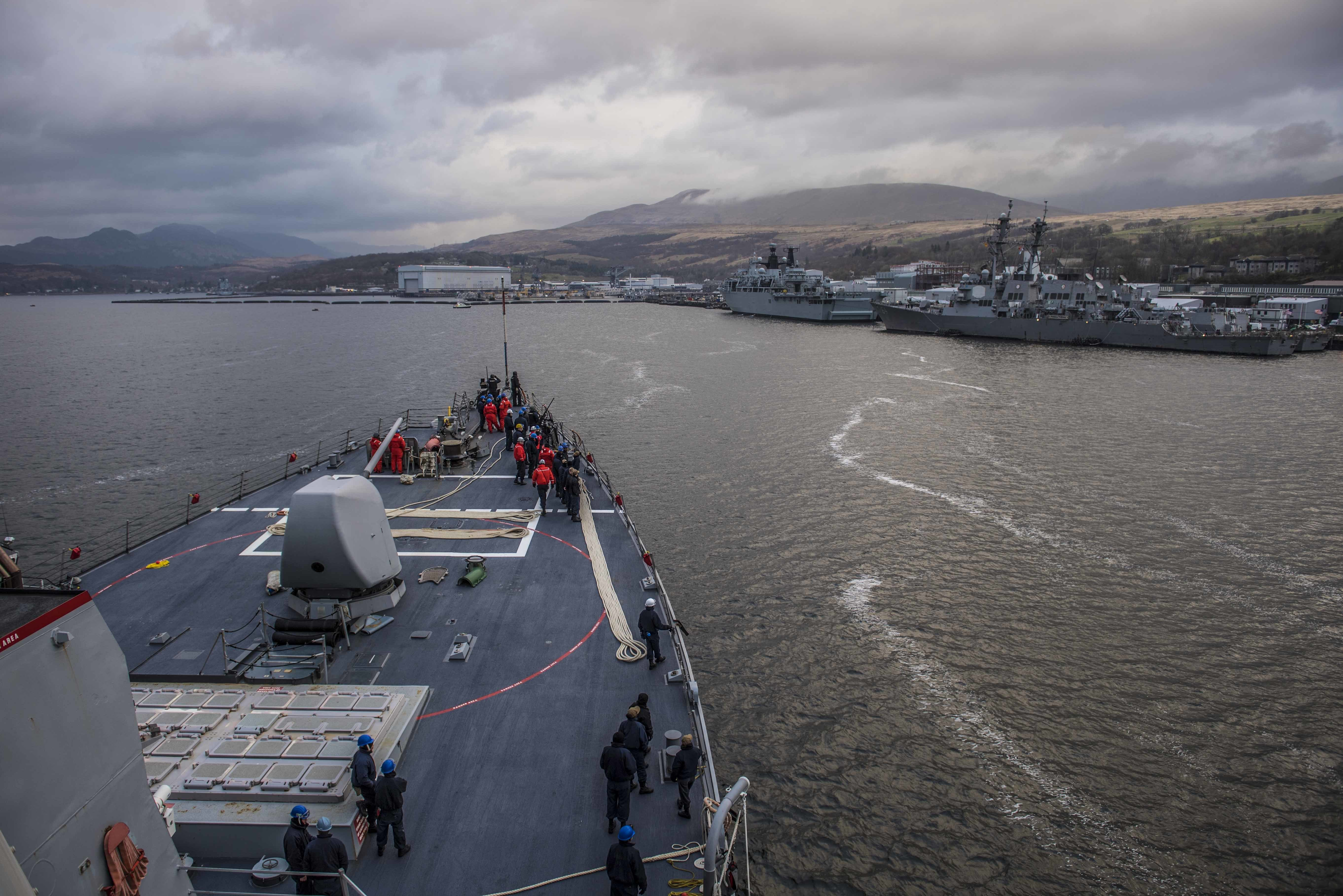
View of the bay from the bridge of a US destroyer

Faslane Bay is a bay on Gare Loch, an inlet of the Firth of Clyde, in Argyll and Bute, Scotland. It is the site of HM Naval Base Clyde, the home of the Royal Navy's submarine fleet.

The immediate area was sparsely populated until the naval base was established during World War II, though Garelochhead was already a thriving village served by Clyde steamers and a railway station. A shipbreakers operated at Faslane until the mid-1980s, when its site was taken over for the expansion of the naval base.

== See also ==
- Faslane Castle, a now vanished castle in the area
