= Rosneath Peninsula =

Peninsula in Argyll and Bute, Scotland

- Peninsula
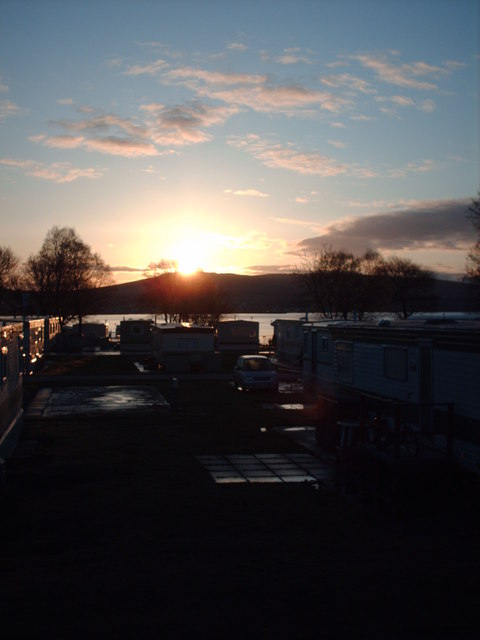
- Sunrise Over Rosneath

- Location within Scotland
- Coordinates: 56.025250°N 4.8446960°W
- Grid position: NS 22818 85022
- Location: Argyll and Bute, Scotland

The Rosneath Peninsula is a peninsula in Argyll and Bute, western Scotland, formerly in the historic county of Dunbartonshire. The peninsula is formed by the Gare Loch in the east, and Loch Long in the west; both merge with the upper Firth of Clyde.

== Geography ==
It is approximately 7 miles (11 kilometres) long (as measured from the head of the Gare Loch) and 3.5 miles (5.5 kilometres) across at its widest point. The 56th parallel north runs through the southern end of the peninsula.

=== Highland Boundary Fault ===
The Highland Boundary Fault bisects the peninsula.

== History ==
=== Name ===
The name of the peninsula is thought to be derived from Gaelic Ros Neimhidh, meaning "headland of the sanctuary".

=== Rosneath Castle ===
Rosneath Castle had stood since the medieval period, at least the 12th century. It was built on a rock outcrop overlooking Castle Bay. The building was attacked by William Wallace while under English control. The castle was destroyed by a fire on 30 May 1802 and the site was cleared. The site is now occupied by Rosneath Castle Park.

=== Rosneath House ===
Rosneath House, built 1803–06, was for a time the residence of Princess Louise, Duchess of Argyll, the daughter of Queen Victoria. The house was a military base during World War II and was where Operation Torch was planned. As with many castles and grand houses in the area, the house has been demolished.

=== Knockderry Castle ===
Knockderry Castle is located in Cove. It was designed by Alexander "Greek" Thomson in the 1850s.

== Education ==
Kilcreggan Primary School is non-denominational and co-educational.

Rosneath Primary School was mostly built in 1967.

== Religion ==
There has been a Christian presence on the peninsula from an early date.

St.Modan's Parish Church in Rosneath opened for public worship on 11 September 1853. It was named after Saint Modan on 14 June 1982.

Craigrownie Parish Church, which was completed in 1853, serves the communities of Ardpeaton, Cove and Kilcreggan.

St. Gildas R.C. church is in Rosneath and opened in 1968. It is named after Gildas the Albanian.

Barbour Cemetery is a 20th-century cemetery in Ardpeaton, where the families in the Rosneath Peninsula that had no right of burial in Rosneath churchyard could be interred.

== Settlements ==
The peninsula's settlements, round the coast from the top of the east coast to the top of the west coast, are:

- Mambeg
- Rahane (overlooks His Majesty's Naval Base Clyde).
- Clynder
- Rosneath
- Kilcreggan (location of the passenger ferry connection to Gourock, Inverclyde).
- Cove
- Ardpeaton
- Coulport (home to a Royal Navy Armaments Depot).

=== Historical ===
During the Victorian era, from 1850 onwards, the large contiguous villages of Cove and Kilcreggan were developed, with luxurious summer villas in attractive coastal settings for the wealthy of the greater Glasgow area, so that businessmen and their families could enjoy the fresh air. Piers built at Cove and Kilcreggan had Clyde steamer services taking business and leisure commuters to railway terminals such as Greenock Princes Pier railway station, or on more leisurely steamer trips down the Firth of Clyde and up river into Glasgow.

== Transport ==
=== Road ===
The B833 road runs from Garelochhead to Coulport. It follows the shoreline, but two roads cross the peninsula: both un-numbered, one for local traffic from Ardpeaton to Rahane, the other considerably larger and mainly designed for military traffic between Coulport and Faslane.

=== Ferry ===
The Caledonian MacBrayne service operates from Gourock in Inverclyde to Kilcreggan on the peninsula. This service is for foot passengers only.

Preceding station	Ferry	Following station
Terminus	Caledonian MacBrayne; Ferry	Gourock

Travel connections

For foot passengers at Gourock Pier, a ScotRail train service provides access to the National Rail network at Glasgow Central, via the Inverclyde Line.

== Sport and recreation ==
The PS Waverley calls at Kilcreggan pier during its summer season on the Firth of Clyde coast.

More recently, the area has become a popular destination for cyclists as it is possible to do a circular tour of the peninsula using the military road.

== See also ==
- List of peninsulas
- List of places in Argyll and Bute
