= Ardpeaton =

Settlement in Argyll and Bute, Scotland

Coordinates: 56.028109°N 4.865649°W

Ardpeaton is a settlement on the Rosneath Peninsula in Argyll and Bute, west of Scotland. On the east shore of Loch Long. The population is under 1000.
