= Battle of Glen Fruin =

Scottish clan battle on 7 February 1603

Coordinates: 56°3′59″N 4°46′11″W

The Battle of Glen Fruin
- Part of the Scottish clan wars
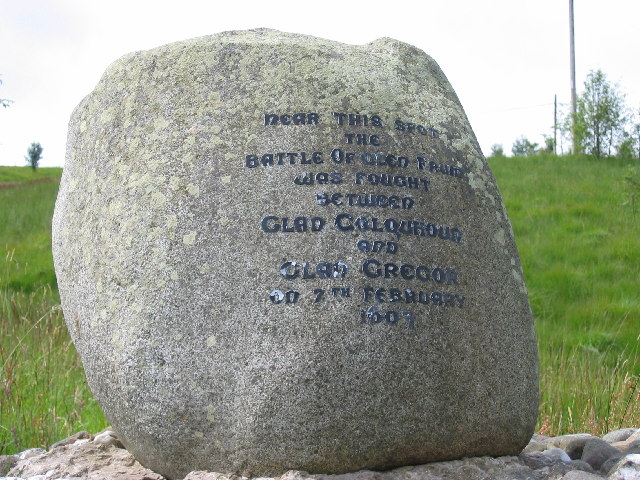
- Monument marking the site of the Battle of Glen Fruin
Date	7 February 1603
Location	Glen Fruin, Scotland grid reference NS27608940
Result	MacGregor victory

Belligerents
Clan Gregor, allied men	Clan Colquhoun, allied men

Commanders and leaders
Allaster MacGregor of Glenstrae	Sir Alexander Colquhoun of Luss

Strength
300–400 combined force	600–800 combined force, including a large proportion of cavalry

Casualties and losses
2 dead (allegedly)	140–200 dead

The Battle of Glen Fruin was a Scottish clan battle fought on 7 February 1603 between the Clan Gregor and its allies on one side, and the Clan Colquhoun and its allies on the other. The Clan Gregor (or MacGregor) and Clan Colquhoun were at feud due to the MacGregors carrying out raids on the Colquhoun's lands. The Colquhouns gained royal support and raised an army against the MacGregors. However, during the subsequent battle of Glen Fruin, the Colquhouns were comprehensively defeated. Glen Fruin is in the Loch Lomond area, in the county of Dunbartonshire, Scotland. In the aftermath of the battle royal policy punished the MacGregors for 150 years.

== Background ==
Archibald Campbell, 7th Earl of Argyll, was responsible for keeping the Clan Gregor under restraint and in January 1593 he had received a commission to charge all those of the surname MacGregor for not keeping the peace. On 5 March 1594 he became bound so that he should keep himself and all those answerable to him to keep his Majesty's peace under surety of £20,000. In July 1596, upon paying a sum of money into the royal treasury, he received a commission as the King's lieutenant in the bounds of Clan Gregor "wherever situated". Subsequently, on 22 April 1601 Allaster MacGregor of Glenstra, chief of Clan Gregor, gave Argyll who was the King's lieutenant, a bail-bond for the whole clan, one clause of which was that any offence committed by the clan was to be understood as a forfeiture of any lands that they possessed. However, despite this, Argyll, instead of repressing the Clan Gregor used his power over them to stimulate them into various acts of aggression against Alexander Colquhoun of Luss, chief of Clan Colquhoun. Among the Luss Papers, there are lists of items stolen by the MacGregors from the Colquhouns in the year 1594 and in other years previous to this up to 1600, showing how much the Colquhouns had suffered from the MacGregors.

In 1602 the MacGregors began to make more formidable inroads into the lands of Luss and Colquhoun of Luss complained to King James VI of Scotland who despite having passed an Act of Parliament forbidding the carrying of arms, granted permission to Colquhoun and his tenants to wear various offensive weapons. However, the right granted to Colquhoun and his followers to carry arms seems to have caused resentment from the MacGregors and resulted in the conflicts at both Glenfinlas and Glen Fruin. In 1602, Colquhoun made a complaint to the King against Argyll, who as the King's lieutenant in the bounds of Clan Gregor, had permitted the latter and others to commit outrages upon him and his tenants. Argyll was fined under the terms of the bond, but was later acquitted of the charge brought against him because Colquhoun had failed to prove it.

=== Glenfinlas ===
On 7 December 1602, at Glenfinlas, which is a glen about two miles west of Rossdhu and three miles to the north of Glen Fruin which runs parallel to it, a raid was carried out led by Duncan Mackewin MacGregor, tutor of Glenstra, against the Colquhouns. He had with him about eighty men and they plundered the houses and took away three hundred cows, one hundred horses and mares, four hundred sheep, and four hundred goats. Two Colquhouns were killed in the raid, one of them a house-hold servant of Colquhoun of Luss. According to the Clan Gregor account, based on Walter Scott's supposed factual introduction to his 19th-century novel Rob Roy (MacGregor); two MacGregor clansmen, away from home, were forced to spend a night in Colquhoun lands. After being refused shelter, the two MacGregors found an abandoned outhouse and slaughtered a sheep which they ate. When the two were discovered they were seized and brought forward to Colquhoun, the Laird of Luss who had the men tried by summary trial and then executed. Walter Scott also gives this incident as the direct cause of the conflict at Glen Fruin. 19th century historian William Fraser disputes the account given by 17th-century historian Sir Robert Gordon, 1st Baronet in his Genealogical History of the Earldom of Sutherland who strongly favours the MacGregors, representing the Colquhouns as the aggressors and that the Colquhuns had made the first raid. Fraser also states that Gordon mistakes the conflict at Glenfinlas for the more serious one at Glen Fruin which took place shortly after. According to Fraser, Colquhoun of Luss visited the King at Stirling on 21 December 1602, accompanied by a number of female relatives of the people who had been killed or wounded at Glenfinlas and who were carrying the bloodied shirts of their dead or wounded relatives. The King was sympathetic and vowed to take vengeance on the MacGregors. He granted a commission of lieutenancy to Colquhoun of Luss giving him the power to repress the crimes made against him and to apprehend the perpetrators. This however roused the MacGregors to raise a strong force against the Colquhouns.

Fraser also disputes Gordon's contemporary account that in early 1603 the MacGregors and Colquhouns made friendly proposals to hold conference to find a peaceful settlement, again favouring the MacGregors, but Fraser says that there is no evidence to show that this conference ever took place, let alone that at the end of it the Colquhouns treacherously attacked the MacGregors as stated by Gordon. Fraser states that at this time the town council of Dumbarton issued an order for the burgesses to be provided with weapons and armour in readiness, presumably, for the Clan Gregor.

== Conflict at Glen Fruin ==
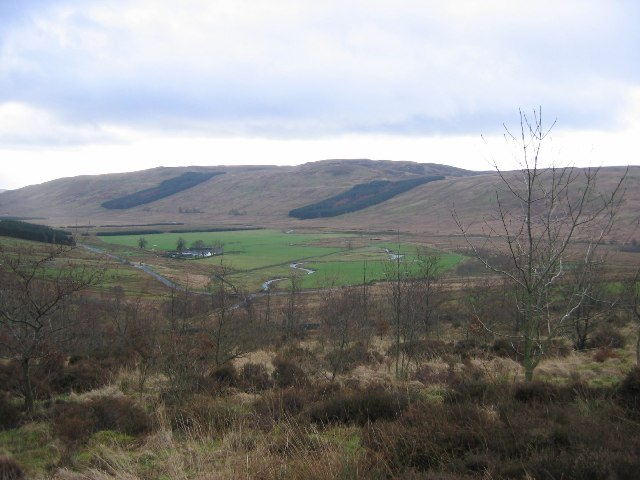
Glen Fruin

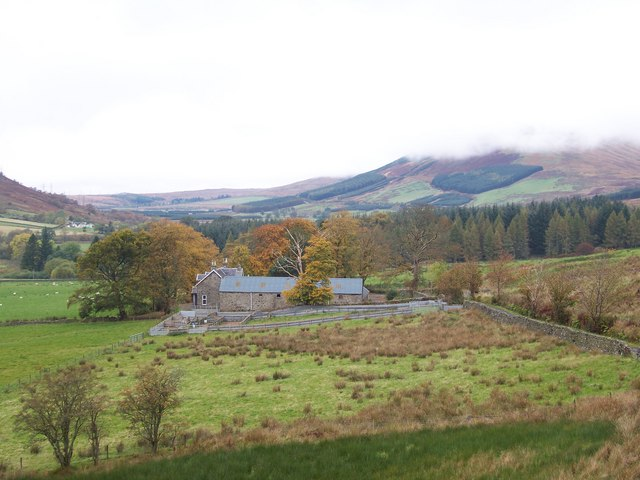
Glen Fruin

Allaster MacGregor of Glenstrae, at the head of a large body of his clan, which also included men from the Clan Cameron, all armed with hagbuts, pistols, murrions, mailcoats, axes, two-handed swords, darlochs, and other weapons, advanced into the territory of Colquhoun of Luss. At the time there was no road on the Loch Long side, the present road apparently built at a later date by the Duke of Argyll and called The Duke's Road. However, there was a track or path of some kind along the side of Loch Long which may have been the way that the MacGregors came into Glen Fruin. To repel the invaders Colquhoun gathered together a considerable force of armed men, who under the royal commission, he had raised to protect the district and punish the MacGregors.

The two sides met on 7 February 1603 at Glen Fruin. The MacGregors have been estimated as numbering between 300 and 400 foot soldiers. The Colquhouns have been estimated as numbering about 300 horse and 500 foot. The ground on which the battle took place was extremely unfavourable to the Colquhouns, especially for their horse. The MacGregors had assembled in two divisions, one was at the head of the glen and the other was placed in an ambush position near to the farm of Strone. The Colquhouns entered Glen Fruin from the Luss side through the glen of Auchengaich which is opposite Strone. Colquhoun pushed on his force to get through the glen before encountering with the MacGregors, but they were already aware of his approach and Allaster MacGregor pushed forward one of his divisions and entered the head of the glen in time to prevent the Colquhouns from emerging out of the upper end of the glen. Meanwhile, his brother, John MacGregor, with the ambush division took a detour to the rear of the Colquhouns which prevented their retreat back through the glen without fighting their way through. The Colquhouns also least expected to be attacked from the rear.

Allaster MacGregor, at the head of his division furiously charged Colquhoun of Luss and his men. The Colquhouns bravely maintained the contest for a while. Fraser disputes other accounts of the battle which say that the MacGregors only lost two men killed. However, due to the unfavorable circumstances in which they had to fight, the Colquhouns were unable to maintain their ground and fell into the moss at the farm of Auchengaich where they were thrown into disorder. Here, on the moss, Colquhoun's cavalry was useless. The MacGregors killed many of them and forced them into a retreat in which they had to fight through John MacGregor's division which proved even more disastrous. However, according to the Clan Gregor account, John MacGregor who was the chief's brother was killed in the battle.

Alexander Colquhoun, the chief, was chased all the way to Rossdhu Castle which afforded him some refuge. According to Fraser, 140 Colquhouns were killed in the battle and many more were wounded. Other sources state that over 200 Colquhouns were killed.

== Aftermath ==
Government reprisals included the proscription of the Clan Gregor, who were outlawed for the massacre. King James sought to make the Highlands and Islands "answerable to God, justice and himself" and to assimilate them into his new Britain. One of the most radical manifestations of this new programme was the extermination of the MacGregors. Their chief, Allaster MacGregor, was executed in 1604, along with eleven of his chieftains, and in 1633 it became legal to kill MacGregors and hunt them with bloodhounds. The Clan Gregor was scattered with many taking other surnames such as Murray or Grant. Charles II restored the MacGregor name in 1661, but in 1693 it was once again disallowed by William of Orange. In 1784 the MacGregors were allowed to resume their own name and were finally restored to all of the rights and privileges of British citizens.

In 1609, John Murray, 1st Earl of Tullibardine, had apprehended one Alan Oig Mcan Tuagh in Glen Coe who was one of the principal executors of the slaughter committed by the Clan Gregor at the Battle of Glen Fruin and who with his own hand had slew forty people who were "without armour".

At the end of the eighteenth century the chiefs of Clan Gregor and Clan Colquhoun visited and shook hands on the site of the slaughter at Glen Fruin.

== Alleged slaughter of students ==
There is a tradition that after the battle the victorious MacGregors slaughtered a group of clerical students who had come to watch it, but this story is not supported by historical records. The tradition is that the MacGregors murdered about eighty youths in this incident. It is alluded to in the supposed factual introduction to Walter Scott's novel Rob Roy in which it says that the culprits were from the Clan MacFarlane, allies of the MacGregors. According to John Parker Lawson, there is a story that a group of theological students who had come to witness the battle but who were probably on an excursion at the time had been put into a barn for safety by the chief of Colquhouns. They then fell into the hands of the victorious chief of MacGregors who put them under the care of one of his cadets, Dugald Ciar Mhor, the direct ancestor of the celebrated Rob Roy MacGregor. Dugald apparently savagely put them to death and when he was asked by his chief where the youths were he replied "Ask that, and God save me". However, Lawson says that there is no proof that this incident took place and that it forms no part of the indictment which was made against the MacGregors who took part in the battle and for which almost every criminal act which could possibly brought against them was brought forward. Lawson concludes that it is impossible for such an act to have escaped the notice of the Crown prosecutors.

== Music and poetry associated with the battle ==
The poet David Wardlaw Scott alluded to the chief of MacGregors, chief of Colquhouns and the Battle of Glen Fruin in his poem Dora Marcelli, The Last of Her Race. The writer Peter McArthur composed a ballad entitled The Raid of Glen Fruin in memory of the battle. The song The Bloody Sarks likewise recounts the battle.

== Archaeology ==
In July 1967, an excavation took place on a mound in Glen Fruin that was thought to be the burial place of the Colquhouns who were killed in the battle. However, it was discovered that the mound was not the burial site of the Colquhouns but a Bronze Age encampment. There is also a grey stone in the glen where it is believed that John MacGregor, the chief's brother, who was one of the few slain on the other side was buried.
