= Beinn a' Mhanaich =

Coordinates: 56.113°N 4.787°W

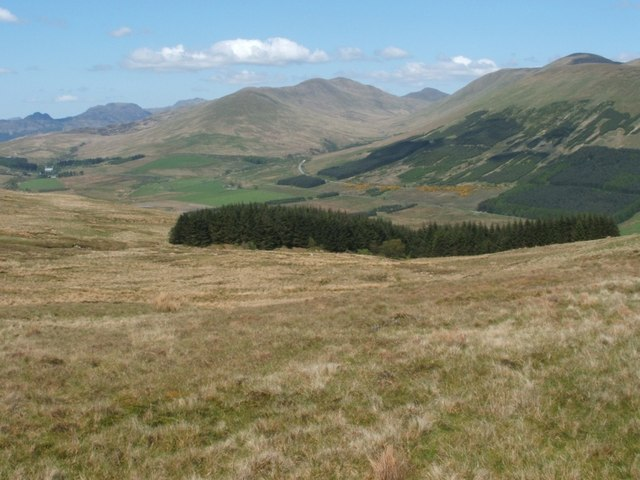
- Beinn a' Mhanaich (centre) showing off its long southern ridge

Highest point
- Elevation: 709 m (2,326 ft)
- Prominence: 358 m (1,175 ft)
- Listing: Graham, Marilyn

Geography
- Location: Argyll and Bute, Scotland
- Parent range: Luss Hills, Grampian Mountains
- OS grid: NS269946
- Topo map: OS Landranger 56

Beinn a' Mhanaich (709 m) is a hill in the southern Grampian Mountains of Scotland. It is located in Argyll and Bute, in the southern Luss Hills north of the town of Helensburgh.

The most westerly of the Luss Hills, its finest feature is its long southern ridge. An army firing range is located on the western side of the hill going down to Loch Long, and one is advised to pay attention to signs while traversing the ridge.
