= Gare Loch =

Sea loch in Argyll and Bute, Scotland

- An Gearr Loch (Scottish Gaelic)
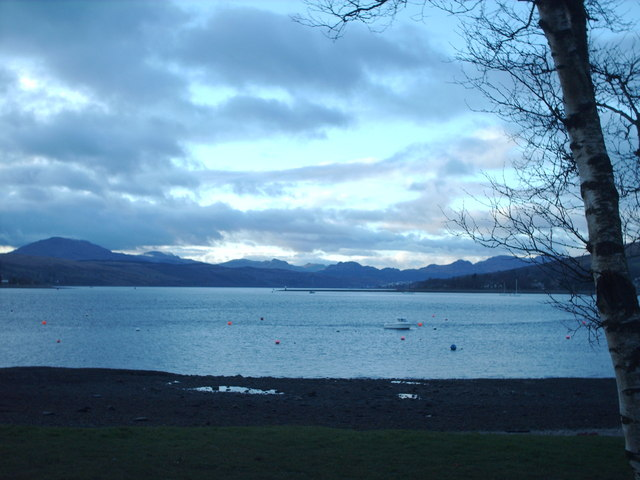
- Gare Loch

- Location within Scotland
- Coordinates: 56°02′15″N 4°48′55″W
- Type: Sea Loch
- Frozen: No

The Gare Loch or Gareloch (Scottish Gaelic: An Gearr Loch) is an open sea loch in Argyll and Bute in the west of Scotland, and it bears a similar name to the village of Gairloch in the north west Highlands.

The loch is well used for recreational boating, water sports and fishing. Harbour and grey seals are often seen in the Gare Loch along with pods of porpoise. Bottle Nose whales were photographed in September 2020. The loch also has been used since the early 20th century for naval training and as a base for the United Kingdom's submarine based nuclear weapons system.

== Geography ==
A sea loch aligned north–south, Gare Loch is 10 kilometres (6.2 mi) long with an average width of 1.5 kilometres (0.93 mi). At its southern end it opens into the Firth of Clyde through the Rhu narrows. The village of Rosneath lies on the western shore just north of Rosneath Point and gives the name Rosneath Peninsula to the whole body of land separating the Gare Loch from Loch Long to the west.

The town of Helensburgh lies on the eastern shore and is the largest settlement on the banks of the loch. Other towns and villages next to the loch include Rhu, Garelochhead, Shandon, Clynder and Rosneath.

== Recreational and shipping use ==
At the north end of the loch the substantial village of Garelochhead includes adventure holiday facilities and has a station on the West Highland Line. The Gare Loch offers good conditions for sightseeing, sailing and sea angling.

The Greek sugar boat Captayannis was heading for the sheltered waters of the Loch but now lies wrecked in the Clyde.

== Naval history ==
The loch was used by the Royal Navy dating back to the First World War. On 29 January 1917 the steam-powered submarine HMS K13 sank in the loch during sea-trials. The submarine was carrying 80 passengers, made up of naval personnel as well as shipbuilders, when seawater entered the engine room causing flooding which killed 31. The remaining 48 men aboard were rescued in an effort which took over 57 hours. The submarine was later salvaged and re-entered service as HMS K22. As a result of sinking of K13, no other Royal Navy vessel has been named using the number 13.

However it was during the Second World War that the loch became the site of a major military port, as its depth made it suitable to accommodate a large variety of ships, and No.1 Military Port was built at Faslane. This was used during the war for naval landing preparations that were deployed in North Africa and the Normandy landings, in conjunction with the United States Rosneath naval base at the mouth of the loch, and operations at the nearby Holy Loch, In the 1950s, the loch was used to store decommissioned naval vessels, with many being scrapped at Faslane.

The Clyde Submarine Base at Faslane was upgraded in 1964 as part of the United Kingdom's preparations for hosting the Polaris submarine based nuclear programme. The site was chosen due to its deep water, suitable for submarine operations and ease of access to the North Atlantic. The site continues to operate a number of naval operations, mostly associated with the current nuclear Trident defence system and also to be the base of the Royal Navy's Astute-class submarines.

Given the siting of the nuclear missile programme on the Loch, pressure groups such as the Campaign for Nuclear Disarmament and Trident Ploughshares have maintained a permanent peace camp outside the gates of the naval facility since 1982.

The Royal Marines' Garelochhead training camp was established in the 1940s. New facilities were installed in 2014.
