= Doune Hill =

Mountain in Scotland

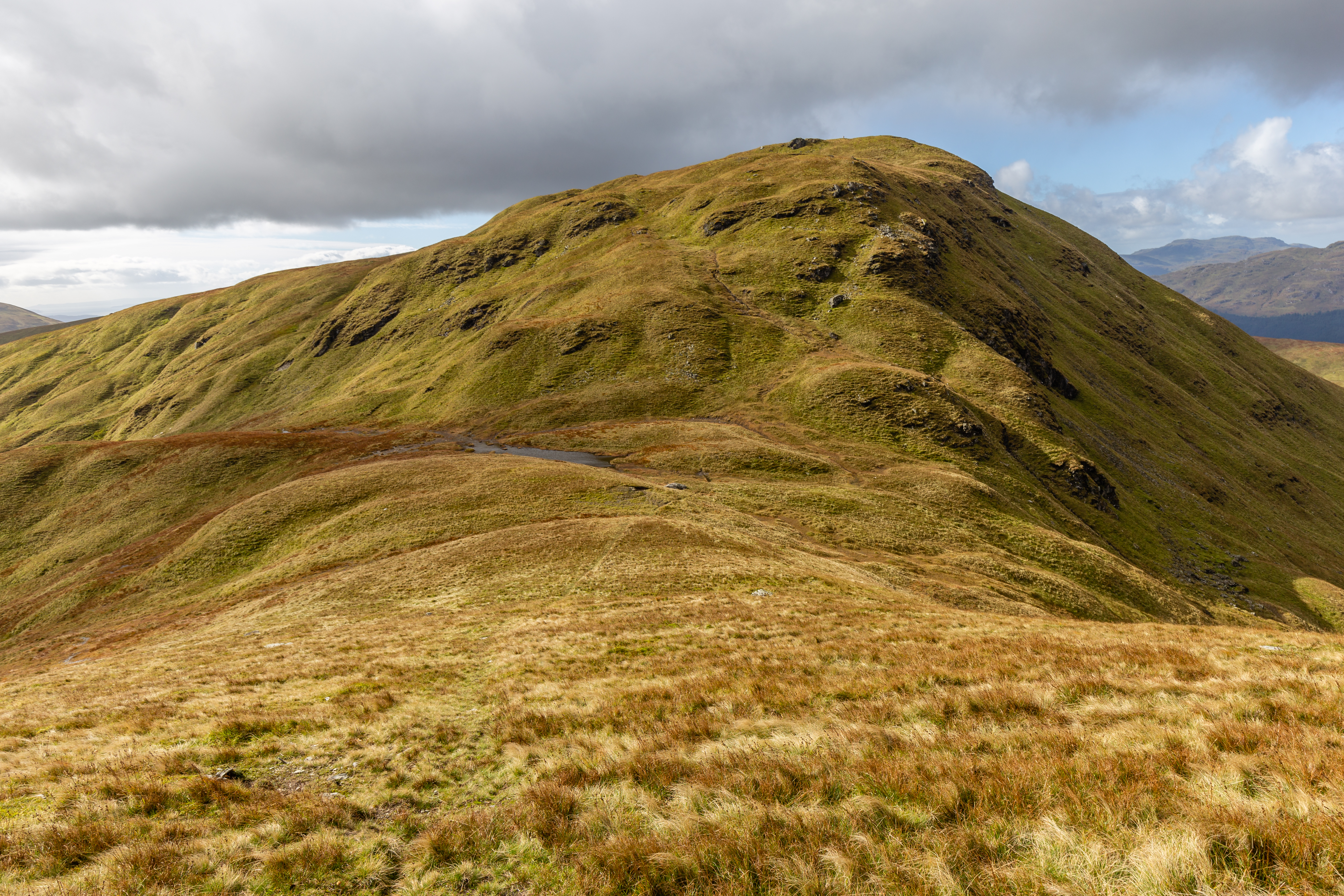
- Doune Hill

Highest point
- Elevation: 734 m (2,408 ft)
- Prominence: 695 m (2,280 ft)
- Listing: Graham, Marilyn
- Coordinates: 56°08′10″N 4°45′09″W

Geography
- Location: Argyll and Bute, Scotland
- Parent range: Luss Hills, Grampian Mountains
- OS grid: NS290970
- Topo map: OS Landranger 56

Doune Hill (734 m) is a peak in the foothills of the Grampian Mountains of Scotland. It is located near the village of Luss in Argyll and Bute, west of Loch Lomond.

The hill is the highest point of the Luss Hills, a southern outlier of the Grampian Mountains and stands on the edge of Loch Lomond and the Trossachs National Park. Its long grassy ridge makes it a popular peak with hillwalkers.
