= National Industrial Chemicals Notification and Assessment Scheme =

Logo

The National Industrial Chemicals Notification and Assessment Scheme (NICNAS) was the Australian government's regulatory body for industrial chemicals until 2020. NICNAS was designed to help protect workers, the public and the environment from the harmful effects of industrial chemicals. It made risk assessment and safety information on chemicals widely available and providing recommendations for their safe use. NICNAS also informed importers and manufacturers of their legal responsibilities.

In 2020, it was replaced by the Australian Industrial Chemicals Introduction Scheme (AICIS).

== History ==
Despite an extensive history of chemical manufacture, use, import and export, it was not until the advancement in manufacturing technologies and processes in the mid 20th century that the value of chemical assessment and regulation was fully realised. Industrial chemical assessment and regulation is still a relatively new phenomenon for many governments including Australia because, prior to the establishment of industrial chemical legislation, these substances were not subject to the governmental review that other types of chemicals were (such as pesticides and pharmaceuticals).

In 1989, the Australian government enacted the Industrial Chemicals (Notification and Assessment) Act 1989 (ICNA Act), which led to the establishment of NICNAS in 1990. Since then, the Australian government has continued to improve the assessment, regulation and management of industrial chemicals for the protection of human health and safety. The Rio Earth Summit in 1992 led to the remodelling of chemical assessment regimes under cooperative agreements with New Zealand, Canada and the United States.

== Organisation ==
=== Structure of organisation ===
The structure of NICNAS is a direct reflection of its function. The Director of NICNAS is responsible to the Assistant Minister for Health. The Director is a member of numerous committees and consults and holds discussions with relevant industries, key groups and community representatives to ensure that all are informed and that practices comply with standards and regulations set out by NICNAS.

The organisation's activities flow into key areas including: business management and communication strategy; compliance and enforcement and regulatory strategy; and scientific strategy. Each branch has specific responsibilities that focus on its own area but retain a certain level of transparency to ensure that all groups work cohesively. Business and communication focuses on office management, finance, corporate governance, communications and media. The compliance and enforcement and regulatory arm concentrates on compliance reporting and reform, as well as international obligations. The scientific branch is responsible for notification and assessment of new chemicals, assessment of existing chemicals (those already listed on the Australian Inventory of Chemical Substance, or AICS) as Priority Existing Chemicals (PECs), Secondary Notifications or as accelerated assessments under the Inventory Multi-tiered Assessment and Prioritisation (IMAP) framework, or as chemicals assessed under the targeted assessment program.

=== Scope and funding ===
All NICNAS activities are funded by the fees charged for the registration of new and existing industrial chemical introducers as well as the fees and administration charges for the assessment of new chemicals. The administration fees and charges are outlined in the cost recovery policy.

=== Legal authority ===
NICNAS administers the ICNA Act, as well as the Industrial Chemicals (Notification and Assessment) Regulations 1990 and the Cosmetics Standard 2007. The ICNA Act provides a number of enforcement powers to NICNAS.

=== Objectives ===
The objectives of the NICNAS are to provide a national assessment and notification scheme for the following purposes:

- Assisting in the protection of the Australian people and the environment from the harmful effect of industrial chemicals,
- Offering information and making recommendations about chemicals to workers, industry, the community and other regulatory agencies,
- Providing effect to Australia's obligations under international agreements relating to the regulation of chemicals
- Assembling statistics in relation to chemicals.

== Functions and powers ==
=== Chemical regulation ===
The chemical properties and potential health and environmental effects of any new chemical must be notified to and assessed by NICNAS before it is introduced to Australia. Chemicals currently used in Australia are also reviewed (priority industrial chemicals) and any person may nominate an industrial chemical for assessment. NICNAS then makes this information widely available to the public and industry through its website and publications.

==== Australian Inventory of Chemical Substances ====
The current Australian Inventory of Chemical Substances (AICS) was formed under the ICNA Act. Its first manifestation was as the Australian Core Inventory of Chemical Substances in 1984. The AICS is a list of all industrial chemicals used in Australia between 1 January 1977 and 28 February 1990, as well as any additions or corrections to the list since. The AICS is maintained by NICNAS and contains over 38,000 chemicals (as of 2009). Any industrial chemical listed on the AICS is regarded as an 'existing' industrial chemical. Any industrial chemical not listed on the AICS is regarded as a 'new' industrial chemical.

==== Risk assessment and management ====
NICNAS conducts two types of risk assessment: quantitative (to measure the risk posed by an existing chemical) and qualitative (to describe the risk posed by a new chemical). NICNAS assessment reports include toxicity, environment, OHS and public health assessments. NICNAS undertakes a four-step risk assessment procedure:

- Hazard identification: determination and description of any adverse effects a substance may cause at any dose
- Hazard characterisation: evaluation of dose–response relationship for each of the adverse effects
- Exposure assessment: evaluation of exposure routes to a chemical in the environment
- Risk characterisation: interpretation and combination of the previous steps to provide a practical estimate of the risk and any limitations and uncertainties.

NICNAS then produces risk management guidelines, which are regularly reviewed. These aim to balance:

- the risk posed by a substance;
- the economic, political and social costs of implementing strategies to minimise or eliminate the identified risk;
- and the social and economic benefits of risk minimisation.

=== Registration ===
Any individual or business who wishes to import or manufacture industrial chemicals for commercial purposes must register with NICNAS, regardless of the amount or toxicity of the industrial chemical. Registration lasts for the maximum of one year from 1 September to 31 August in the following year and must be renewed each year. The registration is for the individual or business so that they may lawfully import or manufacture the relevant industrial chemical, not registration of the chemical itself. The Register of Industrial Chemical Introducers lists all of the organisations registered with NICNAS. Registration allows NICNAS to keep people and business fully informed of their legal obligations and safety information. An annual registration fee is charged, which is based on the value of chemicals imported and/or manufactured:

NICNAS Fees and Charges Registration Tier	Value of Industrial Chemicals Introduced	2010-11 Registration Cost
1	≤$499,999	$395
2	$500,000 – $4,999,999	$1,577
3	≥$5,000,000	$9,201

==== Industrial chemicals ====
The definition of an industrial chemical is a 'catch-all' phrase designed to cover all chemicals other than identified exceptions. Industrial chemicals include paints, dyes, pigments, solvents, adhesives, plastics, inks and laboratory chemicals. It also includes chemicals used in mineral and petroleum processing, refrigeration, printing, photocopying, household cleaning products, cosmetics and toiletries. Products designed to dispense industrial chemicals (e.g. ballpoint pens dispense ink), articles (e.g. plastic chairs, glow sticks and photographic film) and radioactive chemicals are not included. Other chemicals outside the scope of NICNAS which are regulated by other organisations include:

- Medicines and medicinal products (Therapeutic Goods Administration)
- Pesticides and veterinary chemicals (Australian Pesticides and Veterinary Medicines Authority)
- Food or food additives. (Food Standards Australia New Zealand)

A chemical may have multiple uses. So long as one of those uses is industrial, the person or organisation importing or manufacturing the chemical must be registered with NICNAS. For example, ethylene oxide is used industrially to produce other chemicals and as a fumigant in agricultural products.

==== Commercial purpose ====
NICNAS registration is required only when the industrial chemical is to be used for commercial purposes. A commercial purpose includes any use or sale by a business. Non-commercial purposes include personal use, non-profit research, charity, and teaching.

=== Compliance ===
NICNAS ensures that importers, manufacturers and exporters of industrial chemicals are aware of and exercise their obligations under the ICNA Act. These include: the registration of industrial chemical importers and manufacturers; chemical-specific obligations associated with new and existing chemicals. NICNAS also informs exporters of their obligations under international treaties. NICNAS encourages voluntary compliance by industry but also has extensive enforcement powers to ensure compliance.

=== Enforcement powers ===
==== Informal enforcement powers ====
NICNAS' focus on cooperating with industry allows for informal enforcement actions. NICNAS' enforcement policy states that such actions may be taken where:

- non-compliance was inadvertent and not deliberate;
- it was the first instance of non-compliance;
- the person or business cooperates with NICNAS to with the Act; and/or
- informal action provides adequate deterrence.

==== Formal enforcement powers ====
The ICNA Act provides a number of formal enforcement powers to NICNAS:

- the Director may request and gather information as well as revoke permits and certificates;
- Inspectors may search premises to monitor compliance or in relation to a suspected breach of the ICNA Act either by consent or with a warrant;
- Inspectors may seize samples of substances, photograph the premises and inspect and copy records;
- Inspectors may require persons to answer questions and produce any documents or records; and
- NICNAS may apply for an injunction to stop an unregistered importer or manufacturer from introducing any industrial chemicals.

A person found in breach of the Act will be liable for fines of up to $33,000 for an individual and $165,000 for a company.

== Reforms and consultations ==
NICNAS has conducted a number of reforms and consultations across a wide range of industrial chemicals. NICNAS aims to maintain an open and transparent system to uphold existing health and safety and environmental standards.

=== Existing chemicals program ===
NICNAS has implemented reforms to its Existing Chemical Program (ECP). NICNAS works with similar regulatory agencies in other countries by exchanging information, in an effort to speed up processes, cut duplication and to reduce the costs of assessing chemicals. A review of the ECP was undertaken from 2003 to 2006, following concerns the program was not assessing chemicals in the most efficient manner. Implementations of recommendations from the review commenced in 2007 and are ongoing.

=== Disinfectants ===
In June 2006 the Australian Government agreed to a review of the regulation of disinfectant products, recommended by the Australian Government Regulation Taskforce. Review of the regulation of disinfectants has been continually conducted since 1998, the latest of which involved consultation between the Therapeutic Goods Administration (TGA) and NICNAS in 2008 and 2009. In 2009, it was proposed that the TGA maintain regulation of registrable and listable disinfectants and transfer to NICNAS the regulation of household and commercial grade disinfectants and sanitary chemicals. The transfer has not been finalised.

=== Cosmetics ===
Reforms to the cosmetic-therapeutic boundary took effect on 17 September 2007 with the introduction of the Cosmetic Standard 2007 under the ICNA Act. Subsequently, chemicals in some products that were previously regulated by TGA are now considered industrial (cosmetic) chemicals and are regulated by NICNAS. A consequence of these reforms is that these products may contain ingredients that are not listed on the AICS and are therefore new industrial chemicals. The cosmetics reform package agreed that chemicals that were regulated as therapeutics would be recognised as industrial chemicals, subject to eligibility requirements. Cosmetics are the subject of continual reform.

=== Nanotechnology ===
In November 2009, NICNAS published its proposed regulatory reforms of industrial nanomaterials and undertook a consultation period with the public. As at the start of 2011, the reforms are still under review.

=== Low regulatory concern chemicals ===
The Low Regulatory Concern Chemicals (LRCC) Reforms were introduced by NICNAS in 2004 to: encourage the introduction of new and safer chemicals; present options for access to industrial chemicals already assessed; and to provide greater access to chemical safety information. A number of these proposals were implemented in 2004–05, and are the subject of ongoing evaluation to determine their effectiveness and their impact on stakeholders. In 2009, comments were made by industry on the slow pace of the completion of the reforms. While reform is considered vital to industry, NICNAS indicated that it is a timely procedure and their main concern is ensuring the best implementation for the reform, rather than the speed.

=== Legislative changes ===
In 2010, NICNAS proposed to justify the ICNA Act. The planned changes and reforms covered:

- The transfer to the Australian Inventory of Chemical Substances (AICS) of certain chemicals, including those in cosmetic products controlled by the TGA. This was to address a regulatory gap in the safety of public health and complete reforms related to cosmetics and would also ease future reforms;
- Introduce requirements for the assessment of new active ingredients in secondary sunscreens;
- Provide for the screening assessment of all new industrial chemicals for their potential to be determined, bioaccumulative and lethal, in agreement with Australia's obligations;
- Make other amendments in accordance with international best practice, including a more specific requirement on public exposure to the chemical and revision of some physical and chemical properties.

In July 2010 NICNAS published a notice on its website seeking comments on the proposal. The refined proposal will be published once approval has been completed.

== Publications ==
NICNAS supplies chemical safety information free of charge to a variety of stakeholders, through a variety of mechanisms. The three major publications are the NICNAS Handbook for Notifiers, the Chemical Gazette, and the NICNAS Annual Report. The Handbook is designed to assist all manufacturers and importers in Australia in complying with their legal obligations. The Chemical Gazette is a monthly publication update that informs readers of the latest changes to the NICNAS legislation, highlights newly assessed chemicals and updates the Register of Industrial Chemical Introducers. The Annual Report provides an overview of the achievements and performance of NICNAS. Other publications include chemical assessment reports, information sheets, safety sheets, chemical alerts, guidance notes, newsletters, e-letters, surveys and brochures. NICNAS maintains a website which makes all of these publications readily available.

== International ==
=== International forums ===
NICNAS participated in the development of Agenda 21 of the United Nations Conference on Environment of 1992. Agenda 21 established the Intergovernmental Forum for Chemical Safety (IFCS), which promotes access and availability of industrial chemical information and risk assessment regimes between the nations. NICNAS also participated in and contributed to the many initiatives outlined within Chapter 19, including:

- incorporation of the OECD High Production Volume Program;
- assessments for the Concise International Chemical Assessment Documents;
- negotiations for an agreement for Global Harmonisation Strategies; and
- utilisation of OECD SIDS Initial Assessment Reports when conducting PEC Assessment

An important forum for Australia is the APEC Chemical Dialogue (CD) and Regulatory Forum, as it focuses on industry chemical trade challenges and the adoption of workable chemical regulation practices in the Asia-Pacific region.

=== Bilateral works ===
There are numerous bilateral cooperative arrangements between NICNAS and similar organisations of other nations that were ratified for the ultimate purpose of cooperative and global harmonization of chemical assessment and regulation. They include:

- Memorandum of Understanding with Environmental Risk Management Authority (ERMA), New Zealand; ratified 7 November 2002;
- Department of Health of Canada and Department of Environment of Canada; ratified in 2002 and renewed in 2007; and
- Cooperative Arrangement with the Office of Pollution Prevention and Toxics of the Environmental Protection Agency of the U.S.; ratified on 31 December 2008.

The predominant objectives of these arrangements collectively are:

- exchange of information on chemical management regimes
- access to reviews, assessments and data regarding relevant industrial chemicals
- implementation of consistent regulatory practices where feasible
- maintaining contact between organisations

=== Treaties ===
The ICNA Act implements Australia's international obligations under:

- the Rotterdam Convention on the Prior Informed Consent Procedure for certain Hazardous Chemicals and Pesticides in International Trade (PIC Convention); and
- the Stockholm Convention on Persistent Organic Pollutants (POP) ratified by Australia on 20 May 2004 and enforced from 18 August 2004.

The PIC Convention focuses on international trade of industrial chemicals and pesticides that have restrictions or bans imposed upon them by one or more individual nations. The Convention aims to promote exchange of information relating to these chemicals between countries and a cooperative approach to their importation and exportation.

The Stockholm Convention applies to chemicals characterised by: resistance to degradation in the environment; wide geographical distribution; accumulation in fatty tissues; and toxicity to living organisms. It aims to establish; control measures that reduce or eradicate POPs releases, including by-product POPs; ‘good’ management practices of stockpiles and wastes containing POPs.

Other treaties incorporate the Basel Convention and the Montreal Protocol. The former concentrates on control of transboundary hazardous waste movement whilst the latter on regulation of substances, which contribute to the depletion of the ozone layer.
