= Lomond Roads Cycling Club =

Lomond Roads Cycling Club is a cycling club based in Clydebank, Scotland. The club was founded in 1933. Their current clubroom is in the Double L Centre, Jowitt Avenue, Clydebank.

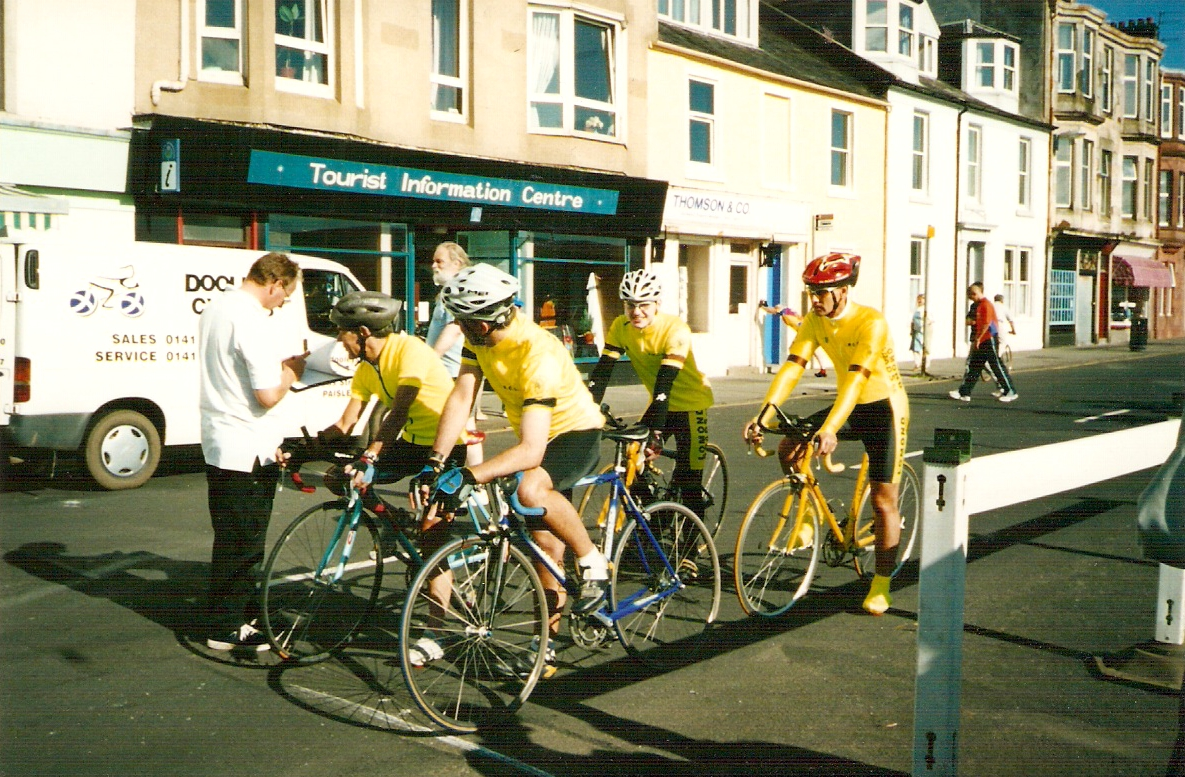
Lomond Roads team with the last yellow/brown club kit

== Team colours ==
From its foundation, the club colours were a yellow and brown combination. They were changed however, in 2003, to yellow and blue. These colours remain to the present day. Before the change of team colours, the last yellow/brown combination consisted of a mainly yellow jersey, with a 1 inch brown band on each sleeve. The shorts were black, with large straight yellow panels on the sides. Later versions of this kit often had the club name printed in large bold lettering on the back of the jerseys and sides of the shorts. The stylised club logo, consisting of a winged wheel was also dropped from the new yellow/blue design, replaced by 4 joined squares, containing the club initials - LRCC.

== Activities ==
=== Social rides ===
The club's main activity is road cycling, but they also organise and participate in some mountain biking events. They invite anyone to their organised weekly social road rides, starting from Kilbowie Roundabout at the junction of Kilbowie Road, and the A82. The club location in Clydebank allows a large variety of runs varying in distance and terrain. From the short runs such as Balloch to the north, and Gourock to the south west, they can range up to the long and demanding runs such as Crianlarich, Ardrossan or Tighnabruaich.

Until 2008, some members had complained that the club social ride had been too long and/or intense. This was largely due to the fact most of the club members were enthusiastic racers, and used the club runs as their main training facility. This was discouraging new members from joining the club. However, until then, they did not have a sufficient number of beginner riders to justify organising separate runs.

But with a recent increase in popularity of cycling, and increase in new riders, it became possible to introduce a novice run from 2009. This run is normally a lot shorter than the main group's run, with a general rule of this run is that it will be taken at the pace of the least fit rider, so that no-one will be dropped. As the previous novice riders have become fitter, and more novices have joined, they have now introduced an Intermediate run from 2010, for those who feel fitter than novices.

=== Racing ===
The club currently organises the following events for its own members.

- 10 Mile TT - This is a time trail event that is taken place over a distance of 10 miles. The 2 courses used for this are;

West Ferry: From the West Ferry railway bridge, along the A8 to Port Glasgow, then back again. Luss: From the lay-by on the A82 above Luss, to the Arden roundabout, then back again.

- 25 Mile TT - This is a time trail event that is taken place over a distance of 25 miles. The course used for this is by Loch Lomond, from shortly before Tarbet, to the Arden Roundabout, then back to finish at the start.
- Medium Gear - This is a time trial event where the competitors gear size is restricted. The course used for this is the same as the 25 Mile TT
- Hilly TT - This is a time trial event which takes competitors from the lay-by just after Arden Roundabout at Loch Lomond, over the old M.O.D Road towards Garelochhead, to turn at the roundabout and retrace their route to finish at the top of the hill.

As well as internal club events, members have represented the club at a national level, competing in events ranging from local 10 mile time trials to the Bealach Mor cyclosportive and the Fred Whitton Challenge.

They don't currently organise open events, but have previously organised the Westwind 10 mile time trial, using the West Ferry course described above. They also organised a road race around the Coulport peninsula, which started and finished just outside Garelochhead, on top of the Whistlefield hill. From 2005, it was named the "Hugh Dornan Memorial Road Race" in honour of the popular club member. This was part of Scottish Cycling's Grand Prix Series, then Division 1 Road Race Series, before Scottish Cycling launched the Super-6 series. The last time it was run was on 18 March 2007.

=== National results ===
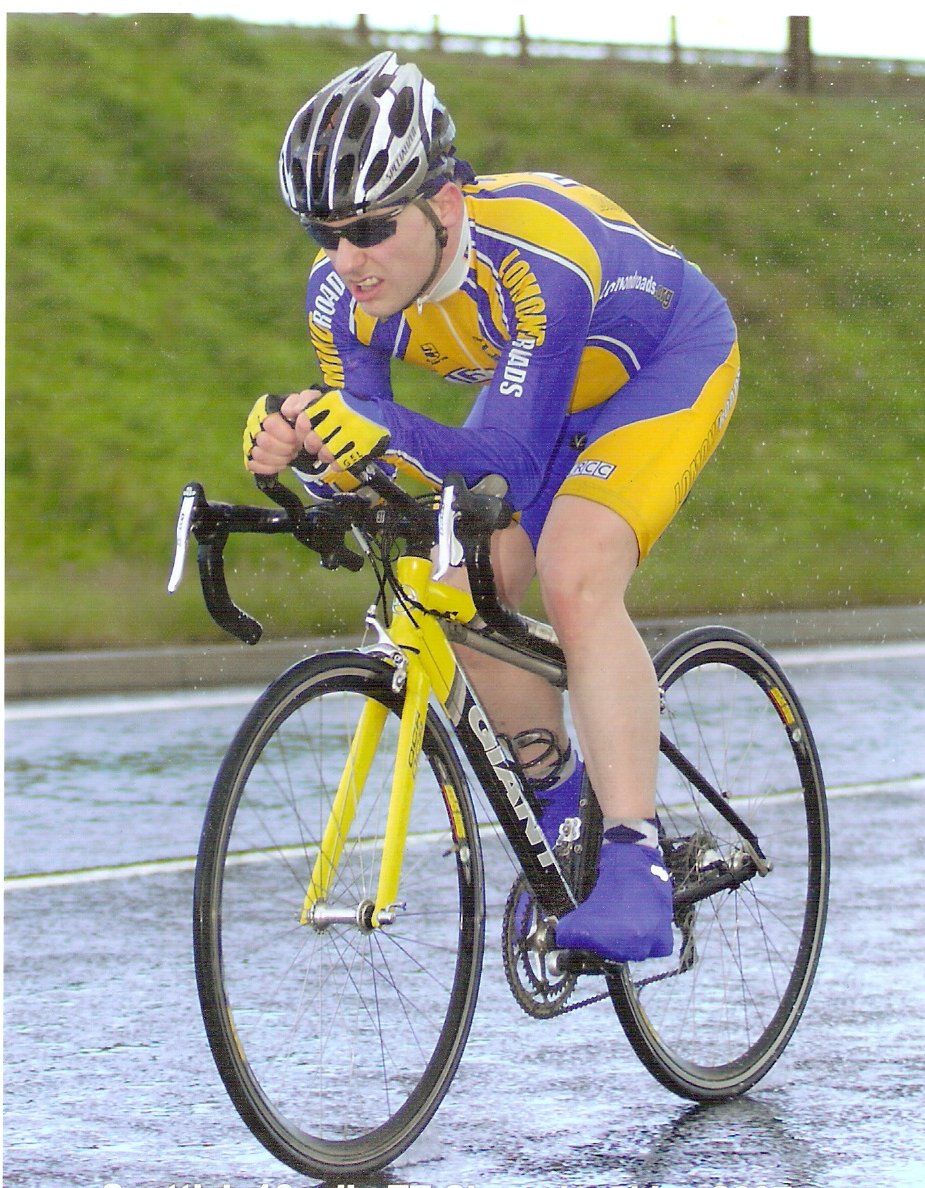
A Lomond Roads time triallist riding in the new yellow/blue team kit.

Bealach Mor 2009

Overall Position	Rider	Time
18	Tom MacDonald	04:56:02
37	Paul Gareze	05:10:48
73	Fraser MacBeath	05:28:44
77	Gordon Dick	05:30:11
83	Allan Ross	05:31:02
121	Richard Burchmore	05:49:13
142	Stuart Whitelaw	05:55:07
204	Thomas Skeith	06:18:26
216	James Byrne	06:23:09
228	Raymond McGregor	06:29:21
DNF	David Smith	

Fred Whitton Challenge 2009

Overall Position	Rider	Time
103	Tom McDonald	06:56
294	Paul Gareze	07:40
353	David Monro	07:51
428	Gordon Dick	08:06
522	Iain McKay	08:23
547	Richard Burchmore	08:27

Icebreaker Team Time Trial 2010

Overall Position	Rider	Time
13	Gordon Dick & Paul Gareze	0:28:47
17	Jack Walker & David Munro	0:30:22

Bealach Mor 2010

Overall Position	Rider	Time
27	Fraser MacBeath	04:47:40
28	Paul Gareze	04:47:52
40	David Monro	04:58:50
47	Tom MacDonald	05:04:03
67	Richard Burchmore	05:16:01
76	Gordon Dick	05:20:24
80	Iain McKay	05:22:25
81	Stuart Whitelaw	05:24:41
104	Allan Ross	05:30:48
119	Ian Stuart	05:34:31
235	Steven Jolly	06:19:05
271	Raymond McGregor	06:34:30
290	Simon Minshull	06:46:14
291	Ronnie McFarlane	06:46:46

== Notable members ==
The trade unionist Stewart Crawford was an enthusiastic cyclist, and a member of Lomond Roads for a period, before retiring from the sport following a couple of bad accidents.

== See also ==
- Clydebank Sports Category
- Garelochhead
