= Beinn Bhreac (Arrochar) =

Mountain in Argyll and Bute, Scotland

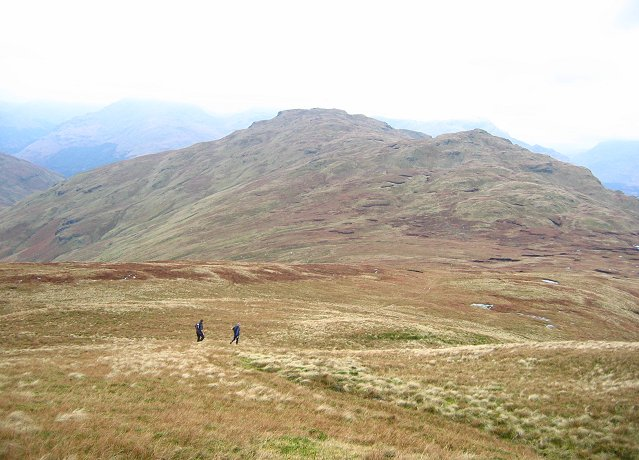
- Beinn Bhreac

Highest point
- Elevation: 681 m (2,234 ft)
- Prominence: 524 m (1,719 ft)
- Listing: Graham, Marilyn
- Coordinates: 56°09′48″N 4°42′17″W

Geography
- Location: Argyll and Bute, Scotland
- Parent range: Luss Hills, Grampian Mountains
- OS grid: NN321000
- Topo map: OS Landranger 56

Beinn Bhreac (681 m) is a mountain in Argyll and Bute, Scotland. It is part of the Luss Hills, a southern subrange of the Grampian Mountains.

Rising from the western shore of Loch Lomond near the village of Tarbet, it takes the form of a rough ridge.
