= Garelochhead =

Town in Argyll and Bute, Scotland

Coordinates: 56°04′52″N 4°49′49″W

Garelochhead: Scottish Gaelic: Ceann a' Gheàrrloch
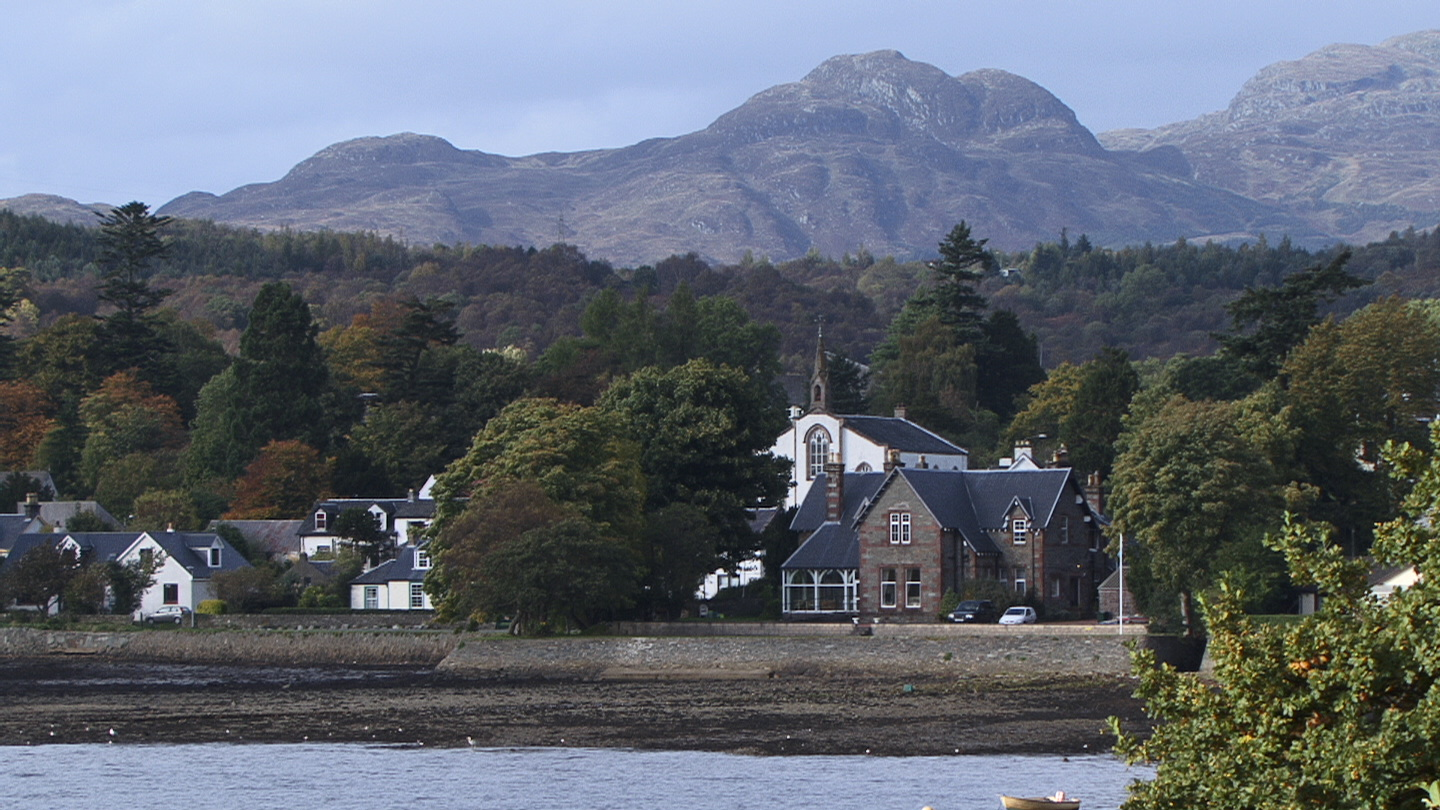

- Location within Argyll and Bute
- Population: 3,650 (2020)
- OS grid reference: NS240912
  - Edinburgh: 64 mi (103 km)
  - London: 370 mi (595 km)
- Council area: Argyll and Bute
- Lieutenancy area: Dunbartonshire
- Country: Scotland
- Sovereign state: United Kingdom
- Post town: HELENSBURGH
- Postcode district: G84
- Dialling code: 01436
- Police: Scotland
- Fire: Scottish
- Ambulance: Scottish
- UK Parliament: Argyll, Bute and South Lochaber
- Scottish Parliament: Dumbarton
- Website: https://www.garelochhead.info/

Garelochhead (Scottish Gaelic: Ceann a' Gheàrrloch) is a small village on the Gare Loch in Argyll and Bute, Scotland. It is the nearest village to HM Naval Base Clyde.

Garelochhead lies 7 miles (11 kilometres) northwest of Helensburgh. Loch Lomond is a few miles to the east, and Loch Long to the west. In addition to the few local shops, pub and church, it has a bowling club and two community buildings – the Gibson Hall and Centre 81, which is home to Route 81 youth project, gym, café, computer suite and meeting rooms. There is also a gallery featuring work by Scottish artists.

Garelochhead is served by Garelochhead railway station on the West Highland Line and a local bus service running between Coulport and Helensburgh.

== History ==
Garelochhead, originally in Dunbartonshire, now in Argyll and Bute, developed from the 1820s after the introduction of Clyde steamer services, which brought families to summer villas, and day trippers, notably during the Glasgow Fair holiday. Tourism was boosted with the opening of the West Highland Railway line to Fort William in 1894. Garelochhead Forest lies to the south.

In 1854 there was a great dispute that became known as the "Battle of Garelochhead" between the locals, led by Sir James Colquhoun, and the passengers of the steamship Emperor. The trouble started when Colquhoun did not want trippers on the sabbath day. The battle was eventually won by the passengers, but undeterred Colquhoun took his case to the courts who subsequently banned sailings on Sundays.

Garelochhead was a summer destination for people from Glasgow who would arrive from the Gare Loch and spend time in one of the Garelochhead hotels.

To he south, at nearby Faslane Bay, Military Port No. 1 was constructed during World War II, and postwar became the Clyde Submarine Base, since renamed HMNB Clyde. Garelochhead was extended as workers settled in the area.

Following transport advancements, holidaymakers stopped coming to Garelochhead. During the 1990s, two of the town's hotels, The Dahlandui and Garelochhead Hotel, burnt down in fires.

In the last ten years, due to lack of attendance the local Roman Catholic chapel has closed down, with Garelochhead Parish Church in the town holding a combined congregation of both Protestant and Catholic.

The Gibson Hall is commonly used as headquarters for cycle races around the Coulport peninsula, such as the Scottish Cycling national road race that was organised by Lomond Roads Cycling Club.

Garelochhead Training Area is a military training facility located nearby.
