= Glen Fruin =

Glen in Scotland

Coordinates: 56°3′13″N 4°44′37″W

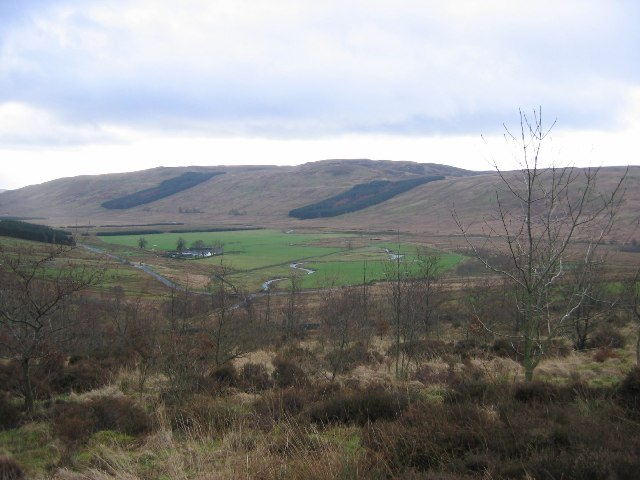
Looking south-east down Glen Fruin from above Faslane

Glen Fruin (Scottish Gaelic: Gleann Freòin) is a glen in Scotland, adjacent to Loch Lomond. It contains the Fruin Water which flows into the loch, and a road, now the A817 road, known as the Glen Fruin Haul Road, which goes from the A82 up the glen and over the top of the hills to HMNB Clyde at Garelochhead.

The road from Glen Fruin to Loch Long was known as Scottish Gaelic: Rathad Mòr nan Gàidheal, (in English "The High Road of the Gaels/Highlanders").

== History ==
=== Roadways ===
It was originally built as a temporary private road on land leased from Luss Estates to facilitate construction of the Trident facility at RNAD Coulport thus avoiding heavy vehicles using narrow roads on the Rosneath Peninsula. After lobbying by the local authority, it was agreed that it would be upgraded to adoptable standard and opened as a public road.

=== Battle of Glen Fruin ===
It was the site of the Battle of Glen Fruin, one of the last clan battles in Scotland, in which an estimated 300 warriors on foot from the MacGregor Clan claimed victory over an estimated 600-800 men from the Colquhoun Clan. The latter were a mix of mounted and foot soldiers.

=== 2024 oil spill ===
On 2 January 2024, oil was detected in the waterways by The Scottish Environment Protection Agency. Following this detection, roadways in the area were limited, and a multi-council cleanup and repair operation began. As of July, 2024, the operation is still underway.
