= Loch Long =

Sea-loch in Argyll and Bute, Scotland

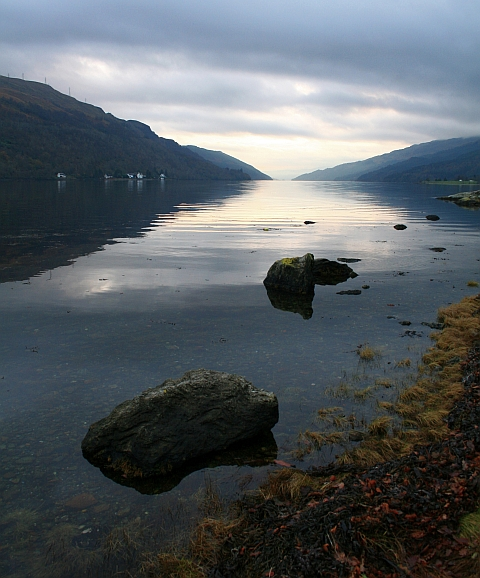
- Looking down Loch Long from the torpedo testing facility. The houses to the left are at Ardmay.

- Location within Argyll and Bute
- Location: Argyll and Bute, Scotland.
- Coordinates: 56.034395°N 4.8855839°W, grid reference NS2031486146
- Type: Sea Loch
- Basin countries: Scotland, United Kingdom
- Frozen: No

Loch Long is a body of water in the council area of Argyll and Bute, Scotland. The sea loch extends from the Firth of Clyde at its southwestern end, to the Arrochar Alps at the head of the loch. It measures approximately 20 miles (30 kilometres) in length, with a width of between one and two miles (two and three kilometres). The loch also has an arm, Loch Goil, on its western side.

Loch Long forms part of the coast of the Cowal Peninsula, and forms the entire western coastline of the Rosneath Peninsula.

Loch Long was historically the boundary between Argyll and Dunbartonshire; however, boundary redrawing in 1996 meant that it moved wholly within the council area of Argyll and Bute.

== Villages on Loch Long ==
Villages and hamlets on the loch include.

- Arrochar
- Succoth
- Portincaple
- Coulport
- Ardpeaton
- Cove
- Ardgartan
- Ardentinny
- Blairmore

== History ==
The name is not a reference to the loch's length; it actually comes from the Gaelic for "ship lake". Prior to their defeat at the Battle of Largs in 1263, Viking raiders sailed up Loch Long to Arrochar, and then dragged their longships 2 miles overland to Tarbet and into Loch Lomond. Being inland, the settlements around Loch Lomond were more vulnerable to attack.

=== Transport ===
The steamboat Chancellor used to traverse the loch, departing Dunoon at 11:00 and returning about five hours later. PS Waverley was also built to serve Loch Long and Loch Goil from 1947, a route that she still sailed as of 2021, albeit as more of an attraction than a primary means of transport.

=== Fishing ===
The Annual Reports of the Fishery Board for Scotland provide an insight into the state of fishing from Loch Long in the years before the First World War. In the report for 1900 we learn that "poor success attended the various fishings in Loch Long and Goil. The herring fishing in these lochs was the poorest for a number of years, and as a consequence the resident crews deserted thse waters for Kilbrennan Sound where they did fairly well."

Fishery Statistics

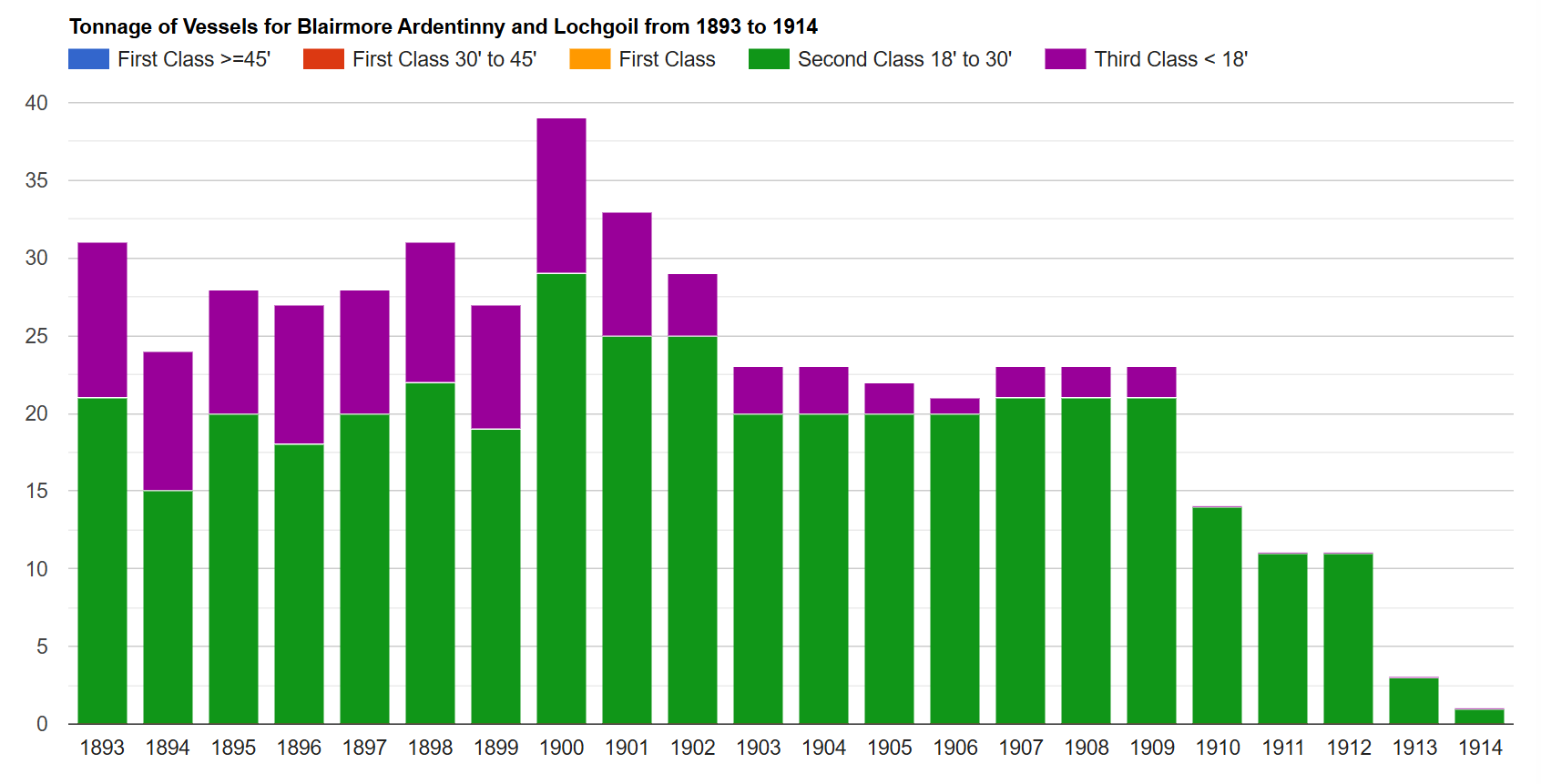
Blairmore Ardentinny and Lochgoil tonnage of vessels

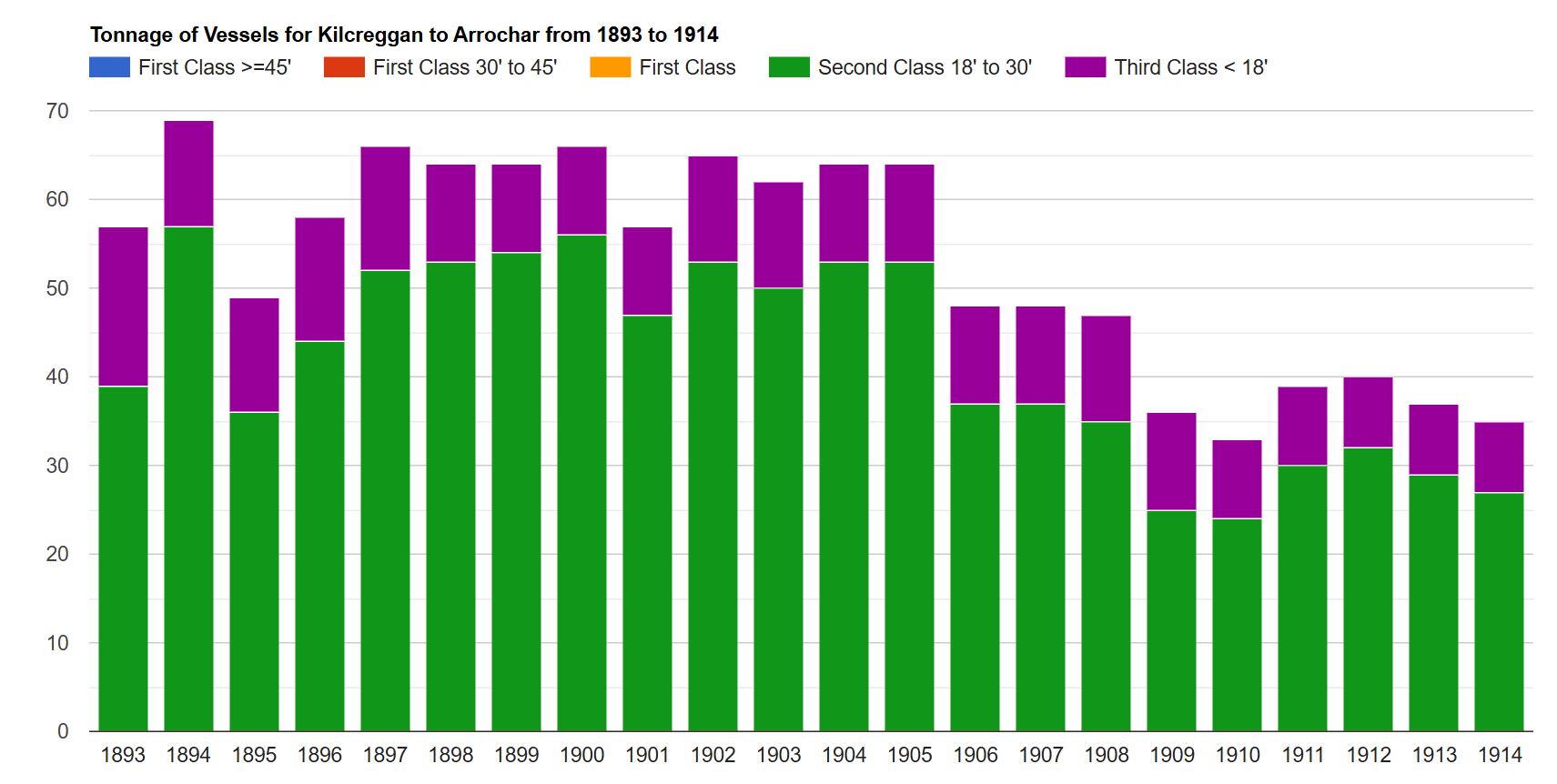
Kilcreggan to Arrochar tonnage of vessels

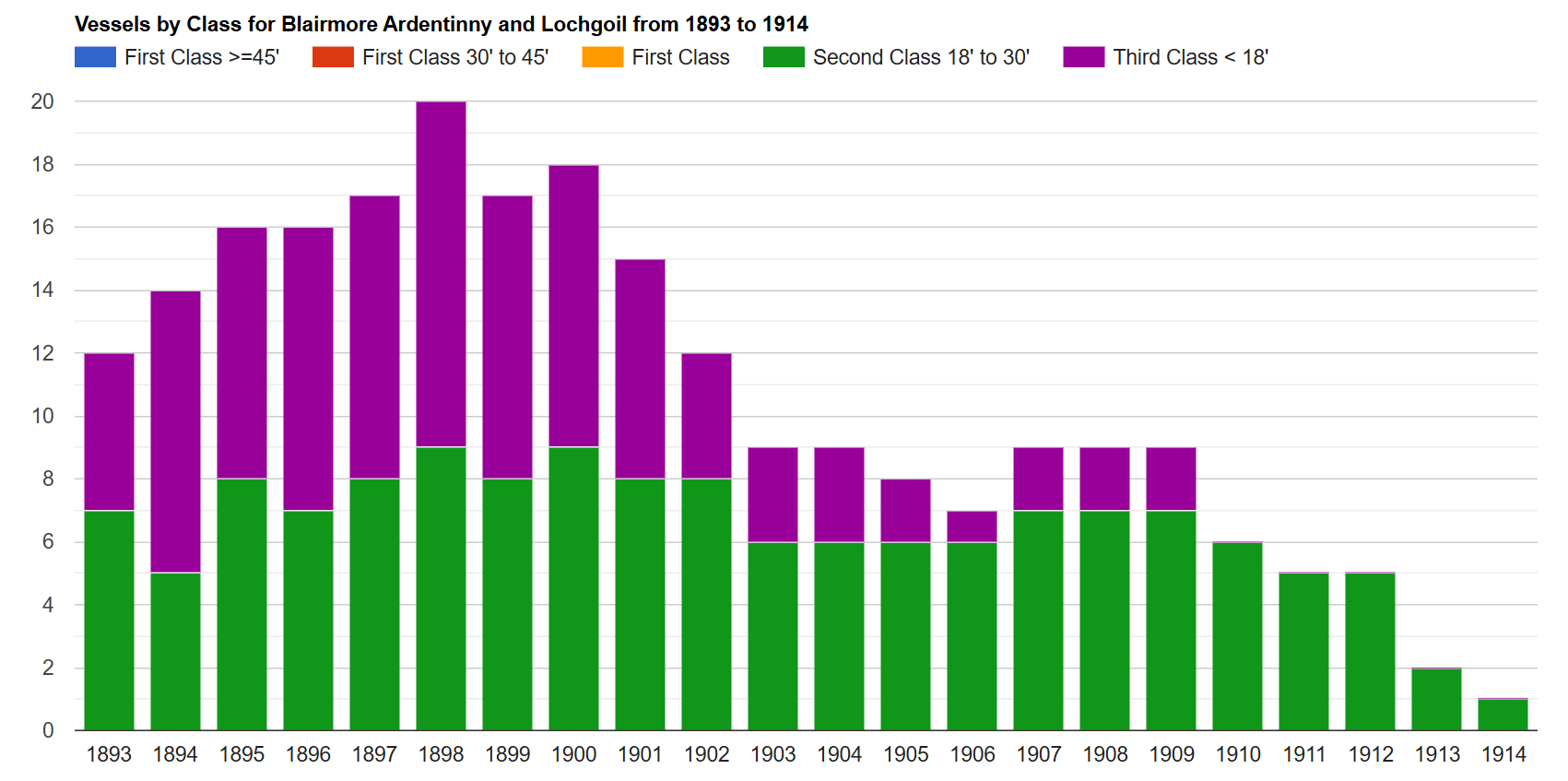
Blairmore Ardentinny and Lochgoil vessels by class

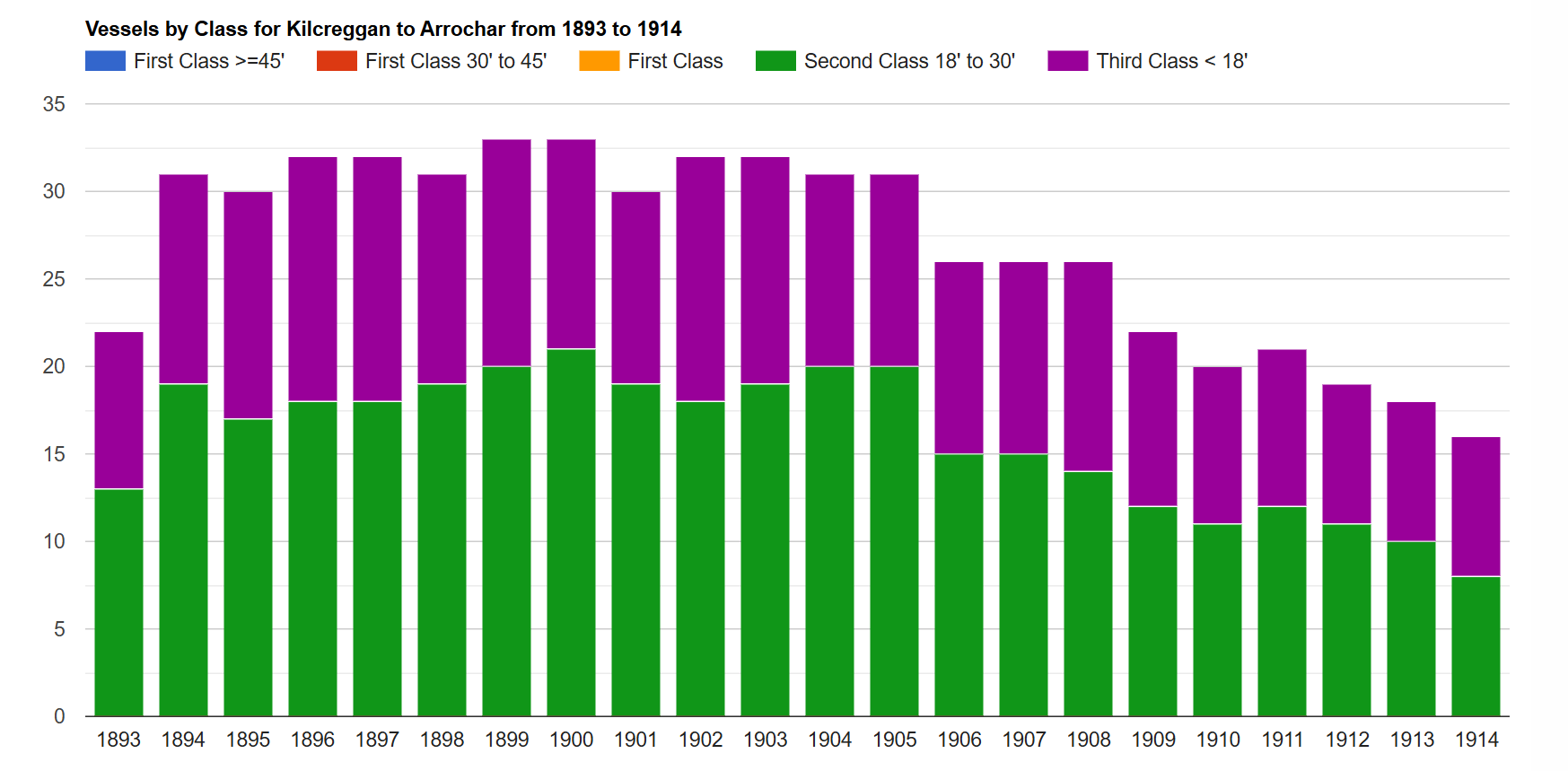
Kilcreggan to Arrochar vessels by class

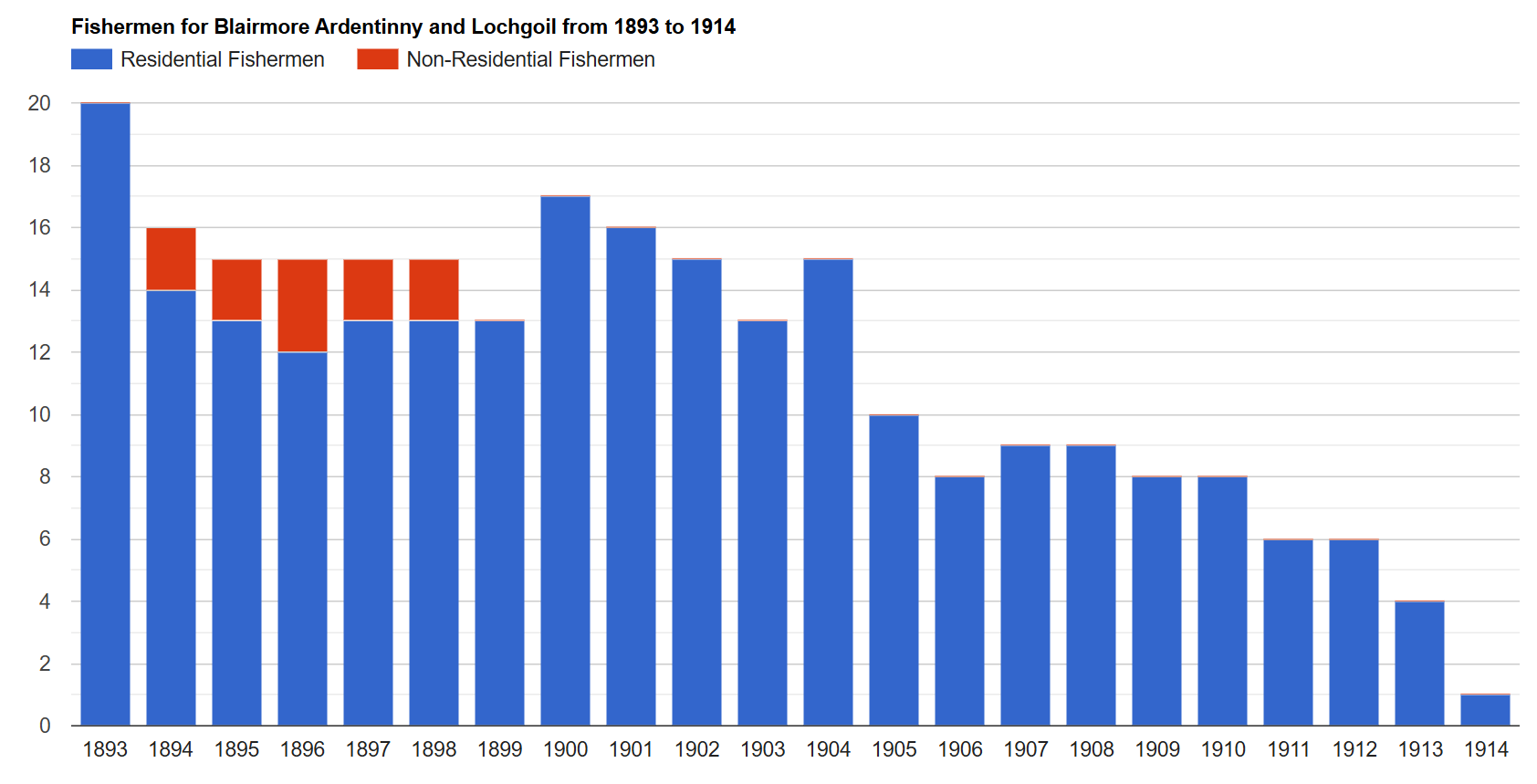
Blairmore Ardentinny and Lochgoil fishermen

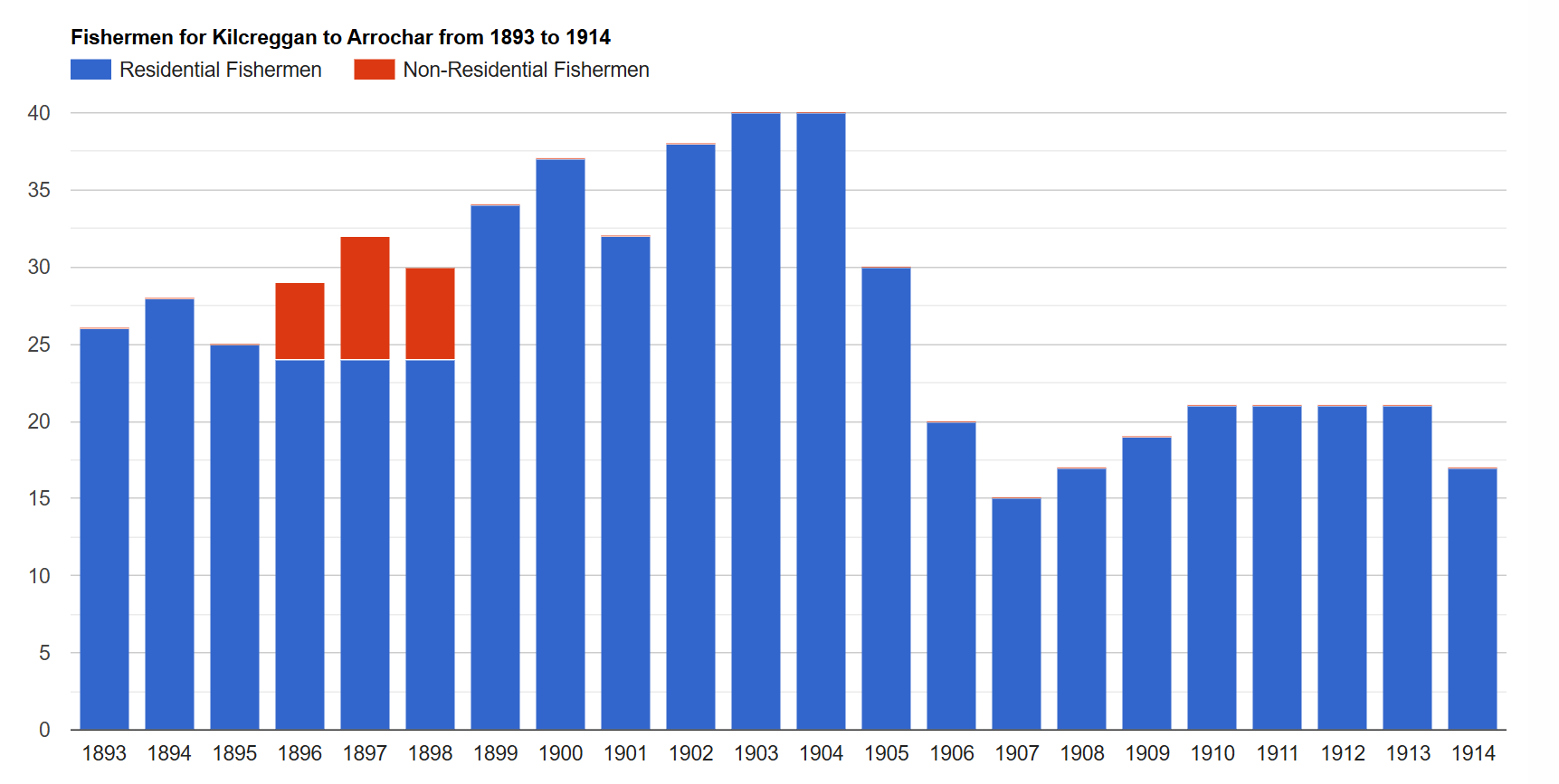
Kilcreggan to Arrochar fishermen

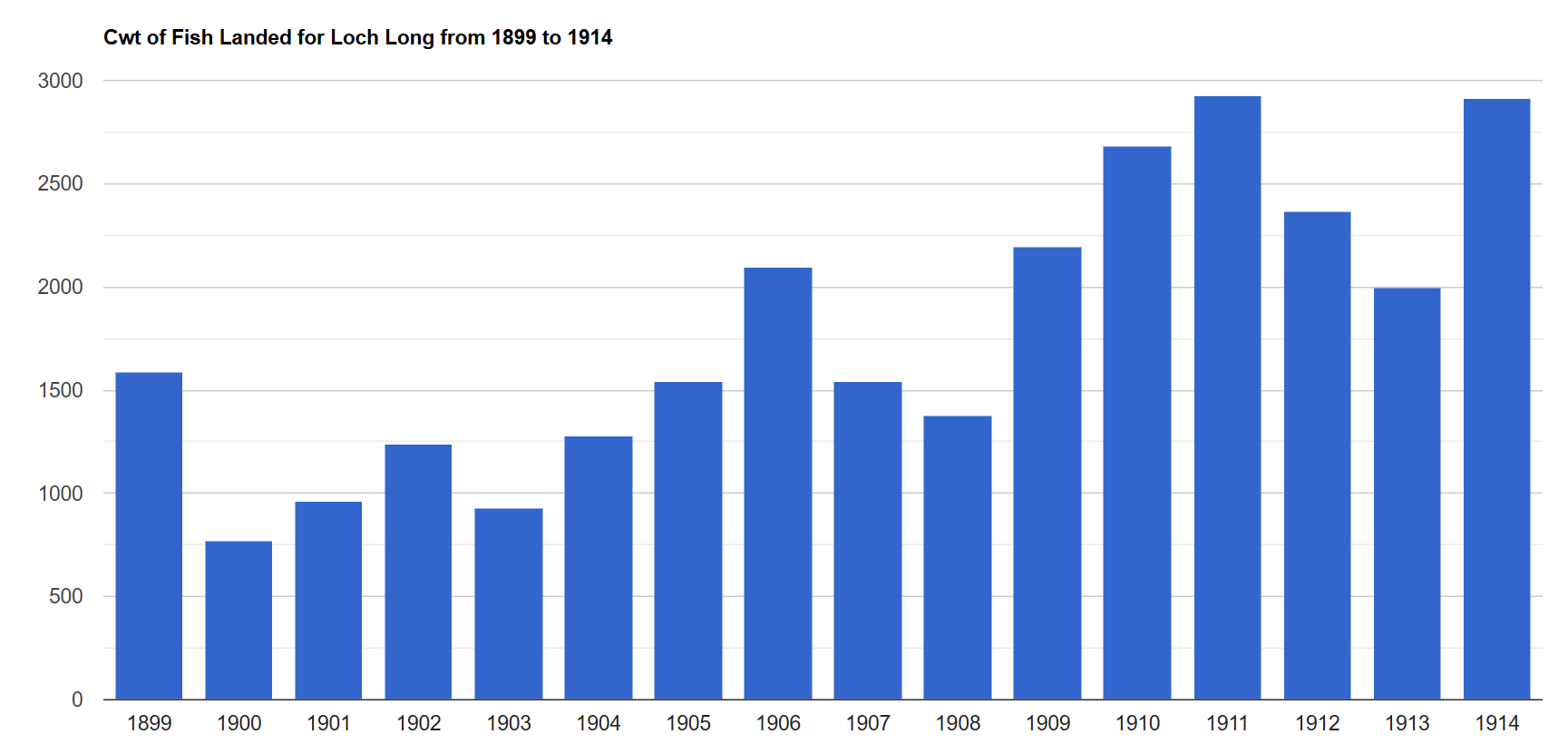
Cwt of fish landed

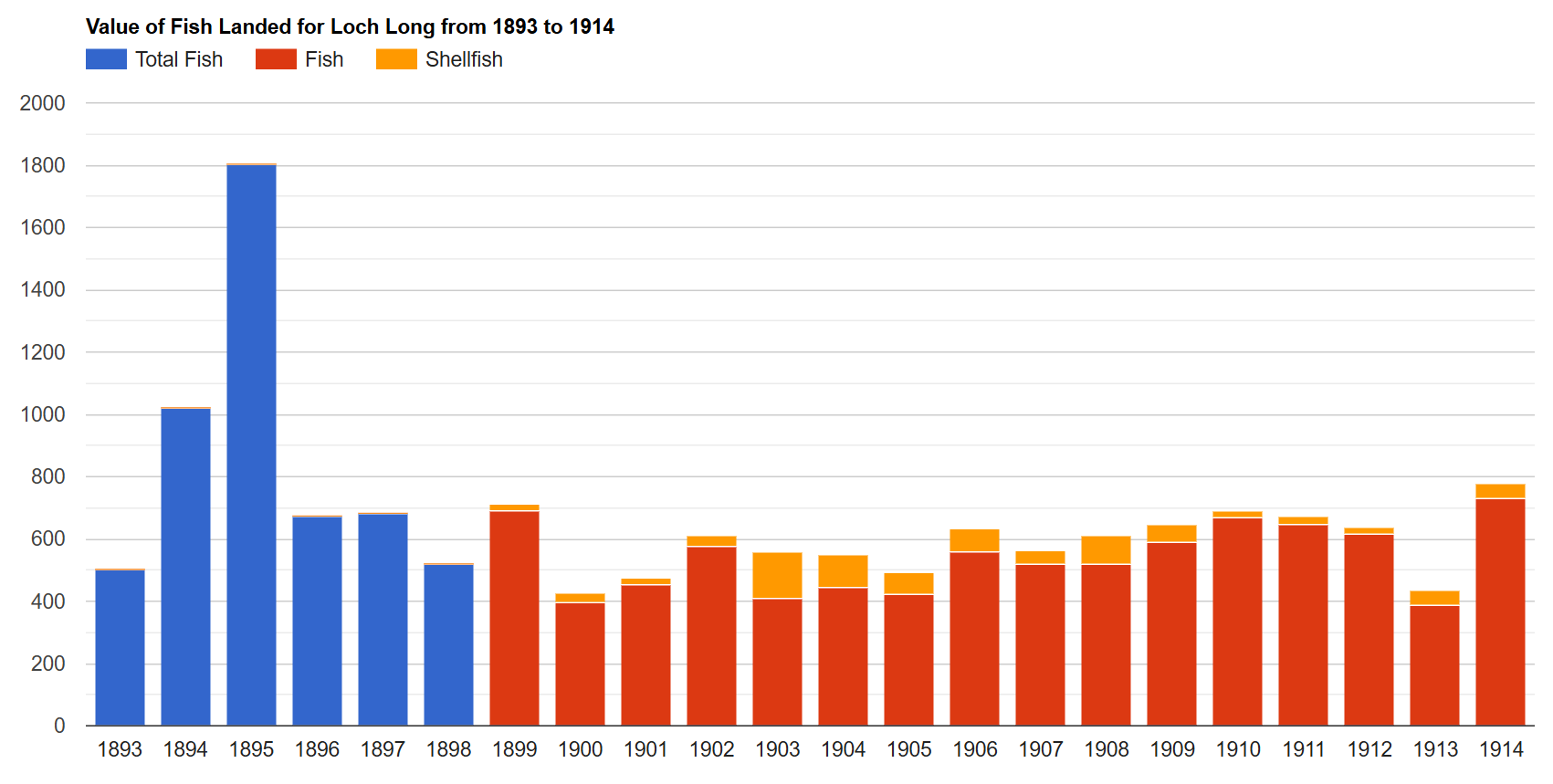
Value (£) of fish landed

== Royal Navy ==
On the eastern shore of the Loch is the Royal Navy's Coulport Armament depot, with the Glen Mallan jetty, both part of Defence Munitions Glen Douglas. Part of the extensive Royal Navy's, His Majesty's Naval Base Clyde.

=== Historic ===
In Arrochar, the Royal Naval Torpedo Testing Station and Range was established on the Loch in 1912, in connection with the Clyde Torpedo Works on Eldon Street, Greenock, established in 1910. Both sites are now closed.

== Finnart Oil Terminal ==
The Finnart Oil Terminal is located on the eastern shore of the loch, linked to the Grangemouth Refinery via a 58-mile-long (93-kilometre) pipeline.

In September 2024, it was announced that the oil terminal is scheduled for closure.

== Environment and concerns ==
Loch Long has a long term issue with rubbish collecting at the head of the loch. Rubbish mainly washed down water courses from the Glasgow area.

From about 2010 to 2025, due to inadequate maintenance of 1,500 water pipes at RNAD Coulport, some tritium used periodically to replenish Trident nuclear weapons leaked into Loch Long, constituting a low level of radioactive pollution. Analysis by Scottish Environment Protection Agency suggested that up to half of the pipeline components at the base were beyond their design life.

== Gallery ==
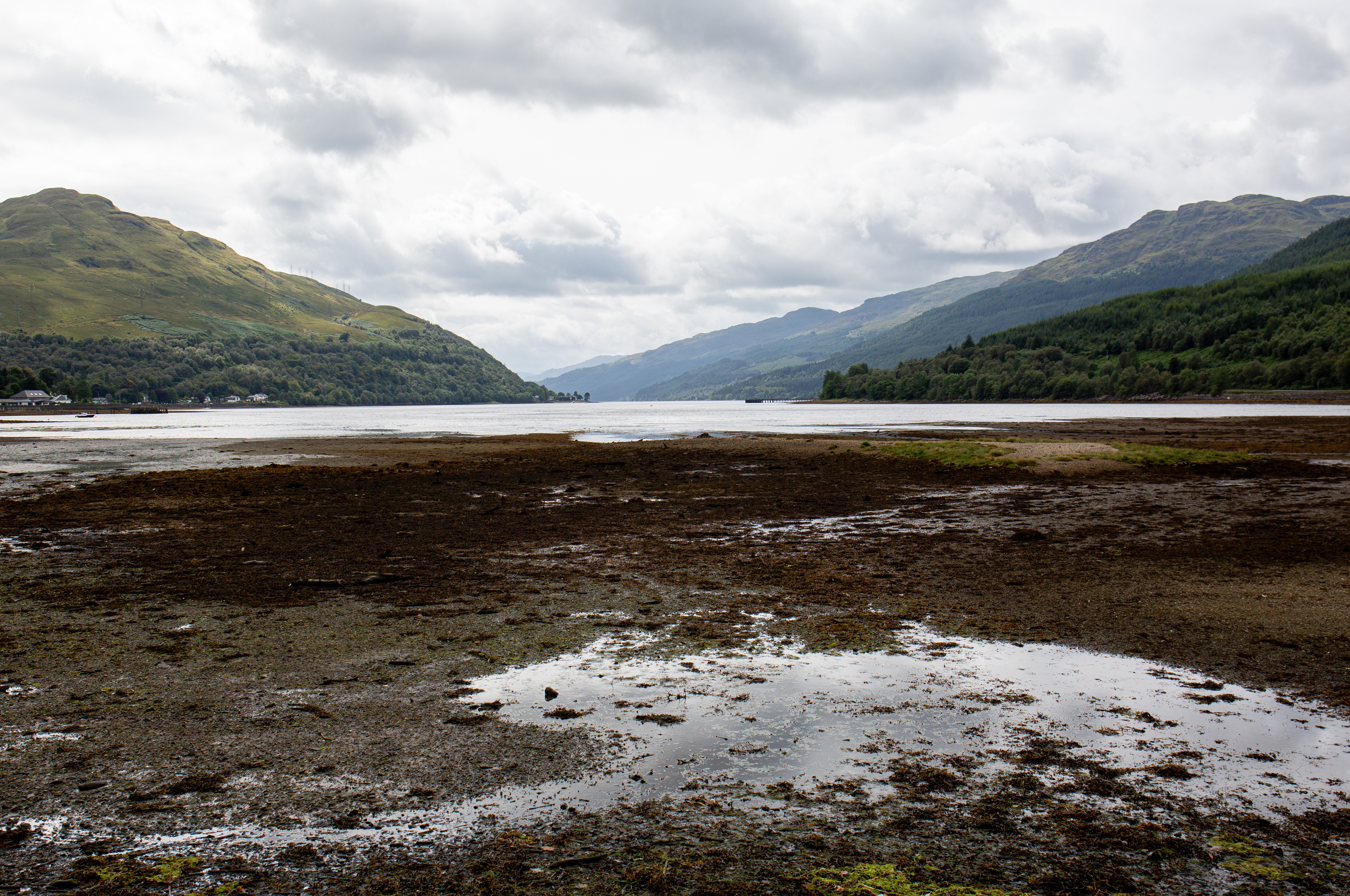
20210815 Loch Long

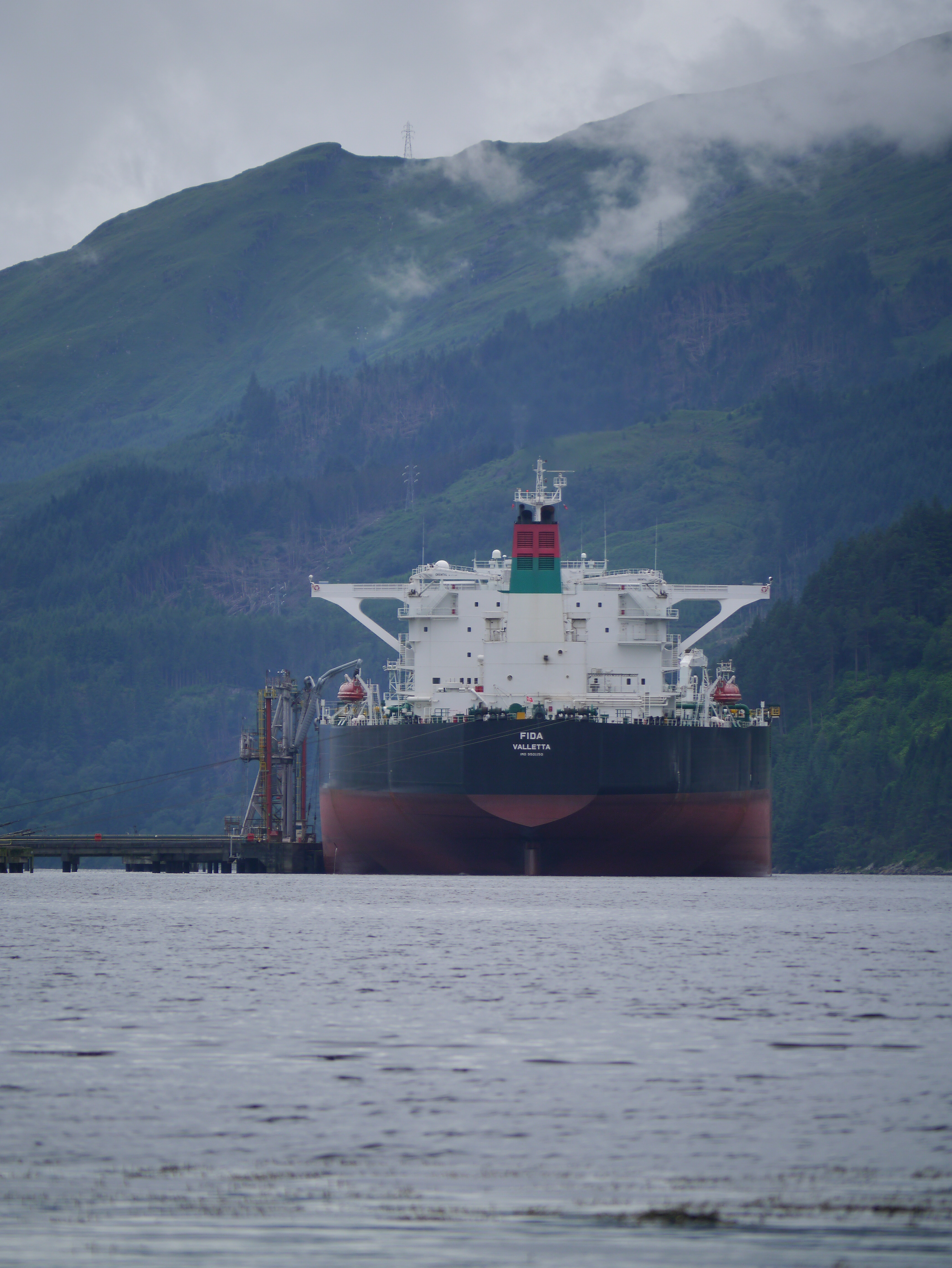
'Fida' In Loch Long

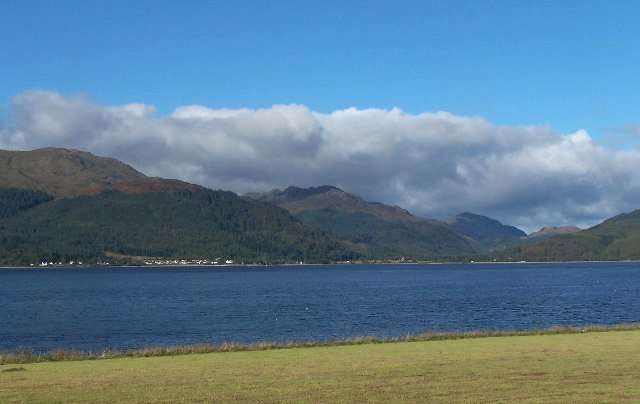
Loch Long and Ardentinny

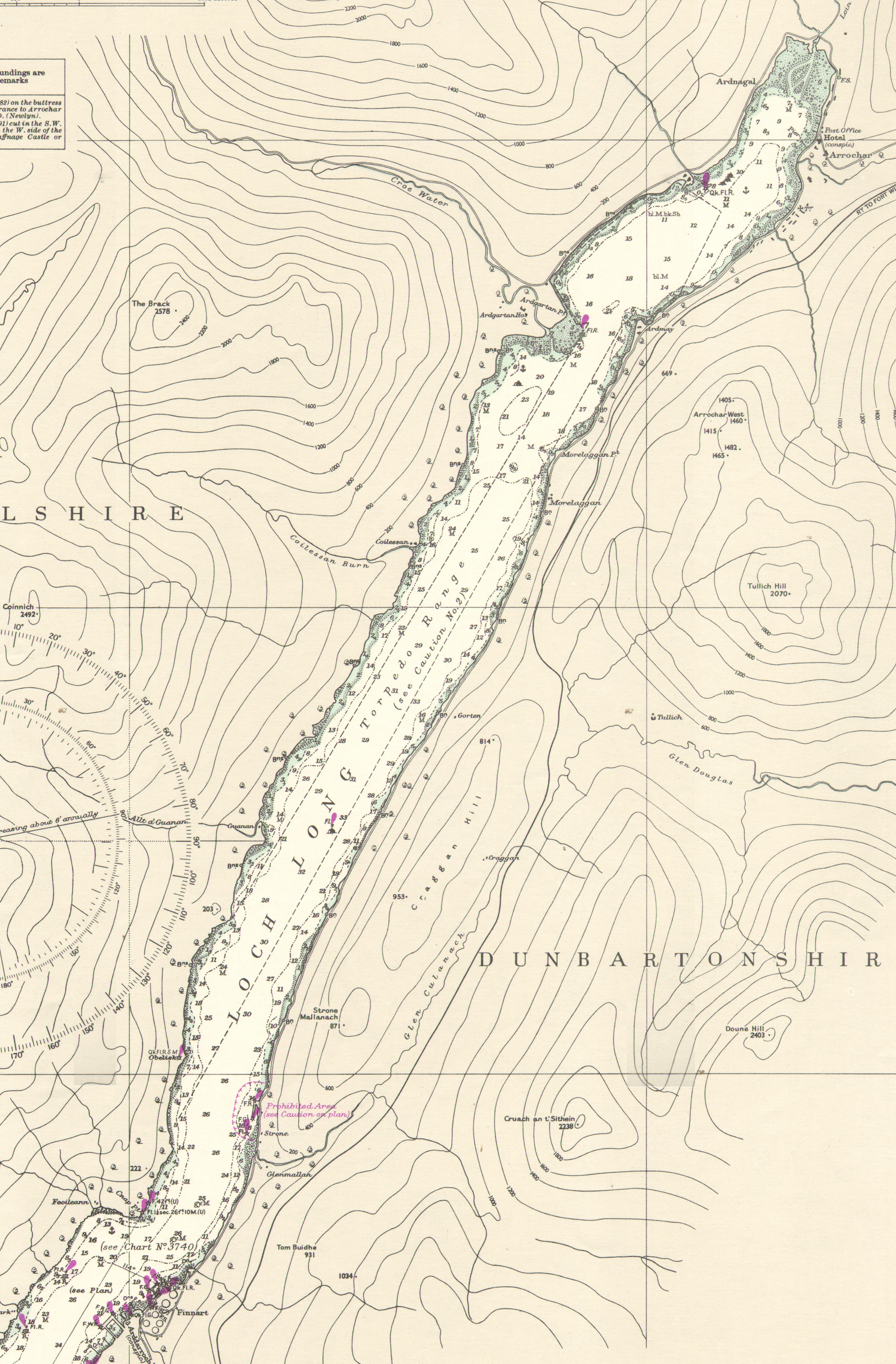
Admiralty Chart No 3739

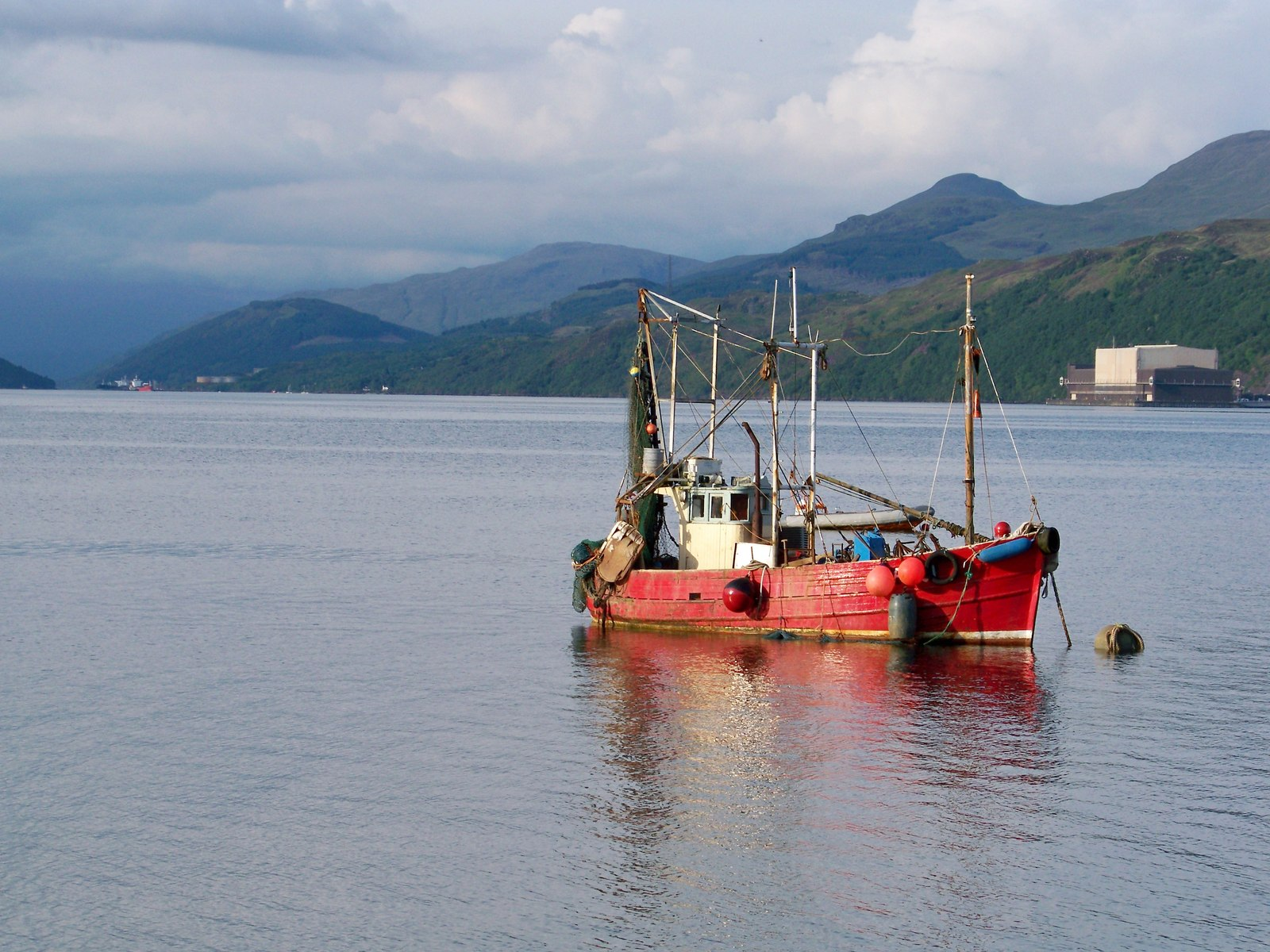
Loch Long At Ardentinny
