= Bidein a' Choire Sheasgaich =

Mountain in Scotland

- Bidean Coire an t-Seasgaich
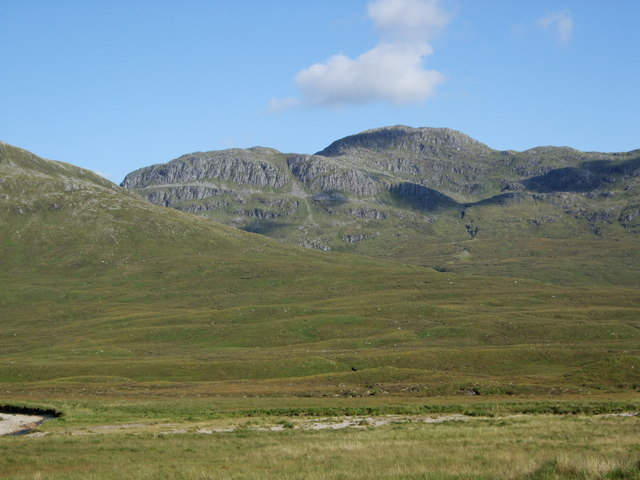
- Bidein a' Choire Sheasgaich, north face, from Bearnais bothy

Highest point
- Elevation: 945 m (3,100 ft)
- Prominence: 209 m (686 ft)
- Parent peak: Lurg Mhòr
- Listing: Munro, Marilyn
- Coordinates: 57°25′11″N 05°15′2″W

Naming
- English translation: peak of the barren corrie/reedy corrie/corrie of barren cattle (Note: Bennet suggests "peak of the corrie of the barren cattle" or "milkless cattle", Butterfield: "little peak of the reedy corrie", Bailey: "pinnacle of corrie of farrow cattle".)
- Language of name: Gaelic

Geography
- Location within Highland
- Location: Attadale Estate, Scotland
- Parent range: Northwest Highlands
- OS grid: NH049413
- Topo map(s): OS Landranger 25; Explorer 429

Bidein a' Choire Sheasgaich (Scottish Gaelic: Bidean Coire an t-Seasgaich) is a remote mountain in the Northwest Highlands of Scotland. It is a Munro with a height of 945 metres (3,100 ft) and is at the western end of an east–west ridge comprising a Munro Top Meall Mor (974 metres), and the Munro Lurg Mhòr (986 metres).

== Geographical situation and topography ==
Loch Monar and surrounding Munros

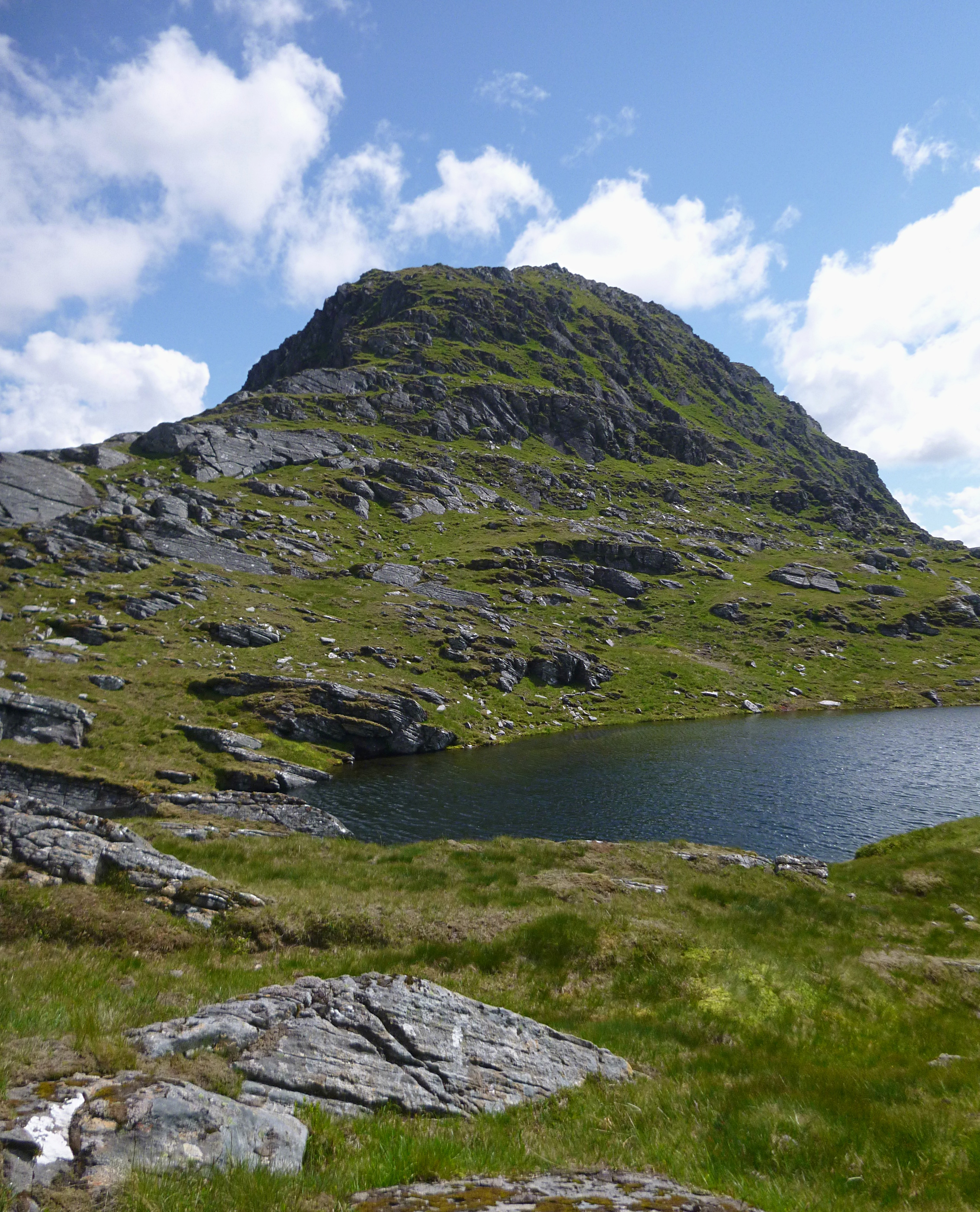
North face of the mountain with lochan at head of Coire Seasgach (Note: The OS spell the mountain "Bidein a' Choire Sheasgaich" and the corrie "Coire Seasgach")

Bidein a' Choire Sheasgaich, is situated west of Loch Monar (Note: Loch Monar is not to be confused with Loch Morar, another remote west coast loch.) and east of the strath of Bearneas and the Attadale Forest, and is at the apex of a horseshoe of Munros around the loch. Glen Carron lies to the north and Glen Shiel to the south.

The mountain, also known by the nickname "Cheese Grater", is located on the Attadale Estate. The bedrock is of the Glenfinnan Group of the Loch Ness Supergroup – highly metamorphosed sedimentary sandstone.

The summit it guarded by crags to the north and east but there is a straightforward approach via Sail Riabach a kilometre or so to the southwest. The ridge between Bidein and Lurg Mhor and the path from the south have no technical difficulties.

== Approaches to the mountain ==
Bidein a' Choire Sheasgaich and Lurg Mhòr are, according to Cameron McNeish, "two of the loneliest Munros in the land" An approach can be made from the north, the east or the west. All the approach routes are long and arduous but, if a two-day expedition is planned, three open bothies are available as an alternative to wild camping.

The route from the east is along, and possibly around, Loch Monar which is reached through Glen Strathfarrar. From Struy a private road goes along the glen to the foot of the loch at Monar Lodge. Cycling is allowed and a very limited number of vehicles are also permitted access. (Note: Mountaineering Scotland publish the Strathfarrar access agreement.) Even if using a mountain bike the expedition is, according to Dan Bailey "a single epic trip, which can be undertaken either as an appealingly brutal one-day assault or a slower overnighter". The route round the loch traversing these Munros and the three immediately north of the loch is 43 km (27 mi) plus 52 km (32 mi) cycling – 18 hours.

The shortest route to the mountain from a public road is from Achnashellach (Lair) in Glen Carron to the north on the A890 but to start off it is necessary to wade across the River Carron or use the two-wire bridge – cycling is not an option. Otherwise, from Craig nearby there is a somewhat longer route which may be cycled for the first 5.5 km (3.4 mi) – this way the total distance to Bidean is 12.5 km (7.8 mi) – 5 hours on foot.

Bearnais bothy is a Mountain Bothies Association bothy not far off these routes and for a stop-over it is conveniently located. However, a less hilly route to get there directly is from Achintee (Strathcarron station) from where it may be reached by a stalkers' path of 9.7 km (6 mi).

From the west at Attadale there is an 13 km (8 mi) track along which a mountain bike may be ridden, with difficulty, to the open bothy at Ben Dronaig Lodge which is maintained by the Attadale Estate to a very high standard. From bothy to Bidein is another 7.2 km (4.5 mi) on a stalkers' path. A shorter 9.7 km (6 mi) stalkers' path leads to this bothy from Achintee (Strathcarron station).

Maol Bhuidhe bothy is an MBA bothy which can be reached from Atterdale or Killian (Camus-luinie carpark) on mountain bike by tracks at least 16 km (10 mi) long.
