= Lurg Mhòr =

Mountain in Scotland

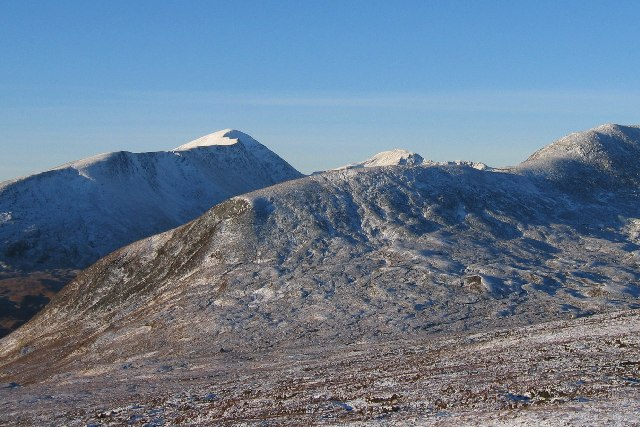
- East ridge leading to the summit of Lurg Mhòr (left of centre)

Highest point
- Elevation: 986 m (3,235 ft)
- Prominence: 442 m (1,450 ft)
- Listing: Munro, Marilyn
- Coordinates: 57°24′48″N 05°13′24″W

Naming
- English translation: big ridge stretching into the plain / big shin
- Language of name: Gaelic

Geography
- Location within Highland
- Location: Attadale Estate, Scotland
- Parent range: Northwest Highlands
- OS grid: NH064404
- Topo map(s): OS Landranger 25; Explorer 429 / 430

Lurg Mhòr is a remote 986-metre (3,235 ft) mountain, a Munro, in the Northwest Highlands of Scotland at the high point of an east–west range of hills comprising Meall Mor (974 metres), Lurg Mhòr and Bidein a' Choire Sheasgaich (945 metres).

== Geographical situation and topography ==
Loch Monar and surrounding Munros

Lurg Mhòr, is situated west of Loch Monar (Note: Loch Monar is not to be confused with Loch Morar, another remote west coast loch.) and east of the strath of Bearneas and the Attadale Forest, is one of a horseshoe of Munros around the loch. Glen Carron lies to the north and Glen Shiel to the south. The west ridge of Lurg Mhòr curves round to the north before rising to Bidein a' Choire Sheasgaich, a separate Munro. Lurg Mhòr has a long, relatively flat east ridge where Meall Mhor (a Munro Top) is situated. The ridge is narrow in places and some scrambling (which cannot be avoided easily) is required between Lurg Mhòr and Meall Mhor. This ridge has steep cliffs facing north but on the southern side the slope is gentle and grassy. The ridge leads down to Loch Monar at Pait Lodge.

The mountain is located on the Attadale Estate. The bedrock is of the Glenfinnan Group of the Loch Ness Supergroup – highly metamorphosed sedimentary sandstone.

== Approaches to the mountain ==
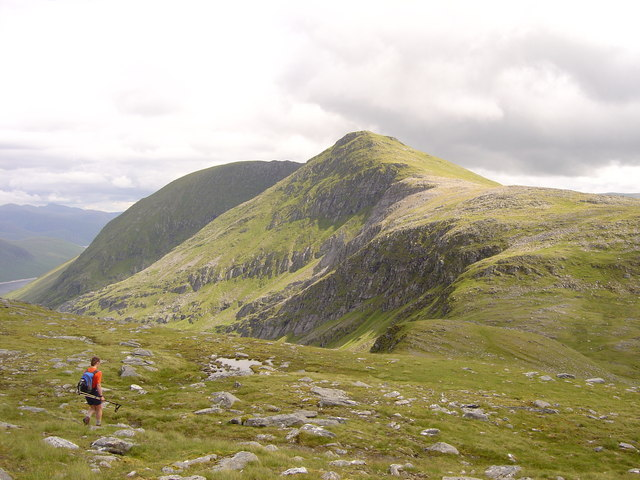
Approaching Lurg Mhòr from Bidein a' Choire Sheasgaich

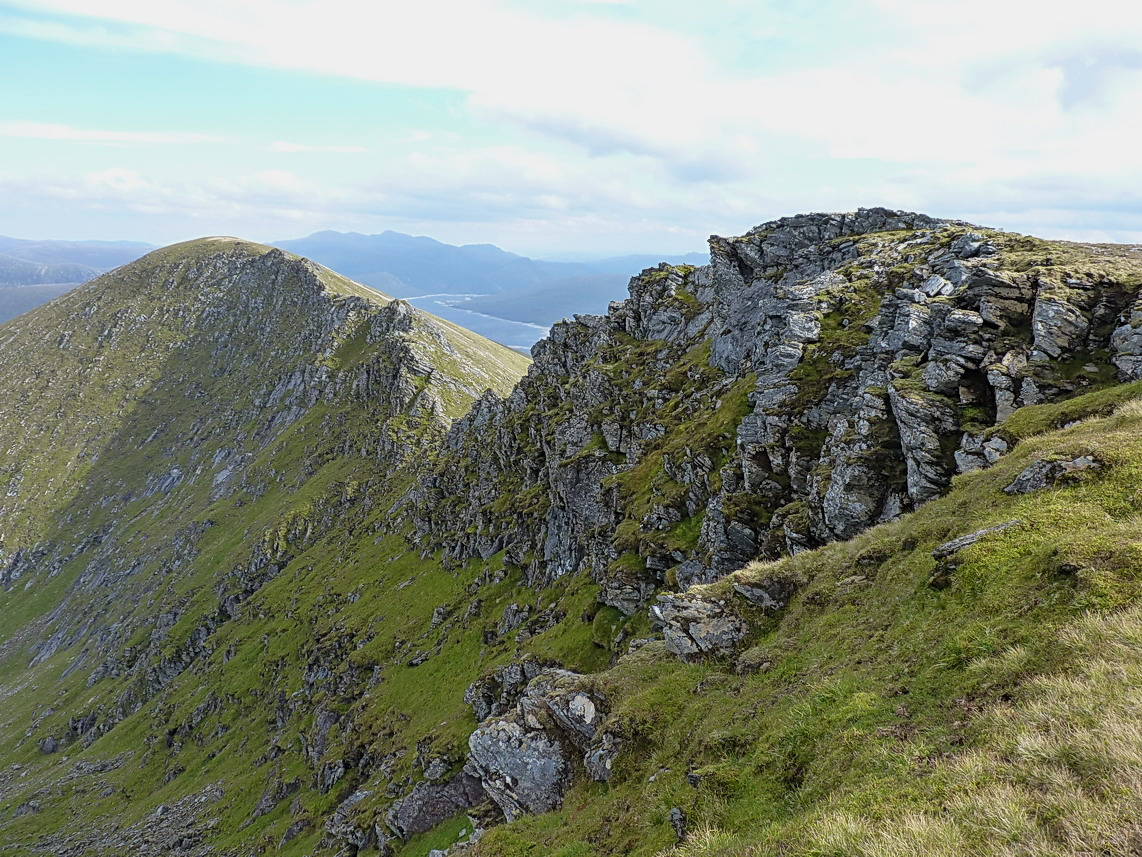
East ridge, north face

Lurg Mhòr and Bidein a' Choire Sheasgaich are, according to Cameron McNeish, "two of the lonliest Munros in the land" An approach can be made from the north, the east or the west. All the approach routes are long and arduous but, if a two-day expedition is planned, three open bothies are available as an alternative to wild camping.

The route from the east is along, and possibly around, Loch Monar which is reached through Glen Strathfarrar. From Struy a private road goes along the glen to the foot of the loch at Monar Lodge. Cycling is allowed and a very limited number of vehicles are also permitted access. (Note: Mountaineering Scotland publish the Strathfarrar access agreement.) Even if using a mountain bike the expedition is, according to Dan Bailey "a single epic trip, which can be undertaken either as an appealingly brutal one-day assault or a slower overnighter". The route round the loch traversing these Munros and the three immediately north of the loch is 43 km (27 mi) plus 52 km (32 mi) cycling – 18 hours.

The shortest route to the mountain from a public road is from Achnashellach (Lair) in Glen Carron to the north on the A890 but to start off it is necessary to wade across the River Carron or use the two-wire bridge – cycling is not an option. Otherwise, from Craig nearby there is a somewhat longer route which may be cycled for the first 5.5 km (3.4 mi) – this way the total distance to Lurg Mhòr is 14.5 km (9.0 mi) – 5 hours 30 minutes on foot.

Bearnais bothy is a Mountain Bothies Association bothy not far off these routes and for a stop-over it is conveniently located. However, a less hilly route to get there directly is from Achintee (Strathcarron station) from where it may be reached by a stalkers' path of 9.7 km (6 mi).

From the west at Attadale there is an 13 km (8 mi) track along which a mountain bike may be ridden, with difficulty, to the open bothy at Ben Dronaig Lodge which is maintained by the Attadale Estate to a very high standard. From bothy to Lurg Mhòr is another 7.2 km (4.5 mi) on a stalkers' path. A shorter 9.7 km (6 mi) stalkers' path leads to this bothy from Achintee (Strathcarron station).

Maol Bhuidhe bothy is an MBA bothy which can be reached from Atterdale or Killian (Camus-luinie carpark) on mountain bike by tracks at least 16 km (10 mi) long.

== Rock climbs ==
On the north of Lurg Mhòr's west ridge a crag of quartzite provides several routes, two of which are graded very severe.
