= Glen Kinglas =

Glen in Argyll and Bute, Scotland

- Glen
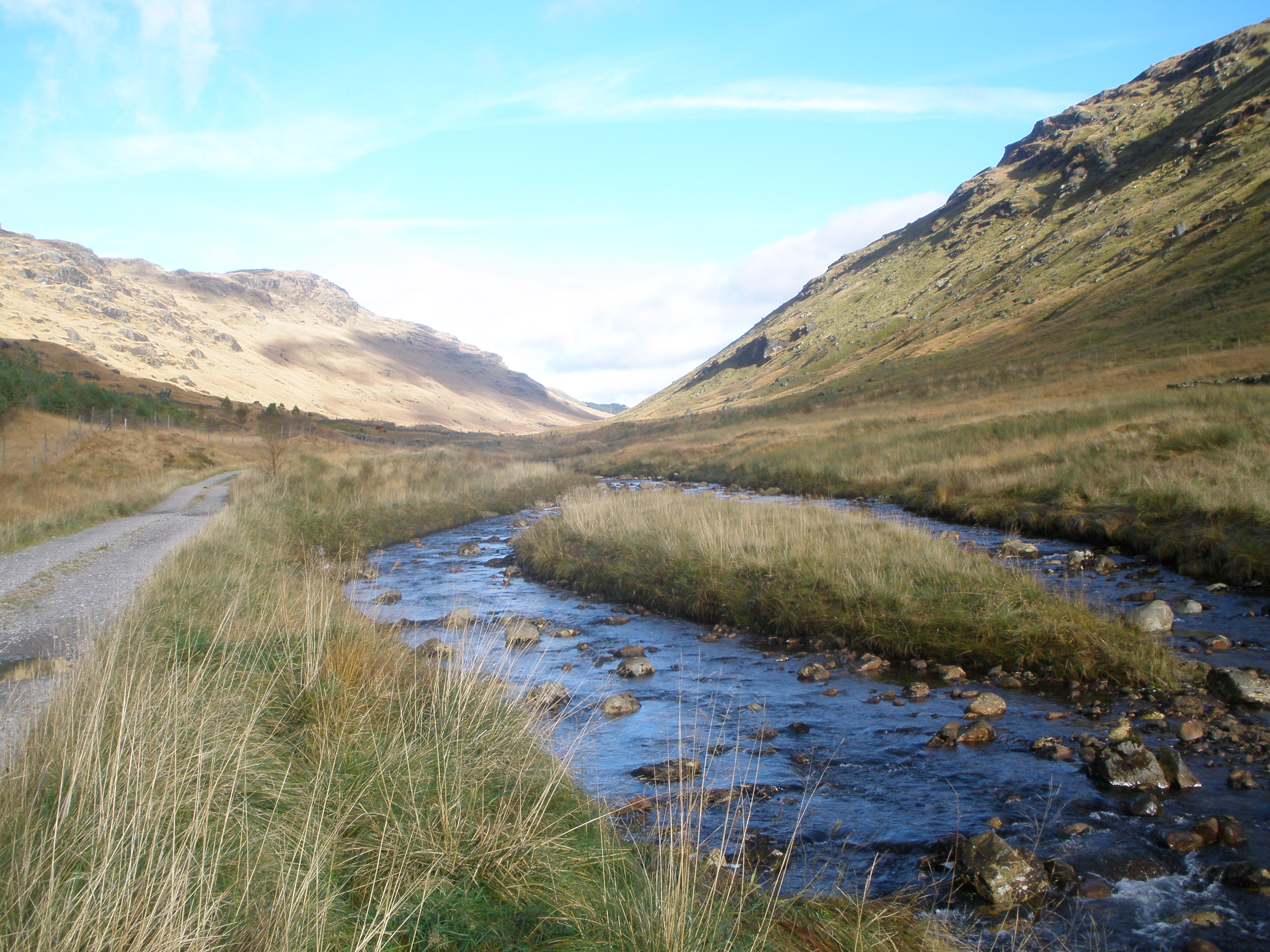
- Kinglas Water in Glen Kinglas

- Coordinates: 56°14′38″N 04°51′55″W
- Grid position: NN 22543 09411
- Location: Cowal Peninsula; Argyll and Bute
- Formed by: glacial erosion

Glen Kinglas is a glen located on the Cowal Peninsula, in Argyll and Bute, west of Scotland. The glen is one of the main glens in the Arrochar Alps, the A83 road from Arrochar and Loch Lomond passes through the glen. At the north end of the glen, a pass leads to Glen Croe, passing Loch Restil. At the south of the glen the A815 road leaves the A83 and leads through the Cowal Peninsula to Dunoon on the Firth of Clyde coast. The A83 continues on past Cairndow and Loch Fyne Oysters to Inveraray and Inveraray Castle on Loch Fyne.

The glen has the Kinglas Water running through it which runs under the Butter Bridge, one of the sources is Loch Restil, located in the pass between Glen Kinglas and Glen Croe.

The Butter Bridge carpark in the glen, gives easy access to the hills and mountains in the area for hillwalkers and climbers. The glen gives access to Beinn an Lochain the highest peak on the Cowal peninsula at 901.7 metres (2,958 ft).

The Mountain Bothies Association opened a Bothy within the glen in May 2022, called Abyssinia. Located at grid ref: NN 256 117, on Ordnance Survey map LR56.

The glen is within the Argyll Forest Park and the Loch Lomond and The Trossachs National Park.

== Mountains ==
The following mountains border Glen Kinglas (from south to north).

West side:

- Binnein an Fhidhleir, Corbett at 817 metres (2,680 ft)
- Creag Bhrosgan, 711 metres (2,333 ft)
- Stob Coire Creagach, 817 metres (2,680 ft)

East side:

- Stob an Eas, 732 metres (2,402 ft)
- Beinn an t-Seilich, 719 metres (2,359 ft)
- Beinn an Lochain, Corbett at 901.7 metres (2,958 ft)
- Beinn Luibhean, Corbett at 857 metres (2,812 ft)
- Beinn Ime, Munro at 1,011 metres (3,317 ft) (Butter Mountain)
- Beinn Chorranach, 888 metres (2,913 ft)
- Ben Vane - Beinn Dubh, 774 metres (2,539 ft)

== Butter Bridge ==
The bridge over Kinglas Water, Butter Bridge, named after Beinn Ìme (Butter Mountain). Built in 1749, as part of the Military Road from Dumbarton to Inveraray. Overseen by Major William Caulfeild of the British Army.

== Landslides ==
The glen was formed by glacial erosion and has repercussions today, as many areas are still unstable.

The A83 is prone to landslides, including the section within Glen Kinglas. The A83 is a main road to the west coast of Scotland. On 8 October 2023, ten people were airlifted off the road by helicopter, as they were trapped by seven separate landslides along a short section of the road.

== Aeroplane crash ==
A RAF Panavia Tornado F3 crashed in the glen, on 2 July 2009, at 1145. Both occupants were killed.

== Glen Kinglas hydro ==
A hydro electric generating station makes use of the Kinglas Water in the south of the glen. It began electricity generation in January 2004. The system installed has a maximum production capacity of 960 kilowatt or 0.96 Megawatt.

== Gallery ==
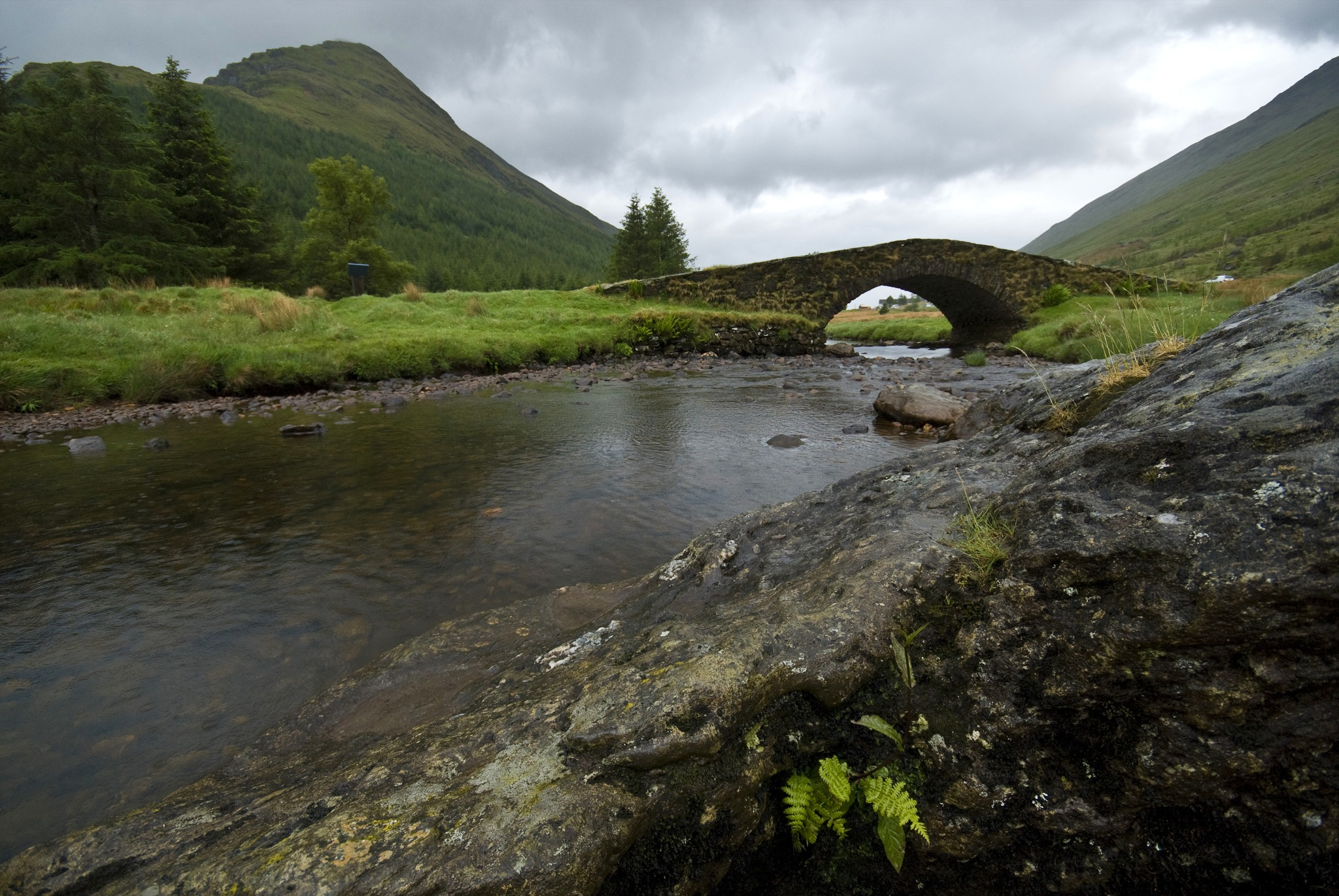
Butter Bridge, Kinglas Water

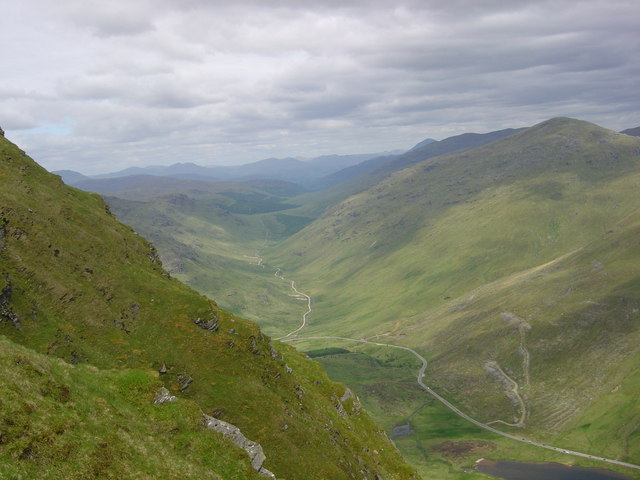
Glen Kinglas

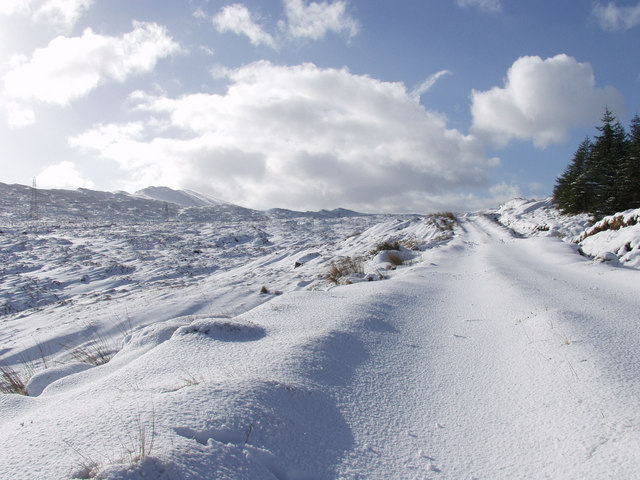
Cold day in Glen Kinglas

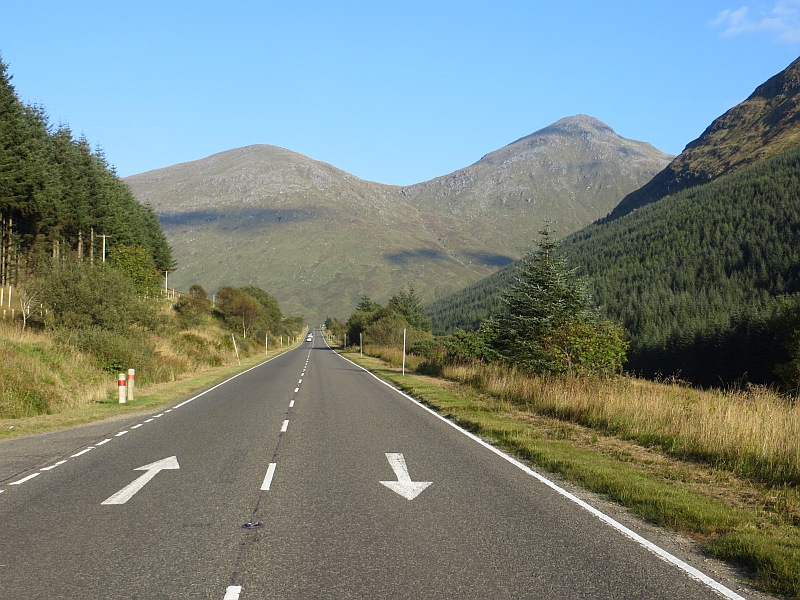
A83, Glen Kinglas

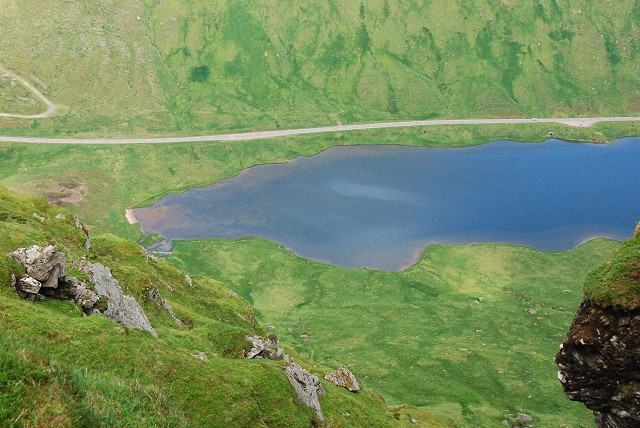
Loch Restil from the north ridge of Beinn an Lochain

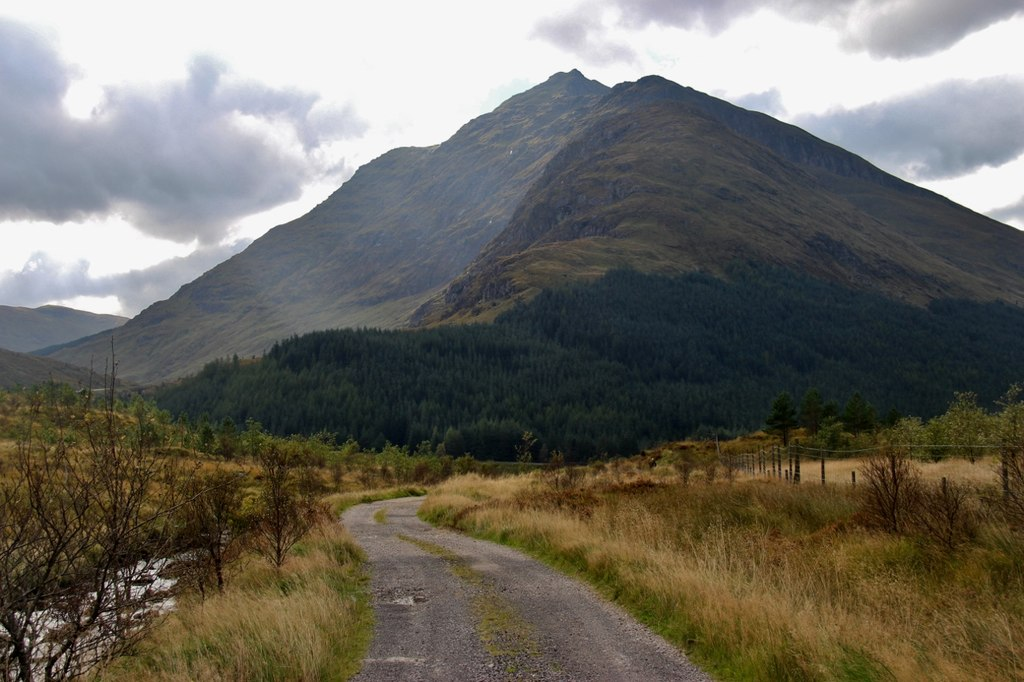
Glen Kinglas towards Beinn an Lochain

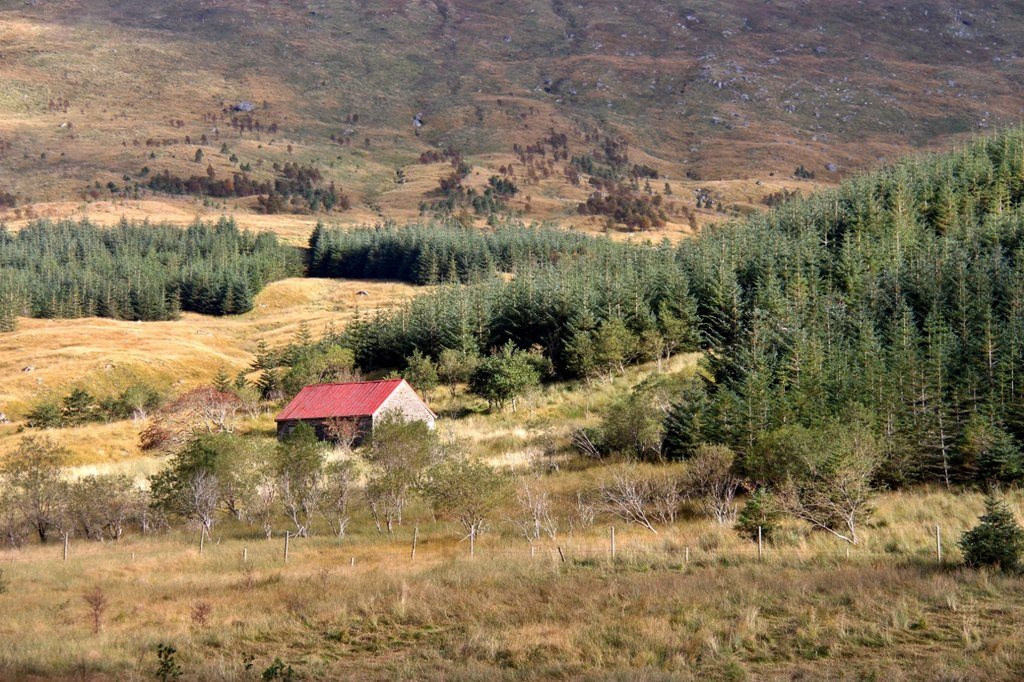
Abyssinia Bothy

== See also ==
- Mountains and hills of Scotland
- Mixed climbing
- Scrambling
- Hillwalking
- The Countryside Code
- Scottish Outdoor Access Code
- List of Mountain Bothies Association bothies
- Mountain Rescue Committee of Scotland
- Scotland's Charity Air Ambulance
- Freedom to roam
- Land Reform (Scotland) Act 2003
