= Beinn an Lochain =

Mountain in the Arrochar Alps, Scotland

Coordinates: 56.23015°N 4.87631°W

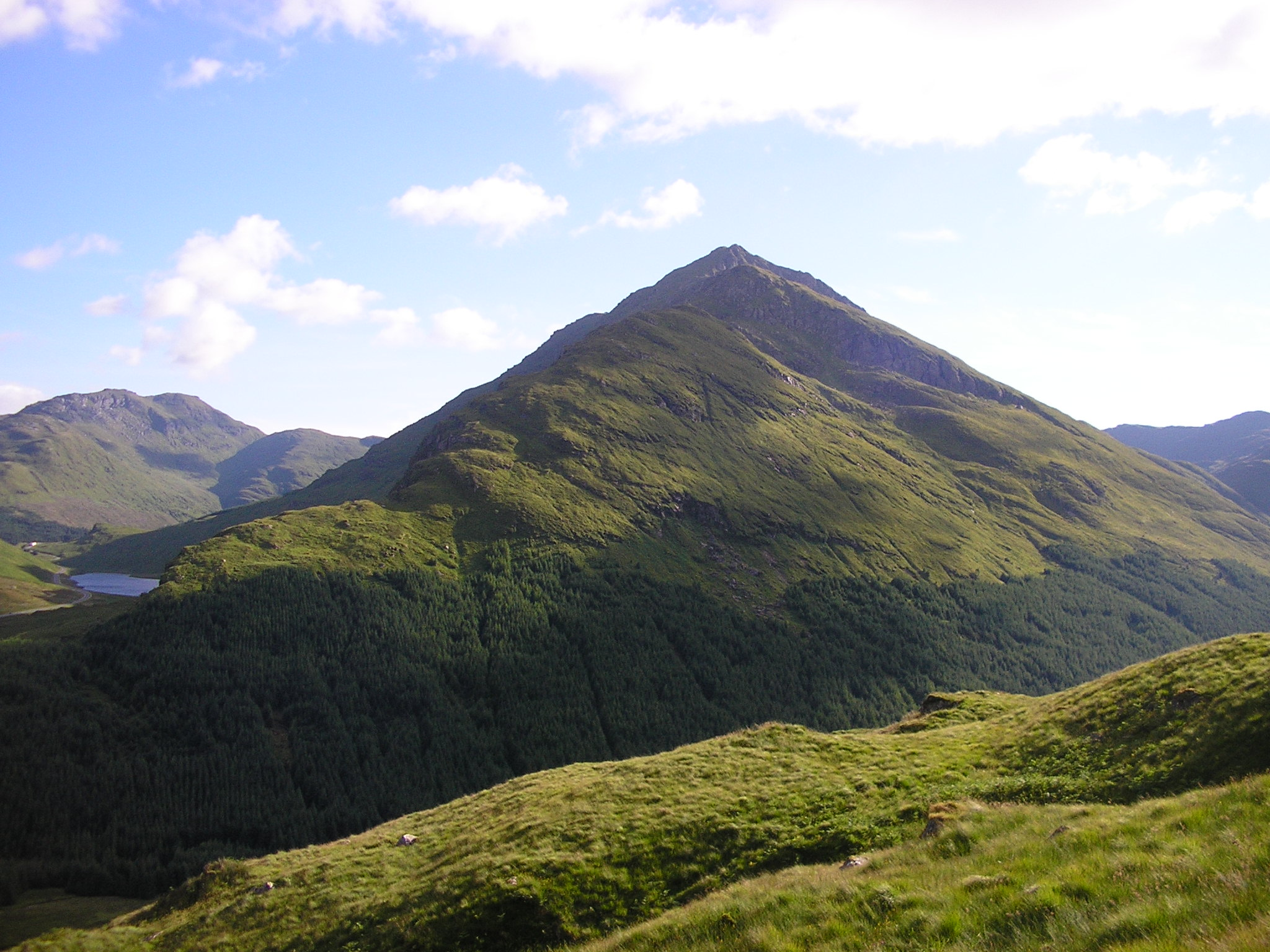
- Beinn an Lochain, seen whilst on the ascent of Stob Coire Creagach

Highest point
- Elevation: 901.7 metres (2,958 ft)
- Prominence: 640 metres (2,100 ft)
- Parent peak: Beinn Ime
- Listing: Corbett

Naming
- English translation: Mountain of the lochan (pond)
- Language of name: Scottish Gaelic
- Pronunciation: /ˌbeɪn ən ˈloʊxən/ BAYN ən LOH-khən; Scottish Gaelic: [ˈpeiɲ ən̪ˠ ˈl̪ˠɔxɛɲ]

Geography
- Location within Scotland
- Location: Cowal, Argyll and Bute, Scotland
- Parent range: Arrochar Alps, Grampian Range
- OS grid: NN 21800 07899
- Topo map: OS Landranger 56

Beinn an Lochain is a mountain in the Arrochar Alps in western Scotland. A Corbett, reaching 901.7 metres (2,958 ft), Beinn an Lochain is situated within the Argyll Forest Park, which is itself within the Loch Lomond and the Trossachs National Park.

Although included in Sir Hugh Munro's original list of Scottish mountains over 3,000 feet (914.4 metres) summit elevation, subsequent surveys showed it to be significantly shorter than this. Nonetheless, it remains a popular mountain, and is often quoted as an example of an interesting mountain below the Munro threshold to show that there is more to mountaineering in Scotland than just Munro-bagging.

Beinn an Lochain is usually climbed from the car park at Butter Bridge, on the A83, in Glen Kinglas. From there, the summit is reached after a 2.5-kilometre (1 1/2 mi) walk along the mountain's north-east ridge, climbing over 700 metres (2,300 ft). The mountain trail offers views of Loch Restil and the pass between Glen Croe and Glen Kinglas.

== See also ==
- List of Corbett mountains
