= List of Mountain Bothies Association bothies =

List of mountain shelters in UK

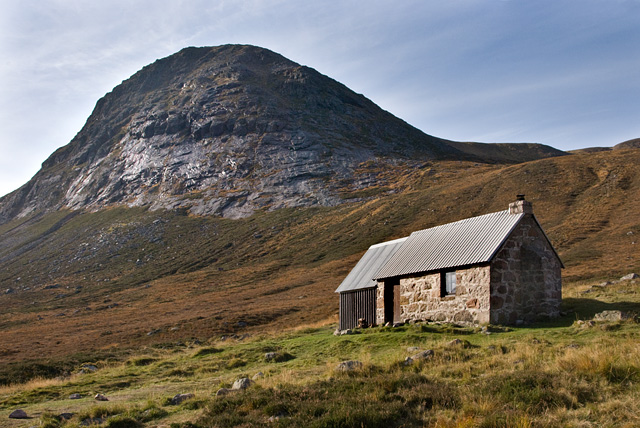
Corrour bothy in the Scottish Highlands

Bothies are remote, rural cottages that have outlived their original purposes but now are kept unlocked for people to take shelter or stay overnight without charge. They are located mostly in Scotland, with a small number in England and Wales, and have extremely basic facilities - with no electricity, gas, or piped water. The Mountain Bothies Association, established in 1965, is a charity that maintains bothies.

== Background ==
=== Bothies ===
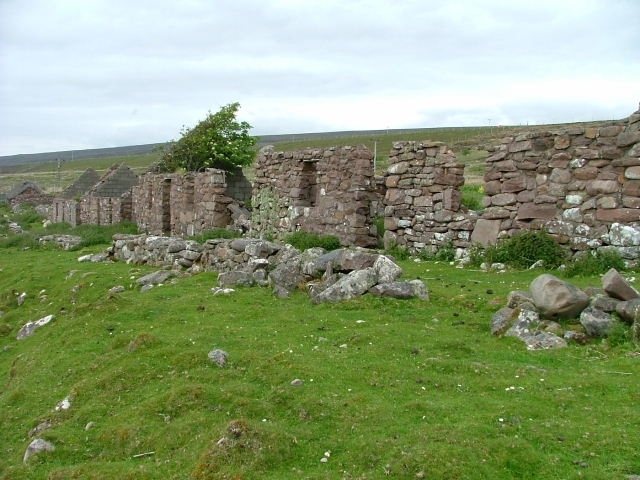
Lonbain deserted village, Applecross

Bothies are primitive shelters found primarily in Scotland (particularly in the Highlands) but also in remote parts of Wales and northern England. Highland Scotland has a low density of population by European standards, and in many remote areas the population has declined over the last 200 years due to emigration following the Highland Clearances and the Highland Potato Famine, together with migration to the cities because of industrialisation. In consequence, ruined but and ben cottages are often found abandoned in remote areas. Bothies were built for deer stalking (deer shooting), quarrying, cattle droving and shepherding but these have also fallen out of use.

The owners of these abandoned properties sometimes allow them be used freely by backpackers, climbers and the like – they are simply kept unlocked. There is no charge for use but neither are there any facilities – they have no electricity or piped water supply.

=== Mountain Bothies Association ===
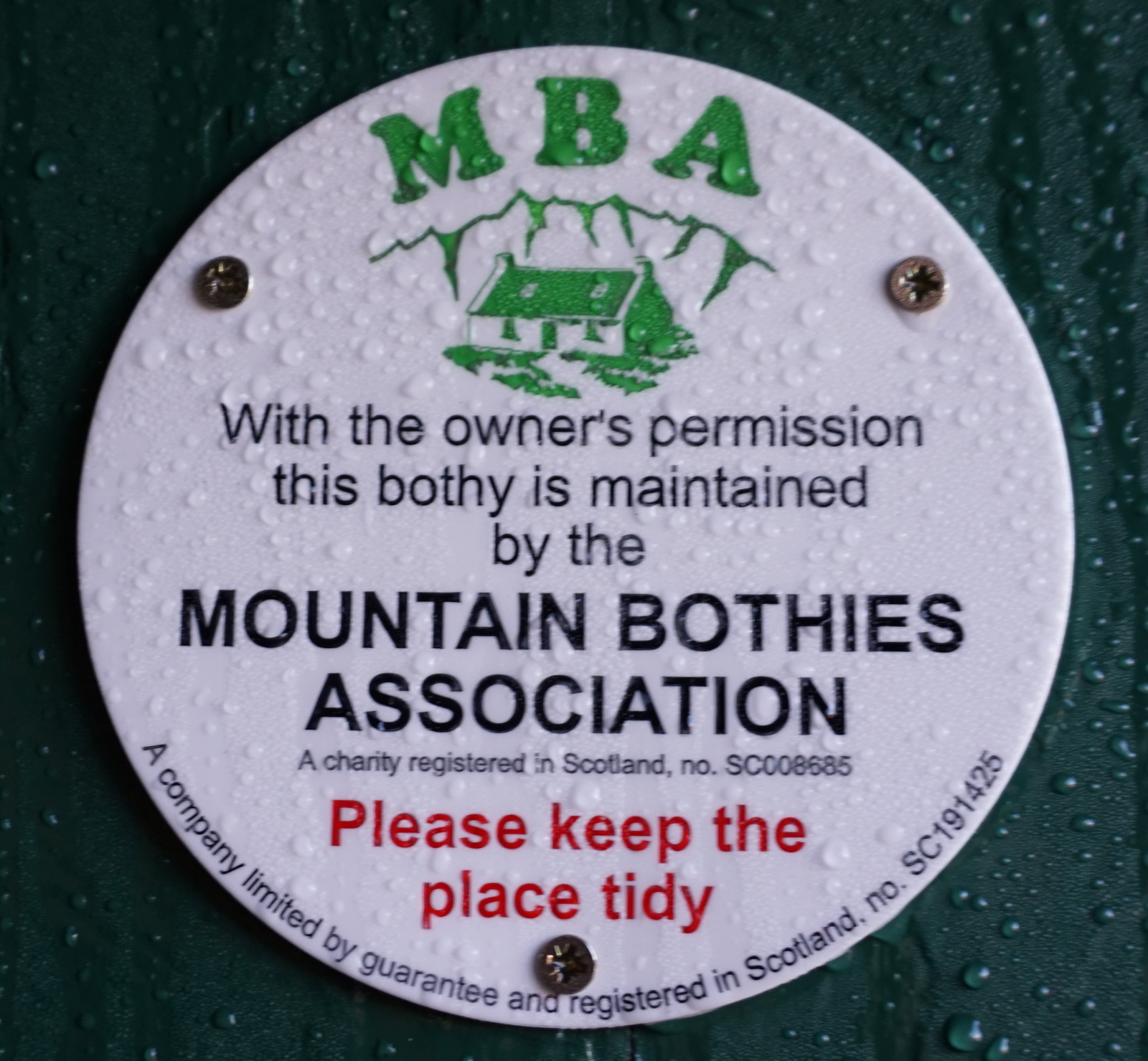
Notice on the door of Greg's Hut, Cross Fell

The Mountain Bothies Association was established in 1965, becoming a Scottish charity in 1975, to take on the basic care and maintenance of some of these shelters, with the cooperation of the owners who sometimes help financially. The first bothy to be restored was Tunskeen. The organisation has over ninety bothies, mostly in Scotland but with a few in England and Wales all of which may be stayed in without any charges at all. Very rarely is there vehicular access and, in some cases, even those located on the mainland are more directly accessible by boat.

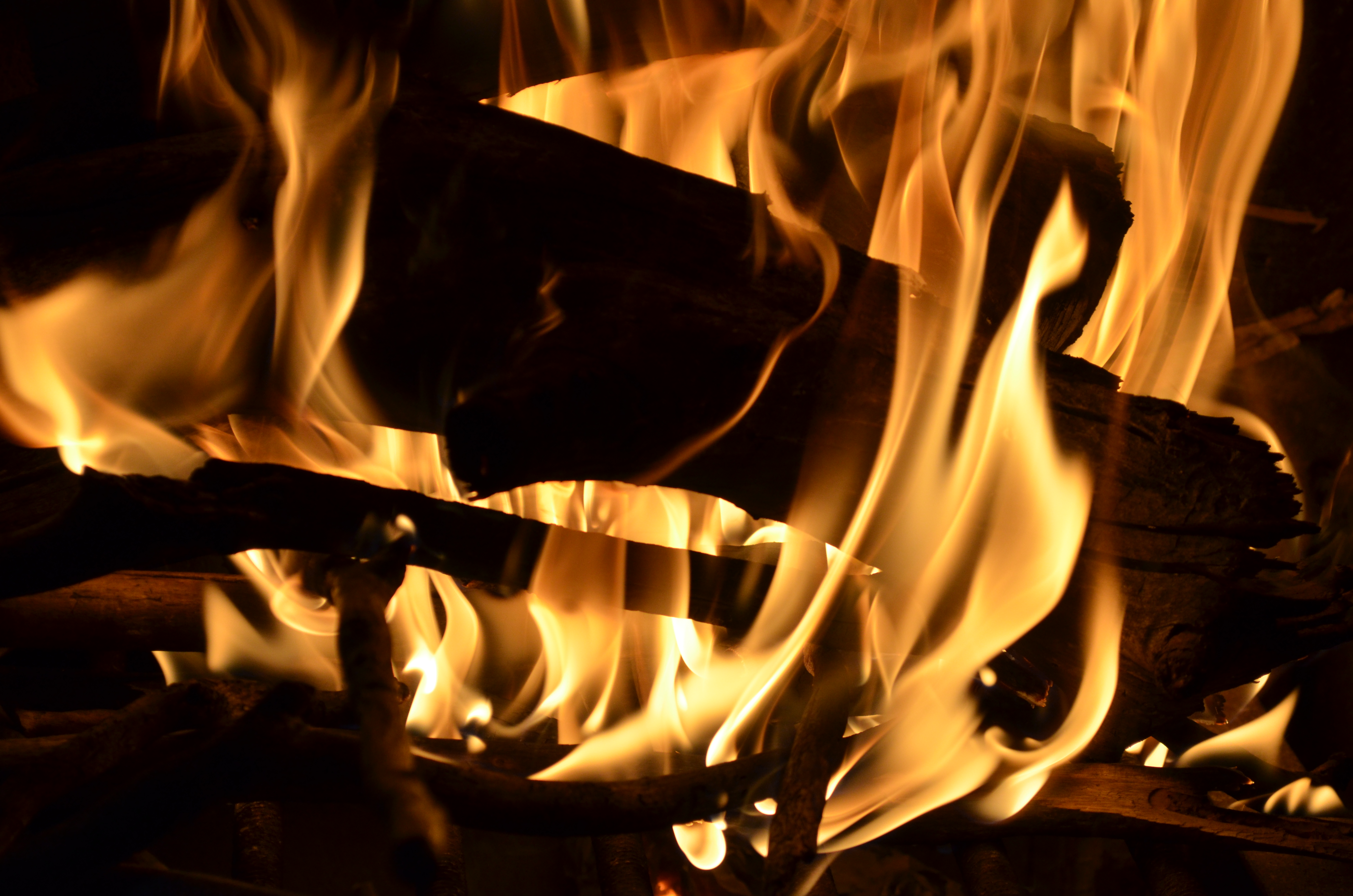
"Bothy TV"

The MBA aims to keep its properties windproof and waterproof so someone checks them a few times a year. At minimum there will be a table and a few chairs, and many bothies have a fireplace or stove although plenty do not. Fuel needs to be carried in (coal is best) – a blazing fire is known as "bothy TV". MBA bothies sometimes have an outside toilet but when this is not the case a toilet spade is provided. Raised platforms or bunks have been installed for sleeping – sometimes the floor, particularly an attic floor, is also suitable.

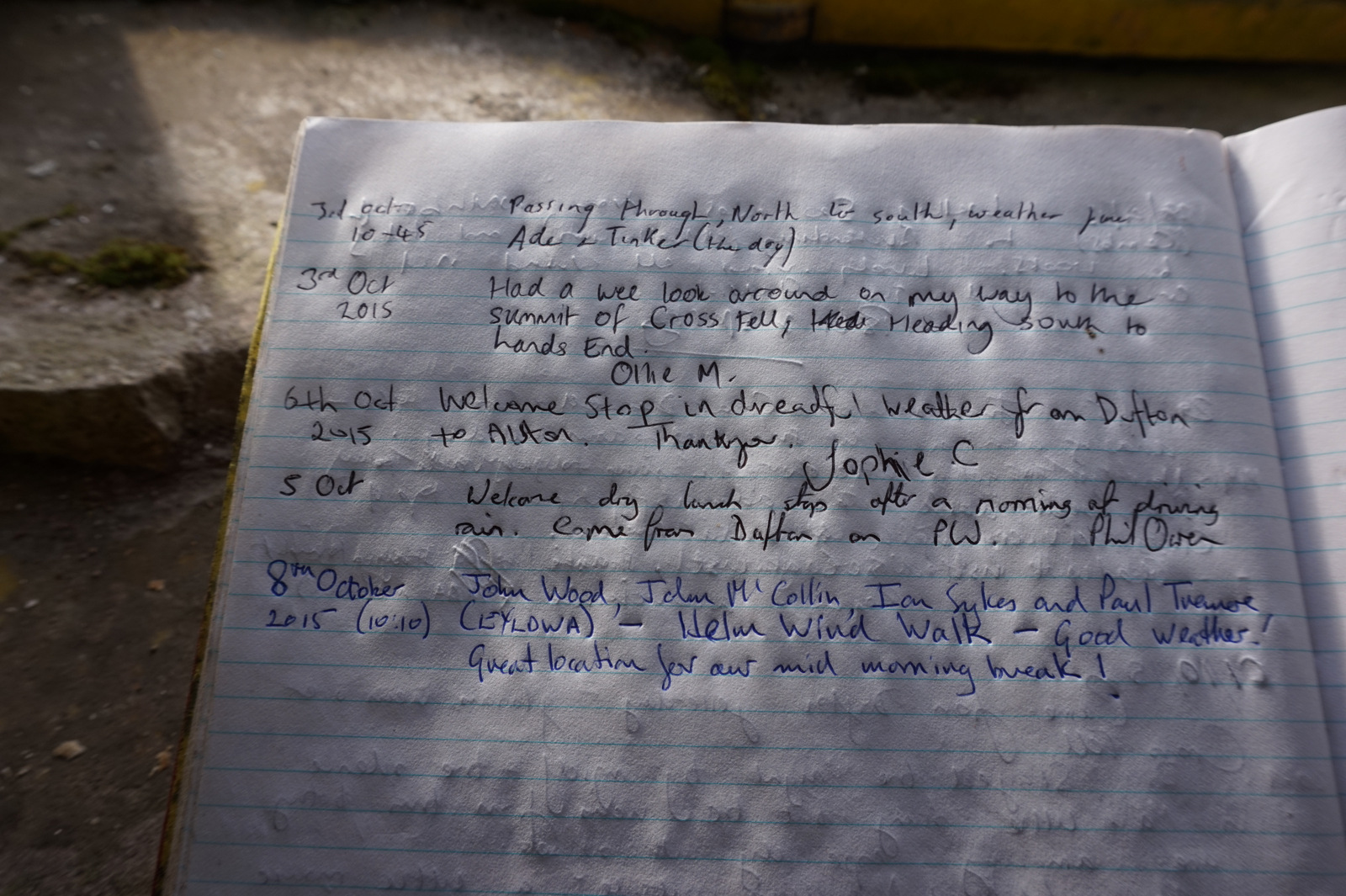
Bothy book at Greg's Hut (2015)

Visitors are expected to bring food and bedding with them. Sometimes there are books, cooking equipment and so forth left by previous visitors. A bothy book (visitors' book) is an important aspect of bothying culture. There is no system for reserving places or checking availability so, if the need arises, more people may squeeze in even if it means that some other people may decide to sleep outside in their tents. Visitors are only expected to stay for a short period – for a night or two – before moving on. Large groups – six or more – and commercial groups are not allowed.

=== Deer stalking in Scotland ===
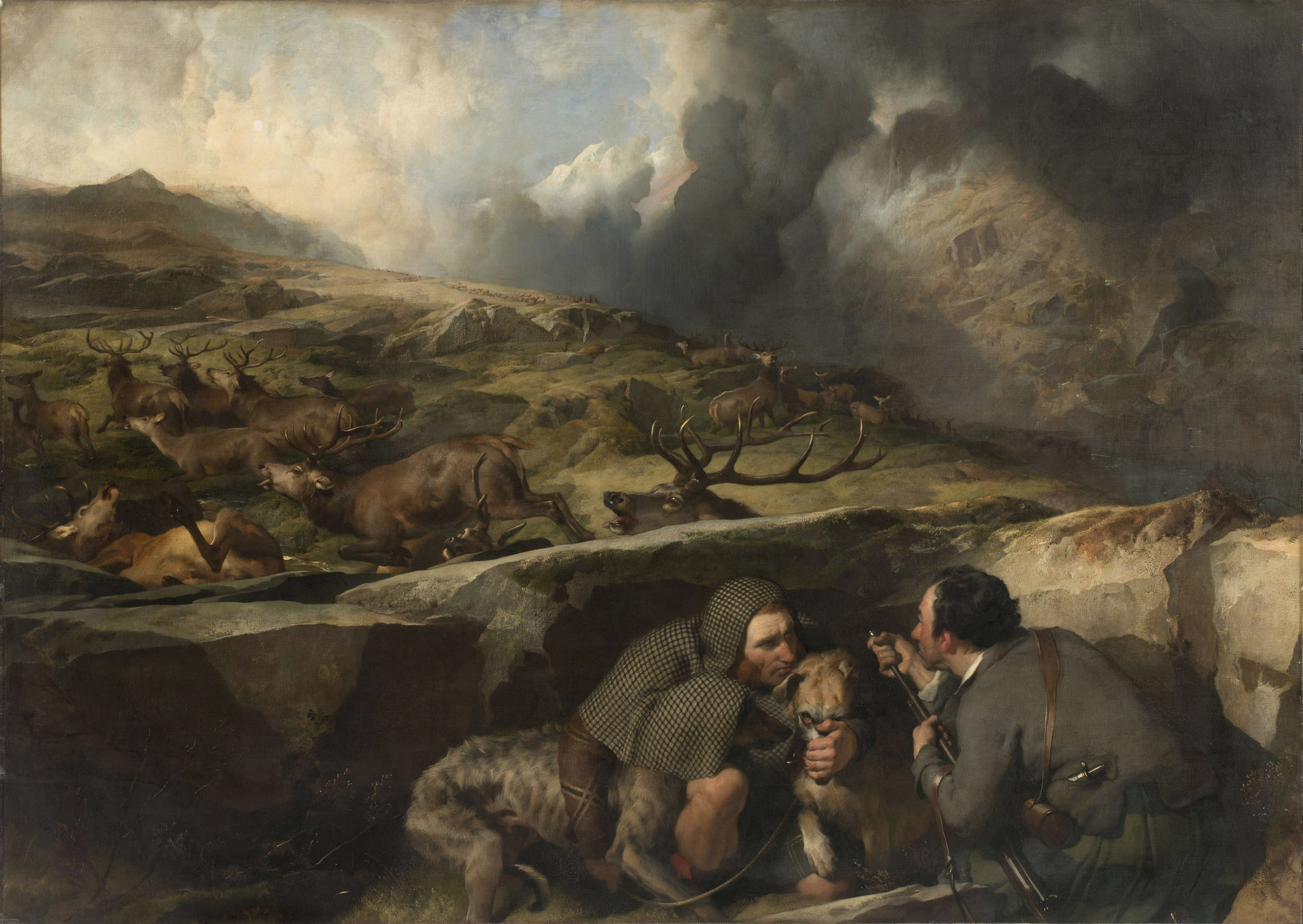
The Deer Drive, Landseer, 1847

In the Scottish Highlands many bothies are situated on deer stalking estates and so in the stalking season the land owner may restrict access or the bothy may be closed completely. Red deer stag hunting is from 1 July to 20 October (often starting 15 September) and this is the time of the greatest likelihood of restrictions. However, hind culling starts 21 October and can extend into February. Elsewhere, in sheep country, the shepherds themselves may need to use a bothy at lambing time and they take priority over visitors. Estates often ask visitors to telephone in advance to enquire about restrictions. Warning notices will be displayed and a website maintains up-to-date access arrangements throughout Scotland.

== List of MBA bothies ==
This sortable list includes all the Mountain Bothies Association bothies as of March 2025 as listed on their website. Traditionally these locations were not published but a change of policy in 2009 led to the locations being made openly available. In 2017 Geoff Allan published The Scottish Bothy Bible (referred to in the table as SBB), detailing all MBA bothies in Scotland as well as many other non-MBA bothies. Publication of this and other guides in recent years has led to controversy over the publicity of bothies and the 'bothy experience'. Some believe increased publicity in respect of bothies (as opposed to publicity of the maintenance work of the MBA) is detrimental to their long term sustainability. It has also been suggested that there should be a subcategory of bothies that are not publicised and are known only to MBA members, or alternatively, for no new bothies to be published beyond the MBA membership.

List of MBA bothies
MBA region (Note: The MBA region is as used on their website.)	Name	District	Grid ref Lat/long (Note: For locations in England and Wales the lat/long have been converted from the grid reference.)	Sleeps (Note: This is the number of places on sleeping platforms, bunks (or beds). Sometimes it is noted if floors are suitable (particularly upstairs on boards).)	Elevation (Note: For locations in England and Wales (and a few in Scotland as noted) the elevations have been read from the Ordnance Survey Explorer 1:25000 maps.)	Estate	Photo	Notes
Northern Highlands	Achnanclach	Sutherland	NC630511; 58.427°N 4.346°W	many	148 m (486 ft)	Syre		MBA SBB, 43.
Northern Highlands	Coiremor, Magoo's Bothy	Ross-shire	NH305888; 57.857°N 4.858°W	many	318 m (1,043 ft)	Corriemulzie		MBA SBB, 45.
Northern Highlands	Croft House, Lochstrathy	Sutherland	NC793490; 58.412°N 4.067°W	many	160 m (525 ft)	Strathy South		MBA SBB, 61.
Northern Highlands	Glencoul	Sutherland	NC270303; 58.228°N 4.947°W	4	11 m (36 ft)	Reay Forest		Best approached by water. MBA SBB, 49; also.
Northern Highlands	Glendhu	Sutherland	NC283337; 58.259°N 4.928°W	0+ upstairs	25 m (82 ft)	Reay Forest		MBA SBB, 53.
Northern Highlands	Kearvaig	Sutherland	NC292727; 58.609°N 4.941°W	2+ attic	9 m (30 ft)	Cape Wrath (MoD)		MBA SBB, 55.
Northern Highlands	Knockdamph	Sutherland	NH285953; 57.915°N 4.895°W	many	233 m (764 ft)	East Rhidorroch		MBA SBB, 59.
Northern Highlands	Schoolhouse, Duag Bridge	Sutherland	NH340975; 57.935°N 4.805°W	5	99 m (325 ft)	Corriemulzie		MBA SBB, 77;. also.
Northern Highlands	Shenavall	Wester Ross	NH066810; 57.777°N 5.254°W	many	128 m (420 ft)	Gruinard		Busy. MBA SBB, 63; also.
Northern Highlands	Strabeg	Sutherland	NC391518; 58.425°N 4.756°W	many	35 m (115 ft)	Eriboll		Easy access. MBA SBB, 67.
Northern Highlands	Strathan	Sutherland	NC247612; 58.503°N 5.010°W	2+	62 m (203 ft)	Keoldale		Near Sandwood Bay. MBA 15; SBB, 69.
Northern Highlands	Strathchailleach	Sutherland	NC249658; 58.545°N 5.010°W	2	95 m (312 ft)	Keoldale		Near Sandwood Bay. MBA SBB, 71; also.
Northern Highlands	Suileag	Sutherland	NC149212; 58.140°N 5.145°W	8	137 m (449 ft)	Glencanisp		MBA SBB, 75.
North West Highlands and Islands	Bearnais	Wester Ross	NH021431; 57.434°N 5.298°W	2	279 m (915 ft)	Attadale		MBA SBB, 85.
North West Highlands and Islands	Camasunary (new)	Skye	NG517183; 57.190°N 6.112°W	16	5 m (16 ft)	Camasunary		New bothy. (Note: This Camasunary bothy is a new replacement bothy at the eastern side of loch head. The previous one is no longer available.); MBA SBB, 285.
North West Highlands and Islands	Camban	Kintail	NH053184; 57.214°N 5.225°W	many	279 m (915 ft)	West Affric (NTS)		MBA SBB, 89.
North West Highlands and Islands	Coire Fionnaraich	Wester Ross	NG950480; 57.476°N 5.421°W	many	180 m (591 ft)	Fionnaraich		MBA SBB, 93.
North West Highlands and Islands	Craig	Wester Ross	NG774639; 57.610°N 5.727°W	many	83 m (272 ft)	SYHA		MBA SBB, 95; also.
North West Highlands and Islands	Easan Dorcha (The Teahouse)	Wester Ross	NH012526; 57.519°N 5.323°W	0 (Note: Easan Dorcha is very small, only three can just about lie on the floor.)	215 m (705 ft)	Coulin		MBA SBB, 103; also.
North West Highlands and Islands	Lookout (Rubha Hunish)	Skye	NG412763; 57.701°N 6.344°W	3+ 4 floor	82 m (269 ft)	MBA		Ex-coastguard station, hence excellent views. MBA SBB, 293; also.
North West Highlands and Islands	Maol Bhuidhe	Wester Ross	NH053360; 57.372°N 5.241°W	many in attic	261 m (856 ft)	Killilan		MBA SBB, 97.
North West Highlands and Islands	Ollisdal	Skye	NG213394; 57.360°N 6.636°W	small	89 m (292 ft)	Glendale		Interior photo. MBA SBB, 287.
North West Highlands and Islands	Taigh Thormoid Dhuibh (Raasay)	Skye	NG612524; 57.499°N 5.988°W	6	15 m (49 ft)	Raasay		Island of Raasay, interior photos. MBA SBB, 291.
North West Highlands and Islands	Uags	Applecross	NG723351; 57.349°N 5.787°W	1+ attic	23 m (75 ft)	Applecross		MBA SBB, 105.
North West Highlands and Islands	Uisinis	Outer Hebrides	NF849332; 57.280°N 7.231°W	4	24 m (79 ft)	South Uist		Island of South Uist. MBA SBB, 297.
Western Highlands	A' Chuil	Lochaber	NM944924; 56.977°N 5.384°W	7 (Note: In Allan, text and strapline differ. Text followed, as per blog.)	137 m (449 ft)	Glendessary		Busy but rarely full. MBA SBB, 111.
Western Highlands	Dibidil	Rùm	NM393928; 56.952°N 6.289°W	6	29 m (95 ft)	Scottish Natural Heritage		Interior photo. MBA SBB, 275.
Western Highlands	Gleann Dubh-lighe	Lochaber	NM945820; 56.884°N 5.375°W	2+	128 m (420 ft)	Fassfern		MBA SBB, 117.
Western Highlands	Glenpean	Lochaber	NM936904; 56.958°N 5.396°W	2+ large attic	106 m (348 ft)	Glendessary		MBA SBB, 119.
Western Highlands	Guirdil	Rùm	NG320014; 57.025°N 6.418°W	4+	21 m (69 ft)	Scottish Natural Heritage		Island of Rùm. MBA SBB, 281.
Western Highlands	Invermallie	Lochaber	NN136888; 56.953°N 5.067°W	4+ large attic	45 m (148 ft)	Locheil		Busy. MBA SBB, 123.
Western Highlands	Kinbreack	Lochaber	NN002961; 57.013°N 5.292°W	0+ small attic	182 m (597 ft) (Note: Kinbreack elevation corrected to OS map. Allan quotes 370 metres.)	Locheil		Interior photo. MBA SBB, 125.
Western Highlands	Oban	Lochaber	NM863901; 56.952°N 5.515°W	many	11 m (36 ft)	Meoble		MBA SBB, 129.
Western Highlands	Sourlies	Lochaber	NM868951; 56.997°N 5.513°W	8	24 m (79 ft)	Camusrory		Busy in summer. MBA SBB, 135.
Western Highlands	Suardalan	Lochaber	NG883173; 57.197°N 5.506°W	9	113 m (371 ft)	Glenelg Grazing		MBA SBB, 101.
Southwest Highlands and Islands	Abyssinia	Loch Lomond; Glen Kinglas	NN256117; 56.266°N 4.818°W	8	250 m (820 ft) (Note: Elevation read from OS map.)	Strone		MBA also.
Southwest Highlands and Islands	Cadderlie	North Argyll	NN047370; 56.486°N 5.175°W	4	14 m (46 ft)	Loch Etive		MBA SBB, 207.
Southwest Highlands and Islands	Carron	Knapdale	NR944996; 56.145°N 5.311°W	2+ floor	188 m (617 ft)	Ederline		MBA SBB, 211.
Southwest Highlands and Islands	Cruib	Jura	NR567829; 55.977°N 5.902°W	5	2 m (7 ft)	Ruantallaine		Island of Jura. MBA SBB, 273.
Southwest Highlands and Islands	Doune Byre	Loch Lomond	NN332144; 56.293°N 4.696°W	4	71 m (233 ft)	Glenfalloch		West Highland Way. MBA SBB, 215p.
Southwest Highlands and Islands	Druimnashallog	Lorne	NM898164; 56.294°N 5.396°W	0 (Note: Closed - under renovation)	160 m (525 ft)	Forestry and Land Scotland		MBA
Southwest Highlands and Islands	Essan	Wester Ross	NM817817; 56.875°N 5.584°W	12	34 m (112 ft)	Inverailort		MBA SBB, 115.
Southwest Highlands and Islands	Glengarrisdale	Jura	NR644970; 56.107°N 5.790°W	4	7 m (23 ft)	Ardlussa		Island of Jura. MBA SBB, 279.
Southwest Highlands and Islands	Leacraithnaich	Ardgour	NM742472; 56.562°N 5.676°W	4	148 m (486 ft)	Ardtornish		MBA SBB, 221.
Southwest Highlands and Islands	Mark Cottage	Loch Lomond	NS229952; 56.116°N 4.849°W	6	9 m (30 ft)	Forestry Commission		MBA SBB, 223.
Southwest Highlands and Islands	Resourie	Ardgour	NM861710; 56.781°N 5.502°W	10	139 m (456 ft)	Glenhurich Forest		MBA SBB, 225.
Southwest Highlands and Islands	Rowchoish	Loch Lomond	NN336043; 56.202°N 4.684°W	12	41 m (135 ft)	East Lomond Forest		West Highland Way. MBA SBB, 227.
Southwest Highlands and Islands	Taigh Seumas a' Ghlinne, Glen Duror	Lochaber	NN022539; 56.635°N 5.227°W	4	203 m (666 ft)	Lorne Forest		MBA SBB, 217; also.
Southwest Highlands and Islands	Tomsleibhe	Mull	NM617372; 56.466°N 5.869°W	10	94 m (308 ft) (Note: Tomsleibhe elevation corrected to OS map. Allan quotes 2 metres.)	Glen Forsa		Isle of Mull. MBA SBB, 295.
Central Highlands	Achadh-nan-darach	Fort Augustus	NH313057; 57.112°N 4.787°W	many	140 m (459 ft)	Aberchalder		MBA
Central Highlands	Ben Alder Cottage	Rannoch	NN499680; 56.779°N 4.459°W	4	373 m (1,224 ft)	Ben Alder		MBA SBB, 143.
Central Highlands	Blackburn of Corrieyairack	Monadhliath	NH382029; 57.088°N 4.672°W	0+ 8 floor	344 m (1,129 ft)	Culachy		MBA SBB, 147; also.
Central Highlands	Culra	-	NN523762; 56.854°N 4.424°W	0 (Note: Because of asbestos, Culra bothy has been demolished but it is intended to rebuild it – Ben Alder bothy is about 7 miles south.)	457 m (1,499 ft)	Ben Alder		Demolished prior to rebuild. MBA SBB, 144.
Central Highlands	Glenbuck	Monadhliath	NN336996; 57.057°N 4.746°W	many	283 m (928 ft)	Aberchalder		MBA SBB, 149; also.
Central Highlands	Gorton	Rannoch	NN375481; 56.597°N 4.649°W	0+ floor	299 m (981 ft)	Blackmount		MBA SBB, 219.
Central Highlands	Lairig Leacach	Lochaber	NN282738; 56.823°N 4.816°W	8	467 m (1,532 ft)	Killiechonate and Mamores		Busy. MBA SBB, 151; also.
Central Highlands	Loch Chiarain	Lochaber	NN289634; 56.731°N 4.798°W	1+ large attic	370 m (1,214 ft)	Killiechonate and Mamores		MBA SBB, 153.
Central Highlands	Luib Chonnal	Monadhliath	NN394936; 57.006°N 4.646°W	0+ attic	331 m (1,086 ft)	Braeroy		MBA SBB, 155.
Central Highlands	Meanach	Lochaber	NN266685; 56.775°N 4.839°W	3	345 m (1,132 ft)	Killiechonate and Mamores		MBA SBB, 157.
Central Highlands	Staoineag	Lochaber	NN296678; 56.771°N 4.791°W	many	293 m (961 ft)	Killiechonate and Mamores		MBA SBB, 161.
Eastern Highlands	Allt Scheicheachan	Badenoch	NN835737; 56.840°N 3.912°W	2+ attic	487 m (1,598 ft)	Atholl		Interior photo. Not at all busy. MBA SBB, 167.
Eastern Highlands	Callater Stable	Mounth	NO178845; 56.944°N 3.353°W	8	514 m (1,686 ft)	Invercauld		MBA SBB, 171.
Eastern Highlands	Charr	Mounth	NO616831; 56.938°N 2.633°W	3	264 m (866 ft)	Glendye		MBA SBB, 185.
Eastern Highlands	Corrour	Cairngorms	NN981958; 57.042°N 3.681°W	4	564 m (1,850 ft)	Mar Lodge (NTS)		Lairig Ghru. Often crowded. MBA SBB, 175.
Eastern Highlands	Faindouran	Cairngorms	NJ082062; 57.137°N 3.519°W	2+ attic	603 m (1,978 ft)	Inchrory		MBA SBB, 179.
Eastern Highlands	Fords of Avon Refuge Hut (Note: Emergency refuge hut only.)	Cairngorms	NJ042032; 57.110°N 3.584°W	0	689 m (2,260 ft)	Abernethy (RSPB)		Interior photo. MBA SBB, 201.
Eastern Highlands	Garbh Choire Refuge	Cairngorms	NN959986; 57.067°N 3.718°W	0	710 m (2,329 ft)	Mar Lodge (NTS)		MBA also.
Eastern Highlands	Gelder Shiel Stable	Mounth	NO258900; 56.995°N 3.224°W	6	444 m (1,457 ft)	Balmoral		MBA SBB, 181; also.
Eastern Highlands	Glas Allt Shiel Bothy	Loch Muick	NO276824; 56.927°N 3.191°W	6 in attic	400 m (1,312 ft)	Balmoral Estate		MBA SBB, 183.
Eastern Highlands	Hutchison Memorial Hut	Cairngorms	NO023998; 57.078°N 3.613°W	2+ 4 floor	747 m (2,451 ft)	Mar Lodge (NTS)		Interior photo. MBA SBB, 187; also.
Eastern Highlands	Ruigh Aiteachain	Cairngorms	NN847928; 57.012°N 3.900°W	10+ attic	389 m (1,276 ft)	Glenfeshie		MBA SBB, 189; also.
Eastern Highlands	Ruighe Ealasaid (Red House)	Cairngorms	NO003869; 56.962°N 3.643°W		439 m (1,440 ft)	Mar Lodge		MBA (Note: MBA 2019–2020 project, not presently maintained open shelter.) also.
Eastern Highlands	Ryvoan	Cairngorms	NJ006115; 57.184°N 3.646°W	4	394 m (1,293 ft)	Abernethy (RSPB)		RSPB nature reserve. MBA SBB, 193; also.
Eastern Highlands	Shielin of Mark	Mounth	NO337827; 56.930°N 3.092°W	2	644 m (2,113 ft)	Dalhousie		MBA SBB, 195.
Eastern Highlands	Tarf Hotel (Feith Uaine)	Badenoch	NN927789; 56.889°N 3.763°W	7	566 m (1,857 ft)	Atholl		Remote. MBA SBB, 197.
Southern Scotland	Brattleburn	Lowther Hills	NT016069; 55.346°N 3.554°W	2+ attic	275 m (902 ft)	-		MBA SBB, 239.
Southern Scotland	Burleywhag	Lowther Hills	NS971001; 55.284°N 3.622°W	2	360 m (1,181 ft)	Queensberry		MBA SBB, 241.
Southern Scotland	Clennoch	Galloway	NS603002; 55.276°N 4.201°W	6	416 m (1,365 ft)	Moorbrock		MBA SBB, 243.
Southern Scotland	Dryfehead	Dumfriesshire	NY170999; 55.286°N 3.308°W	6	310 m (1,017 ft)	Tanlawhill Farm, Tilhill Forestry		Bothy restored since photo taken. MBA SBB, 247.
Southern Scotland	Gameshope	Dumfriesshire	NT135185; 55.453°N 3.371°W	8	419 m (1,375 ft)	Borders Forest		MBA SBB, 249.
Southern Scotland	Greensykes	Dumfriesshire	NT312000; 55.290°N 3.084°W	8	268 m (879 ft)	Greensykes		MBA SBB, 251.
Southern Scotland	Kettleton Byre	Lowther Hills	NS912021; 55.301°N 3.716°W	4	356 m (1,168 ft)	Queensberry		MBA SBB, 253; also.
Southern Scotland	Leysburnfoot (Will's Bothy)	Liddesdale	NY536976; 55.272°N 2.732°W		250 m (820 ft)	-		MBA
Southern Scotland	Over Phawhope	Dumfriesshire	NT183082; 55.361°N 3.293°W	8	395 m (1,296 ft)	MBA		MBA SBB, 255.
Southern Scotland	Tunskeen	Galloway	NX425906; 55.184°N 4.476°W	6	324 m (1,063 ft)	Galloway Forest		MBA SBB, 257; also.
Southern Scotland	White Laggan	Galloway	NX466775; 55.068°N 4.403°W	6	264 m (866 ft)	Galloway Forest		MBA SBB, 259.
Northern England and Borders	Cross Fell (Greg's Hut)	North Pennines	NY690355; 54.713°N 2.481°W	6–10	690 m (2,264 ft)	-		Mining subsidence nearby. MBA also.
Northern England and Borders	Dubs Hut	Lake District	NY209134; 54.510°N 3.223°W		480 m (1,575 ft)	-		MBA.
Northern England and Borders	Flittingford	Kielder	NY754886; 55.192°N 2.387°W	4	281 m (922 ft)	Forest Enterprise England		MBA also.
Northern England and Borders	Great Lingy Hut	Lake District	NY312337; 54.694°N 3.068°W	3–4	600 m (1,969 ft)	Lake District National Park		MBA also.
Northern England and Borders	Green	Kielder	NY740786; 55.101°N 2.409°W		272 m (892 ft)	-		MBA. Closed until further notice
Northern England and Borders	Haughtongreen	Kielder	NY788713; 55.035°N 2.333°W		248 m (814 ft)	-		MBA .
Northern England and Borders	Kershopehead	North Pennines	NY544863; 55.169°N 2.717°W	2+ 10 floor	248 m (814 ft)	-		MBA also.
Northern England and Borders	Mosedale Cottage	Lake District	NY495095; 54.478°N 2.781°W	12+ floor	450 m (1,476 ft)	-		Interior photo. MBA; also.
Northern England and Borders	Roughside	Kielder	NY745833; 55.143°N 2.401°W		220 m (722 ft)	-		MBA.
Northern England and Borders	Spithope	Cheviots	NT769057; 55.344°N 2.367°W		340 m (1,115 ft)	-		MBA.
Northern England and Borders	Wainhope	Kielder	NY671925; 55.226°N 2.519°W		270 m (886 ft)	-		MBA.
Northern England and Borders	Warnscale Head	Lake District	NY206132; 54.508°N 3.228°W	0 (Note: MBA says Warnscale Head is not suitable for overnight stays, Smith says 2 on platform + 2 on floor.)	460 m (1,509 ft)	-		MBA; also.
Wales	Arenig Fawr	Snowdonia	SH851380; 52.929°N 3.712°W	3	400 m (1,312 ft)	Welsh Water		MBA also.
Wales	Cae Amos	Snowdonia	SH517454; 52.986°N 4.211°W		216 m (709 ft)	-		MBA, also.
Wales	Dulyn	Snowdonia	SH705664; 53.179°N 3.939°W	0+ 10 floor	510 m (1,673 ft)	-		MBA also.
Wales	Grwyne Fawr	Black Mountains	SO225312; 51.974°N 3.129°W	4	552 m (1,811 ft)	-		MBA also.
Wales	Lluest Cwm Bach	Cambrian Mountains	SN900705; 52.321°N 3.614°W	6–7	350 m (1,148 ft)	Elan Valley Trust		MBA, also.
Wales	Moel Prysgau	Cambrian Mountains	SN806611; 52.235°N 3.750°W	many	378 m (1,240 ft)	Natural Resources Wales		MBA also.
Wales	Nant Rhys	Cambrian Mountains	SN836792; 52.399°N 3.711°W		466 m (1,529 ft)	-		MBA also.
Wales	Nant Syddion	Cambrian Mountains	SN773791; 52.396°N 3.804°W	18+	310 m (1,017 ft)	Forest Enterprise Ceredigion Area		MBA also.
Wales	Penrhos Isaf	Snowdonia	SH737238; 52.798°N 3.874°W		169 m (554 ft)	-		MBA, also.

== Maps ==
The locations of all the bothies listed in this article are available for mapping purposes.

== Gallery of interior photographs ==
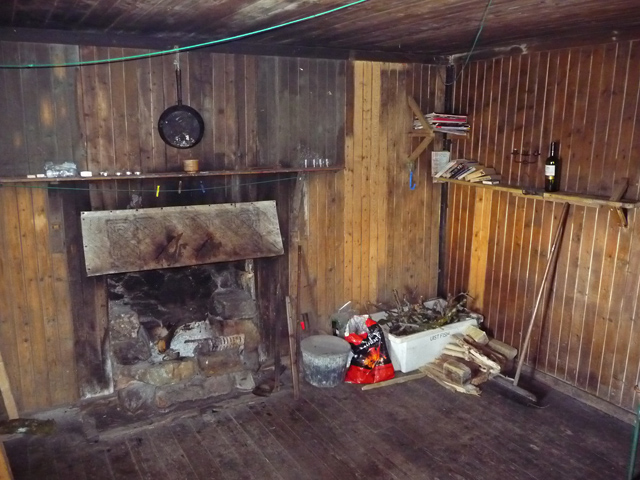
Ollisdal (2013)

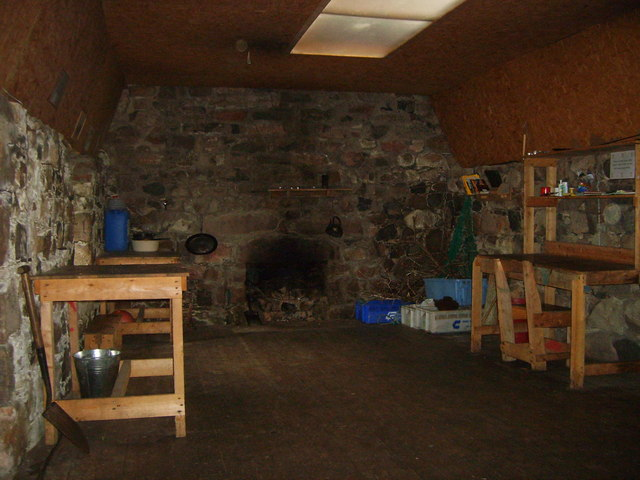
Taigh Thormoid Dhuibh (2008)

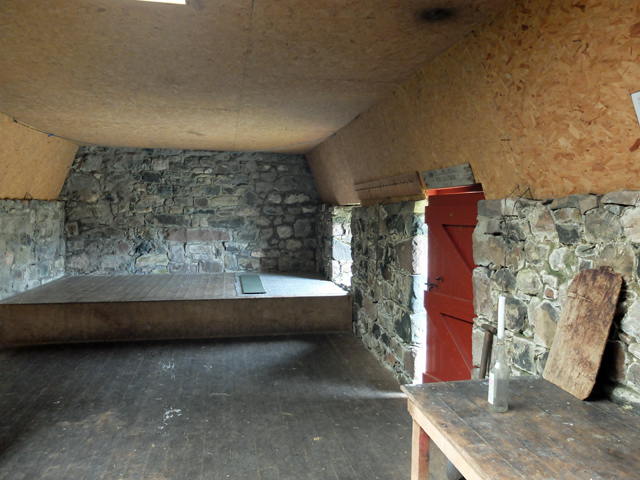
Taigh Thormoid Dhuibh (2014)

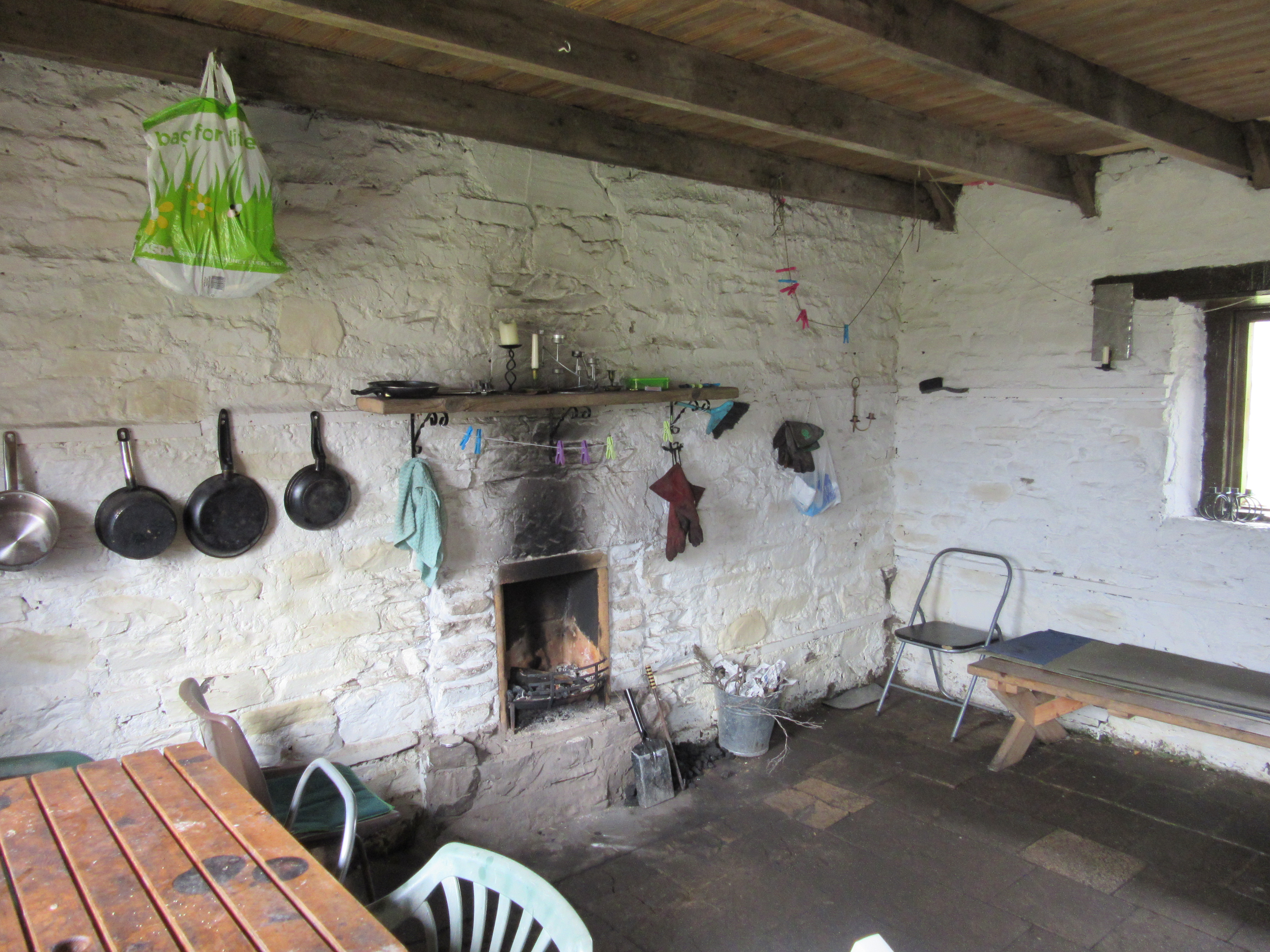
Allt Scheicheachan (2015)

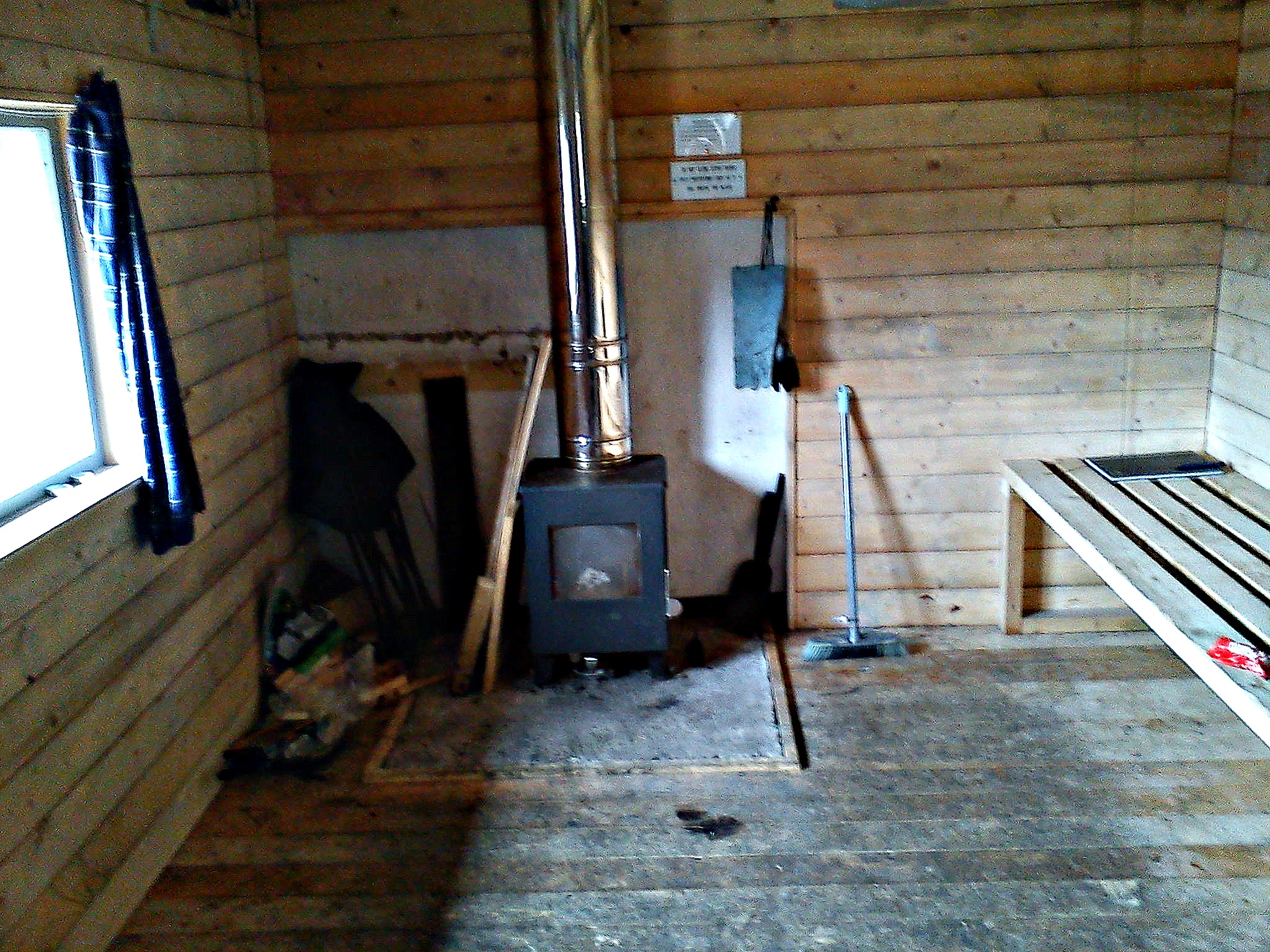
Hutchison Memorial Hut (2012)

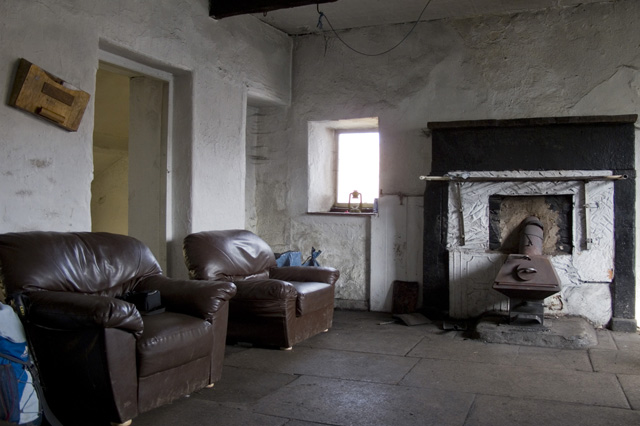
Mosedale Cottage (2011)

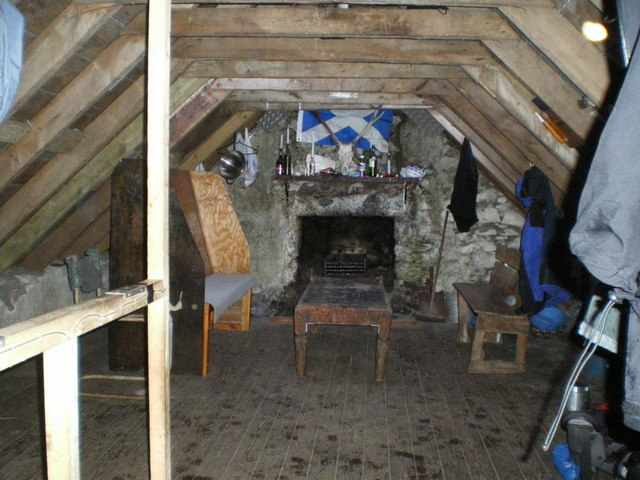
Kinbreack (2009)

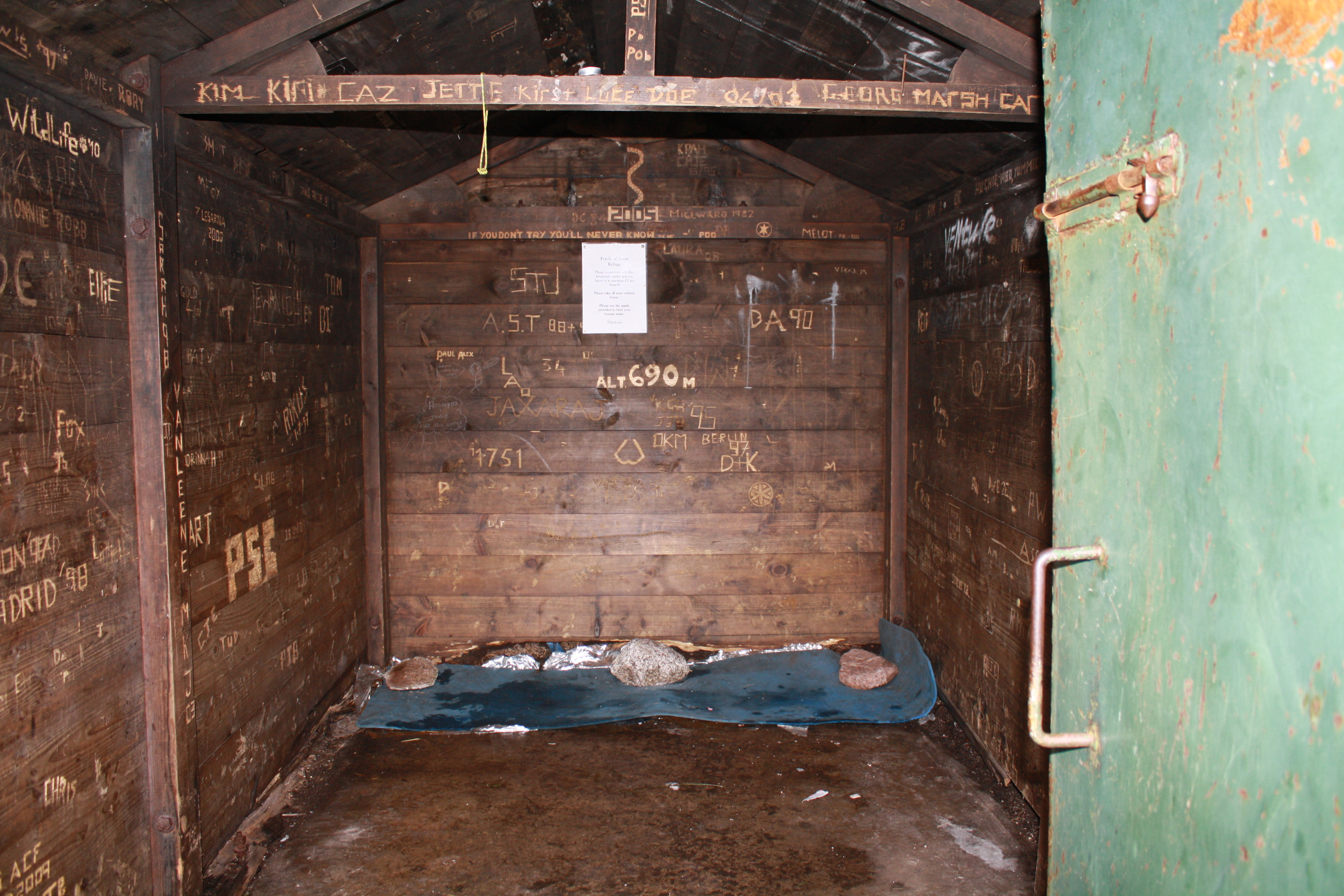
Fords of Avon Refuge (2010)

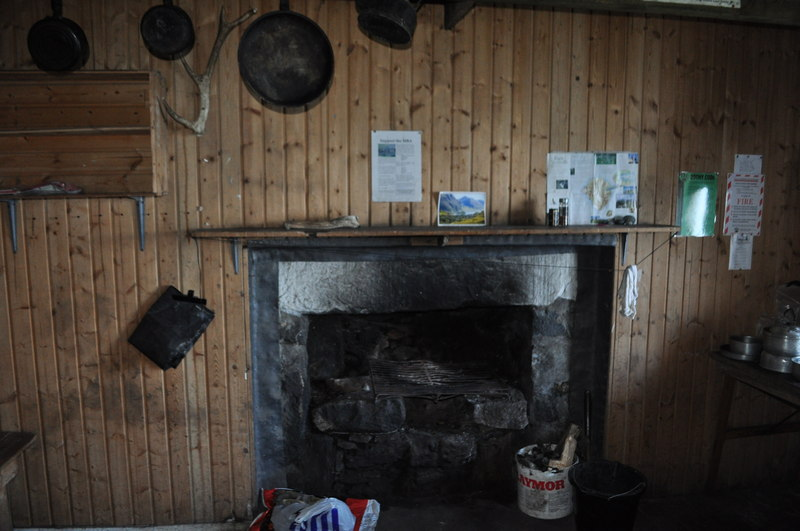
Dibidil (2011)

== Further reading and external links ==
- http://www.mountainbothies.org.uk – MBA website.
- https://bothiesonabike.wordpress.com – "Bothies on a bike", Geoff Allan's blog while he was researching The Scottish Bothy Bible.
- Brocklehurst, Steven (12 March 2017). "Bothy-bagging: Scotland's best-kept secrets revealed". BBC News.
- Brown, Dave; Mitchell, Ian R (1987). Mountain Days and Bothy Nights. Luath Press Limited. ISBN 9781906307837.
- Turnbull, Ronald (2001). The Book of the Bivvy. Cicerone. ISBN 978-1852845612.
- Watson, Adam (2011). It's a Fine day for the Hill : and once in a blue sun and moon : hills, folk and wildlife, 1935–62. Paragon Publishing. ISBN 9781907611582.
