= Binnein an Fhidhleir =

- (Stob Coire Creagach)
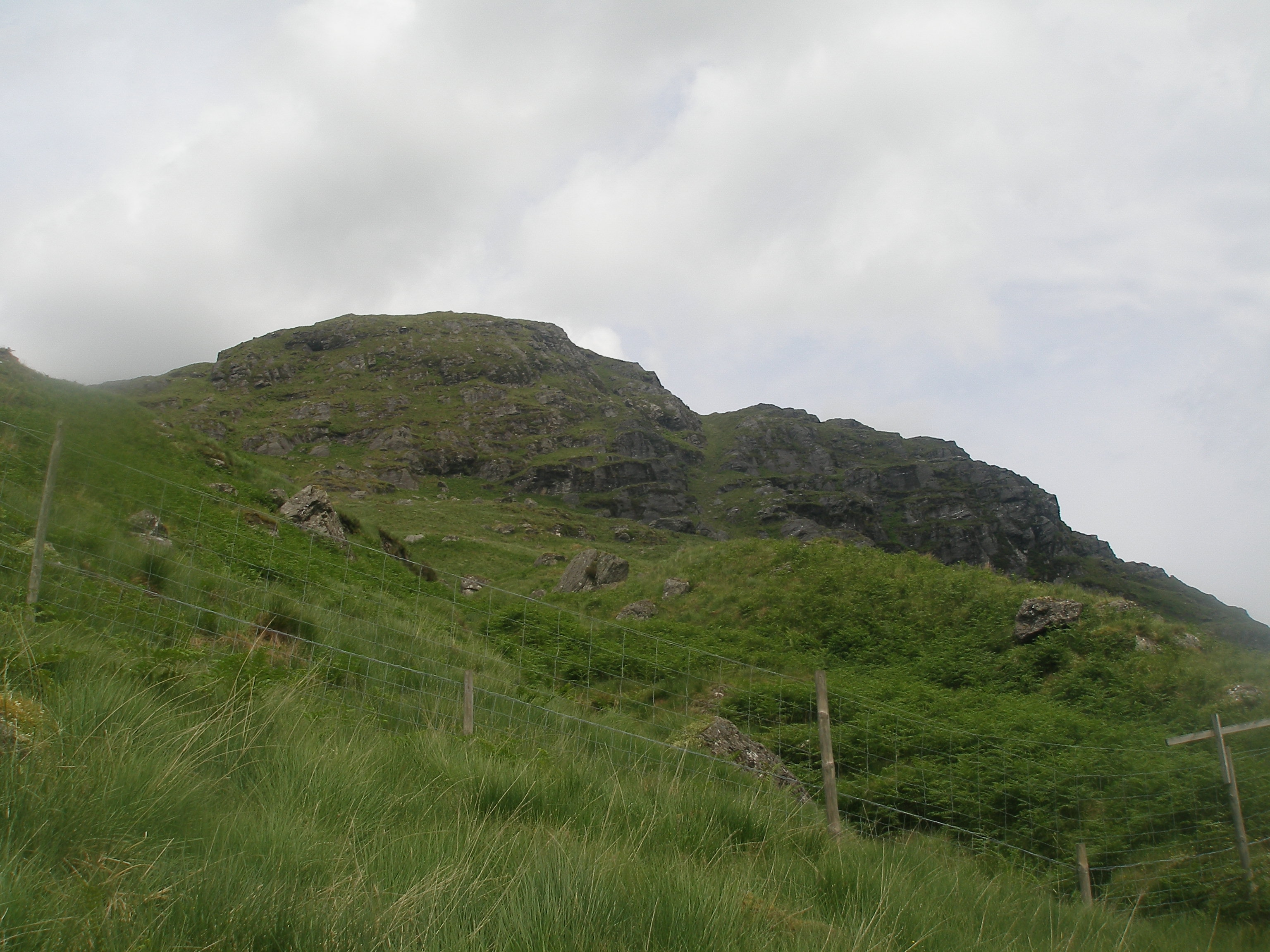
- Binnein an Fhidhleir (Stob Coire Creagach top) seen from Butter Bridge

Highest point
- Elevation: 817.8 metres (2,683 ft)
- Prominence: 505 metres (1,657 ft)
- Parent peak: Beinn Ime
- Listing: Corbett, Marilyn
- Coordinates: 56°15′27″N 4°51′32″W

Naming
- English translation: The fiddler's peak (Peak of the rocky corrie)
- Language of name: Scottish Gaelic
- Pronunciation: Scottish Gaelic: [ˈpiɲɛɲ ən̪ˠ ˈiʝlɛrˠ]

Geography
- Location within Scotland
- Location: Argyll and Bute, Scotland
- Parent range: Arrochar Alps, Grampian Range
- OS grid: NN 22999 10899
- Topo map: OS Landranger 56

Binnein an Fhidhleir, is one of the Arrochar Alps, a mountain in Argyll and Bute, western Scotland. Located in the Loch Lomond and The Trossachs National Park.

Located above the Butter Bridge, on the north side the A83 road, facing Beinn an Lochain to the south. The mountain has several tops, including; Creag Bhrosgan 770.3 metres (2,527 ft); Stob Coire Creagach, which replaced Binnein an Fhidhleir as the Marilyn in April 2006, at 817 metres (2,680 ft). Later 817.8 metres (2,683 ft) in August 2021. One without any name at all at 748 metres (2,454 ft). Binnein an Fhidhleir itself, further to the west at 811 metres (2,661 ft). Although Stob Coire Creagach is the highest summit, the name Binnein an Fhidhleir is generally used for the whole mountain. The shortest route of ascent is directly up the hillside above Butter Bridge, where there is a carpark. A number of small crags must be avoided, and the route is steep and unrelenting. Alternatively, the mountain can be ascended from further up Glen Kinglas by way of Binnein an Fhidhleir's northern ridge: although longer this route is considerably less steep.
