= Loch Restil =

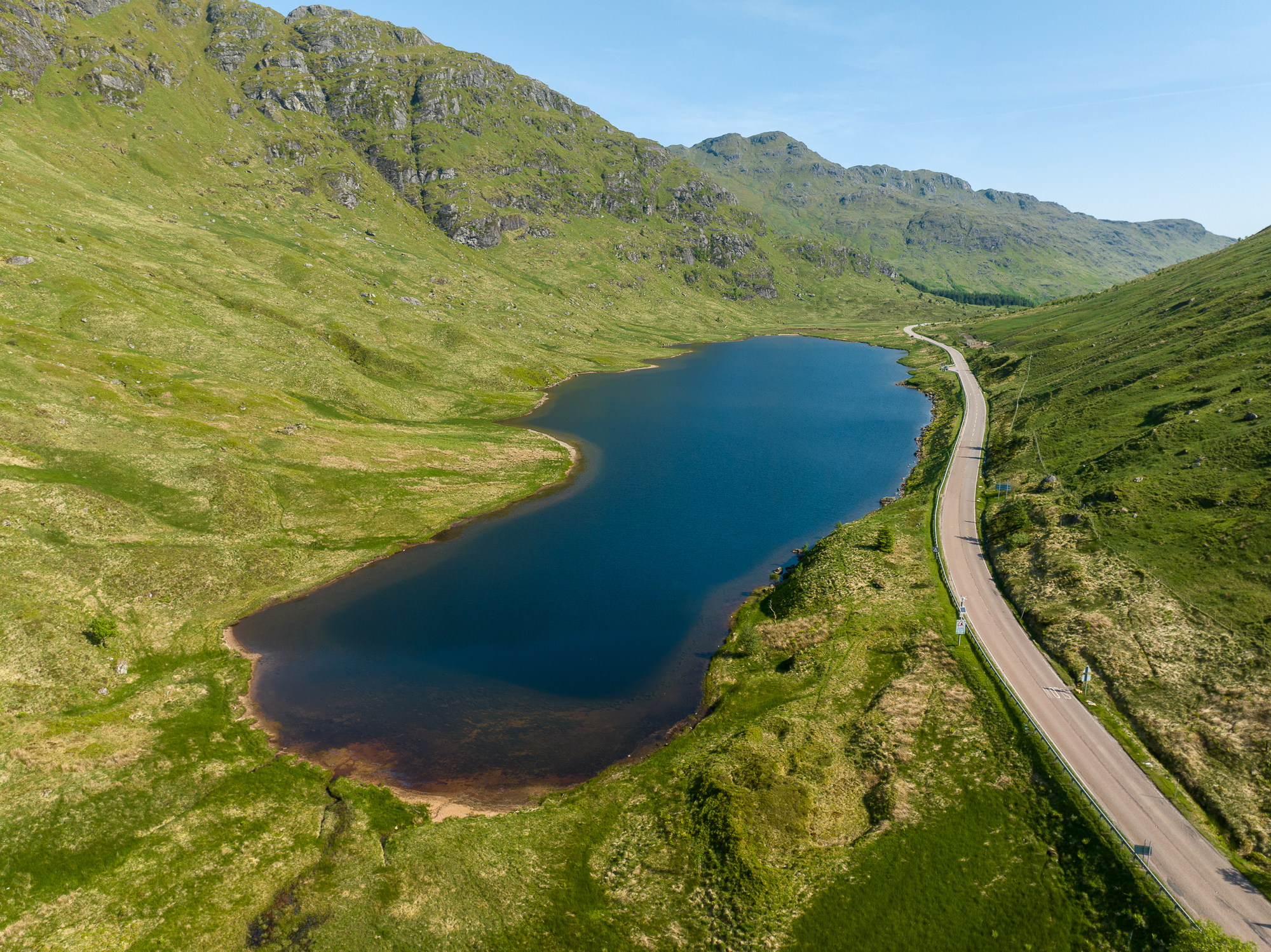
- Loch Restil

- Location within Argyll and Bute
- Location: Cowal, Argyll and Bute, Scotland
- Coordinates: 56.230557°N 4.8585287°W grid reference NN 22904 07899
- Type: Freshwater loch
- Catchment area: Cowal.
- Basin countries: Scotland, United Kingdom.
- Surface elevation: 248 m (814 ft)
- Islands: 0

Loch Restil is a freshwater loch that lies in the pass between Glen Croe and Glen Kinglas on the Cowal Peninsula, in Argyll and Bute, West of Scotland. One of the main roads to the west of Scotland coast, the A83, passes Loch Restil. The burn that flows from Loch Restil is one of the feeds of Kinglas Water, in Glen Kinglas, which flows under the Butter Bridge.

Loch Restil lies within the Argyll Forest Park which is itself a part of the Loch Lomond and The Trossachs National Park.

Loch Restil

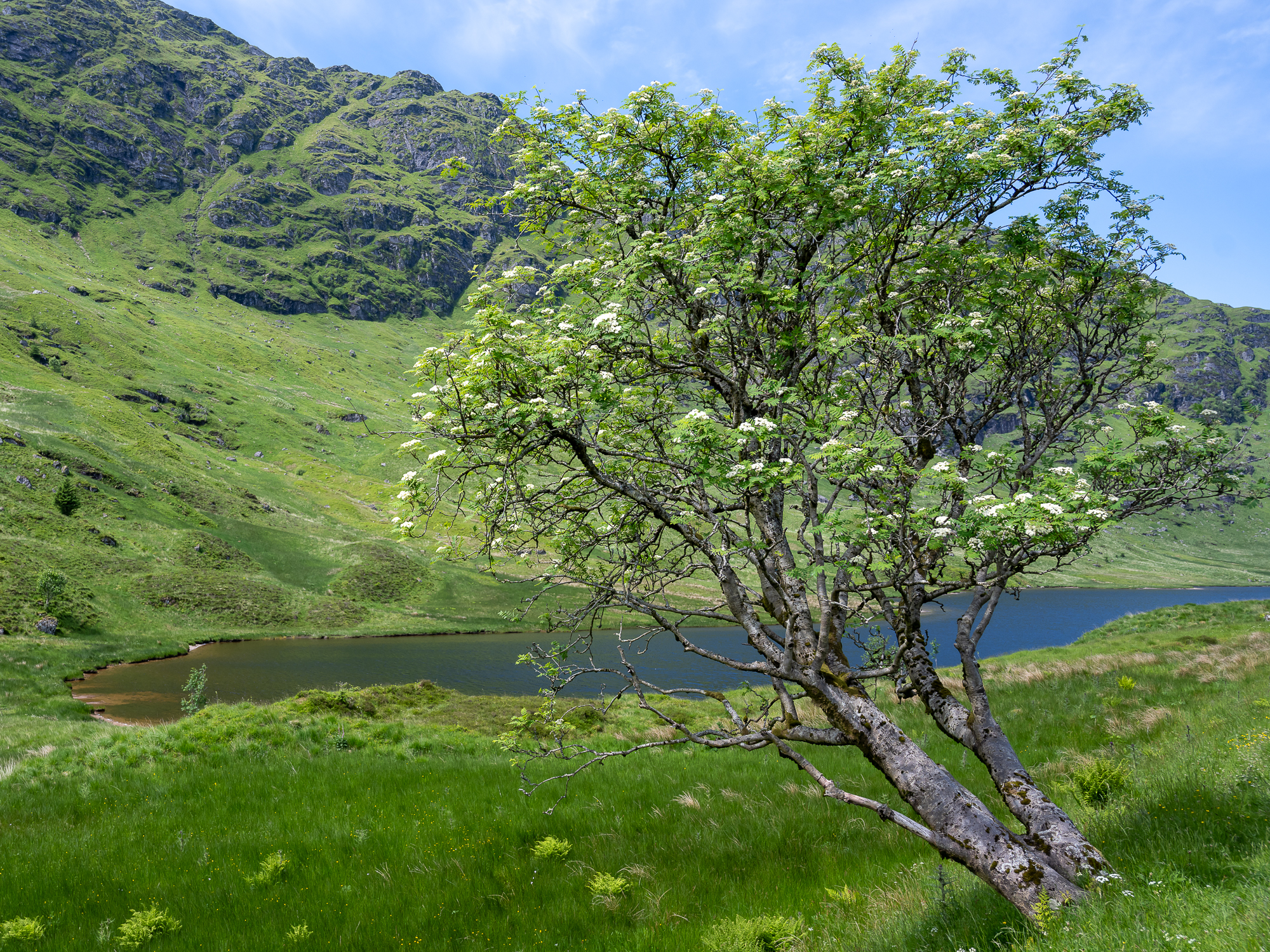
Loch Restil

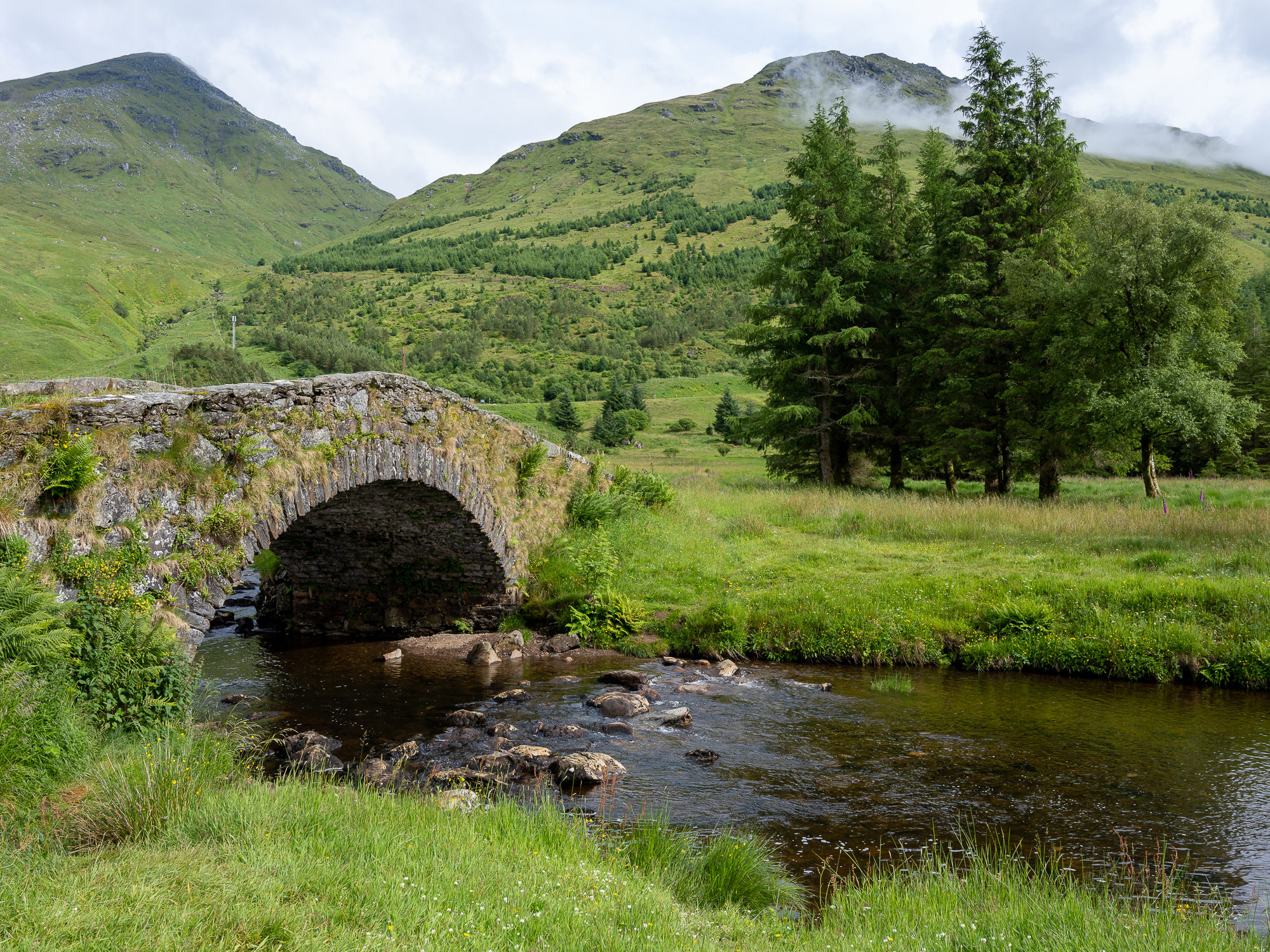
Butter Bridge

== See also ==
Arrochar Alps
