= Attadale, Scotland =

Estate and settlement in Highland, Scotland

Coordinates: 57.39°N 5.45°W

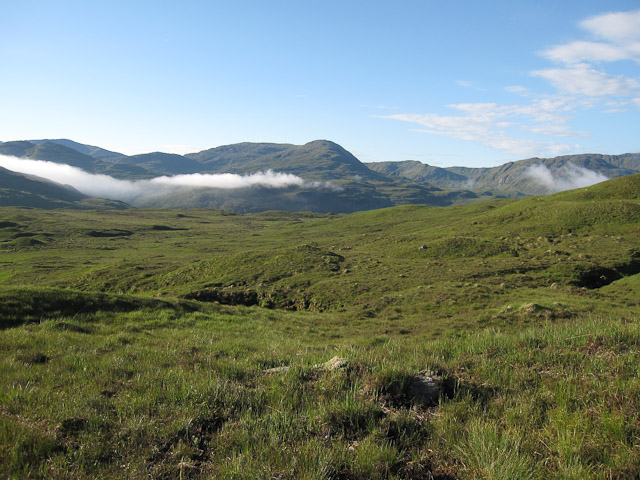
Attadale Forest

Attadale (Gaelic: Attadal ) is a settlement and estate in Wester Ross, in the Highland council area of Scotland. It is on the southern shore of Loch Carron, between the villages of Stromeferry and Strathcarron.

It is served by Attadale railway station on the Kyle of Lochalsh Line.

In Western Australia, the Perth suburb of Attadale was named after this area.

== Attadale Estate ==
The Attadale Estate covers an area of 30,000 acres (12,000 ha), extending as far east as Loch Monar. Mountains within the estate include two Munros, Lurg Mhòr and Bidein a' Choire Sheasgaich, as well as one Corbett, Beinn Dronaig. The estate's gardens feature a Japanese Garden, a Sunken Garden (also with plants of Japanese origin), and a number of sculptures.
