= But and ben =

Type of building

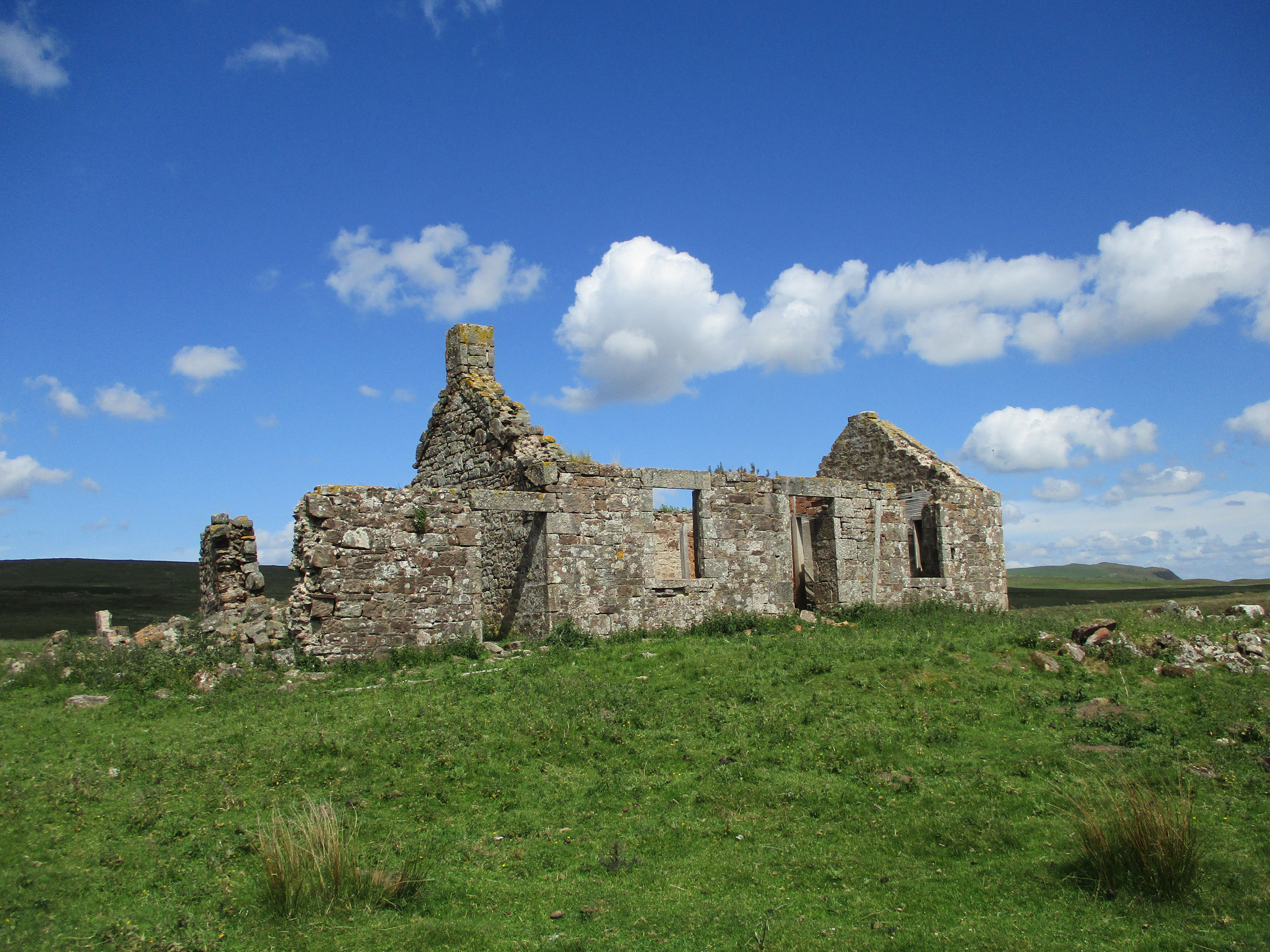
A derelict but and ben near Carnwath, Lanarkshire

A but and ben (Scots for "out and in") is a two-roomed cottage. The outer room, used as an antechamber or kitchen, is the "but", while the inner room, used as a bedroom, is the "ben".

== See also ==
- Blackhouse
- Bothy
- The Broons
