= Bothy =

Permanent basic shelter for temporary use

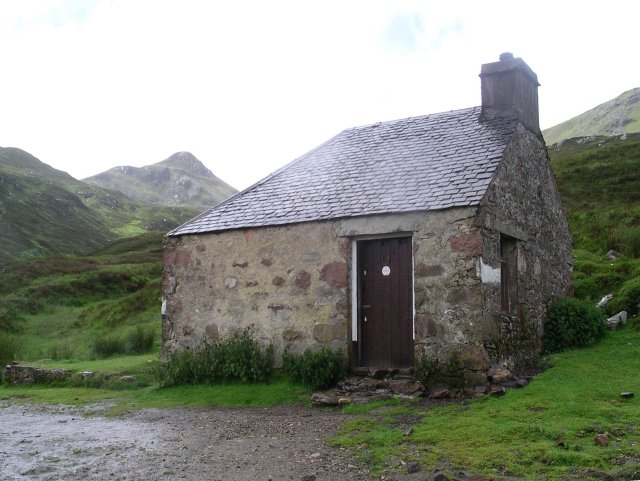
Lairig Leacach Bothy, Lochaber, Scotland

A bothy is a basic shelter, usually left unlocked and available for anyone to use free of charge. It was also a term for basic accommodation, usually for gardeners or other workers on an estate. Bothies are found in remote mountainous areas of Scotland, Northern England, Northern Ireland, and Wales. They are particularly common in the Scottish Highlands, but related buildings can be found around the world (for example, in the Nordic countries there are wilderness huts). A bothy was also a semi-legal drinking den on the Isle of Lewis. These, such as Bothan Eòrapaidh, were used until recent years as gathering points for local men and were often situated in an old hut or caravan.

== Definition ==
In Scots law, bothies are defined as:

"a building of no more than two storeys which—

- (a) does not have any form of—
  - (i) mains electricity,
  - (ii) piped fuel supply, and
  - (iii) piped mains water supply,
- (b) is 100 metres or more from the nearest public road (within the meaning of section 151 of the Roads (Scotland) Act 1984(9)), and
- (c) is 100 metres or more from the nearest habitable building"

Any such building is exempt from council tax and from legislation requiring registration for letting purposes.

== Etymology ==
The etymology of the word bothy is uncertain. Suggestions include a relation to both "hut" as in Irish bothán and Scottish Gaelic bothan or bothag; a corruption of the Welsh term bwthyn, also meaning small cottage; and a derivation from Norse būð, cognate with English booth with a diminutive ending.

== Mountain bothy character ==
Most bothies are ruined buildings which have been restored to a basic standard, providing a windproof and watertight shelter. They vary in size from little more than a large box up to two-storey cottages. They usually have designated sleeping areas, which commonly are either an upstairs room or a raised platform, thus allowing one to keep clear of cold air and draughts at floor height. No bedding, mattresses or blankets are provided. Public access to bothies is either on foot, by bicycle or boat. Most have a fireplace and are near a natural source of water. A spade may be provided to bury waste.

There are thousands of examples to draw from. A typical Scottish bothy is the Salmon Fisherman's Bothy, Newtonhill, which is perched above the Burn of Elsick near its mouth at the North Sea. Another Scottish example from the peak of the salmon fishing in the 1890s is the fisherman's bothy at the mouth of the Burn of Muchalls. A further example is the Lairig Leacach Bothy in Lochaber, not far to the east of Fort William.

== Mountain Bothy code ==
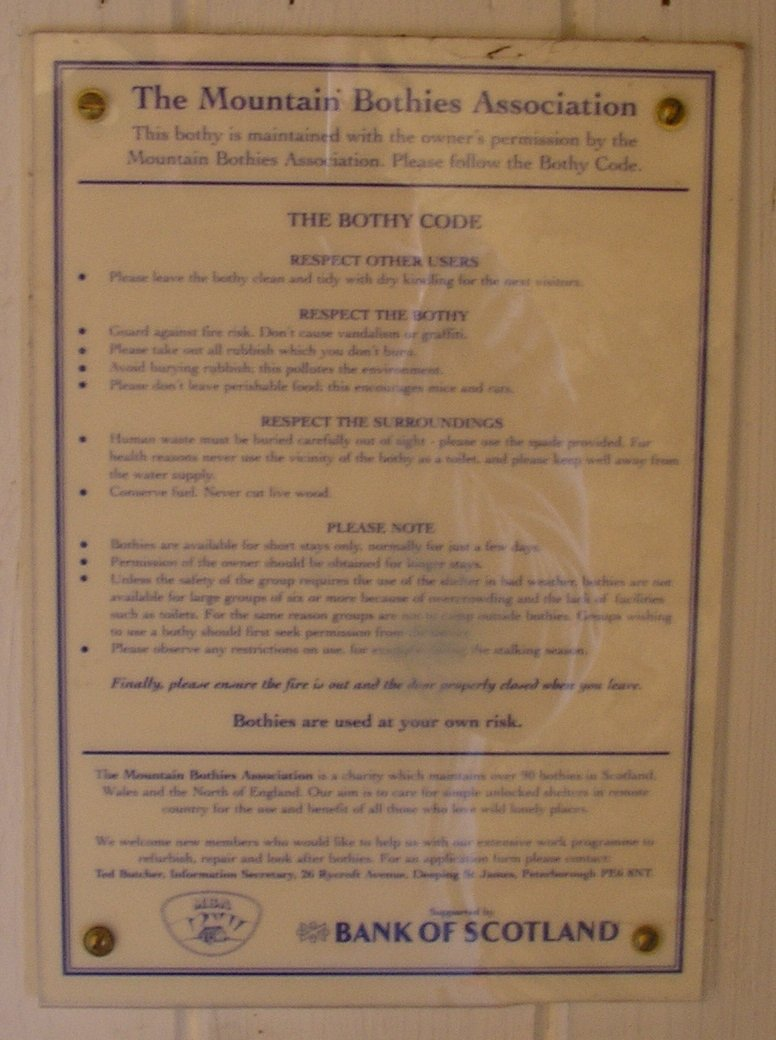
The Bothy Code, seen at the 'Tarf Hotel' Bothy, Perth and Kinross

Because they are freely available to all, the continued existence of bothies relies on users helping look after them. Over the years, the Mountain Bothies Association has developed a Bothy Code that sets out the main points users should respect:

- Bothies are used entirely at users' own risk.
- Leave the bothy clean and tidy with dry kindling for the next visitors. Make other visitors welcome.
- Report any damage to whoever maintains the bothy. Take out all rubbish which you cannot burn. Avoid burying rubbish; this pollutes the environment. Do not leave perishable food as this attracts vermin. Guard against fire risk and ensure the fire is out before you leave. Make sure the doors and windows are properly closed when you leave.
- If there is no toilet at the bothy bury human waste out of sight and well away from the water supply; never use the vicinity of the bothy as a toilet.
- Never cut live wood or damage estate property. Use fuel sparingly.
- Large groups and long stays are to be discouraged – bothies are intended for small groups on the move in the mountains.
- Respect any restrictions on use of the bothy, for example during stag stalking or at lambing time. Please remember bothies are available for short stays only. The owner's permission must be obtained if you intend an extended stay.
- Because of overcrowding and lack of facilities, large groups (6 or more) should not use a bothy nor camp near a bothy without first seeking permission from the owner. Bothies are not available for commercial groups.

== The gardener's bothy ==
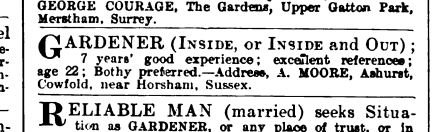
A gardener looking for work and requesting a ‘bothy’. This advertisement, costing 1 shilling and sixpence (1/6), was placed in The Gardeners' Chronicle, May 31st 1913, page xv. Years later Alfred Moore became the head gardener – a post with its own house – at Morden Hall Park in south London as recalled here (archived here).

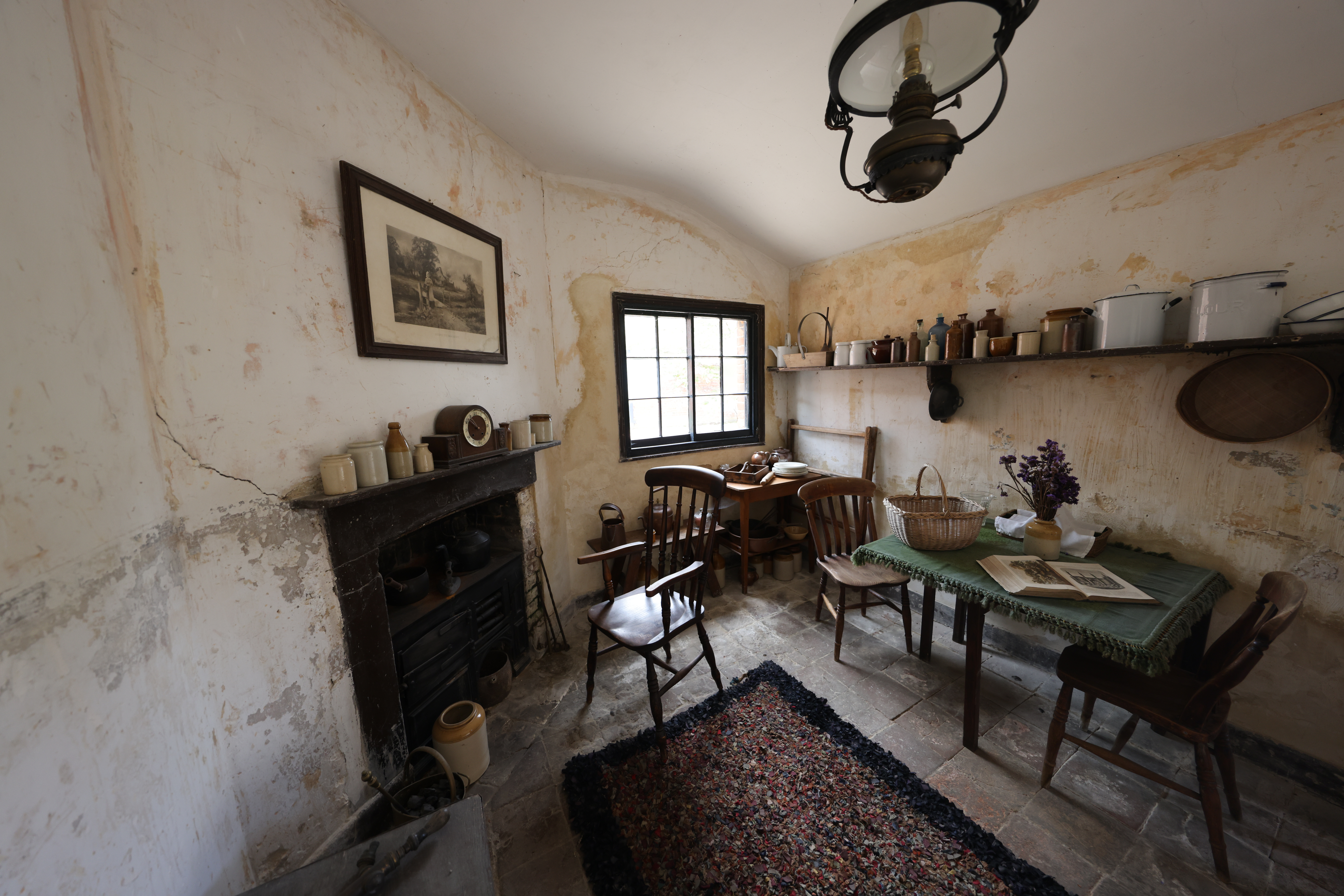
The interior of the gardener's bothy at Audley End House

The Gardeners Chronicle of 1906 rather grandly defines a bothy as “the apartments in a garden allotted for the residence of under gardeners”. These came in a variety of sizes. An advertisement from 1880 notes “two in bothy”. At the other end of the scale was “The Royal Bothy” at Frogmore (near Windsor castle) with accommodation for 24 gardeners, and of sufficient interest to be listed in Scientific American Building Monthly. A more recent summary mentions intermediate sized bothys housing three to six gardeners.

Bothy quality varied as well as the size. Frogmore, in 1903, had not only lavatories and dining room, but included a sick room and reading room. However at the other extreme one author in 1842 reported:

The bothy is commonly a little lonely shed placed on the north side of the north wall of the kitchen-garden; that small apartment has often to be kitchen, breakfast-room, dining-room, parlour, bed-room, dressing-room, and study, for men that deserve better accommodation. If a little of the money that is spent upon dog-kennels were employed in erecting decent habitations for journeymen gardeners, gentlemen would receive a higher rate of interest for money laid out in such a way, than they do from much of their wealth that is sent out in other directions.

Having local accommodation for gardening staff was not just a convenience but a necessity. The twelve gardeners in Baron Rothschild's bothy in France not only worked the 6-till-6 day shift in 1880, but every day one of them was the “night guard” to look after the forty different fires. Another article notes that the gardeners had to be up every 4 hours at night to note the temperatures.

Bothy life seems to have been varied, with some of the flavour of a student residence. In some cases gardeners were fined for being untidy, and forbidden to sing. Another ex-bothy resident recalled gardeners arriving with heavy heart, having left home for the first time, but regretful years later on leaving the bothy. In “A bothy Yuletide” he describes how, despite the necessity for two gardeners to remain on duty over the holiday to bank up the fires, the others accompanied them on their rounds and “the sound of Christmas carols mingled strangely with the rattle of the shovel”.

== Ownership ==
Bothies are usually owned by the landowner of the estate on which they stand, although the actual owner is rarely involved in any way, other than by permitting their continued existence, and by helping with transport of materials. Many are maintained by volunteers from the Mountain Bothies Association (MBA), a charity that looks after 97 bothies in Scotland, the north of England, and Wales.

The location of these bothies can be found on the Mountain Bothies Association (MBA) website, along with information on how people can help.

== In popular culture ==
- The Bothie of Toper-na-fuosich, 1848 poem by Arthur Hugh Clough
- The song Am Bothan a Bh'Aig Fionnghuala ("Fionghuala's Bothy") is a traditional song recorded by the Bothy Band in 1976.
- The album Bothy Culture by Scottish Celtic fusion artist Martyn Bennett is named for the partying of shepherds and travellers in bothies.

== See also ==
- Adirondack lean-to
- Bivouac shelter
- Bolt-hole
- Bothy ballad
- But and ben – a simple two room cottage structure
- Byre-dwelling
- Castaway depot
- Cleit
- Crannog
- Mountain hut – building located in the mountains intended to provide food and shelter to mountaineers, climbers and hikers
- Shieling
- Wilderness hut – rent-free, open dwelling place for temporary accommodation, usually located in wilderness areas, national parks and along backpacking routes
