= Mountain Bothies Association =

Scottish registered charity

The Mountain Bothies Association (MBA) is a Scottish registered charity. It looks after 104 bothies and two emergency mountain shelters (not to be mistaken for or confused with a mountain hut, as the Fords of Avon and Garbh Choire refuges are little more than a heavily weather protected shed). Of these, only two bothies (Over Phawhope and Glen Pean) are owned by the charity. The remainder are maintained with the agreement and encouragement of the owners. The majority are in Scotland with the remainder in Wales and Northern England. These may be stayed in without charge.

The object of the charity is to maintain simple shelters in remote country for the use and benefit of all who love wild and lonely places. All maintenance work is financed from the MBA's own resources, mainly membership subscriptions supplemented by donations from benefactors, some of whom wish to commemorate a relative or friend who was a hillwalker or climber.

Bothies sometimes have an outside toilet but the majority do not. When this is not the case a toilet spade and guidance as to the appropriate disposal of toilet waste are provided within the bothy. Raised platforms or bunks may have been installed for sleeping, but this is not always the case. The floor, particularly an attic floor, may also be suitable to sleep on with the aid of a sleeping pad. Visitors are expected to stay for no more than a night or two before moving on. Groups of six or more and commercial groups are not allowed.

== History ==
The MBA was founded by Bernard Heath in 1965. He was inspired by a comment by Alan Murdock in the visitors' book at Backhill of Bush. He first organised the restoration that summer of the ruined farmhouse at Tunskeen as an unlocked shelter, and then with Alan called the meeting on 28 December 1965 in Dalmellington at which the MBA was formed, "To maintain simple unlocked shelters in remote mountain country for the use of hillwalkers, climbers and other genuine outdoor enthusiasts who love the wild and lonely places".

In 1975 the MBA became a registered charity. In 1998, the Association was incorporated as a company limited by guarantee, still remaining a registered charity.

As of April 2018, the MBA had a membership of around 4,300. They receive a quarterly newsletter and annual report, but do not have any privileged rights (i.e. the bothies themselves are equally open to all).

== Structure ==
=== Maintenance Organisers ===
Each bothy has one Maintenance Organiser (or, in some cases, a small team of two or three), who monitor the bothy and arrange routine maintenance. MOs are the lifeblood of the organisation.

=== Area Organisers ===
The UK is divided into nine areas:

- Northern Highlands
- North West Highlands and Islands
- Western Highlands and Islands
- Central Highlands
- South West Highlands and Islands
- Eastern Highlands
- Southern Scotland
- Northern England and Borders
- Wales

The Maintenance Organisers of the bothies in each area form the respective Area Committees. Each committee elects an Area Organiser to chair their meetings and to coordinate the work of the Area.

=== Project Organisers ===
Project Organisers run a particular renovation or major maintenance project. This is a short-term responsibility, unlike that of a Maintenance Organiser.

=== Board of trustees ===
The Board of Trustees is directly elected by the members. It has control over the finances and is responsible for managing the company.
