= Scottish Gaelic place names =

The following place names are either derived from Scottish Gaelic or have Scottish Gaelic equivalents:

== Endonyms ==
=== Scotland ===
The place type in the list for Scotland records all inhabited areas as City. According to British government definitions, there are only eight Scottish cities; they are Aberdeen, Dundee, Dunfermline, Edinburgh, Glasgow, Inverness, Perth and Stirling. The other locations may be described by such terms as town, burgh, village, hamlet, settlement, estate depending on their size and administrative status. Many other smaller settlements have been described as cities traditionally.

Scotland Alba
English	Scottish Gaelic		Place type	Notes
English	Name	Meaning	Place type	Notes
Aberarder	Obar Àrdair		City	
Aberchalder	Obar Chaladair		City	
Aberchirder	Obar Chiardair		City	
Aberdeen	Obar Dheathain	Estuary of the River Don	City	
Aberdeenshire	Siorrachd Obar Dheathain		County	
Aberdour	Obar Dobhair		City	
Aberfeldy	Obar Pheallaidh		City	
Aberfoyle	Obar Phuill		City	
Aberlemno	Obar Leamhnach	Estuary of the Lemno Burn (the burn of elm trees)	City	
Aberlour	Obar Lobhair		City	
Abhainn a' Ghlinne Mhòir	Abhainn a' Ghlinne Mhòir	River of the great valley	River	
Aboyne	Abèidh	Rippling Ford	City	
Abriachan	Obar Itheachan		City	
Acha	An t-Achadh	The field	City	
Achachork	Achadh a' Choirce	Field of oats	City	
Achahoish	Achadh a’ Chòis		City	
Achanalt	Achadh nan Allt	Field of the stream	City	
Achandunie	Achadh an Dùnaidh		City	
Acharacle	Àth Tharracail	Torquil's ford	City	
Achaphubuil	Achadh a' Phùbaill	Field of the tent	City	
Achateny	Achadh an Teine	Field of the fire	City	
Achentoul	Achadh an t-Sabhail	Field of the barn	City	
Achgarve	An t-Achadh Garbh	The rough field	City	
Achinahuagh	Achadh na h-Uamha	Field of the cave	City	
Achintee	Achadh an t-Suidhe	Field of the seat	City	
Achintraid	Achadh na Tràghad	Field of the shore	City	
Achindrean	Achadh an Dreaghainn	Field of the thorny bush	City	
Achininver	Achadh an Inbhir	Field of the estuary	City	
Achinduich	Achadh an Dabhaich	Field of the pond	City	
Achnacarry	Achadh na Cairidh	Field of the weir	City	
Achnaha	Achadh na h-Àtha	Field of the kiln	City	
Achnahanat	Achadh na h-Annaid		City	
Achnagarron	Achadh nan Gearran	Field of the hares	City	
Achnamara	Achadh na Mara	Field of the ocean	City	
Achnasaul	Achadh nan Sabhal	Field of the barns	City	
Achnasheen	Achadh na Sìne	Field of the storm	City	
Achnashellach	Achadh nan Seileach	Field of the willow trees	City	
Achriesgill	Achadh Rìdhisgil		City	
Achosnich	Achadh Osnaich		City	
Achvarasdal	Achadh Mharasdail		City	
Achvaich	Achadh a' Bhàthaich		City	
Ailsa Craig	Creag Ealasaid		Island	
Aird of Kinloch	An Àird	The point	City	
Airdrie	An t-Àrd Ruigh		City	
Alexandria	Am Magh Leamhna, Cathair Alastair		City	
Alford	Athfort		City	
Alladale River	Abhainn Alladail		River	
Alloa	Alamhagh, Allmhagh Mor		City	
Alness	Alanais		City	
Altnaharra	Allt na h-Eirbhe	Stream of the border wall	City	
Alva	Allmhagh Beag		City	
Alves	An Àbha(i)s		City	
Alvie	Albhaidh		City	
Alyth	Ailt		City	
Amulree	Àth Maol Ruibhe	Ford of St Máel Ruba	City	
Annan	Inbhir Anainn		City	
Annat	An Annaid		City	
Angus	Aonghas	Derived from the personal name Aonghas	City	
Angus	Siorrachd Aonghais		County	Alternative name Forfarshire
Appin	An Apainn		City	
Arbirlot	Obar Eilid	Estuary of the Elliot Water	City	
Arbroath	Obar Bhrothaig	Estuary of the Brothock Water	City	
Ardachu	Àrd Achadh	High field	City	
Ardalanish	Àird Dealanais		City	
Ardanaiseig	Àird an Aiseig	Height of the ferry	City	
Ardbeg	Àirde Beaga		City	
Ardcharnich	Àird Cheatharnaich		City	
Ardclach	Àird Chlach	Height of stones	City	
Ardentinny	Àird an t-Sionnaich/ an Teine	Height of the fox, or height of fire	City	
Ardfern	Àird Fheàrna	Height of alder trees	City	
Ardlui	Àird Laoigh	Height of the calves	City	
Ardrossan	Àird Rosain		City	
Ardrishaig	Àird Driseig		City	
Ardtun	Àird Tunna		City	
Arduaine	An Àird Uaine	The green height	City	
Argyll	Earra-Ghàidheal	Coastland of the Gaels	County	
Argyll and Bute	Earra-Ghaidheal agus Bòd		Region	
Arinagour	Àirigh nan Gobhar	Shieling of the goats	City	
Arnprior	Earrann a' Phriair		City	
Arrochar	An t-Àrar/ Tairbeart Iar		City	
Auchindrain	Achadh an Droighinn	The field of thorns	City	
Auchinleck	Achadh nan Leac	Field of the stones	City	
Auchenblae	Achadh nam Blàth		City	
Auchterarder	Uachdar Àrdair		City	
Aviemore	An Aghaidh Mhòr	The great field	City	
Ayr	Inbhir Àir	Slaughter estuary	City	
Ayrshire	Siorrachd Inbhir Àir		County	
Badenyon	Bad an Eòin	Jonathan's spot	City	
Balallan	Baile Ailein	Alan's town	City	
Baleshare	Baile Sear	East town	Island	
Ballachulish	Baile a' Chaolais	Town of the narrows	City	
Ballater	Bealadair		City	
Balloch	Bealach	Mountain pass	City	
Balmedie	Baile Mheadhain	Middle town	City	
Banchory	Beannchar		City	
Banff	Banbh		City	
Banffshire	Siorrachd Bhanbh		County	
Bannockburn	Allt a' Bhonnaich		City	
Barcaldine	Am Barra Calltainn	Hazel Summit	City	
Barra	(Eilean) B(h)arraigh		Island	
Barra Head	Beàrnaraigh	Gaelic translation of the Old Norse name which meant 'Bjorn's Island'	Island	
Barrhead	Ceann a' Bharra		City	
Bearsden	Cille Phàdraig Ùr	New Kilpatrick	City	
Beauly	A' Mhanachainn	The monastery	City	
Beinn a' Ghlò	Beinn a' Ghlò	Hill of the Veil or Mist	Mountain	
Beinn an Lochain	Beinn an Lochain	Mountain of the pond	Mountain	
Beinn Bheula	Beinn Bheula		Mountain	
Beinn Bhuidhe (Glen Fyne)	A' Bheinn Bhuidhe	The yellow mountain	Mountain	
Beinn Dorain	Beinn Dòbhrain	Otter mountain	Mountain	
Beinn Lochain	Beinn Lochain	Pond mountain	Mountain	
Beinn Luibhean	Beinn Luibhean		Mountain	
Beinn Narnain	Beinn Narnain		Mountain	
Beinn Reithe	Beinn Reithe	Ram mountain	Mountain	
Beinn Ìme	Beinn Ìme		Mountain	
Bellochantuy	Bealach an t-Suidhe	Mountain pass of the seat	City	
Ben Arthur	Beinn Artair		Mountain	
Ben Avon	Beinn Athfhinn		Mountain	
Ben Donich	Beinn Dòmhnaich	Mountain of the lord	Mountain	
Ben Ledi	Beinn Leitir	Mountain of the slope	Mountain	
Ben Lomond	Beinn Laomainn		Mountain	
Ben Lui	Beinn Laoigh	Calf mountain	Mountain	
Ben Macdui	Beinn Mac Duibh		Mountain	
Ben More (Mull)	Beinn Mhòr	Great mountain	Mountain	
Ben Nevis	Beinn Nibheis	Nevis mountain	Mountain	Nevis has an unknown etymology
Ben Vane	Beinn Mheadhain	Middle mountain	Mountain	
Ben Vorlich	Beinn Mhùrlaig		Mountain	
Benbecula	Beinn nam Fadhla		Island	
Benderloch	Meadarloch	From Beinn Eadar Dà Loch, mountain between two lakes	City	
Bennachie	Beinn na Cìche	Mountain of the breast	Mountain	
Berneray (North Uist)	Beàrnaraigh (na Hearadh)		Island	
Bervie Water	Uisge Bhiorbhaigh		River	
Berwickshire	Siorrachd Bhearaig		County	
Binnein an Fhidhleir	Binnein an Fhidhleir	Little peak of the fiddler	Mountain	
Birnam	Biorman		City	
Bishopbriggs	Coille Dobhair		City	
Blair Atholl	Blàr Athaill		City	
Blairgowrie and Rattray	Blàr Ghobharaidh agus Reatair		City	
Bonawe	Bun Abha	River base	City	
Borders	Na Crìochan		Region	
Borrowstounness	Ceann Fhàil	Ditch's end	City	
Braemar	Bràigh Mhàrr	Big Hill	City	
Braeriach	(Am) Bràigh Riabhach	Brindled upland	Mountain	
Brechin	Breichinn		City	
Bridge of Allan	Drochaid Alain		City	
Bridge of Cally	Drochaid Challaidh		City	
Broadford	An t-Àth Leathann	The broad ford, a mistranslation of the Norse name Breiðafjorðr, broad fjord	City	
Buckie	Bucaidh		City	
Burnt Islands	Na h-Eileanan Loisgte		Island	
Burntisland	An t-Eilean Loisgte		City	
Bunessan	Bun Easain	Base of the little waterfall	City	
Cairn Gorm	An Càrn Gorm		Mountain	
Cairn Toul	Càrn an t-Sabhail		Mountain	
Cairnbaan	An Càrn Bàn		City	
Cairndow	An Càrn Dubh		City	
Cairngorms	Am Monadh Ruadh	The red moor	Mountain	
Cairnwell Pass	Càrn a' Bhailg		Pass	
Caithness	Gallaibh	Among the (Norse) foreigners	County	
Calgary	Calgarraidh		City	
Callander	Calasraid		City	
Campbeltown	Ceann Locha, Ceann Chille Chiarain	Head of the loch	City	
Campbeltown Loch	Loch Chille Chiarain	Loch of the church of Ciaran	Lake	
Canna	Canaigh		Island	
Cara Island	Cara		Island	
Cardross	Càrdainn Ros		City	
Carmyllie	Càrn Mhìlidh	Cairn of the warriors	City	
Càrn Glas	Càrn Glas	Green cairn	Mountain	
Carnoustie	Càrn Ùstaidh		City	
Carradale	Càrradal		City	
Carron Water, Aberdeenshire	Carrann		River	
Carron Water, Dumfriesshire	Carrann		River	
Castlebay	Bàgh a' Chaisteil	Bay of the castle	City	
Central Region	Roinn Meadhanach		Region	
Clach Bheinn (Lochgoilhead)	Clach Bheinn (Lochgoilhead)		Mountain	
Clackmannanshire	Siorrachd Chlach Mhanainn		County	
Cladich	An Cladach	The rocky shore	City	
Clarkston	Baile Chlarc		City	
Clydebank	Bruach Chluaidh		City	
Cnoc Coinnich	Cnoc Coinnich	Kenneth's hill	Mountain	
Coatbridge	Drochaid a' Chòta		City	
Colintraive	Caol an t-Snàimh		City	
Coll	Cola		Island	
Colonsay	Colbhasa		Island	
Comrie	Cuimridh		City	
Connel	A' Chonghail		City	
Corgarff	Corr Garaidh		City	
Coulport	An Cùl Phort		City	
County of Bute (Buteshire)	Siorrachd Bhòid		County	
County of Moray (Morayshire)	Moireibh		County	Alternative Name Elginshire
Coupar Angus	Cùbar Aonghais		City	
Cowal	Còmhghall		City	
Cowdenbeath	Coilltean Beithe		City	
Cowie	Collaidh		City	
Cowie Water	Uisge Chollaidh		River	
Craigellachie	Creag Eileachaidh		City	
Craigendoran	Creag an Dòbhrain	Rock of the otter	City	
Craighouse	Taigh na Creige	House of the rock	City	
Craignish	Creiginis	Rock isle	City	
Craignure	Creag an Iubhair	Rock of the yew tree	City	
Crathie	Craichidh		City	
Crianlarich	A' Chrìon-Làraich		City	
Crieff	Craoibh	Tree place	City	
Crimond	Crioch/Crith Mhonadh		City	
Crinan	An Crìonan		City	
Cromarty	Cromba	The crooked bay	City	
Cromartyshire	Siorrachd Chromb		County	
Cruach nam Miseag	Cruach nam Miseag		Mountain	
Cruach nam Mult	Cruach nam Mult		Mountain	
Cruach nan Capull	Cruach nan Capull		Mountain	
Cruden Bay	Inbhir Chruidein		City	
Cuillin	An Cuiltheann		Mountain	
Cullen	Inbhir Cuilinn	Holly estuary	City	
Culloden	Cùil Lodair		City	
Cumbernauld	Comar nan Allt	Confluence of the streams	City	
Cumnock	Cumnag	Little pail	City	
Cupar	Cupar		City	
Dalavich	Dail Abhaich		City	
Dalkeith	Dail Chè	World plain	City	
Dallas	Dalais		City	
Dalmally	Clachan an Dìseirt, Dail Mhàilidh		City	
Dalnaspidal	Dail na Spideil		City	
Dingwall	Inbhir Pheofharain	Estuary of the River Peffer	City	
Dinnet	Dùnaidh		City	
Dornoch	Dòrnach	Abounding in fists, or fist-sized stones	City	
Drumlemble	Druim Leamhan	Elm ridge	City	
Drumoak	Druim M'Aodhaig		City	
Dubh Artach	Dubh Artach		City	
Dufftown	Baile Bhainidh		City	
Dumbarton	Dùn Breata(i)nn	Fortress of the Britons	City	
Dumfries	Dùn Phris		City	
Dumfriesshire	Siorrachd Dhùn Phris		County	
Dunbar	Dùn Bàrr	Top fortress	City	
Dunbartonshire	Siorrachd Dhùn Breatainn		County	
Dunbeg	An Dùn Beag	The small fortress	City	Formerly Dunstaffnage (Dùn Stafhainis)
Dunblane	Dùn Bhlàthain	Fortress of flowers	City	
Dundee	Dùn Dè	God's fortress	City	
Dunfermline	Dùn Phàrlain		City	
Dunkeld	Dùn Chailleann	Fortress of the Caledonians	City	
Dunnichen	Dùn Eachain	Eachan's fort. Older name was Dùn Neachdain, Nechtan's fort	City	
Dunoon	Dùn Omhain		City	
Dunstaffnage	Dùn Stafhainis		City	
Duntocher	Druim/ Dùn Tòchair		City	
Dyke	Dìg	Ditch	City	
East Kilbride	Cille Bhrìghde an Ear		City	
Easdale	Eilean Èisdeal		Island	
East Lothian	Labhdaidh/ Lodainn an Ear		County	Alternative Name Haddingtonshire
Edinburgh	Dùn Èideann	Eidyn's fortress	City	
Edzell	Eigill		City	Formerly Slateford
Eigg	Eige		Island	
Eilean Dubh Mòr	Eilean Dubh Mòr	Great black island	Island	
Eilean Dubh	Eilean Dubh	Black island	Island	
Elgin	Eilginn		City	
Ellenabeich	Eilean nam Beitheach	Island of the birchwoods	Island	
Ellon	Eilean	Island	City	
Eriskay	Èirisgeigh		Island	
Erraid	Eilean Earraid	Sheriff island	Island	
Erskine	Arasgain		City	
Eyemouth	Inbhir Eighe	Ice estuary	City	
Fair Isle	Eilean nan Geansaidh	Island of the sweaters	Island	
Falkirk	An Eaglais Bhreac	The spotted church	City	
Fetterangus	Fothair Aonghais		City	
Fettercairn	Fothair Chàrdain		City	
Fife	Fìobha		Region, County	
Findon	Fionndan		City	
Fingal's Cave	An Uaimh Bhinn	The musical cave	Cave	
Fionnphort	Fionnphort	White port	City	
Firth of Clyde	Linne Chluaidh		Bay	North of Arran
Firth of Clyde	An Linne Ghlas	The green bay	Bay	South of Arran
Firth of Forth	Linne Foirthe		Bay	
Firth of Lorn	An Linne Latharnach		Bay	
Firth of Tay	Linne Tatha		Bay	
Fishnish	Finnsinis		Port	
Flodaigh	Flodaigh		Island	
Footdee	Bun Dè	God's base	Pass	
Ford	Àth na Crà	Ford of the sheepfold	City	
Formartine	Fearann Mhàrtainn	Martin's land	City	
Forres	Farrais		City	
Fort Augustus	Cille Chuimein		City	
Fort William	An Gearasdan	The garrison	City	
Fortingall	Fartairchill		City	
Fortrose	A' Chananaich	The canonry	City	
Fraoch-eilean	Fraoch-eilean		Island	
Fraserburgh	A' Bhruaich	The riverbank	City	
Furnace	An Fhùirneis		City	Formerly Inverleacainn (Inbhir Leacainn)
Galashiels	An Geal Àth	The bright ford	City	
Gare Loch	An Geàrr Loch	The short lake	Lake	
Garelochhead	Ceann a' Gheàrr-loch	Head of Gare Loch	City	
Gatehouse of Fleet	Taigh an Rathaid		City	
Giffnock	Giofnag		City	
Gigha	Giogha		Island	
Glasgow	Glaschu	Green hollow	City	
Glen Fruin	Gleann Freòin		Valley	
Glen Tilt	Gleann Teilt		Valley	
Glencoe	Gleann Comhann	Valley of the river Coe	Valley	
Glenbarr	Am Bàrr	The top	City	
Glendaruel	Gleann Dà Ruadhail		Valley	
Gleneagles	Gleann Eaglais	Church valley	Valley	
Glenrothes	Gleann Ràthais		City	
Gometra	Gòmastra		Island	
Gourock	Guireag	Hatchling	City	
Govan	Baile a' Ghobhainn	Town of the smith. Gaelicisation of an older Cumbric name (G)uovan	City	
Grampian	Roinn a' Mhonaidh		Region	
Grampian Mountains	Am Monadh	The moor	Mountain	
Grangemouth	Inbhir Ghrainnse		City	
Great Bernera	Beàrnaraigh Mòr		Island	
Greenock	Grianaig	Little sun	City	
Gretna	Greatna		City	
Grimsay	Griomasaigh		Island	
Grimsay (South East Benbecula)	Griomasaigh		Island	
Gulf of Corryvreckan	Coire Bhreacain		Strait	
Gunna	Gunnaigh		Island	
Haddington	Baile Adainn		City	
Hamilton	Hamaltan		City	
Harris	Na Hearadh		Island	
Hawick	Hamhaig		City	
Hebrides	Innse Gall	Islands of the foreigners	Region	
Helensburgh	Baile Eilidh		City	
Highland	A' Ghàidhealtachd		Region	
Holy Loch	An Loch Seunta/ Sianta		Lake	
Huntly	Hunndaidh		City	Formerly Strathbogie (Srath Bhalgaidh)
Inch Kenneth	Innis Choinnich	Kenneth's island	Island	
Inchmarnock	Innis Mheàrnaig	Island of Saint Marnock	Island	
Inner Hebrides	Na h-Eileanan a-staigh		Islands	
Insch	An Innis	The isle	City	
Inveralligin	Inbhir Àiliginn		City	
Inverallochy and Cairnbulg	Inbhir Aileachaidh agus Càrn Builg		City	
Inveraray	Inbhir Aora		City	
Inverbervie	Inbhir Biorbhaidh		City	
Inverkeilor	Inbhir Chìollair		City	
Inverkeithing	Inbhir Chèitein		City	
Inverness	Inbhir Nis	Estuary of the River Ness	City	
Inverness-shire	Siorrachd Inbhir Nis		County	
Inversnaid	Inbhir Snàthaid		City	
Inverurie	Inbhir Ùraidh		City	
Inveruglas Isle	Innis Inbhir Dhughlais		Island	
Iona	Ì (Chaluim Chille)		Island	
Island Davaar	Eilean Dà Bhàrr		Island	
Islay	Ìle		Island	
Isle of Arran	Arainn		Island	
Isle of Bute	Bòd, Eilean Bhòdach, Eilean Bhòid		Island	
Isle of Jura	Diùra		Island	
Isle of Mull	Muile		Island	
Jedburgh	Deadard		City	
John o' Groats	Taigh Iain Ghròt		City	
Kames	Camas nam Muclach		City	
Keith	Baile Chè	Wood town	City	
Kelso	Cealsaidh		City	
Kemnay	Ceann a' Mhuigh		City	
Kenmore	An Ceannmhor	The big head	City	
Kensaleyre	Ceann Sàil Eighre		City	
Kerrera	Cearrara		City	
Kilberry	Cill Bheiridh		City	
Kildrummy	Cionn Droma		City	
Killearn	Cill Earnain		City	
Killiecrankie	Coille Chreithnich		City	
Killin	Cill Fhinn		City	
Kilmarnock	Cille Mhèarnaig	Church of Saint Marnock	City	
Kilmartin	Cille Mhàrtainn	Church of Saint Martin	City	
Kilmelford	Cill Mheallaird		City	
Kilmun	Cill Mhunna		City	
Kilninver	Cill an Inbhir, Cill Fhionnbhair		City	
Kilsyth	Cill Saidhe		City	
Kincardineshire	Siorrachd Chinn Chàrdainn		County	
Kingussie	Ceann a' Ghiuthsaich	Head of the pine forest	City	
Kinloch Rannoch	Ceann Loch Raineach	End of fern lake	City	
Kinross-shire	Siorrachd Chinn Rois		County	
Kintore	Ceann Tòrr	End heap	City	
Kintyre	Cinn Tìre	Region's end	City	
Kippen	An Ceapan		City	
Kirkcaldy	Cair Chaladain		City	
Kirkcudbright	Cille Chuithbeirt		City	
Kirkcudbrightshire	Siorrachd Chill Chuithbeirt		County	
Kirkintilloch	Cair/Cathair C(h)eann Tulaich		City	
Kirkmichael	Cille Mhìcheil	Michael's churchyard	City	
Kirkwall	Baile na h-Eaglais	City of the church	City	
Kirriemuir	Ceathramh Mhoire	Mary's quarterland	City	
Knapdale	Cnapadal		City	
Knockan	An Cnocan		City	
Kyle of Lochalsh	Caol Loch Aillse		City	
Kyles of Bute	Na Caoil Bhòdach		Channel	
Lagavulin	Lag a' Mhuilinn	Hollow of the mill	City	
Lairig Ghru	Làirig Dhrù	Pass of Dhru/Druie	Pass	
Lanark	Lannraig		City	
Lanarkshire	Siorrachd Lanraig		County	
Langholm	Langaim		City	
Larbert	Lèirbert		City	
Largs	An Leargaidh (Gallda)		City	
Laurencekirk	Coinmheadh		City	
Leith	Lìte		City	
Lesmahagow	Lios MoChuda		City	
Lewis	Leòdhas	Uncertain	Island	
Lhanbryde	Lann Brìghde	Church-enclosure of Saint Brigid of Kildare	City	
Linlithgow	Gleann Iucha		City	
Lismore	Lios Mòr	The great garden	Island	
Little Colonsay	Colbhasa Beag		Island	
Livingston	Baile Dhùnlèibhe		City	
Loch Affric	Loch Afraig		Lake	
Loch Ard	Loch na h-Àirde	Lake of the height	Lake	
Loch Arkaig	Loch Airceig		Lake	
Loch Assynt	Loch Asaint		Lake	
Loch Awe	Loch Obha		Lake	
Loch Cluanie	Loch Cluanaidh		Lake	
Loch Doon	Loch Dhùin		Lake	
Loch Drunkie	Loch Drongaidh		Lake	
Loch Earn	Loch Èireann	Ireland lake	Lake	
Loch Eck	Loch Eich	Horse lake	Lake	
Loch Ericht	Loch Eireachd		Lake	
Loch Etive	Loch Eite		Lake	
Loch Fyne	Loch Fìne		Lake	
Loch Garry	Loch Gàrraidh	Garden lake	Lake	
Loch Gilp	Loch Gilb	Chisel lake	Lake	
Loch Goil	Loch Goill	Lowlander lake	Lake	
Loch Katrine	Loch Ceathairne/ Ceiteirein		Lake	
Loch Linnhe	An Linne Dhubh (upstream)/ Sheileach (downstream)		Lake	
Loch Lochy	Loch Lochaidh		Lake	
Loch Lomond	Loch Laomainn		Lake	
Loch Long	Loch Long	Ship lake	Lake	
Loch Lyon	Loch Lìomhann		Lake	
Loch Maree	Loch Ma-ruibhe	Lake of Saint Máel Ruba	Lake	
Loch Morar	Loch Mhòrair		Lake	
Loch Ness	Loch Nis		Lake	
Loch Ossian	Loch Oisein	Corner lake	Lake	
Loch Quoich	Loch Chuaich		Lake	
Loch Rannoch	Loch Raineach	Fern lake	Lake	
Loch Riddon	Loch Ruel		Lake	
Loch Shiel	Loch Seile	Willow lake	Lake	
Loch Shin	Loch Sìn		Lake	
Loch Tay	Loch Tatha		Lake	
Lochbuie	Locha Buidhe	Yellow lake	City	
Lochearnhead	Ceann Loch Èireann	End of Ireland Lake	City	
Lochgair	An Loch Geàrr	The short lake	City	
Lochgilphead	Ceann Loch Gilb	End of the chisel lake	City	
Lochgoilhead	Ceann Loch Goibhle	End of the prong lake	City	
Lochnagar	Beinn Chìochan	Mountain of the breasts	Mountain	
Lochranza	Loch Raonasa		City	
Lockerbie	Locarbaidh		City	
Lossiemouth	Inbhir Losaidh		City	
Lothian	Lodainn		Region	
Luing	Luinn		City	
Lumphanan	Lann Fhìonain	Church-enclosure of Saint Finnan	City	
Luncarty	Longartaidh		City	
Luss	Lus	Herb	City	
Macduff	An Dùn	The fortress	City	
Machrihanish	Machaire Shanais		City	
Mallaig	Malaig		City	
Marr	Màrr		City	Formerly Mar
Maud	Am Mòd		City	
Meigle	Mìgeil		City	
Melrose	Am Maol Ros		City	
Methven	Meadhainnigh		City	
Midlothian	Meadhan Labhdaidh/ Lodainn		County	Alternative Name County of Edinburgh or Edinburghshire
Monadhliath Mountains	Monadh Liath	Pale moor	Mountain	
Monifieth	Monadh Feith		City	
Montrose	Monadh Rois	Moor of the promontory	City	
Moray Firth	Linne Mhoireibh		Bay	
Motherwell	Tobar na Màthar		City	
Moulin	Maoilinn		City	
Mount Keen	Monadh Caoin		Mountain	
Mounth	Monadh	Moor	Mountain	
Muasdale	Muasdal		City	
Muck	Eilean nam Muc	Island of the pigs	Island	
Muirkirk	Eaglais an t-Sléibh		City	
Mull of Kintyre	Maol Chinn Tìre	Bare head of Kintyre	City	
Mullach Coire a' Chuir	Mullach Coire a' Chuir		Mountain	
Nairn	Inbhir Narann	Estuary of the River Nairn	City	
Nairnshire	Siorrachd Inbhir Narann		County	
New Deer	Achadh Reite		City	
Newcastleton	Baile a' Caisteal Nuadh		City	
Newton Mearns	Baile Ùr na Maoirne		City	
North Uist	Uibhist a Tuath		Island	
Oban	an t-Òban	The little bay	City	
Oldmeldrum	Meall Druim		City	
Orkney	Arcaibh		Region and County	
Ormsary	Ormsaraidh		City	
Otter Ferry	An Oitir	The sandbar	City	
Outer Hebrides	Na h-Eileanan Siar		Islands	
Paisley	Pàislig		City	
Partick	Pàrtaig, Pearraig		City	
Peebles	Na Pùballan	The tents	City	
Peeblesshire	Siorrachd nam Pùballan		County	
Pentland Firth	An Caol Arcach		Bay	
Perth	Peairt		City	
Perthshire	Siorrachd Pheairt		County	
Peterhead	Ceann Phàdraig, Inbhir Ùigidh		City	
Pitlochry	Baile Chloichridh		City	
Polmont	Poll-Mhonadh	Mire of the moor	City	
Polnessan	Poll an Easain	Pool of the little waterfall	City	
Port Askaig	Port Asgaig		City	
Port Bannatyne	Port MhicEamailinn		City	
Port Charlotte	Port Sgioba	Crew port	City	
Port Ellen	Port Ìlein		City	
Port Glasgow	Port Ghlaschu		City	
Port of Menteith	Port Loch Innis MoCholmaig		City	
Portavadie	Port a' Mhadaidh		City	
Portlethen	Port Leathain	Wide port	City	
Portnahaven	Port na h-Abhainne	Port of the river	City	
Portree	Port Rìgh	King port	City	
Portsoy	Port Saoidh	Sage port	City	
Prestwick	Preastabhaig		City	
Raasay	Ratharsair		Island	Also erroneously, Ratharsaigh
Rattray	Raitear		City	
Renfrew	Rinn Friù		City	
Renfrewshire	Siorrachd Rinn Friù		County	
Rhu	An Rubha	The headland	City	
Rhubodach	(An) Rubha (a’) Bhodaich	Headland of the old men	City	
River Add	Abhainn Àd		River	
River Carron, Forth	Abhainn Carrann		River	
River Carron, Sutherland	Carrann		River	
River Carron, Wester Ross	Carrann		River	
River Clyde	Abhainn Chluaidh		River	
River Dee, Aberdeenshire	Uisge Dhè	Water of God	River	
River Dee, Galloway	(Uisge) D(h)è	(Water of) God	River	
River Don	Deathan		River	
River Forth	Abhainn Dubh		River	
River Forth	Uisge For		River	
River Garry, Inverness-shire	(Abhainn) G(h)aradh		River	
River Garry, Perthshire	(Abhainn) G(h)ar		River	
River North Esk	Easg Thuath		River	
River Orchy	(Abhainn) Urchaidh		River	
River Spey	Abhainn Spè		River	
River Tay	Abhainn Tatha		River	
River Teith	Uisge Theamhich	Pleasant water	River	
River Tweed	Abhainn Tuaidh		River	
River Ury	Uaraidh, Ùraidh		River	
Rockall	Rocabarraigh	n/a	n/a	Claimed by the UK, but country ownership disputed
Rosehearty	Ros Abhartaich		City	
Rosemarkie	Ros Maircnidh		City	
Rosneath	Ros Neimhidh		City	
Ross and Cromarty	Ros agus Cromba		County	
Ross of Mull	An Ros Mhuileach		City	
Ross-shire	Siorrachd Rois		County	
Rosyth	Ros Fhìobha/ Saidhe/ Saoithe		City	
Rothes	Ràthais		City	
Rothesay	Baile Bhòid		City	
Rothienorman	Ràth Thormoid		City	
Roxburghshire	Siorrachd Rosbruig		County	
Rum	Rùm		Island	
Rutherglen	An Ruadh Ghleann	The red valley	City	
Saddell	Saghadal		City	
Salen, Ardnamurchan	An t-Sàilean		City	
Salen, Mull	An t-Sàilean		City	
Sanda Island	Sandaigh		Island	
Sandbank	An Oitir, Taigh a' Chladaich		City	
Sanquhar	An t-Seann Chathair	The old fort	City	
Scalpay, Inner Hebrides	Sgalpaigh		Island	
Scalpay, Outer Hebrides	Sgalpaigh (na Hearadh)		Island	
Scarba	Sgarba		Island	
Schiehallion	Sìdh Chailleann	Fairy hill of the Caledonians	Mountain	
Scone	Sgàin		City	
Seil	Saoil		Island	
Selkirk	Salcraig		City	
Selkirkshire	Siorrachd Shailcirc		County	
Shetland	Sealtainn		Region and County	Also known as Zetland
Shuna	Siuna		Island	
Skerryvore	Sgeir Mhòr		Island	
Skipness	Sgibinis		City	
Skye	An t-Eilean Sgitheanach	Uncertain	Island	
South Uist	Uibhist a Deas		Island	
Southend	Ceann mu Dheas		City	
St Andrews	Cill Rìmhinn		City	
St Cyrus	Eaglais Chiric		City	
St Fergus	Peit Fhearghais		City	
St Fillans	Am Port Mòr		City	
St Kilda	Hiort		Island	Name used for main island in a group
Staffa	Stafa		Island	
Stewarton	Baile nan Stiùbhartach		City	
Stirling	Sruighlea		City	
Stirlingshire	Siorrachd Shruighlea		County	
Stob an Eas	Stob an Eas		Mountain	
Stob na Boine Druim-fhinn	Stob na Boine Druim-fhinn		Mountain	
Stonehaven	Cala na Creige, Sron na h-Aibhne		City	
Stornoway	Steòrnabhagh		City	
Strachur	Srath Chura		City	
Stranraer	An t-Sròn Reamhar	The fat nose	City	
Strathclyde	Srath Chluaidh		Region	
Strathdee	Srath Dhè	Wide valley of God	City	
Strathdon	Srath Dheathain	Wide valley of the River Don	City	
Strathpeffer	Srath Pheofhair		City	
Strathlachlan	Srath Lachlainn	Lachlan's wide valley	City	
Stronachlachar	Sròn a' Chlachair	Nose of the mason	City	
Strone	An t-Sròn	The nose	City	
Succoth	An Socach		City	
Sutherland	Cataibh		County	
Tarbert	An Tairbeart	The isthmus	City	
Tarbet	An Tairbeart	The isthmus	City	
Tarfside	Bruach Tarbha		City	
Tarland	Turlann		City	
Tarves	Tarbhais		City	
Tayinloan	Taigh an Lòin	House of the wet meadow	City	
Taynuilt	Taigh an Uillt	House of the streams	City	
Tayside	Taobh Tatha		Region	
Tayvallich	Taigh a' Bhealaich	House of the mountain pass	City	
Texa	Teacsa		Island	
The Black Isle	An t-Eilean Dubh	The black island	Island	
The Cobbler	Beinn Artair		Mountain	
The Devil's Point	Bod an Deamhain	The devil's penis	Mountain	
Thornliebank	Bruach nan Dealgan		City	
Thurso	Inbhir Theòrsa		City	
Tighnabruaich	Taigh na Bruaich	House of the rim	City	
Tillicoultry	Tulach Cultraidh		City	
Tiree	Tiriodh		Island	
Tobermory	Tobar Mhoire	Mary's well	City	
Tom Molach	Tom Molach		Mountain	
Tom nan Gamhna	Tom nan Gamhna		Mountain	
Tomintoul	Tom an t-Sabhail	Hillock of the barn	City	
Tongue	Cinn Tàile, Tunga		City	
Torinturk	Tòrr an Tuirc	Mound of the boar	City	
Torphins	Tòrr Fionn		City	
Toward	Tollard		City	
Turriff	Baile Thurra, Torraibh		City	
Tyndrum	Taigh an Droma	House of the ridge	City	
Uisken	Uisgean		City	
Ullapool	Ulapul		City	
Ulva	Ulbha		City	
Ulva Ferry	Aiseag Ulbha		City	
Vatersay	Bhatarsaigh		Island	
Water of Aven	An t-Uisge Bàn		River	
Weem	Baile a' Chlachain		City	
Wemyss Bay	Bàgh nan Uaimhean	Bay of the caves	City	
West Highland Line	Rathad Iarainn nan Eilean		Railway	
West Highland Way	Slighe na Gàidhealtachd an Iar		Pass	
West Lothian	Labhdaidh/ Lodainn an Iar		County	Alternative Name County of Linlithgow or Linlithgowshire
Western Isles	Na h-Eileanan Siar		Region	
Whitehouse	An Taigh Bàn	The white house	City	
Whithorn	Taigh Mhàrtainn	Martin's house	City	
Wick	Inbhir Ùige		City	
Wigtownshire	Siorrachd Bhaile na h-Ùige		County	

=== Canada ===
Names in italics are not on Cape Breton Island, where Canadian Gaelic is still spoken. Each of the place names are in Nova Scotia, which was founded as a Scottish colony.

Canada
English	Scottish Gaelic		Place type	Notes
English	Name	Meaning	Place type	Notes
Antigonish	Am Baile Mòr	The great city		
Arisaig	Àrasaig			
Baddeck	Badaig			
Big Beach	An Tràigh Mhòr	The great shore		
Big Pond	Am Pòn Mòr			
Broad Cove	An Caolas Leathann	The wide channel		
Cape Breton Island	Eilean Cheap Breatainn	Island of Cape Britain	Island	
Christmas Island	Eilean na Nollaig	Island of Christmas		
Glendale	Bràigh na-hAibhneadh			
Giant's Lake	Loch an Fhamhair	Lake of the giant	Town	
Grand Mira North	A' Mhira Mhòr a Tuath		Town	
Grand Mira South	A' Mhira Mhòr a Deas		Town	
Grand River	Abhainn Mhòr	Great river		
Halifax	Halafacs		City	
Inverness	An Sithean			
Inverness	Baile Inbhir Nis			
Iona	Sanndraigh			
Judique	Siùdaig			
Loch Lomond	Loch Laomainn		Lake	
Mabou	An Drochaid	The bridge	Town	
Mabou	Mabù		Town	
Marion Bridge	Drochaid Mhira		Town	
New Glasgow	Am Baile Beag, Glaschu Nuadh			
Nova Scotia	Alba Nuadh			
Port Hastings	Còbh a' Phlàstair			
Port Hawkesbury	An Gut, Baile ' Chamhain			
Southwest Margaree, Inverness County, Nova Scotia	Bràigh na h-Aibhne			
St. Ann's	Baile Anna	Anne town		
Sydney	Baile Shidni	Sydney town		
Whycocomagh	Hogamah			

== Exonyms ==
The following are Scottish Gaelic placenames for places that do not use Scottish Gaelic:

=== Australia ===
Australia Àstralia
English name	Scottish Gaelic name	Notes		
English name	Scottish Gaelic name	Notes	Armidale, Armadale (Victoria and Western Australia	Armadal
Brisbane	Brisbeinn			
Broken Hill	Cnoc Briste			
Cairns	Cùirn			
Darwin	Dàrain			
Gold Coast	Oirthir Òir			
Inverell	Inbhir Eala	Derived from Scots Gaelic inver (inbhir) meaning a river's mouth and ell meaning swan		
Inverloch	Inbhir Locha			
Katherine	Catrìona			
Mackay	MacAoidh			
Melbourne	Meall Bùirn			
Mount Gambier	Sliabh Gambier			
Newcastle	An Caiteal Nuadh	Same name in Irish		
New South Wales	A' Chuimrigh Nuadh a Deas			
Northern Territory	An Ranntair a Tuath			
Orange	Orains			
Perth	Peairt	Named after Perth, Scotland		
Queensland	Tìr na Banrigh			
South Australia	Astràilia a Deas			
Sydney	Sidni			
Victoria	Bhictòria			
Tasmania	Eilean Thasman			
Western Australia	Astràilia a Iar			

=== Belgium ===
Belgium Beilg
English name	Scottish Gaelic name	Endonym		Notes
English name	Scottish Gaelic name	Name	Language	Notes
Brussels	Am Bruiseal	Bruxelles	French	

=== Canada ===
Canada
English name	Scottish Gaelic name	Endonym		Notes
English name	Scottish Gaelic name	Name	Language	Notes
Bruce County	Siorramachd Bhruis			
Calgary	Calgarraidh			
Glengary County	Siorramachd Gleanna Garadh			
Lewes	An Tuirc			
Newfoundland	Eilein a'Tosg, Talamh an Èisg			
Prince Edward Island	An t-Eilean Dearg, Eilean Eòin, Eilean a'Phrionnsa			
Stornoway	Steòrnabhagh			

=== France ===
France An Fhraing
English name	Scottish Gaelic name	Endonym		Notes
English name	Scottish Gaelic name	Name	Language	Notes
Brittany	A' Bhreatainn Bheag	Bretagne; Breizh; Bertaèyn	French; Breton; Gallo	
Paris	Paras	Paris	French	

=== Greece ===
Greece Grèig
English name	Scottish Gaelic name	Endonym		Notes
English name	Scottish Gaelic name	Name	Language	Notes
Athens	Baile na h-Àithne	Athína	Greek	

=== Ireland ===
Ireland Èirinn
English name	Scottish Gaelic name	Endonym		Notes
English name	Scottish Gaelic name	Name	Language	Notes
Dublin	Baile Àth Cliath	Baile Átha Cliath	Irish	
Galway	Baile na Gailbhinn	Gaillimh	Irish	

=== Israel ===
Israel Iosrael
English name	Scottish Gaelic name	Endonym		Notes
English name	Scottish Gaelic name	Name	Language	Notes
Jerusalem	Ierusalem	יְרוּשָׁלַיִם (Yerushaláyim) القُدس (Al-Quds)	Hebrew; Arabic	

=== Italy ===
Italy An Eadailt
English name	Scottish Gaelic name	Endonym		Notes
English name	Scottish Gaelic name	Name	Language	Notes
Rome	An Ròimh	Roma	Italian	

=== Mexico ===
Mexico Meagsago
English name	Scottish Gaelic name	Endonym		Notes
English name	Scottish Gaelic name	Name	Language	Notes
Mexico City	An Baile Mheagsago	Ciudad de México; Altepetl Mexico	Spanish; Nahuatl	

=== New Zealand ===
The southern South Island of New Zealand was settled by the Free Church of Scotland, and many of its placenames are of Scottish Gaelic origin (including some directly named for places in Scotland). The placename Strath Taieri combines the Gaelic Srath with the Māori river name Taieri and similarly, the mountain range Ben Ohau combines the Gaelic Beinn with the Māori lake name Ōhau.

New Zealand Sealainn Nuadh
English name	Scottish Gaelic name	Endonym		Notes
English name	Scottish Gaelic name	Name	Language	Notes
Balclutha	Baile Chluaidh			Means "Town on the Clutha River"
Ben Nevis	Beinn Nibheis			A mountain within Mount Richmond Forest Park
Clutha River	Cluaidh			
Clyde	Cluaidh			
Dunedin	Dùn Èideann			Named for the Gaelic name for Edinburgh
Glendhu Bay	Gleann Duibh			
Glenorchy	Gleann Urchaidh			
Huntly	Hunndaidh			
Inch Clutha	Inis Chluaidh			Island at the mouth of the Clutha River
Invercargill	Inbhir Chàrgaill			Named for Scottish-born early settler William Cargill
Kinleith	Ceann Lite			
Kinloch	Ceannloch			
Lagmhor	Lag Mhor			A settlement close to Ashburton
Lake Aviemore	an Aghaidh Mòr			
Lake Benmore	Loch Beinn Mhor			
Oban	an t-Òban			
Ulva Island	Ulbha			
Water of Leith	Uisge Lite			

=== Norway ===
Norway Nirríbhidh, Lochlann
English name	Scottish Gaelic name	Endonym		Notes
English name	Scottish Gaelic name	Name	Language	Notes
Bergen	Boirbhe	Bergen	Norwegian	

=== Spain ===
Spain An Spàinn
English name	Scottish Gaelic name	Endonym		Notes
English name	Scottish Gaelic name	Name	Language	Notes
Barcelona	Barsalòna	Barcelona	Catalan, Spanish	
Basque Country	Dùthaich nam Basgach	Euskadi; País Vasco; Pays Basque	Basque, Spanish, French	

=== Sudan ===
Sudan
English name	Scottish Gaelic name	Endonym		Notes
English name	Scottish Gaelic name	Name	Language	Notes
Khartoum	Cartùm	الخرطوم; Kaartuɔ̈m	Arabic; Dinka	

=== United Kingdom (excluding Scotland) ===
Note: most Irish and Scots Gaelic exonyms for places in Wales derive from the Welsh language.

United Kingdom Rìoghachd Aonaichte
English name	Scottish Gaelic name	Endonym		Notes
English name	Scottish Gaelic name	Name	Language	Notes
Belfast	Beul Feirste			
Berwick-upon-Tweed	Bearaig			
Cardiff	Cardiff	Cardiff; Caerdydd	English; Welsh	
Carlisle	Cathair Luail			
Channel Islands	Eileannan a'Chaolais			
Cornwall	A'Chòrn	Cornwall; Kernow	English; Cornish	
Derry	Doire Chaluim Chille			
England	Sasainn			
Gibraltar	Giobraltair			
Isle of Man	Eileann Mhanainn			
Liverpool	Poll A'Ghruthain			
London	Lunnainn			
Manchester	Manchain			
Newcastle-upon-Tyne	An Caisteal Nuadh			
Northern Ireland	Èirinn a Tuath			
Rathlin	Reachlainn, Reachra			
Oxford	Àth nan Damh			
Wales	A' Chuimrigh	Wales; Cymru	English; Welsh	Derived from Cymru
York	Eabhraig			
Yorkshire	Siorramachd Ioirc			

=== United States ===
United States Na Stàitean Aonaichte
English name	Scottish Gaelic name	Endonym		Notes
English name	Scottish Gaelic name	Name	Language	Notes
Alaska	Alasca	Alaska	English	
California	Calafòrnia	California	English, Spanish	
New Mexico	Meagsago Nuadh	New Mexico; Nuevo Mexico; Yootó Hahoodzo		
New York City	Baile Eabhraig Nuadh	New York City	English	
New York	Stàit Eabhraig Nuadh	New York State	English	

== See also ==
- Place names in Irish
- English toponymy
- Scottish toponymy
- Welsh toponymy
- Celtic toponymy
