= Clach Bheinn =

Clach Bheinn may refer to:

- Clach Bheinn (Lochgoilhead), mountain in Argyll and Bute (441m)
- Clach Bheinn (Loch Eck), mountain in Argyll and Bute, Scotland (643m)
- Clach-bheinn, mountain in Highland, Scotland (576m)
