= Càrn Glas =

Càrn Glas may refer to:

- Càrn Glas (Argyll and Bute), mountain in Scotland
- Carn Glas, chambered cairn near Inverness, Scotland

== See also ==
- Càrn Glas-choire, mountain in Highland, Scotland
