= List of Free Church of Scotland congregations =

The Free Church of Scotland has the following presbyteries and congregations:

The table below lists the congregations of the Free Church of Scotland by Presbytery, with the town or community in which the church congregation has a building or worship centre.

== Presbytery of Edinburgh and Perth ==
| Congregation | Town or City | Minister | Notes | Image |
|---|---|---|---|---|
| Bon Accord Free Church | Aberdeen | Joe Hall | founded 1905 | |
| Broughty Ferry Presbyterian Church | Broughty Ferry | Alberto de Paula | Founded in 2014 by the former minister and members of St James Church of Scotland. | |
| St Peter's Free Church | Dundee | Andy Pearson | founded 1831 | |
| Buccleuch Free Church | Edinburgh | James Ross | founded 1856 | |
| Christ Church | Edinburgh | David Court | founded 2013, as a Free Church congregation in 2015. | |
| Cornerstone Free Church | Edinburgh | Neil MacMillan | founded as a church plant in 2014. | |
| Grace Church | Leith | Athole Rennie | founded in 2011. | |
| Leith Free Church | Leith | Rev. Derek Lamont | Replanted in 2025 by Rev. Derek Lamont | |
| St Columba's Free Church | Edinburgh | Rev Dr Cory Brock | founded in 1843 as Free St John's | |
| Falkirk Free Church | Falkirk | David Randall | founded in 1991 | |
| Kirkcaldy Free Church | Kirkcaldy | John Johnstone | founded circa 1900 | |
| Dunfermline Free Church | Dunfermline | Rev. Andrew Macleod | | |
| Livingston Free Church | Livingston | Nigel Anderson | | |
| London City Presbyterian Church | London | Rev. Andy Longwe & Rev. Kevin Arévalo (assistant) | Founded as a mission in 1949, as a Free Church congregation in 1954. Currently meets at St Botolph's, Aldersgate, Church of England. The only Free Church of Scotland congregation not located in Scotland. | |
| Knox Church | Perth | Paul Gibson | | |
| St Andrews Free Church | St Andrews | Paul Clarke | Meets at St Andrews Baptist Church (am) and Hope Park Church of Scotland (pm). Founded as a church plant in c. 2003. | |
| Grace Church Montrose | Montrose | Ciarán Kelleher | Founded in 2015, largely as a breakaway from local Church of Scotland congregations. | |

== Presbytery of Glasgow and Argyll ==
| Congregation | Town or City | Minister | Notes | Image |
|---|---|---|---|---|
| Abbeygreen Free Church | Lesmahagow | vacant | Founded in 1843. Became a United Free Church of Scotland congregation in 1900 and later a Church of Scotland congregation. Departed the Church of Scotland and was subsequently re-admitted to the Free Church on 31 March 2020. | |
| Arran Brodick Free Church | Brodick | Benjamin van Rensburg (caretaker) | | |
| Arran Shiskine Free Church | Shiskine | Benjamin van Rensburg (caretaker) | | |
| Ayr Free Church | Ayr | Rory Stott | Founded 1904 | |
| Bishopbriggs Free Church | Bishopbriggs | Eric Mackay (caretaker) | | |
| Campbeltown Free Church | Campbeltown | Finlay Mackenzie (caretaker) | | |
| Hope Church | Blackwood and Kirkmuirhill | Ian Watson | Founded 2014 | |
| Hope Church | Coatbridge | Ivor MacDonald | | |
| Cumbernauld Free Church | Cumbernauld | Andrew Longwe | Founded in 1965, full congregational status in 1974. | |
| Dumbarton Free High Church | Dumbarton | Kenny Boyd (caretaker) | Founded 1908. | |
| Dumfries Free Church | Dumfries | Trevor Kane | | |
| Dunblane Free Church | Dunblane | Allan Shearer | | |
| West Mains Free Church | East Kilbride | Iain Thomson | Founded in 1957, full congregational status in 1962. | |
| Dowanvale Free Church | Partick | Kenny Macleod and Iain Morrison (Asst.) | | |
| Govanhill Free Church | Govanhill | Kenny Boyd | | |
| Partick Free Church | Partick | Alex Cowie | | |
| Glasgow City Free Church | Glasgow | Dr. Colin Dow (Minister), Phil Stogner (Associate Minister) | Founded in 1994 on the merger of St Vincent Street and Milton Free Churches. Prior to being named Glasgow City Free Church, the congregation was named St Vincent Street Church / St Vincent Street Free Church. 24 October 2021: Due to maintenance and health and safety problems with the rented property on St Vincent street, the congregation is now meeting in the buildings of Partick Free Church, 29 Crow Road, Partick, G11 7RT | |
| Govan Free Church | | | Founded 2013 | |
| Greenock Free Church | Greenock | Rev Iain Thomson | | |
| Dunoon and Strachur Free Church | | | | |
| Lennoxtown Free Church | | | | |
| Lochgilphead and Tarbert Free Church | | | | |
| Mull and Coll Free Church | | | | |
| Covenant Church | Newmilns | Rev. Benjamin Wilks | Accepted as a Free Church congregation in 2015. | |
| Oban Free Church | | | | |
| Stirling Free Church | | | Founded as a church plant in 2013. | |

== Presbytery of Inverness, Lochaber and Ross ==
| Congregation | Town or City | Minister | Notes | Image |
|---|---|---|---|---|
| Badenoch Free Church | Kingussie | | | |
| Burghead Free Church | Burghead | éurnbull | | |
| Dingwall and Strathpeffer Free Church | Dingwall | Rev. Matty Guy | The church building opened for worship in 1870. | |
| Elgin and Forres Free Church | Elgin | Peter Turnbull | | |
| Fortrose Free Church of Scotland | Fortrose | Rev. Rory Stott | | |
| Fort William and Kilmonivaig Free Church | Fort William | | | |
| Glenurquhart Free Church | Drumnadrochit | Rev. Sean Ankers | | |
| Free North Church, Inverness | Inverness | Rev. Angus MacRae | | |
| Merkinch Free Church, Inverness | Inverness | Rev. Chris Davidson | | |
| Greyfriars Free Church | Inverness | Rev. Ian Macritchie | | |
| Kilmallie and Ardnamurchan Free Church | Caol | Rev. Euan Dodds | | |
| Kiltarlity Free Church | Kiltarlity | Rev. Stephen Allison | | |
| Kiltearn Free Church | Evanton | | | |
| Knockbain Free Church | North Kessock | | | |
| Maryburgh and Killearnan Free Church | Maryburgh | Alec Stewart | | |
| Urquhart (Ferintosh) and Resolis Free Church | Urquhart | Rev. Calum Iain Macleod | | |
| Smithton Free Church | Culloden | Rev. Alasdair Macleod | | |
| Nairn Free Church | Nairn | | | |
| Tornagrain Community Church | Tornagrain | Innes McSween | | |
| Urray and Strathconon Free Church | Muir of Ord | | | |

== Northern Presbytery ==
| Congregation | Town | Minister | Notes | Image |
|---|---|---|---|---|
| Assynt Free Church | Lochinver | Ian Allan (caretaker) | | |
| Clyne Free Church | Brora | Roddy MacRae (caretaker) | | |
| Dornoch Free Church | Dornoch | Duncan Macleod | | |
| Golspie Free Church | Golspie | Eric Paterson | | |
| Helmsdale and Kinbrace Free Church | Helmsdale | Rev. Roddy MacRae | Founded 1843. | |
| Bonar Bridge and Lairg Free Church | Lairg, Bonar Bridge, Migdale and Rosehall | John Forbes | | |
| Lybster, Bruan, Latheron and Berriedale Free Church | Lybster | Jim Morrison | | |
| Castletown and Community Free Church | Castletown | | | |
| Rogart Free Church | Pittentrail | Ian Allan | | |
| Rosskeen Free Church | By Achnagarron | Rev. Calum MacMillan | | |
| Tain and Fearn Free Church | Tain | Rev. Alasdair MacAulay | Founded 1906 to 1910. | |
| Thurso and North Coast Free Church | Thurso | Rev. Jerry Taylor | | |
| Wick and Keiss Free Church | Wick | | | |

== Presbytery of Skye and Wester Ross ==
| Congregation | Town | Minister | Notes | Image |
|---|---|---|---|---|
| Applecross Free Church | Camusterrach | Rev. Marcos Florit | | |
| Bracadale Free Church | Carbost, Loch Harport and Struan | | | |
| Duirinish Free Church | Glendale, Dunvegan and Waternish | | | |
| Gairloch and Kinlochewe Free Church | Gairloch, Kinlochewe and Torridon | | | |
| Glenelg and Arnisdale, Lochalsh and Glenshiel Free Church | Glenelg, Inverinate | Rev. James Blackwell | | |
| Trotternish Free Church | | Rev. Nigel Anderson | | |
| Lochbroom and Coigach Free Church | Achiltibuie and Ullapool | Rev. Neil Lachlan Macdonald | | |
| Lochcarron and Applecross Free Church | Applecross and Lochcarron | Rev. Colin Macleod | | |
| Plockton and Kyle Free Church | Kyle of Lochalsh | Rev. Roddie M. Rankin | | |
| Poolewe and Aultbea Free Church | Aultbea, Poolewe | Rev. Dan Paterson | Known as Lochewe Community Church | |
| Portree Free Church | Portree | Rev. Donnie G. MacDonald | | |
| Raasay Free Church | Raasay | | | |
| Sleat and Strath Free Church | | | | |

== Western Isles Presbytery ==
| Congregation | Town | Minister | Notes | Image |
|---|---|---|---|---|
| Back Free Church | Vatisker | Colin Macleod | | |
| Barvas Free Church | Barvas | Murdo Campbell | | |
| Callanish Free Church | Callanish | Calum Macdonald | | |
| Carloway Free Church | Carloway | Thomas Davis | | |
| Cross Free Church | Cross, Ness | Ewen Matheson | | |
| Garrabost Free Church | Garrabost | Iain Thomson | | |
| South Harris Free Church | Leverburgh | Mark A. Macleod | | |
| Kinloch Free Church | Laxay | Paul Murray | | |
| Lochs Free Church | Crossbost | Calum Iain Macleod | Founded 1843 | |
| North Harris Free Church | Tarbert | David Macleod | Founded in 2014 by departing members of the Tarbert Church of Scotland. | |
| North Tolsta Free Church | North Tolsta | Donald M. Macleod | | |
| North Uist, Grimsay and Berneray Free Church | Carinish | Vacant | | |
| Pairc Free Church | Gravir | Vacant | | |
| Scalpay Free Church | Scalpay | Andrew Coghill | Meets in the local Church of Scotland building. | |
| Shawbost Free Church | Shawbost | Vacant | | |
| South Uist and Benbecula Free Church | Lochboisdale | Vacant | | |
| Stornoway Free Church | Stornoway | James MacIver and Calum M. Smith (assistant) | Founded as the Gaelic Free Church, Stornoway in 1843. | |
| High Free Church | Stornoway | Hugh Ferrier | Meets at Stornoway Primary School. Founded 2014. | |
| Stornoway Seminary | Stornoway | James MacIver | All services are in Gaelic. | |
| Tong Free Church | Tong | Vacant | | |

== Former churches ==
| Congregation | Town | Notable ministers | Notes | Image |
|---|---|---|---|---|
| Bennecarrigan Free Church | Kilmory | | Church built in 1893. Closed 2009. | |
| Knock Free Church | Garrabost | | Congregation united with Point Free Church 2017 to become Garrabost Free Church. | |

Congregational history

- Abbeygreen (Lesmahagow). Joined from the Church of Scotland in 2020.
- Aberdeen (Bon Accord). The minority that remained in the Free Church were in 1907 allocated the old St Columba's building on Dee Street. In 1977 they moved to the old Bon Accord Free Church building. A minority left to found Aberdeen FCC in 2000.
- Acharacle. The building was allocated to the Free Church in 1905. It has since closed.
- Alvie. The building was allocated to the Free Church in 1905. It has since closed.
- Applecross (Camusterrach)
- Arisaig. The building was allocated to the Free Church in 1905. It has since closed.
- Arran (Brodick) and Arran (Shiskine). Of the island's seven Free Churches, six remained in the Free Church in 1900, retaining the buildings in Brodick, Kilmory, Shiskine and Whiting Bay. This has been reduced to two. A minority (not the minister - the charge was vacant) left to found Arran FCC in 2000. Bennecarrigan Free Church in Kilmory closed in 2009.
- Assynt (Lochinver) and Stoer. The ministers of Assynt and Stoer joined the UFC in 1900 and those who remained had no settled pastor until 1942 and 1920 respectively, although the Assynt building in Lochinver was retained. Assynt and Stoer were united in 1962. A minority left to found Assynt FCC in 2000.
- Ayr. A minority left in 2000 to found Ayr FCC.
- Back (Vatisker). Building retained post 1900.
- Badenoch (Kingussie). Of the two Free Church places of worship in Kingussie in 1900 one was retained.
- Barvas. Building retained post 1900.
- Bernera near Lewis. Of the two Free Church places of worship in 1900 one was retained. It has since closed.
- Bishopbriggs
- Blackwood and Kirkmuirhill: Hope Church
- Bonar Bridge and Lairg (and Migdale and Rosehall). The buildings in Creich/Bonar, Lairg and Rosehall were all retained post 1900.
- Bower. The building was allocated to the Free Church in 1905. It has since closed.
- Bracadale (Carbost, Loch Harport and Struan). The minister joined the UFC in 1900 and those who remained had no settled pastor until 1930. The minister left to found Bracadale FCC in 2000.
- Broadford. The minister left to found Broadford FCC in 2000.
- Broughty Ferry
- Burghead
- Callanish
- Campbeltown
- Carloway. The building was retained post 1900.
- Castletown (and Community)
- Clyne (Brora). The building was retained post 1900. The charge was vacant in 1900 and the first Free Church minister was settled in 1902. A minority left to found Brora FCC in 2000.
- Coatbridge: Hope Church. The Coatbridge West building was retained post 1900.
- Contin. The building was allocated to the Free Church in 1905. It has since closed.
- Cross/Ness. The building was retained in 1900, but the minister joined the UFC and those who remained had no settled pastor until 1909. A minority (not the minister - the charge was vacant) left to found Cross FCC in 2000.
- Croick. The building was allocated to the Free Church in 1905. It has since closed.
- Cumbernauld
- Daviot. The building was allocated to the Free Church in 1905. It has since closed.
- Dingwall (and Strathpeffer). The buildings in both Dingwall and Strathpeffer-Fodderty were retained post 1900.
- Dornoch. The building was allocated to the Free Church in 1905. A minority left to found Dornoch FCC in 2000.
- Dumbarton. A minority left to found Dumbarton FCC in 2000.
- Dumfries. The minister left to found Dumfries FCC in 2000.
- Duirinish (Glendale, Dunvegan and Waternish). The church was vacant in 1900 and the first Free Church minister was settled in 1908. A minority left to found Duirinish FCC in 2000.
- Dunblane
- Dundee: St Peter's. The Dundee St Stephen's building was retained post 1900.
- Dunfermline
- Dunoon and Strachur
- Duthil, Moy, Dores, Stratherrick and Daviot. Duthil Free Church building was retained post 1900. The charge was vacant in 1900 and the first Free Church minister was settled in 1910. The minister of Moy was one of the twenty-six who remained in the Free Church in 1900, and the building was retained. Duthil and Moy were united in 1951. The Stratherrick minister joined the UFC in 1900 but the Daviot minister remained, along with the Daviot building. Stratherrick and Daviot were united in 1932. In 1972 there was a triple union of Dores, Stratherrick-Daviot and Duthil-Moy, known as Duthil-Dores. The minister left to found Duthil-Dores FCC in 2000.
- East Kilbride (West Mains). Founded as mission from Govanhill Free Church in 1956. A minority left to found East Kilbride FCC in 2000.
- Eddrachillis. A minority remained in the Free Church in 1900, retaining the building. The charge was linked with Rogart in 1981. The minister left to found Eddrachillis FCC in 2000.
- Edinburgh: Buccleuch. The building of Edinburgh Buccleuch-Greyfriars Free Church was allocated to the Free Church in 1905.
- Edinburgh: Christ Church
- Edinburgh: Cornerstone
- Edinburgh: Leith. The building of Leith Elder Memorial Free Church was retained post 1900.
- Edinburgh: Leith Grace Church
- Edinburgh St Columba's. The minority who remained in the Free Church were in 1907 allocated the former St John's building (which also served as the Assembly Hall). The minister? left to found Edinburgh FCC in 2000.
- Elgin (and Forres). Of Forres Cumming Street Free Church's two places of worship in 1900 one was retained. It closed in ?.
- Falkirk
- Farr. The building was allocated to the Free Church in 1905. It has since closed.
- Fort Augustus. The building was allocated to the Free Church in 1905. It has since closed.
- Fort William (and Kilmonivaig)
- Fortrose
- Gairloch and Kinlochewe (and Torridon). The Gairloch building was retained post 1900.
- Garrabost. The minister of Knock Free Church joined the UFC in 1900 but many of the congregation remained, as did the building. Point was disjoined from Knock as a separate charge in 1963. Minorities in both churches left to found Knock and Point FCCs in 2000. The two charges were reunited to form Garrabost Free Church in 2011.
- Glasgow Briton Street. Formed by the union (post-1900) of Glasgow Duke Street Gaelic and Glasgow Govan St Columba's. A minority left to found Briton Street FCC in 2000. The Duke Street building was retained post 1900.
- Glasgow City. Formed by the union (1994) of Glasgow St Vincent Street and Glasgow Milton. The Milton building was retained post 1900.
- Glasgow Cranstonhill. The building was allocated to the Free Church in 1905. It has since closed.
- Glasgow Govan
- Glasgow Govanhill
- Glasgow Hope Street. The building was allocated to the Free Church in 1905. It has since closed.
- Glasgow Partick. The minister joined the UFC in 1900 and those who remained had no settled pastor until 1906. The minister left to found Partick FCC in 2000.
- Glasgow Partick Dowanvale
- Glasgow Partick Highland. Sanctioned by the Free Church in 1924. A minority left to found Partick Highland FCC in 2000.
- Glasgow Shettleston. A minority of Carntyne Free Church remained in the Free Church in 1900. ?2000?
- Glenelg, Arnisdale, Lochalsh and Glenshiel (Glenelg and Inverinate). In Glenelg the minister joined the UFC in 1900, but the building was retained; those who remained had no settled pastor until 1922. A minority left to found Glenelg and Arnisdale FCC in 2000. The ministers and buildings of both Lochalsh and Glenshiel remained in the Free Church in 1900. The two charges were united in 1968. The minister left to found Lochalsh and Glenshiel FCC in 2000. The current charge was formed by a union in ?.
- Glenorchy. The building was allocated to the Free Church in 1905. It has since closed.
- Glenurquhart (Drumnadrochit)
- Golspie. The building was allocated to the Free Church in 1905.
- Greenock. The Greenock Gaelic building was retained post 1900.
- Harris or South Harris (Leverburgh). The minister joined the UFC in 1900 and those who remained had no settled pastor until 1923. The minister left to found Harris FCC in 2000.
- Helmsdale (and Kinbrace). The Helmsdale building was retained post 1900.
- Inverness Greyfriars. The minister of Inverness Free Presbyterian Church left in 1938 to found an independent church. Much of this church, retaining the building, became Greyfriars Free Church in 1958. The minister left to found Greyfriars FCC in 2000.
- Inverness Merkinch
- Inverness North. The building was retained post 1900.
- Kilbrandon. The building was allocated to the Free Church in 1905. It has since closed.
- Kildalton and Oa. The building was allocated to the Free Church in 1905. It has since closed.
- Kilmallie and Ardnamurchan (Caol). The Kilmallie building was retained post 1900.
- Kilmorack and Strathglass (Beauly). The minister joined the UFC in 1900 and those who remained had no settled pastor until 1925. The minister left to found Kilmorack and Strathglass FCC in 2000.
- Kilmuir and Stenscholl. The Kilmuir building was retained post 1900. The minister left to found Kilmuir and Stenscholl FCC in 2000.
- Kilmuir Easter. The building was allocated to the Free Church in 1905. It has since closed.
- Kilninver. Of the two Free Church places of worship in 1900 one was retained. It has since closed.
- Kiltarlity
- Kiltearn (Evanton). The building was retained post 1900. A minority left to found Kiltearn FCC in 2000.
- Kincardine. The building was allocated to the Free Church in 1905. It has since closed.
- Kinglassie. The building was allocated to the Free Church in 1905. It has since closed.
- Kinloch (Laxay). The building was retained post 1900.
- Kirkcaldy
- Knockbain (North Kessock). The Knockbain West building was allocated to the Free Church in 1905.
- Kyle of Lochalsh (and Plockton). The Kyle building was retained post 1900.
- Lairg and Rosehall. The buildings in both parishes were retained post 1900. A minority left to found Lairg and Rosehall FCC in 2000.
- Lennoxtown
- Livingston
- Lochbroom and Coigach (Ullapool and Achiltibuie). The Coigach building was retained post 1900.
- Lochcarron (and Applecross?). The Lochcarron building was retained post 1900. The minister left to found Lochcarron FCC in 2000.
- Lochgilphead and Tarbert
- Lochs (Crossbost). Building retained post 1900.
- London
- Lybster (and Bruan, Latheron and Berriedale). The buildings in Berriedale, Bruan and Lybster were retained post 1900. A minority left to found Lybster, Bruan, Latheron and Berriedale FCC in 2000.
- Maryburgh (and Killearnan). The Killearnan building was retained post 1900.
- Montrose: Grace Church
- Mull and Coll
- Nairn
- Newmilns: Covenant Church
- North Harris (Tarbert)
- North Tolsta
- North Uist, Grimsay and Berneray (Carinish). The minister in 1900 joined the UFC and those who remained had no settled pastor until 1912. The minister left to found North Uist and Grimsay FCC in 2000.
- Oban
- Pairc (Gravir)
- Paisley. Founded as a mission from Govan Free Church in 1961. The minister left to found Paisley FCC in 2000.
- Perth: Knox
- Poolewe and Aultbea. The minister in 1900 joined the UFC and those who remained had no settled pastor until 1914. The building in Aultbea was retained in 1905. A minority left to found Poolewe and Aultbea FCC in 2000.
- Portree. The minister in 1900 joined the UFC and those who remained had no settled pastor until 1923. The minister left to found Portree FCC in 2000.
- Raasay
- Rogart (Pittentrail). The charge was linked with Eddrachillis in 1981. The minister left to found Eddrachillis FCC in 2000.
- Rosskeen (Achnagarron)
- Rothesay. Some who had left the Free Church in 1892 after the Declaratory Act and formed into a church were readmitted after its repeal in 1905. Services ceased in 1997.
- St Andrews
- Scalpay near Harris. Joined the Free Church from the UFC in 1929. A minority (not the minister - the charge was vacant) left to found Scalpay Harris FCC in 2000.
- Shawbost (Bragar). A minority (not the minister - the charge was vacant) left to found Shawbost FCC in 2000.
- Sleat and Strath
- Smithton (Culloden)
- South Uist and Benbecula (Lochboisdale).
- Snizort. The minister in 1900 joined the UFC and the first Free Church pastor was settled in 1906. The minister left to found Snizort FCC in 2000.
- Stirling
- Stornoway. The minister in 1900 joined the UFC and the first Free Church pastor was settled in 1906. A minority left to found Stornoway FCC in 2000.
- Stornoway High
- Stornoway Seminary
- Strath. The minister joined the UFC in 1900 and those who remained had no settled pastor until 1922. A minority left to found Strath FCC in 2000.
- Tain (and Fearn). The Fearn building was retained post 1900.
- Tarbat (Portmahomack). The minister left to found Tarbat FCC in 2000.
- Tayvallich. Of the two Free Church places of worship in 1900 one was retained. It has since closed.
- Thurso (and North Coast).
- Tong
- Tornagrain
- Trotternish
- Urquhart (Ferintosh) and Resolis
- Urray and Strathconon (Muir of Ord)
- Wick (and Keiss). The Keiss building was retained post 1900.
