= Argyll's Bowling Green =

Peninsula in Argyll and Bute, Scotland

Coordinates: 56.139°N 4.856°W

Argyll's Bowling Green (Scottish Gaelic: Baile na Grèine meaning "sunny hamlet" or "sunny cattle fold"), also known as the Ardgoil peninsula, is an area on the Ardgoil estate in Argyll and Bute, Scotland.

== Description ==
The area includes the most southerly part of the Arrochar Alps and lies between Loch Goil and Loch Long. It is part of the Argyll Forest Park and is within Loch Lomond and The Trossachs National Park.

The name is marked on James Dorret's 1750 General Map of Scotland and Islands thereto belonging. In the 1834–1845 account by Rev John McDougal, minister of the area, he describes how people going to the low country (south) had to climb the “Duke of Argyle’s bowling green”. This was part of a route called the “Duke's Path” which started on the shore of Loch Goil and ended at a place called Mark on the shore of Loch Long where you crossed the loch by boat.

The name is an anglicisation of the Gaelic, which may be consciously humorous, as there is very little flat land. The name originally referred to a small grazing ground on the south east side of the peninsula above Mark (grid reference NS229951) but is sometimes used to describe the peninsula.

The mountains of the peninsula include:

- Ben Donich 847m
- The Brack 787m
- Cnoc Coinnich 761m
- Beinn Reithe 653m
- The Saddle 521m
- Clach Bheinn 441m
- Tom Molach 370m
- Càrn Glas 502m
- Tom nan Gamhna 389m
- The Steeple 390m
