= Ardgoil =

Publicly Owned Estate in Argyll & Bute, Scotland

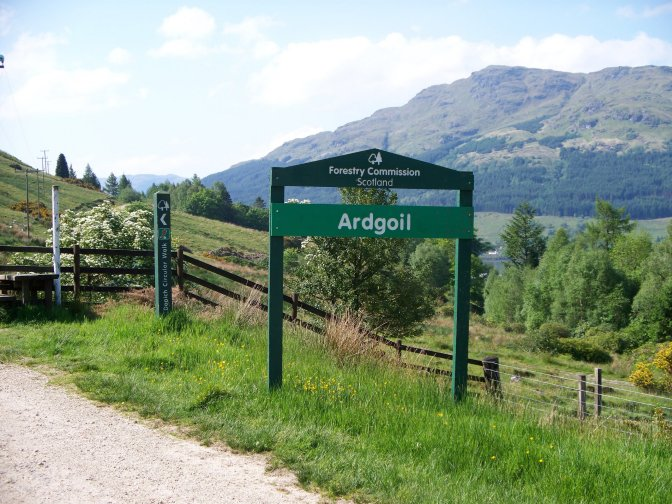
Ardgoil estate notice.

Ardgoil is an estate in Argyll & Bute, Scotland. It is part of the Argyll forest park and is within the Loch Lomond and the Trossachs National Park. The Ardgoil estate is managed as part of the Argyll forest park by Forestry Commission Scotland. The Ardgoil estate is publicly owned land with the land title held for the public by the ministers of the Scottish Parliament. In the past the Ardgoil estate was also known as the city of Glasgow's Highland estate.

== History ==
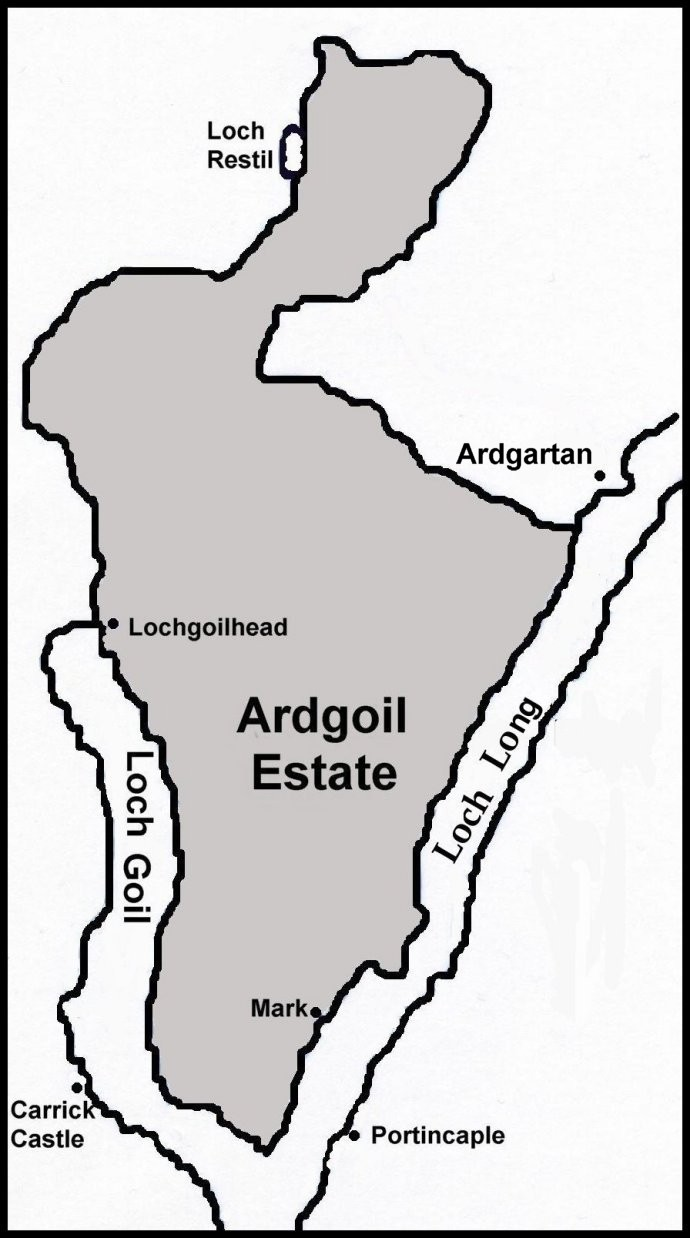
Map of Ardgoil estate.

The story of the Ardgoil estate begins in 1905 when another land estate in Argyll & Bute was put up for sale. In April 1905 the Ardkinglas estate was put up for sale. The estate was offered as one lot, but if not sold, it would be offered as two sections called the "Loch Fyne Section" and the "Loch Goil & Loch Long Section". There was no offer for the whole estate, and the Liberal Party politician Archibald Cameron Corbett arranged to purchase the "Loch Goil & Loch Long Section". Corbett was the Member of Parliament for Glasgow Tradeston at the time, and he made the purchase with the aim of giving it to the city of Glasgow. In July 1905, Corbett sent a letter to the Lord Provost of Glasgow at the time, Sir John Ure Primrose, informing him of the purchase. A copy of Corbett's letter is shown below. The size of the land purchased was 9,360 acres (3,790 ha).

New Club, Glasgow, 28th July 1905

My Dear Lord Provost,

I have just agreed to purchase a part of the Ardkinglas estate with the object of handing over the three sheep farms lying between Loch Long and Loch Goil to the Corporation of Glasgow. The extent of the land is about 9,000 acres (36 km^{2}). As it is not possible in many cases for the public to have access to mountains in this neighbourhood, it seems to me desirable that our fellow-citizens should have a mountain territory which will be their own for all time. My usual clause against the sale of liquor would be a condition of the conveyance. I should also make it a condition that the revenue derived from the property should be diverted to the purpose of making it more accessible to our citizens, whether by ferry or other means. My general object is to preserve a grand and rugged region for the best use of those who love the freedom of the mountains and wild natural beauty. While I would not object to the erection of simple cottages, I should greatly repel anything being done which would disturb the naturalness of such scenery, and would suggest that our artists might be consulted before any step affecting its aspect be taken. While I make the two restrictions and one earnest suggestion, I trust that none of these will be felt by the Corporation to interfere in an undesirable way with their freedom to do their best for the citizens, or to imply any limitation of the heartiness with which I appreciate your own and their public services.

Yours sincerely
A. Cameron Corbett

The gift was accepted and for the moment the land was called the Ardkinglas property. The Corporation of Glasgow arranged an official inspection of the Ardkinglas property on Saturday 7 October 1905. The Ardkinglas property consisted of 9,360 acres (37.9 km^{2}) of mountain territory lying between Loch Long and Loch Goil. It is a triangular piece of land 6 miles (9.7 km) in length and around 3 miles (4.8 km) at its widest point. An area called Argyll's Bowling Green is part of the estate. Three farms were included in the gift and they are Beach, Coilessan and Lochgoilhead. In November 1905 Corbett contacted the Lord Provost stating that he wanted to add some more land to the gift. He proposed adding the farm of Pole near Lochgoilhead, which was 5,380 acres (2,180 ha) in size. The additional gift was accepted and this brought the Ardkinglas property to 14,740 acres (5,970 ha) in size. Mr Corbett said he did not want the name of the property to be in any way connected with him, so the Corporation of Glasgow decided to call the Ardkinglas property "Ardgoil". The land was legally transferred to the Corporation of Glasgow in June 1906. In December 1911, under the Private Legislation Procedure (Scotland) act 1899, the Corporation of Glasgow were given the power to allow them to appropriate estate land for afforestation, construct roads, bridges, piers and ferries for the utilisation and development of the estate. They were also given the power to sell, feu and lease the estate or portions of the estate.

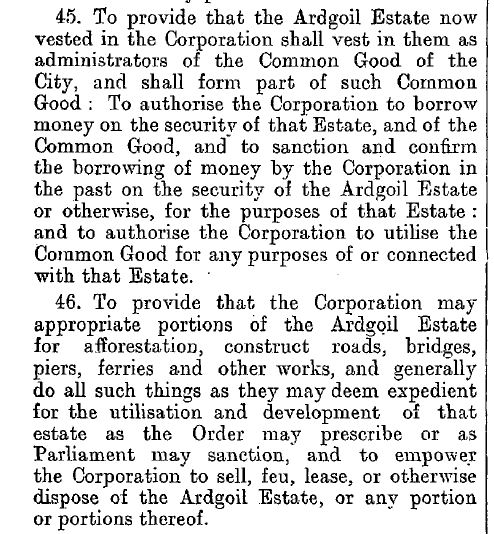
Private Legislation Procedure (Scotland) act 1899 (Clipping of Edinburgh Gazette 17 November 1911)

Between 1928 and 1929, the Corporation of Glasgow made a feu agreement with the Forestry Commission for two sections of the Ardgoil estate to be used for afforestation purposes. These sections were to be called "Pole" and "Coilessan". The Pole section consisted of 2,854 acres (1,155 ha) and the Coilessan section consisted of 4,794 acres (1,940 ha). In 1965 the Corporation of Glasgow made arrangements to transfer the Ardgoil estate into public ownership at an agreed price to the tax payer of £156,450. It was to be managed by the Forestry Commission as part of the Argyll forest park. The Corporation of Glasgow included three main conditions/burdens on the sale of the Ardgoil Estate. These were:

(One) The lands shall be used by the Forestry Commission for their functions under the Forestry Act 1967 and for no other purpose whatsoever unless with written consent from the Corporation of Glasgow.

(Two) The feuars shall be obliged to comply with the conditions of the said Deed of Gift in so far as it is possible and practicable for them to do so to ensure that the basic objects attaching to the said Deed of Gift shall be observed.

(Three) The lands will remain as part of Argyll Forest Park.

In August 1967 the Ardgoil estate land title was transferred to the Secretary of State for Scotland and into public ownership. In 1999 all land titles (including the Ardgoil estate) held by the Secretary of State for Scotland were transferred to the ministers of the new Scottish Parliament.

Since the Forestry Commission took over the management of the Ardgoil Estate, it has made 55 disposals of Ardgoil estate land amounting to 2,368 acres (958 ha). The most recent was 3.68 acres (1.49 ha) in 2009 to Dunbritton Housing Association for the price of £115,000. The total size of the Ardgoil Estate is 14,740 acres (5,970 ha). This means around 16% of the Ardgoil estate has been sold yet the lands were to remain as part of the Argyll Forest Park.

== See also ==
- Argyll's Bowling Green
