= Dùn a' Choin Duibh =

Architectural structure in Argyll and Bute, Scotland

Coordinates: 55°49′13″N 5°30′20″W

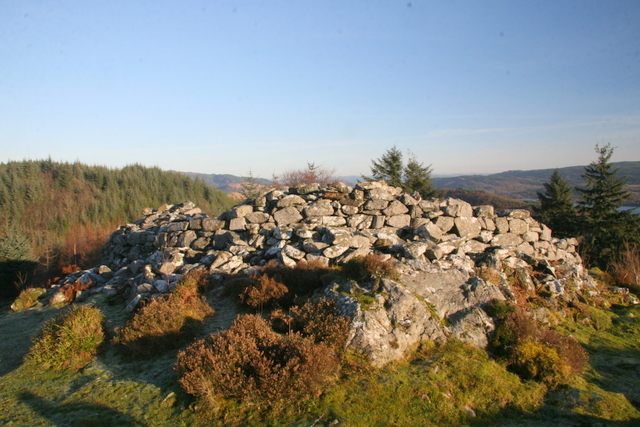

Dùn a' Choin Duibh (Scottish Gaelic: Fort of the Black Dog) is a hillfort located near Torinturk, Argyll and Bute, Scotland. According to the local shanachies, the fort is named after a black wolfhound which was half wolf, which defended the fort. The fort provides views to the Inner Hebridean islands of Gigha, Islay and Jura and further to the Mull of Kintyre and Ireland.
