= The Saddle (Lochgoilhead) =

Hill near Lochgoilhead, in Argyll and Bute, Scotland

Coordinates: 56°7′56″N 4°51′21″W

The Saddle is a mountain near Lochgoilhead in The Ardgoil Peninsula in Argyll. It reaches a height of 520.6m and is in the Arrochar Alps.
