= The Steeple (Lochgoilhead) =

Hill near Lochgoilhead, in Argyll and Bute, Scotland

Coordinates: 56°10′3″N 4°53′0″W

The Steeple is a small hill in the Ardgoil Peninsula and Arrochar Alps behind the village of Lochgoilhead within Loch Lomond and the Trossachs National Park. The peak reaches a height of 382 m.
