= Carn Glas =

Burial site in Highland, Scotland

Coordinates: 57.415041°N 4.250019°W

Carn Glas is a Neolithic chambered cairn burial site near Inverness in Scotland.

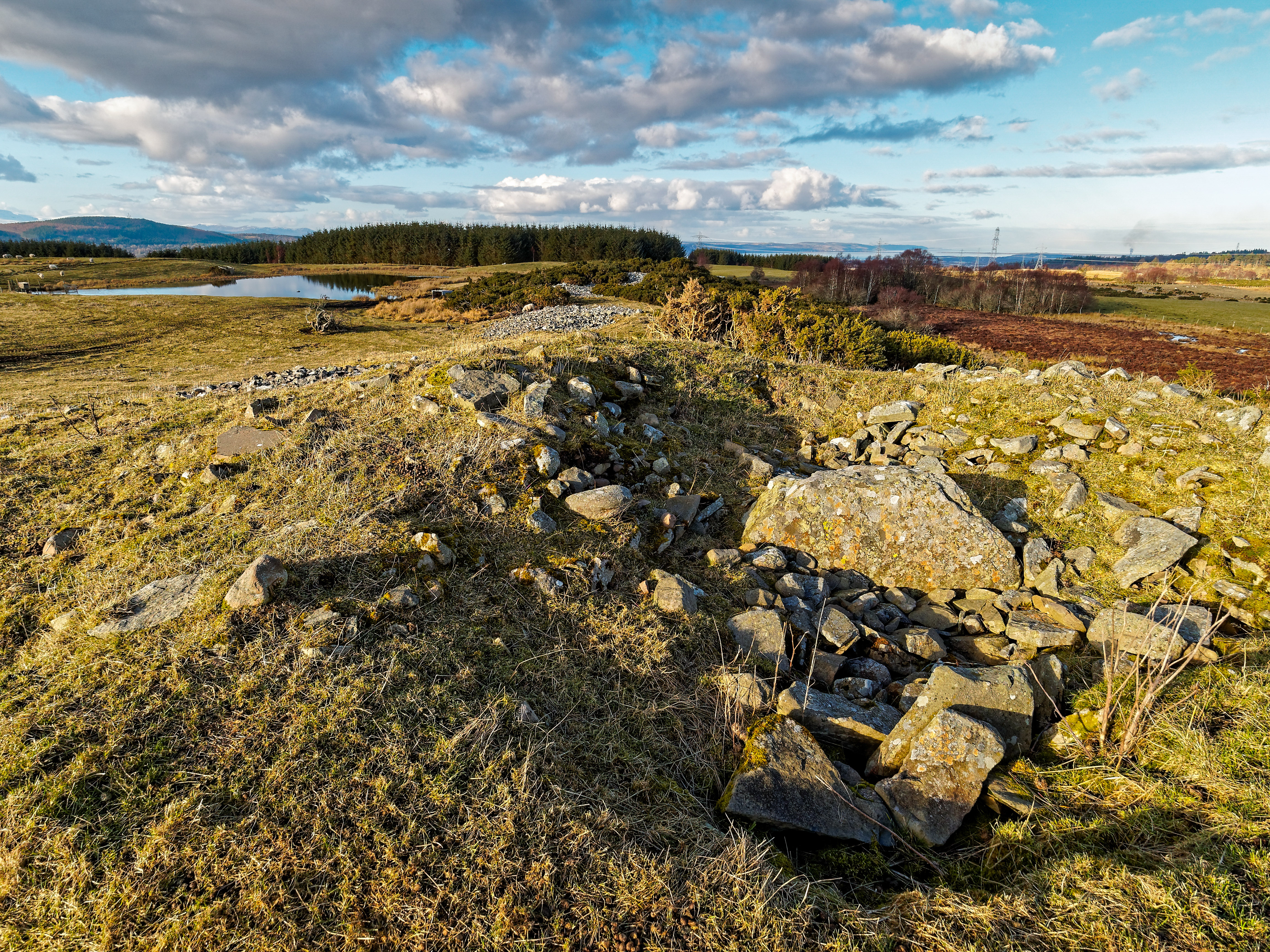

The site is to the south-east of Achvraid on Essich Moor and consists of three linked cairns on a ridge. The burial site is 116 metres (381 ft) long, and is the longest known chambered cairn in Scotland.

It was designated as a scheduled monument in 1964.

Other significant sites found nearby are a stone circle at Torbreck and a chambered cairn at Culduthel.
