= Kirkmichael =

Kirkmichael may refer to:

- Kirkmichael, Dumfries and Galloway, Scotland
- Kirkmichael, Moray, Scotland
- Kirkmichael, Perth and Kinross, Scotland
- Kirkmichael, South Ayrshire, Scotland
- Kirk Michael, Isle of Man
