= Tom nan Gamhna =

Coordinates: 56°9′57″N 4°52′36″W

Tom nan Gamhna is a 389-metre tall mountain within the Ardgoil Peninsula and Arrochar Alps near Lochgoilhead in Argyll, Scottish Highlands.
