= Clach-bheinn =

Mountain in Highland area of Scotland

Coordinates: 57.24178°N 4.85524°W

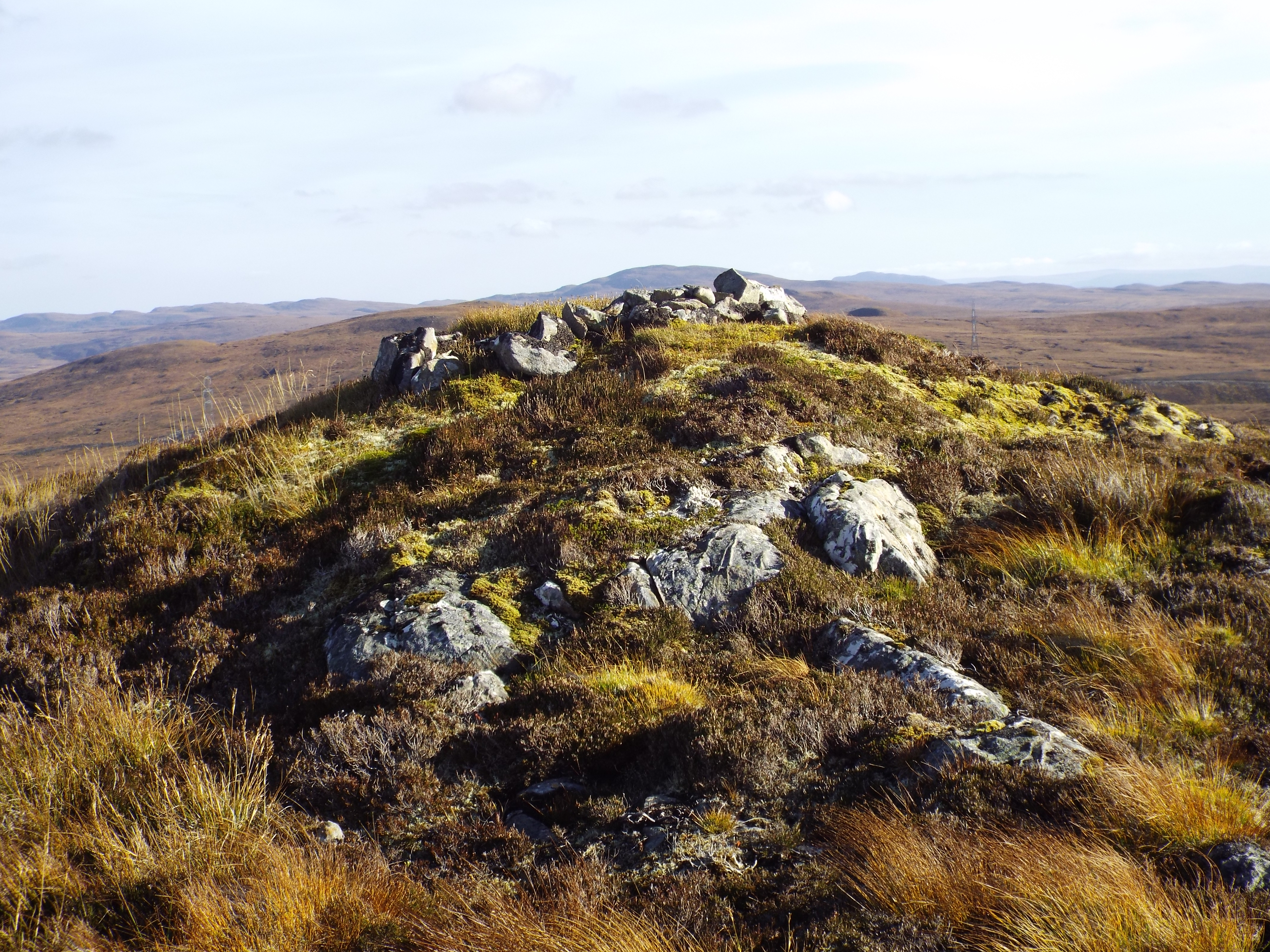

Clach-bheinn is a mountain in Highland, Scotland. It has an elevation of 576 m (1,890 ft) and a prominence of 49 m (161 ft) and is classed as a Dodd and a Highland Five. Its South Top is identified as a separate summit by the Database of British and Irish Hills, classed as a Subdodd, with an elevation of 548 m (1,798 ft) and a prominence of 20 m (66 ft).
