= Tom Molach =

Hill in Argyll and Bute, Scotland

Coordinates: 56°7′36″N 4°52′22″W

Tom Molach is a peak within the Ardgoil Peninsula and Arrochar Alps near Lochgoilhead in Argyll, Scotland. The peak reaches a height of 370 metres (1,210 ft).
