= Beinn Reithe =

Mountain in Argyll in the Scottish Highlands

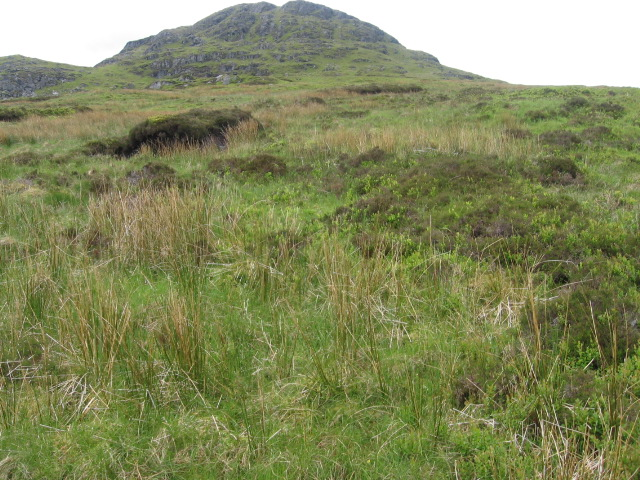
- Beinn Reithe.

Highest point
- Elevation: 656.2 m (2,153 ft)
- Listing: Mountains of the British Isles
- Coordinates: 56°08′N 4°51′W

Geography
- Location within Argyll and Bute
- Location: Argyll and Bute, Scotland
- Parent range: Arrochar Alps
- OS grid: NS228984

Beinn Reithe is a mountain in Argyll in the Scottish Highlands and forms part of the Ardgoil Peninsula and Arrochar Alps. Beinn Reithe is located between Loch Goil and Loch Long; it reaches a height just over 2,000 feet (600 metres). The mountain is most noticeable from the western shores of Loch Goil and it is also within Loch Lomond and the Trossachs National Park.
