= Torinturk =

Coordinates: 55°49′21.0″N 5°29′35.1″W

Torinturk: Scottish Gaelic: Tòrr an Tuirc
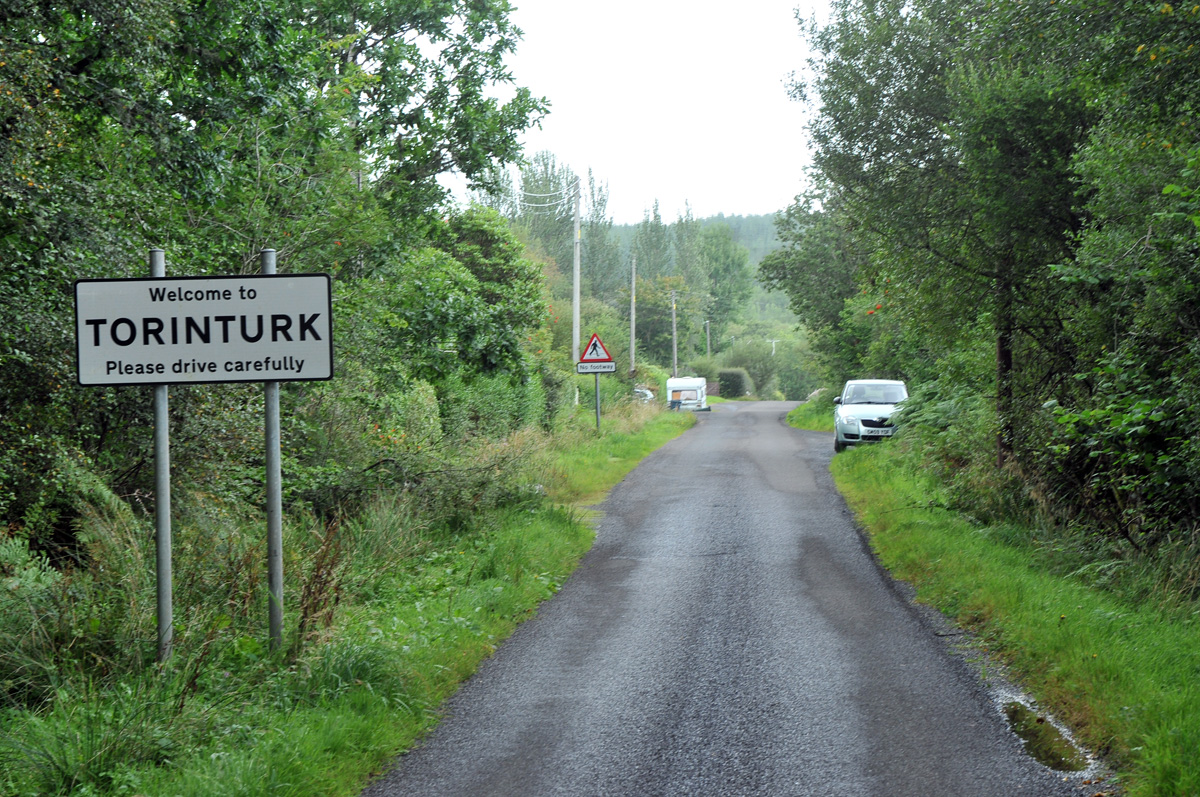
- The road into Torinturk

- Location within Argyll and Bute
- OS grid reference: NR812642
- Council area: Argyll and Bute
- Lieutenancy area: Argyll and Bute
- Country: Scotland
- Sovereign state: United Kingdom
- Post town: TARBERT
- Postcode district: PA29
- Police: Scotland
- Fire: Scottish
- Ambulance: Scottish
- UK Parliament: Argyll, Bute and South Lochaber
- Scottish Parliament: Argyll and Bute

Torinturk (Scottish Gaelic: Tòrr an Tuirc) is a village in Argyll and Bute, Scotland.

Torinturk is 5 miles (8 km) from Tarbert. Torinturk comes from the Gaelic for the hill of the boar. This is where the last wild boar in Scotland was killed.

== History ==
The present village was started in the 1930s with the building of 4 semi-detached bungalows now numbered 9, 10, 11 and 12. This was part of a nationwide scheme to help overcome high unemployment during the depression. Each house had land at the back to keep hens on and had land down near the sea pool for growing vegetables. The men who lived in the four houses planted the trees that are now part of Achnaglachgach Forest.

== Landmarks ==
- Dùn a' Choin Duibh, a hillfort located near Torinturk
