= Clach Bheinn (Loch Eck) =

Mountain on Cowal peninsula Scotland

Coordinates: 56.05376°N 5.01068°W

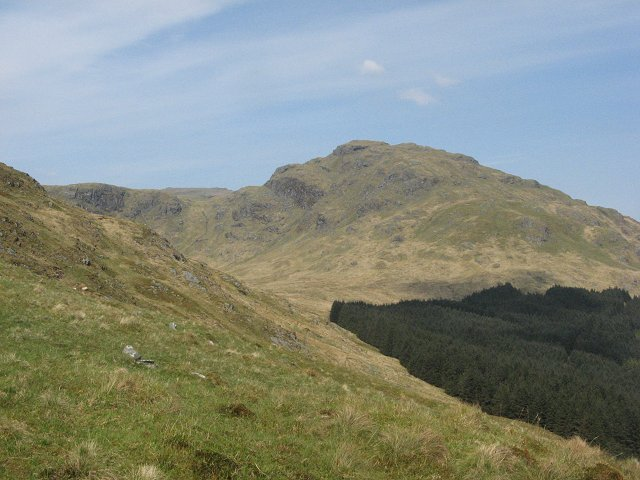
Clach Bheinn from the south east

Clach Bheinn is a mountain in Scotland, on the Cowal peninsula, west of Loch Eck. It has an elevation of 643 m (2,110 ft) and a prominence of 128 m (420 ft) and is classed as a Simm, a Yeaman (hill) and a Graham Top. Its parent peak is Beinn Mhòr (741.5 m (2,433 ft)), which lies 1.8 mi (2.9 km) to its north west.
