= Bennecarrigan Free Church =

Coordinates: 55.4493°N 5.2551°W

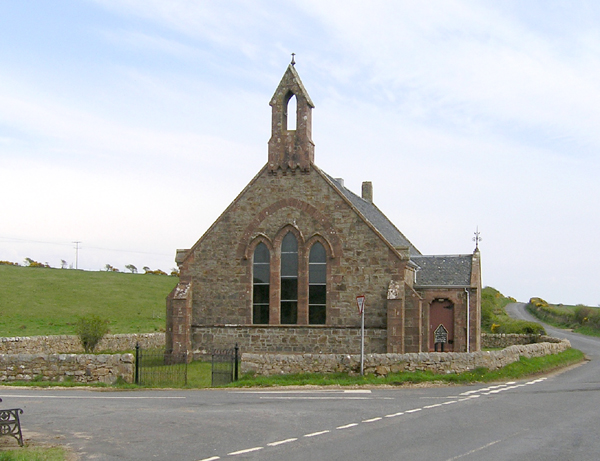
- Bennecarrigan Free Church of Scotland.
- Bennecarrigan Free Church
- Location: Kilmory
- Country: Scotland
- Denomination: Free Church of Scotland

History
- Founded: 1893

Architecture
- Functional status: church
- Heritage designation: Historic Scotland, ID 13633
- Style: Gothic
- Completed: 1893
- Closed: 2009

The Bennecarrigan Free Church is a place of worship of the Free Church of Scotland in Kilmory, on the island of Arran, Scotland. The church was built in 1893.
