= Clach Bheinn (Lochgoilhead) =

Hill near Lochgoilhead, Scotland

Coordinates: 56°6′56″N 4°52′28″W

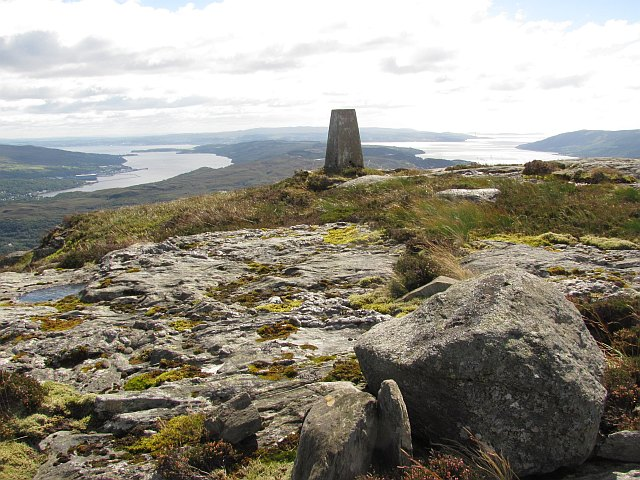
The summit

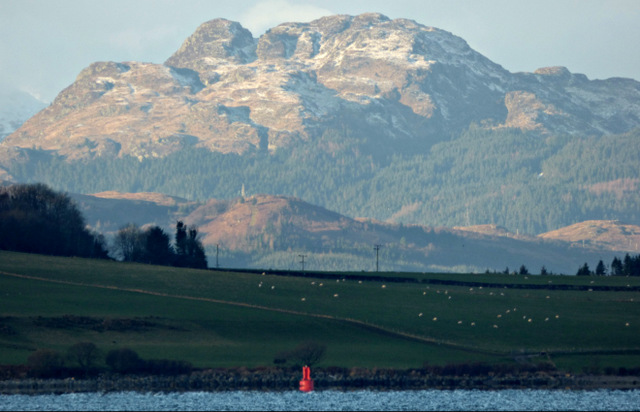
Clach Bheinn from Greenock, seen over Portkil bay

Clach Bheinn is a hill in Scotland near Lochgoilhead in the Ardgoil Peninsula and is within the Arrochar Alps. The hill reaches a height of 441 m (1,447 ft) and has a prominence of 134 m (440 ft).

It is in the area known as Argyll's Bowling Green.
