= Càrn Glas (Argyll and Bute) =

Mountain in Argyll and Bute, Scotland

Coordinates: 56°9′17″N 4°51′40″W

Càrn Glas is a mountain in the Ardgoil Peninsula and the Arrochar Alps near Lochgoilhead, Scotland. It reaches a height of 536.1 metres (1,759 ft), with a summit marked on Ordnance Survey mapping at 502 m (1,647 ft).
