= Cnoc Còinnich =

Corbett

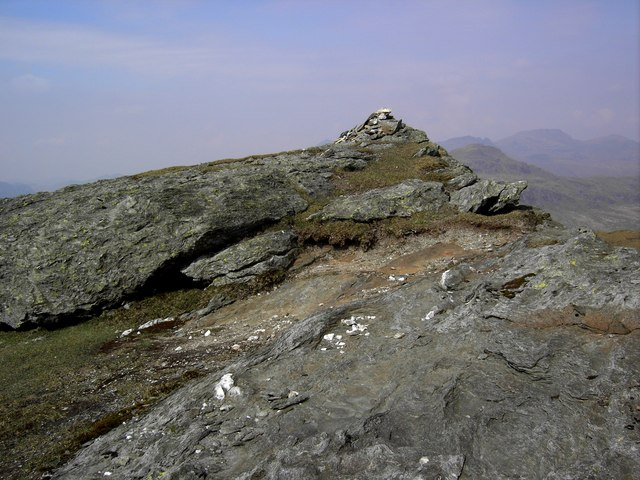
- Cnoc Còinnich summit

Highest point
- Elevation: 763.5 m (2,505 ft)
- Prominence: 273.6
- Listing: Corbett, Marilyn
- Coordinates: 56.1665°N 4.8463°W

Geography
- Location: Argyll and Bute, Scotland
- Parent range: Arrochar Alps

Cnoc Còinnich (Scottish Gaelic, "Mossy Hill") is a Corbett situated in Ardgoil in the Argyll & Bute council region and forms part of the Arrochar Alps.

Cnoc Còinnich missed out on Corbett status by one metre until July 2016 when it was resurveyed at the instigation of the Scottish Mountaineering Club (SMC). The new height is 763.5 m, changing its classification from one of the highest Grahams (second only to Beinn Talaidh) to one of the lowest Corbetts. The height was ratified by the Ordnance Survey and will be shown as 764 m on its maps.

The hill is easily ascended from either Lochgoilhead, or from Ardgartan on the A83 and is not far off the course of the Cowal Way long-distance footpath. It is often climbed together with The Brack, another Corbett which lies at the other side of the Coilessan bealach (col).

Cnoc Còinnich is topped by a small cairn at grid reference NN233007.
