= Achnagarron =

Coordinates: 57.70132°N 4.21024°W

Achnagarron: Scottish Gaelic: Achadh nan Gearran
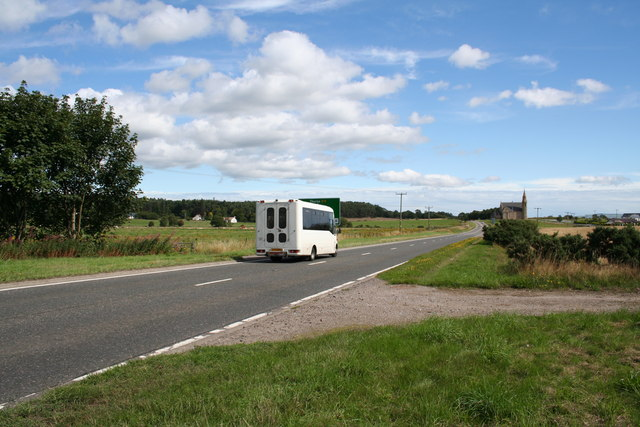
- Road approaching Achnagarron

- Location within the Highland council area
- OS grid reference: NH683700
- Council area: Highland
- Country: Scotland
- Sovereign state: United Kingdom
- Postcode district: IV18 0
- Police: Scotland
- Fire: Scottish
- Ambulance: Scottish
- UK Parliament: Caithness, Sutherland and Easter Ross
- Scottish Parliament: Caithness, Sutherland and Ross

Achnagarron (Scottish Gaelic: Achadh nan Gearran) is a small village in the Scottish council area of Highland. Achnagarron lies on the northern side of Cromarty Firth and is about 15 miles (24 km) north of Inverness.
