= William Stewart of Baldorran =

Scottish landowner (c.1440–c.1500)

- Arms of the Albany Stewarts
- Born: William Stewart c1440 Scotland
- Died: c1500 Scotland
- Occupation: Royal Bailie of the Crown Lands of Balquhidder
- Spouses: Janet Buchanan; Marion Helen Campbell
- Children: Janet Stewart (born c1475); Agnes Stewart (born c1477); Walter Stewart (born c1480); John Stewart (born c1485); Mariote Stewart, (born c1490)
- Parent(s): James "Beag" Stewart (c.1410–1470); Annabel Buchanan

Sir William Stewart (c.1440–c.1500), 2nd Laird of Baldorran, 1st Royal Bailie of the Crown lands of Balquhidder, was a fifteenth-century Scottish landowner, and founder of the Balquhidder Stewart clan. He was the grandson of James Mhor Stewart who launched a failed bid for the Crown of Scotland in 1429.

== Early life ==
William Stewart was born in around 1440, the son of James "Beag" Stewart (c.1410–1470) and Annabel Buchanan, daughter of Patrick, 14th Lord of Buchanan,

His grandfather was James Mhor Stewart, the only son of Murdoch Stewart, Duke of Albany, to survive the persecution of King James I of Scotland in 1425. Albany was executed by James for treason in 1425 along with his eldest sons, and his estates forfeited. James Mhor Stewart fled to Antrim, Ireland to escape the King's vengeance. His youngest son James "Beag" Stewart was able to secure a royal pardon and return to Scotland, where he married Annabel Buchanan, daughter of Patrick, 14th Lord of Buchanan, and was granted the estate of Baldorran. William Stewart was their second son.

== Bailie of the Crown Lands of Balquhidder ==
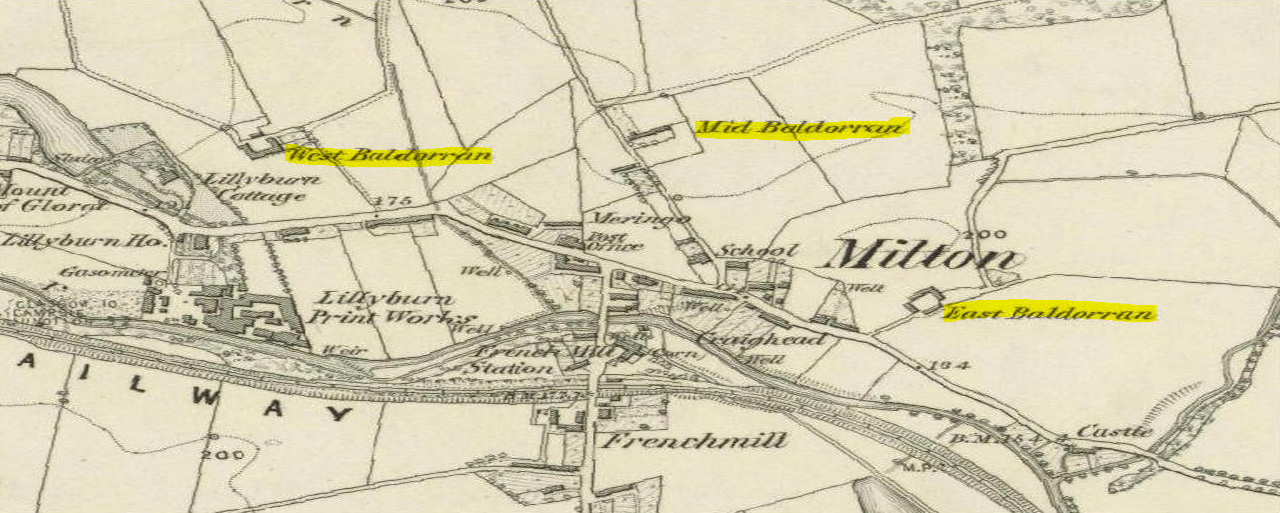
19th century map of Baldorran

In or around 1488 William Stewart of Baldorran was appointed Royal Bailie of the Crown Lands of Balquhidder. A baillie (alternative spelling bailie, from Old French) was a local civic officer in Scottish burghs, approximately equivalent to the post of alderman or magistrate (see bailiff) in other countries. They were responsible for a jurisdiction called a bailiary (alt. bailiery). Scottish barons often appointed a Baillie as their judicial officer.

William brought the Stewart name to Balquhidder and was the founder of the Balquhidder Stewart clan. The Stewarts of Ardvorlich, Glen Buckie, Gartnafuaran and Annat and their cadet families are all descended from him.

The name Baldorran is derived from the Gaelic, baille nan dobhran, meaning "town of the otter". It is sometimes spelled using the archaic form of "Balindoran". In any event Baldorran no longer exists. It was located in East Dunbartonshire, near Milton of Campsie, approximately 15 miles southwest of Stirling. The Stewarts of Baldorran sold Baldorran to the Glorat family, and today maps show the former residence of Baldorran as Glorat House.

William Stewart did much to restore prosperity to his family, ruined by the events of 1425 and the execution of his great-grandfather the Duke of Albany. He succeeded in expanding the family estates, adding parts of Upper Strathgartney and eventually most of Balquhidder.

== Family ==
Stewart married twice. His first wife was Janet Buchanan, daughter of Archibald Buchanan of Lettir (in Strathyre). They had two children:

- Janet Stewart (born c1475).
- Agnes Stewart (born c1477).

His second wife was Marion Helen Campbell, Of Glenorchy, daughter of Colin Campbell, 1st of Glenorchy, whom he married on 5 October 1498, and by whom he had three children:

- Walter Stewart, 3rd Laird of Baldorran, 2nd Bailie of Balquhidder, born c1480 in Baldorran, Campsie, Stirlingshire.
- John Stewart, 1st Laird of Glenbuckie, born c1485 in Baldorran, Campsie, Stirlingshire.
- Mariote Stewart, born c1490 in Baldorran, Campsie, Stirlingshire, Scotland.

In the portioning of Balquhidder which took place during the sixteenth century, the descendants of Sir William Stewart of Baldorran gained hereditary tacks of land.

== Ancestry ==
Ancestors of William Stewart of Baldorran

8. Murdoch Stewart, Duke of Albany
4. James the Fat
9. Isabella of Lennox
2. James "Beag" Stewart
10. unknown
5. Unknown McDonald clan member
11. unknown
1. William Stewart of Baldorran
12. Walter, 12th Lord of Buchanan
6. Patrick, 13th Lord of Buchanan
13. unknown
3. Annabel Buchanan
14. unknown
7. Jonet Cunningham of Galbraith
15. unknown

== See also ==
- Stewart of Balquhidder
