= James "Beag" Stewart =

- Arms of the Albany Stewarts
- Born: James Stewart c1424 Probably Scotland
- Died: c1470 Scotland
- Occupation: Farmer
- Spouse(s): Annabel Buchanan, daughter of Patrick, 14th Laird of Buchanan
- Children: John Stewart (born c 1450); Matilda Stewart (born c1452); William Stewart (born c 1455); Andrew Stewart (born c1458); Alexander Stewart (born c1460); Patrick Stewart (born c1462)
- Parent(s): James Mor Stewart; Mother unknown

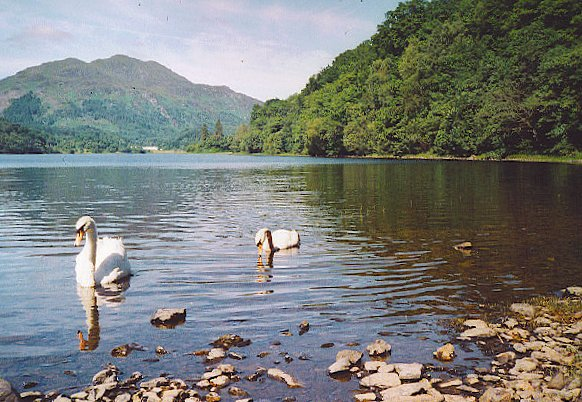
Loch Achray, where Stewart kept a hunting lodge.

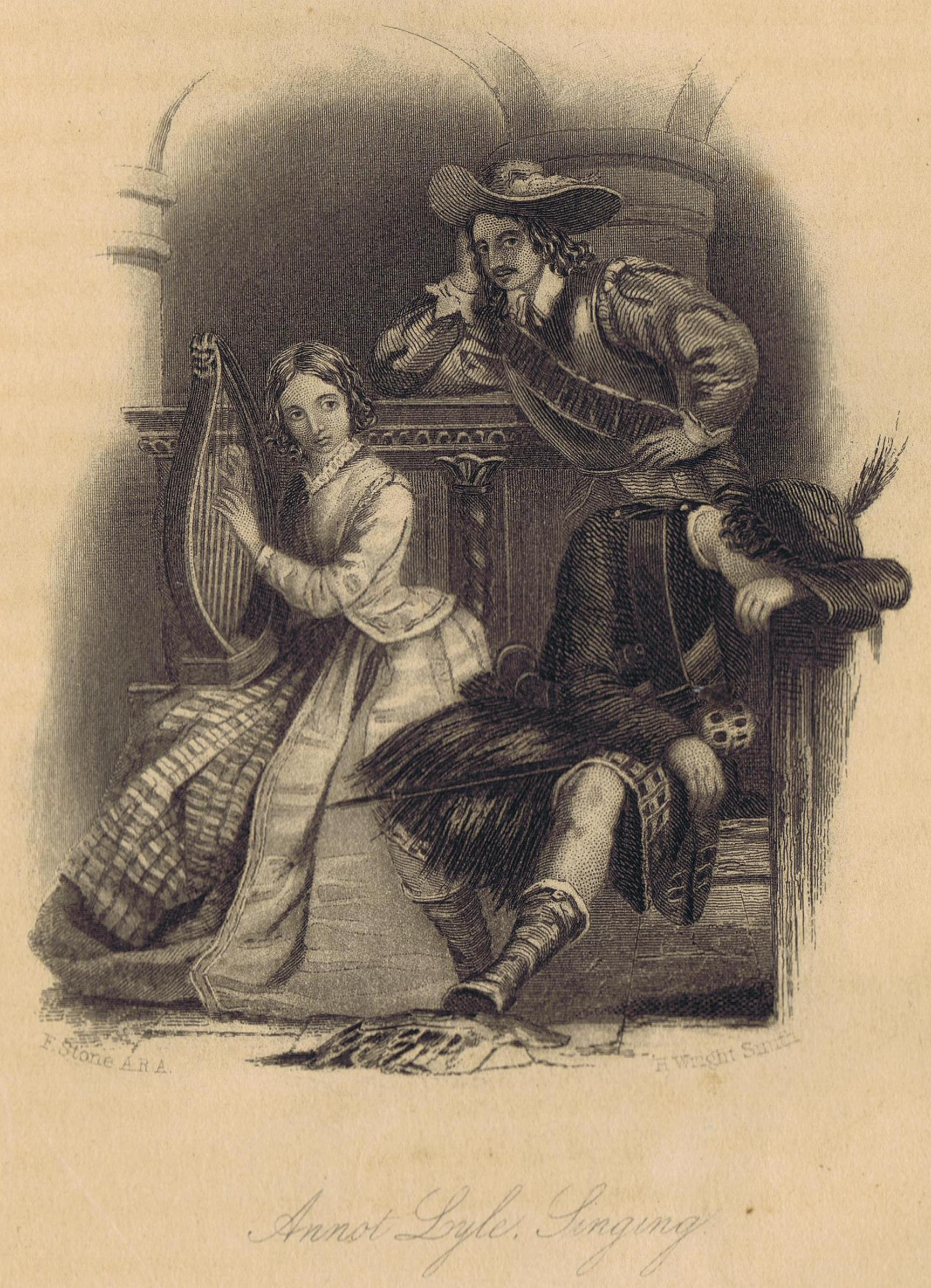
Cover illustration of Sir Walter Scott's A Legend of Montrose, which tells the story of Stewart's descendants, the Stewarts of Ardvorlich.

James "Beag" Stewart (c1424-1470) of Baldorran was the seventh illegitimate son of James Mor Stewart (known as "James the Fat"), who fled into exile in Ireland when his father Murdoch Stewart, Duke of Albany was executed for treason by James I of Scotland in 1425. James the Fat would never return to Scotland, and he was unable to inherit the Albany estates, but James "Beag" Stewart was able to secure a royal pardon and return to Scotland. He is the ancestor of the Stewarts of Ardvorlich on Lochearnside, whose family history is recounted by Sir Walter Scott in A Legend of Montrose.

== Early life ==
James "Beag" Stewart's exact birthdate is unknown. It seems likely he was born in Scotland some time before his father's exile to Ireland. "Beag" means small; literally "Little Stewart".

James was the eldest son of James Mor Stewart (known as "James the Fat"), who led an unsuccessful rebellion against King James I of Scotland and fled into exile in Ireland in 1425 when his father Murdoch Stewart, Duke of Albany and two of his brothers were executed for treason by King James in 1425. James the Fat would never return to Scotland, and he was unable to inherit the Albany estates, which were forfeited following his father's trial and execution. He died in Ireland in 1429.

James "Beag" Stewart was born into a large family with many siblings:

- Murdoch Stewart, born c.1427 in Antrim, Ireland.
- Arthur Stewart, born c.1429 in Antrim, Ireland.
- Robert Stewart, born c.1433 in Antrim, Ireland.
- Matilda Stewart, born c.1435 in Antrim, Ireland.
- Alexander Stewart, born c.1437 in Antrim, Ireland.

== Return to Scotland ==
Although James "Beag" Stewart was illegitimate, he nonetheless stood to inherit, in theory at least, his father's claim to the throne of Scotland. However, unlike his father, James "Beag" Stewart did not assert this claim and he was eventually able to secure a royal pardon and return to Scotland, becoming a loyal servant of the crown. He is the ancestor of the Stewarts of Ardvorlich on Lochearnside, whose family history is recounted by Sir Walter Scott in A Legend of Montrose.

Stewart had a small hunting lodge on the small island at the west end of Lochechray, "to which he resorted on any sudden emergency as a place of safety". Alexander Campbell, writing in 1812, tells the following story:

"It happened that a party of Argyleshire Campbells made an excursion to the King's forests of Glenartney and Glensinglais, whereof he [Stewart] was the keeper, and killed a great many of the deer and roebucks, without so much as asking the permission of Little James. The Argyleshire hunters, weary with the chase, and returning in quest of some habitation...met little James nearly opposite the small island on which his hut was situated, and inquiring of him what Magpie had built his nest on that island, he answered, 'One that hath scorned all manner of greedy hawks, from whatever quarter they might chance to come'. 'Tell the magpie from us (said the hunters) that we are no less disposed to hawk than to hunt around his nest; and tell him further, that we shall soon be on this way again, and mean to visit the nest of this vain chatterer: perhaps our hawks may not impress him with a mean opinion of their skill and dexterity in seizing their prey. Little James, somewhat nettled at the threatened visitation, peevishly replied; 'it may happen, likewise, that this chattering magpie, by the time your hawks have arrived within sight of his nest, by a singular power which he has over the hawks of these wooded mountains and glens, having called them in council, they may be prevailed on to suffer no strange hawks to infringe on their liberties, at least to within the range that they and their ancestors have for a length of time been accustomed.' So saying, they parted. In due time the Campbells kept their word; and Little James, having gathered his people from the various glens over which his influence extended, gave the meeting to the Argyleshire party in so warm a manner, that few returned to give an account of the hawking match for which they so merrily departed.

== Family ==
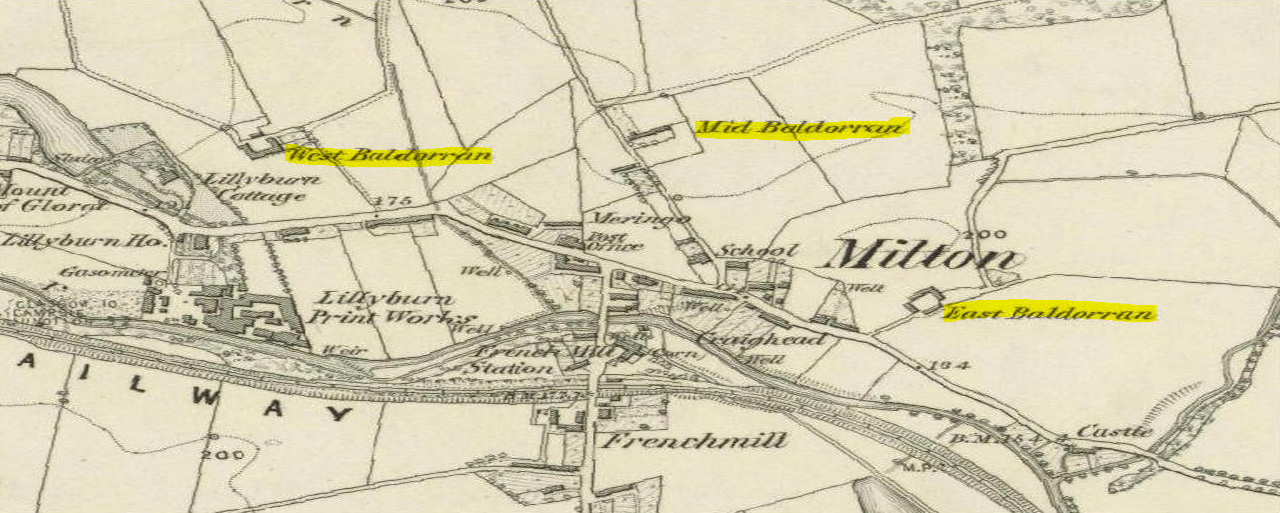
19th century map of Baldorran

James Stewart married Annabel Buchanan, daughter of Patrick, 14th Laird of Buchanan, and was granted the estate of Baldorran, (a.k.a. "Balindoran"), Stirlingshire, by his cousin John Stewart of Damby in 1457. They had six children:

- John Stewart, born c 1450. Died in childhood.
- Matilda Stewart, born c1452.
- William Stewart, born c 1455. Appointed Baillie of the Crown Lands of Balquhidder in around 1504. He married twice and had five children. The Stewarts of Ardvorlich, Glen Buckie, Gartnafuaran and Annat and their cadet families are all descended from him.
- Andrew Stewart, 1st Laird Of Gartnafuaran, born c1458
- Alexander Stewart, 1st Laird Of Garroquhill, born c1460
- Patrick Stewart of Ardkinknockane in Strathgartney, born c1462

== Ancestry ==
Ancestors of James "Beag" Stewart

8. Robert Stewart, Duke of Albany
4. Murdoch Stewart, Duke of Albany
9. Margaret, Countess of Menteith
2. James the Fat
10. Donnchadh, Earl of Lennox
5. Isabella of Lennox
11. Helena Campbell
1. James "Beg" Stewart
12. unknown
6. unknown
13. unknown
3. Unknown McDonald clan member
7. unknown

== See also ==
- Stewart of Balquhidder
