= Walter Stewart, 3rd Laird of Baldorran =

Walter Stewart of Baldorran
- Born: Walter Stewart c1480 Baldorran, Campsie, Stirlingshire
- Died: Scotland
- Occupation: Royal Bailie of the Crown Lands of Balquhidder
- Spouse: Euphemia Reideugh
- Children: 2
- Parent: William Stewart, 2nd Laird Of Baldorran

Walter Stewart (c. 1480-1575), 3rd Laird of Baldorran, 2nd Bailie of Balquhidder, was a sixteenth-century Scottish landowner, and the ancestor of the Ardvorlich, Annat, and Glenfinglas Stewarts.

== Early life ==
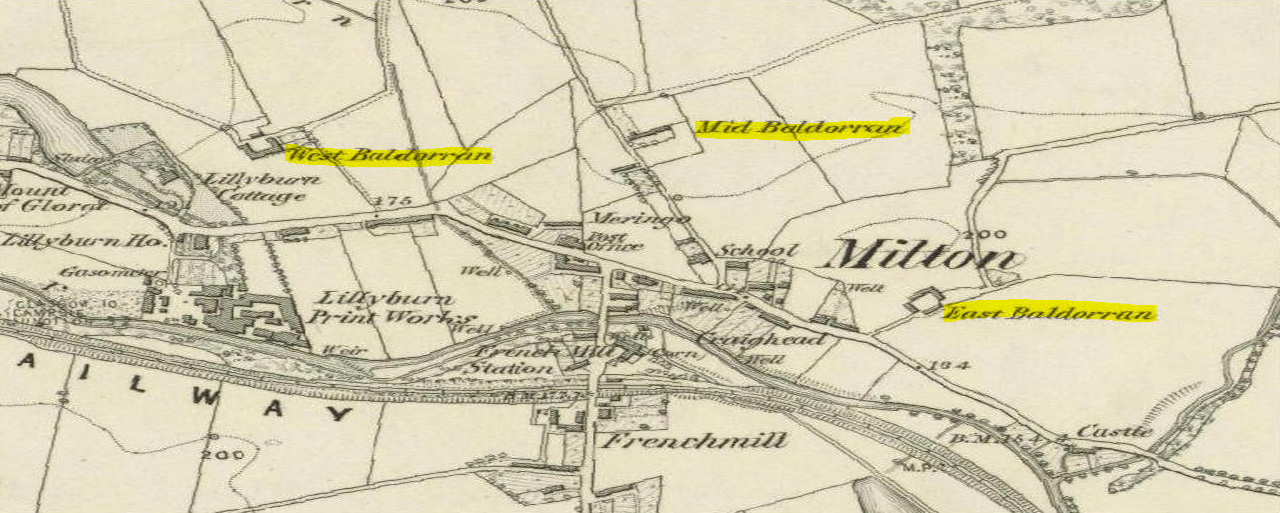
19th century map of Baldorran

Walter Stewart was born about 1480 in Baldorran, Campsie, Stirlingshire, the third son of William Stewart, 2nd Laird Of Baldorran. His mother was Marion Helen Campbell of Glenorchy.

Walter's father William Stewart of Baldorran was the founder of the Balquhidder Stewart clan.

== Bailie of the Crown Lands of Balquhidder ==
Walter succeeded his father as Royal Baillie of Balquhidder. He was confirmed in the ownership of his ancestral lands in September 1500 from his father Sir William Stewart.

== Family ==
Walter married Euphemia Reideugh (a.k.a. "Ruddock"), daughter of James Reideugh of Cultobraggan, comptroller of the household of King James IV. They had two children:

- James Stewart, born about 1510 in Campsie, married a daughter of Patrick Stewart of Glenbucky.
- Helen Stewart, born about 1515 in Perthshire, married John Dog.
