= Stewart of Balquhidder =

Scottish noble family

Arms of the Stewarts of Ardvorlich, one of the branches of the Balquhidder Stewarts

Stewart of Balquhidder is a Perthshire branch of the Stewart clan and scions of the royal House of Stewart from an illegitimate branch. They are descended from Sir William Stewart of Baldorran (c.1440 – c.1500), who was the great grandson of Murdoch Stewart, Duke of Albany, executed by King James I of Scotland for treason in 1425. Murdoch Stewart was himself the grandson of King Robert II of Scotland, who founded the Stewart dynasty.

The Stewarts of Balquhidder include the Stewarts of Ardvorlich, Glen Buckie, Gartnafuaran, and Annat. These families lived in the areas of Balquhidder, Callander, The Trossachs, Loch Earn and as far south as Stirling, from the 15th century to the present day. For the most part they were Tacksmen (Scottish Gaelic: Fear-Taic, meaning "supporting man"), land-holders of intermediate legal and social status in Scottish Highland society.

Although there is no formal clan association, the titular Clan Chief (were one to exist) would be Alexander Donald Stewart, 15th Laird of Ardvorlich, of Ardvorlich House, near Comrie, Perthshire. Stewart's family have lived at Ardvorlich House for over 400 years.

== Geography ==
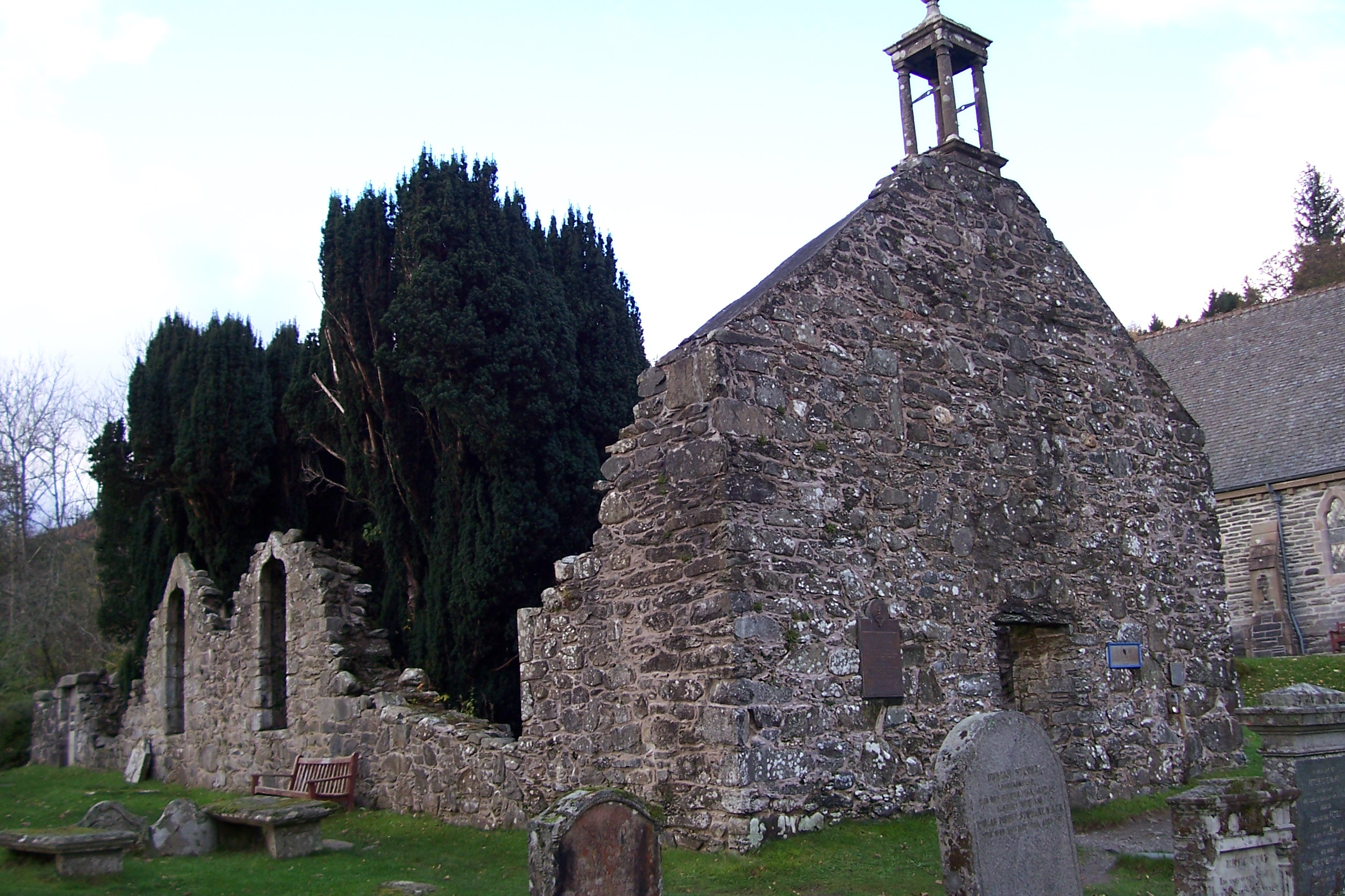
Ruins of Balquhidder church

Balquhidder is a parish in Perthshire, Scotland. The Stewart lands once included parts of neighbouring Comrie, Callander, Doune, Glen Ogle and Kilmadock. The families were associated together in a clan-like relationship in much the same way as the better known Clan Stewart of Appin.

== History ==
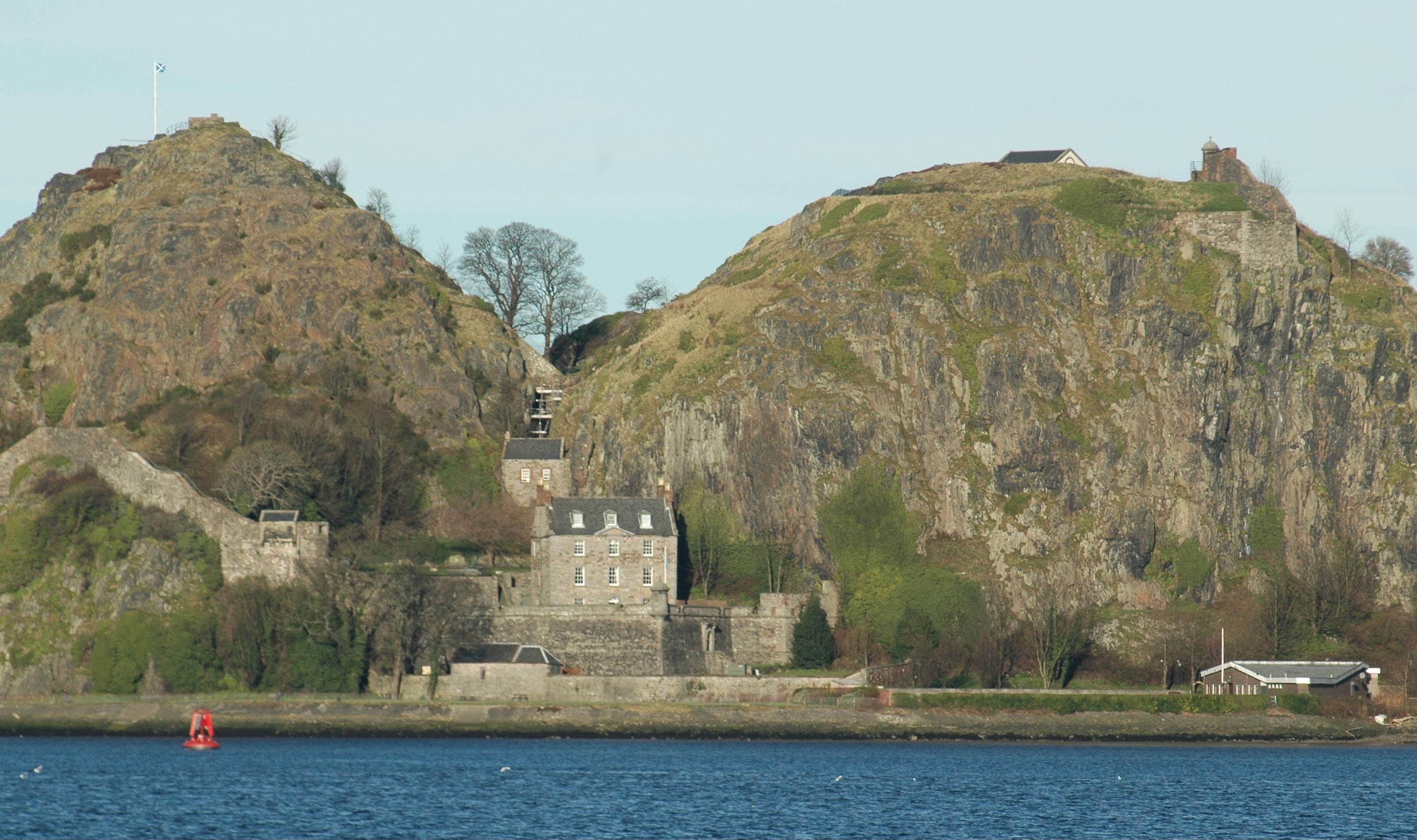
James the Fat seized Dumbarton Castle in 1425, killing its royal keeper.

After the execution of Murdoch Stewart Duke of Albany in 1425 and the forfeiture of the Albany Estates, Albany's youngest and only surviving son, James Mor Stewart, fled to Antrim, Ireland to escape the King's vengeance. Though James would never return to his native Scotland, his youngest son James "Beag" Stewart was eventually able to secure a royal pardon and return home. He married Annabel Buchanan, daughter of Patrick, 14th Laird of Buchanan, and was granted the estate of Baldorran (aka "Balindoran"), Stirlingshire. William Stewart was their second son.

In or around 1488 William Stewart of Baldorran was appointed Royal Bailie of the Crown Lands of Balquhidder, Perthshire. William brought the Stewart name to Balquhidder and founded the Balquhidder Stewart clan. The Stewarts of Ardvorlich, Glen Buckie, Gartnafuaran and Annat and their cadet families are all descended from him.

The Stewarts carved out a home for themselves in a relatively lawless part of Scotland, sharing the neighbourhood with the generally hostile Campbells of Edinample Castle, Aberuchill Castle, and Lawers House. More distant, but still close, were the Drummonds of Drummond Castle, the MacLarens of Strathyre, the Murrays of Ochtertyre, the Neishes of Neishes Isle, the MacNabs of Kinnoull in Glen Dochart, and the MacGregors of Balquhidder. Some were friends and others hostile.

=== Sir Walter Scott's A Legend of Montrose ===
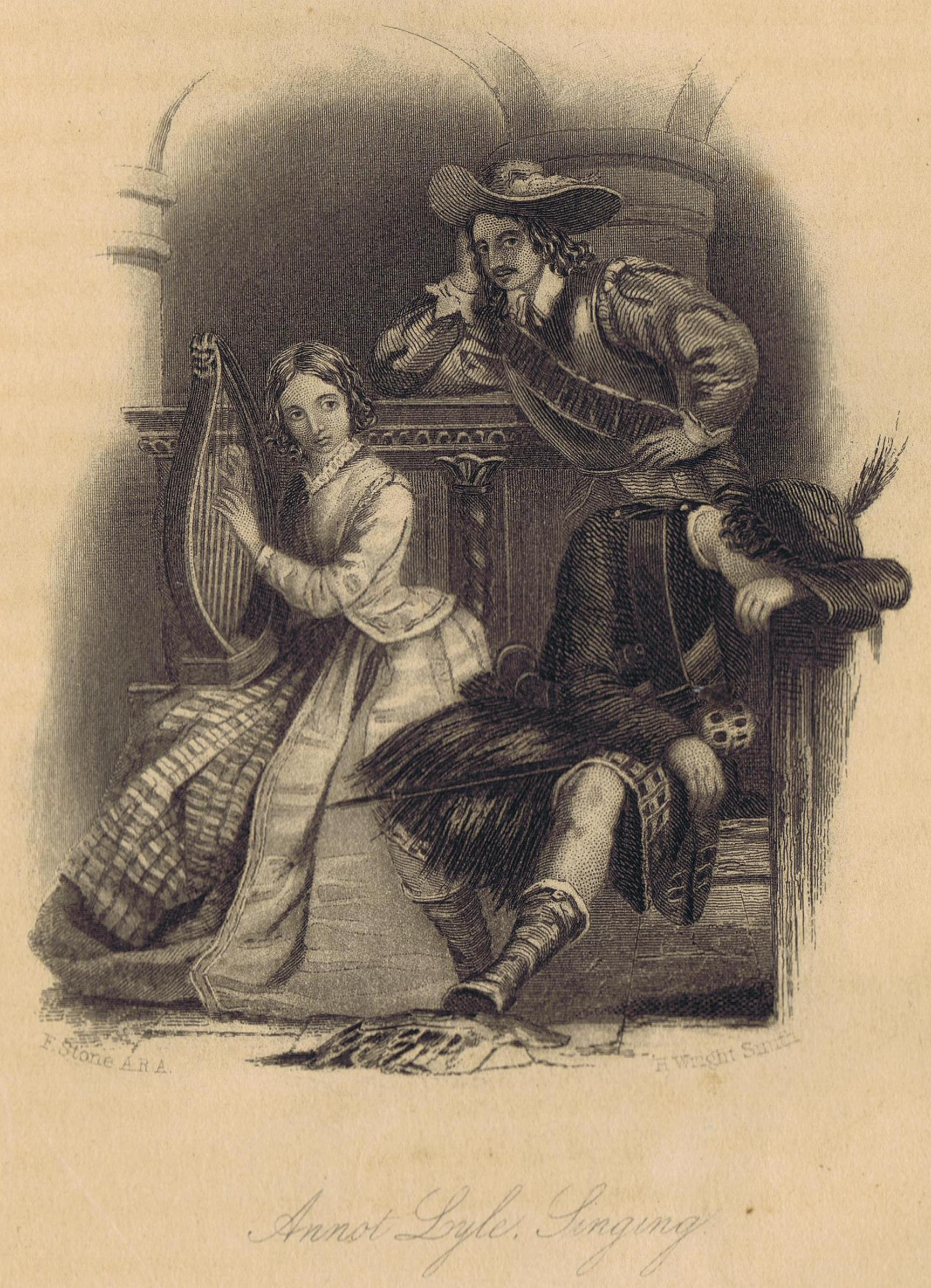
Sir Walter Scott's A Legend of Montrose. Scott's hero, Allan M'Aulay, is based on James Stewart of Ardvorlich, known as the "Mad Major".

The following story of murder provided the inspiration for Sir Walter Scott’s tale, A Legend of Montrose.

In the Seventeenth Century it was the custom to provide hospitality to anyone who asked for food and shelter. If the guest was not a friend, they were still put up, but instead of a cooked meal were given cold meat (this is where the phrase "given the cold shoulder" comes from). In accordance with this custom, Lady Margaret Stewart at Ardvorlich, pregnant at the time, gave hospitality to some travelling MacGregors. However, they had just come from murdering her brother, John Drummond of Drummonderinoch, and while she was out of the room placed his severed head on a silver platter, and placed in his mouth some of the cold victuals she had served them. She was so distraught that she ran out to the hills and gave birth to James Stewart, later known as the "Mad Major". The Loch she gave birth by is now known as Lochan na Mna, the Loch of the Woman, on the side of Beinn Domhnuill.

Major James Stewart is one of the great historical characters of the Covenanting Wars and is the hero of Sir Walter Scott's novel A Legend of Montrose, in which Scott changed James Stewart's name to Allan M'Aulay. This name is actually engraved on the foot of Major Stewart's gravestone in the Stewarts of Ardvorlich old kirk of Dundurn just outside the village of St Fillans on the shores of Loch Earn.

== Cadet Families ==
There are four principal branches of the Stewarts of Balquhidder: Ardvorlich, Glen Buckie, Gartnafuaran, and Annat. Each of these four principal families have several cadet branches and can also spell the name Steuart or Stuart. The Stewarts of Ardvorlich are the principal branch of the family.

== Ardvorlich House ==
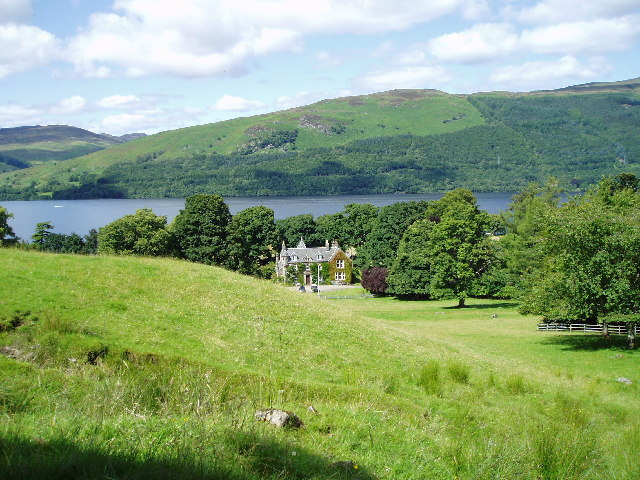
Ardvorlich House

Ardvorlich House, near Comrie, Perthshire, long the seat of the Stewarts of Ardvorlich, remains intact today. An account published in 1819 describes the house as: "The seat of William Stewart, Esq., surrounded by fine old timber, and very young plantations". The fictional castle of “Darnlinvarach”, described in Sir Walter Scott's 1819 novel A Legend of Montrose, was based on Ardvorlich House, which Scott had himself visited. The Stewarts of Ardvorlich have owned the estate for more than 400 years and continue to do so to the present day. The present 15th Laird of Ardvorlich is Alexander "Sandy" Stewart.

== Notable Clan Members ==
- John Stewart of Ardvorlich, author of The Stewarts (1963), and The Camerons, A History of Clan Cameron (1971)
- George H. "Maryland" Steuart, (1828–1903), one of the officers of the Army of Northern Virginia who surrendered in 1865 at Appomattox Court House to end the American Civil War.
- Robert Stuart, (1785–1848), partner in the North West Company and one of the explorers of the Oregon Trail.
- John Stuart, explorer, fur trader and Chief factor in the Hudson's Bay Company. Stuart Lake and Stuart River, both in British Columbia, are named after him.
- George Hume Steuart (1700–1784), physician, tobacco planter and Loyalist politician in colonial Maryland.
- James Baeg Stewart, 2nd Laird of Ardvorlich, "The Mad Major", an officer in the army of Sir David Leslie during the Scottish Civil Wars.
- Sir William Stewart of Baldorran (c.1440 – c.1500), 2nd Laird of Baldorran, 1st Royal Bailie of the Crown lands of Balquhidder, founder of the Balquhidder Stewart Clan.

== Ancestry of Stewarts of Balquhidder ==
Ancestors of Stewart of Balquhidder

8. Murdoch Stewart, Duke of Albany
4. James the Fat
9. Isabella of Lennox
2. James "Beag" Stewart
10. unknown
5. Unknown McDonald clan member
11. unknown
1. William Stewart of Baldorran
6. Patrick, 14th Laird of Buchanan
3. Annabel Buchanan

== See also ==
- Loch Earn
- Lochearnhead
