= Murdoch Stewart, Duke of Albany =

Scottish nobleman (1362–1425)

Murdoch Stewart
- Duke of Albany, Earl of Fife & Menteith
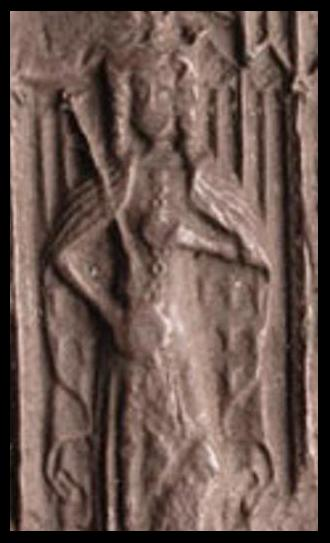
- Detail from the seal of Murdoch Stewart

Governor of Scotland
- Tenure: 1420–1424
- Predecessor: Robert Stewart
- Successor: James I (as king)
- Born: 1362
- Died: 25 May 1425
- Spouse: Isabella, Countess of Lennox
- Issue: Robert Stewart; Walter Stewart; Alexander Stewart; James the Fat; Isabel
- House: Stewart (Albany branch)
- Father: Robert Stewart, Duke of Albany
- Mother: Margaret, Countess of Menteith

Murdoch Stewart, Duke of Albany (Scottish Gaelic: Muireadhach Stiubhart) (1362 – 25 May 1425) was a leading Scottish nobleman, the son of Robert Stewart, Duke of Albany, and the grandson of King Robert II of Scotland, who founded the Stewart dynasty. In 1389, he became Justiciar North of the Forth. In 1402, he was captured at the Battle of Homildon Hill and subsequently spent 12 years in captivity in England.

After his father died in 1420, and while the uncrowned King James I of Scotland was himself held captive in England, Stewart served as Governor of Scotland until 1424, when James was finally ransomed and returned to Scotland. However, in 1425, soon after James's coronation, Stewart was arrested, found guilty of treason, and executed, along with two of his sons. His only surviving heir was James the Fat, who escaped to Antrim, Ireland, where he died in 1429. Stewart's wife Isabella of Lennox survived the destruction of her family. She lived to see the assassination of James I and the restoration of her title and estates.

== Early life ==
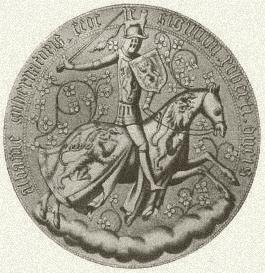
Seal of Murdoch's father, Robert Stewart, Duke of Albany

Stewart was born in 1362, the only son of Robert Stewart, Duke of Albany (1339–1420), and his wife Margaret Graham, Countess of Menteith. Duke Robert was a leading Scottish nobleman who was Regent of Scotland at various stages during the reigns of three kings, (Robert II, Robert III, and James I). In addition, Duke Robert held the titles of Earl of Menteith (28 February 1361), Earl of Fife (1361; resigned in 1372), Earl of Buchan (1394; resigned in 1406) and Earl of Atholl. In addition to exercising considerable power and wealth, the Albany Stewarts were potential heirs to the throne; Murdoch's grandfather was King Robert II of Scotland, who was the first member of the Stewart dynasty to rule Scotland.

Murdoch Stewart was raised in a large family, having eight sisters:

- Janet Stewart (married Sir David de Moubray);
- Mary Stewart (married Sir William Abernathy, 6th of Saltoun);
- Margaret Stewart (married to Sir John Swinton, 14th of that Ilk);
- Joan Stewart (married Sir Robert Stewart, Lord of Lorn);
- Beatrice Stewart (married Sir James Douglas, 7th Earl of Douglas);
- Isabella (Isobel) Stewart (married to Alexander Leslie, 7th Earl of Ross and later to Walter de Haliburton, 1st Lord Haliburton of Dirleton);
- Lady Marjorie Stewart (married to Sir Duncan Campbell, 1st Lord Campbell);
- Lady Elizabeth Stewart (married to Malcolm Fleming, ancestor of Malcolm Fleming, 3rd Lord Fleming).

His mother Margaret died in 1380. His father Duke Robert married a second time, to Muriella de Keith, with whom he had four children, the elder of whom was John Stewart, 2nd Earl of Buchan (1381–1424).

In 1389, at around age 27, Murdoch was appointed Justiciar North of the Forth. Father and son would now work together to expand their family interest, bringing them into violent confrontation with other members of the nobility, such as Donald McDonald, 2nd Lord of the Isles.

== War and capture ==
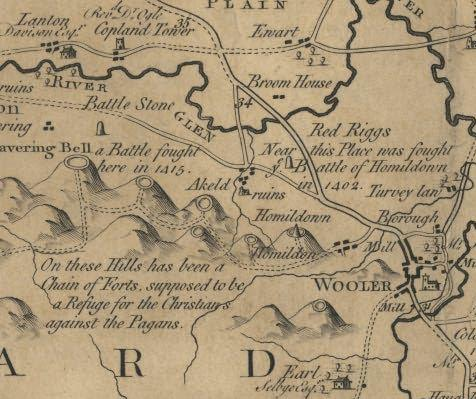
A detail from Armstrong's Map of Northumberland (1769) showing Humbleton (Homildon) Hill

Stewart served in Scottish military actions against the English in the early 15th century and was captured at the Battle of Homildon Hill, which took place on 14 September 1402 in Northumberland, England. Led by Archibald Douglas, 4th Earl of Douglas, the Scottish army had invaded England bent on plunder, in part to avenge the killing and capture of Scottish nobles in the Battle of Nesbit Moor on 22 June 1402. While returning to Scotland, they were intercepted by English forces led by Henry Percy, 1st Earl of Northumberland. The result was a decisive defeat of the Scottish army.

William Shakespeare later wrote, in his play Henry IV, Part 1:

Ten thousand bold Scots, two and twenty knights,
Balk'd in their own blood did Sir Walter see
On Holmedon's plains. Of prisoners, Hotspur took
Mordake the Earl of Fife, and eldest son
To beaten Douglas; and the Earl of Athol,
Of Murray, Angus, and Menteith:
And is not this an honourable spoil?
A gallant prize? ha, cousin, is it not?
--- William Shakespeare, Henry IV, Part 1, act 1, scene 1.

Murdoch Stewart (described above as "Mordake the Earl of Fife") was held as a prisoner in England for the next twelve years.

== Politics ==
Murdoch Stewart's captivity in England did not prevent his father from ruthlessly pursuing the family interest, often through violent means. On 26 March 1402 the Duke of Albany's nephew, David Stewart, Duke of Rothesay, had died in Falkland Palace while under his uncle's protection. King Robert III of Scotland, fearful that his younger son Prince James, the heir to the throne of Scotland, would suffer the same fate, sent him out of the kingdom to escape Albany's clutches. In 1406 James boarded the Maryenknyght, a ship from Danzig that was bound for France, but on 22 March 1406, the ship was taken by English pirates off Flamborough Head and James was delivered as a prisoner to King Henry IV of England. Soon afterwards, on 4 April 1406, King Robert III died, leaving Scotland without a King. Prince James, now the heir to the throne of Scotland and just 12 years old, would endure 18 years of detention in England. In his absence the Albany Stewarts took the reins of power, and Murdoch's father, Robert Stewart, Duke of Albany, became Governor of Scotland, king in all but name. The English price of returning James to Scotland was English overlordship of Scotland, something that few Scots were prepared to accept.

At this time Murdoch Stewart was still a prisoner in England, but in 1416 he was exchanged for Henry Percy, 2nd Earl of Northumberland, and he returned to Scotland. The Albany Stewarts took James's lands under their own control, depriving the king of income and any of the regalia of his position. James was referred to in the official records as merely "the son of the late king".

=== Governor of Scotland and Duke of Albany ===
In 1420, on his father's death, Murdoch, now aged 58, finally inherited the Dukedom of Albany. He also inherited the Earldom of Fife and the Earldom of Menteith, and at last became Governor of Scotland in his own right. He would hold this position from 1420 to 1424, while King James I was still held captive in England. Few serious attempts appear to have been made by Duke Albany to return James to Scotland, but eventually political pressure compelled Murdoch to agree to a general council.

=== Ransom and return of James I ===
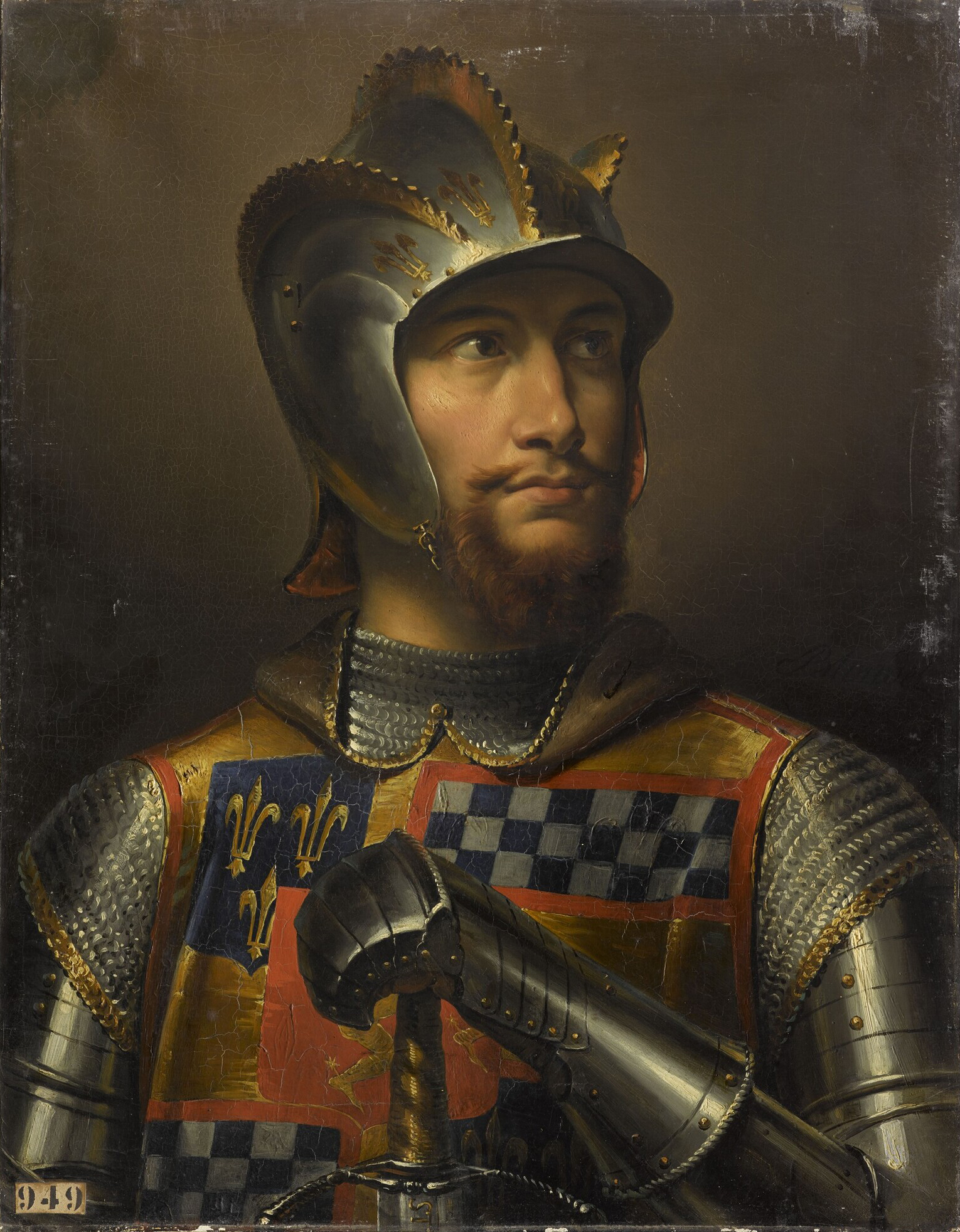
Murdoch's half-brother, John Stewart, Earl of Buchan, victor of the Battle of Bauge.

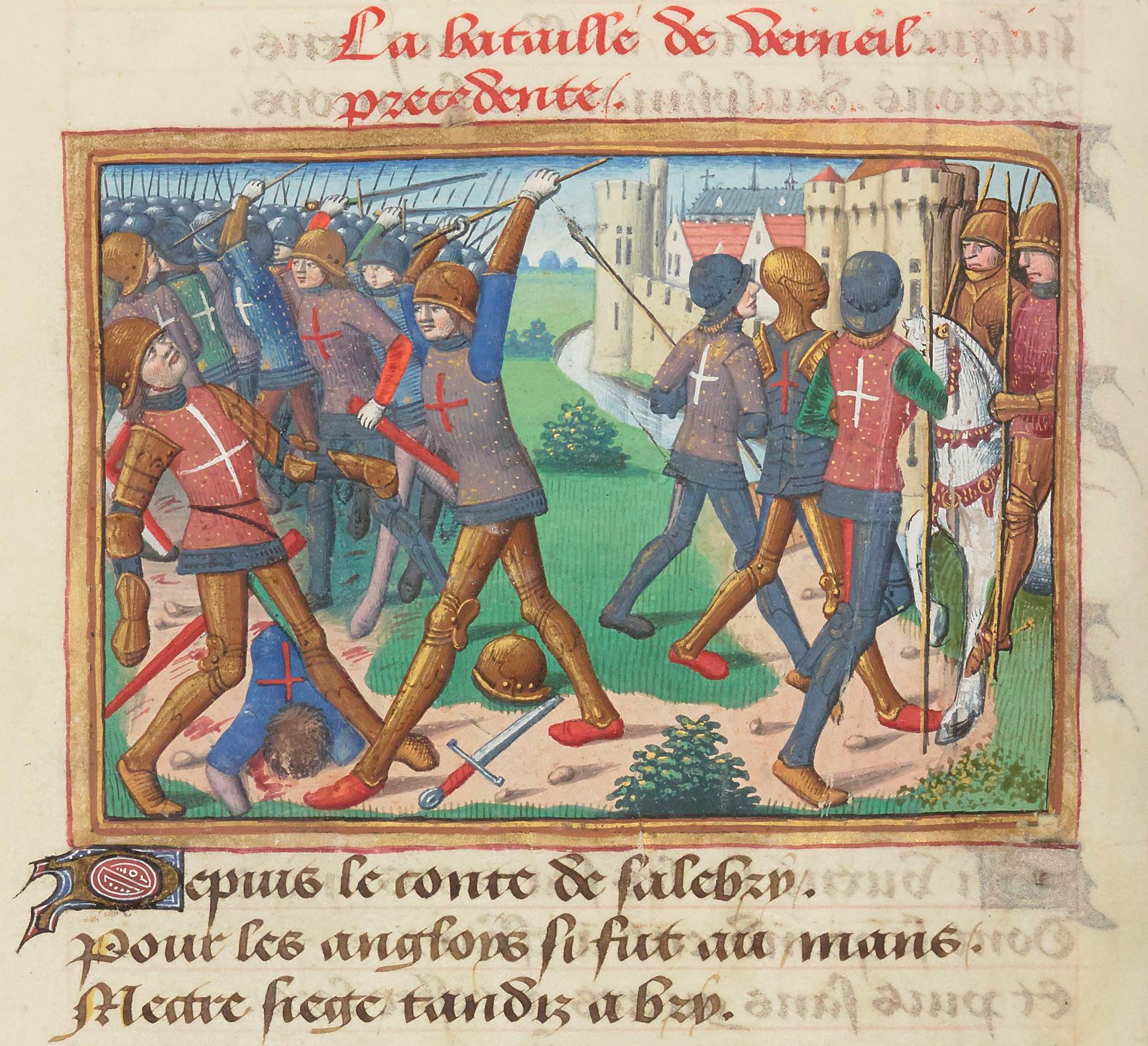
The Battle of Verneuil, where Albany's brother John Stewart, Earl of Buchan was killed and his army totally annihilated by the English.

In August 1423 it was agreed that an embassy should be sent to England to negotiate James's release. A ransom treaty of 60,000 marks (an enormous sum) was agreed at Durham on 28 March 1424, to which James attached his own seal – he and his queen, accompanied by an escort of English and Scottish nobles, proceeded to Melrose Abbey, arriving on 5 April where he met Albany to receive the governor's seal of office. Upon the return of James I to Scotland, Albany lost his position as Regent.

James began to consolidate his position. His coronation took place at Scone on 21 May 1424. At his coronation parliament the king – probably with the intent of securing a cohesive political community loyal to the crown – knighted 18 prominent nobles including Albany's son Alexander Stewart.

At this stage, it is probable that the king felt unable to take action against the Albany Stewarts while Murdoch's brother, John Stewart, Earl of Buchan and Archibald Douglas, 4th Earl of Douglas were fighting the English in France alongside their Dauphinist French allies. Buchan was a soldier with an international reputation and commanded the large Scottish army of around 6,000 men, a formidable force. In addition, he was Constable of France, making him the effective commander of the entire French army. However, both he and Douglas were killed at the Battle of Verneuil in August 1424 and the Scottish army was routed – the loss of these Albany allies with their fighting force left Murdoch politically exposed. James moved swiftly against his Albany Stewart relatives soon afterwards.

=== Arrest ===
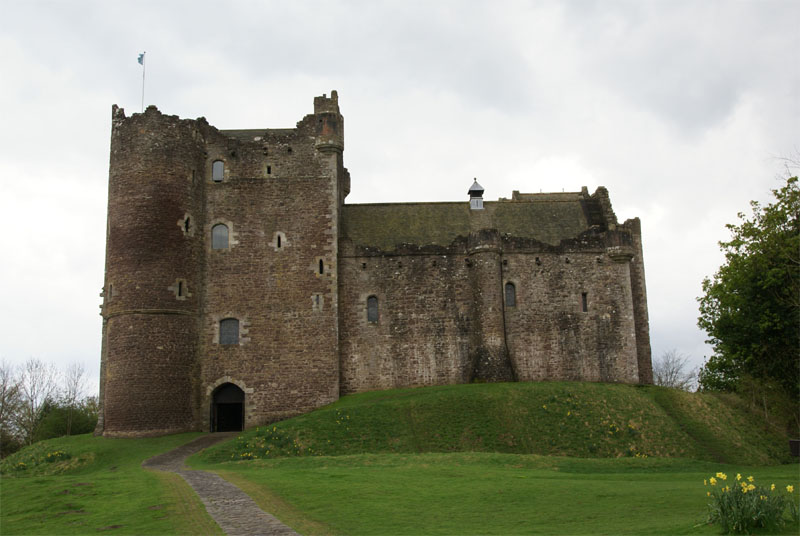
Doune Castle, where Albany's wife Isabella was arrested and captured.

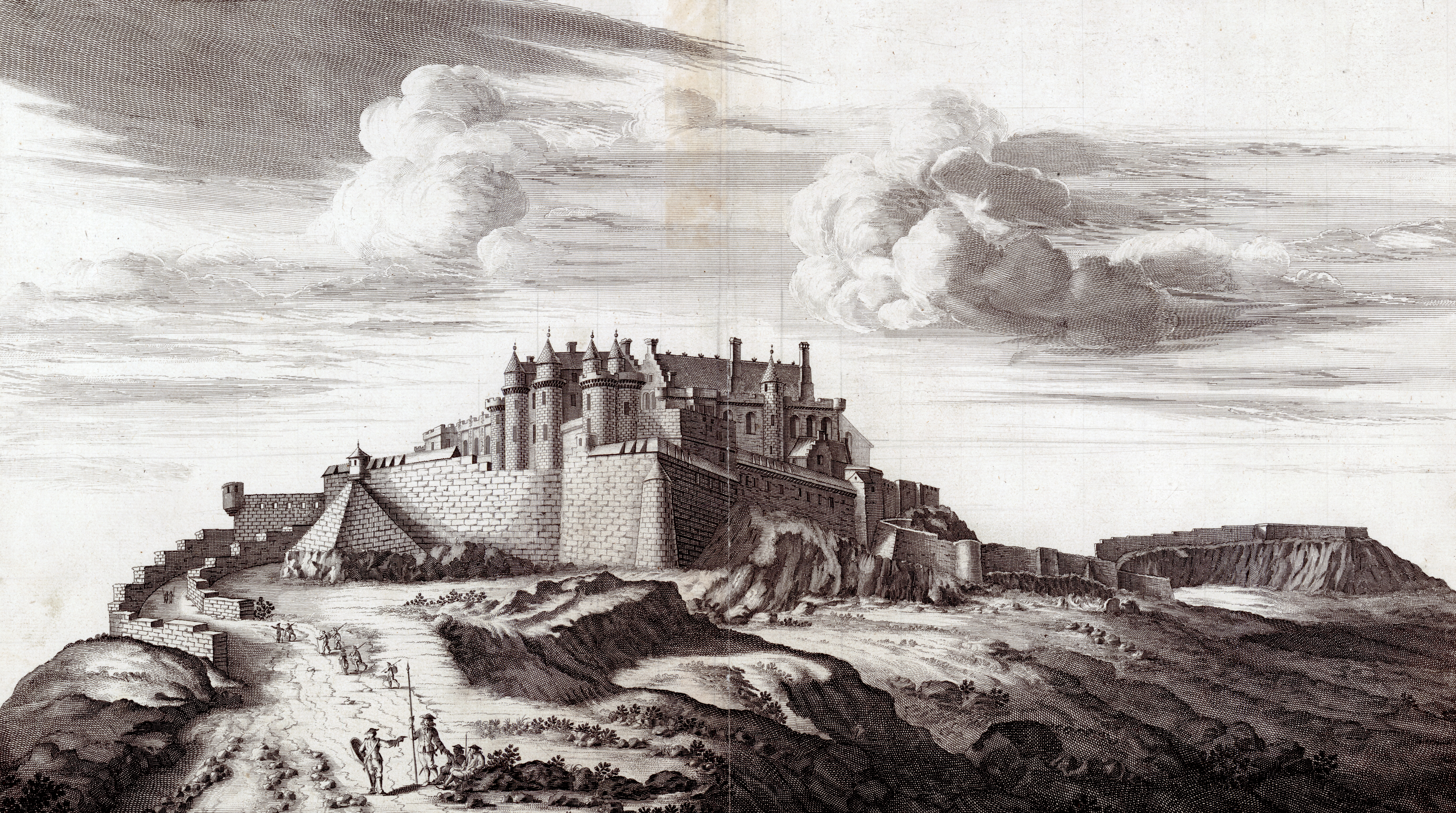
Stirling Castle, where the Albany Stewarts were executed

Murdoch was arrested, along with his younger son Lord Alexander Stewart. Albany was at first confined in the castle at St. Andrews and afterwards transferred to Caerlaverock Castle. His wife Isabella was captured in the family's fortified castle of Doune, their favourite residence, and committed to Tantallon Castle.

James's older brother David Stewart, Duke of Rothesay had died young, in Falkland Castle, while in the care of Murdoch's father, Robert Stewart, Duke of Albany. Though Albany had been exonerated by Parliament, the suspicion of foul play remained. Moreover, neither Duke Robert nor his son Murdoch had exerted themselves in negotiating James's release while in English captivity. This may well have left James with the suspicion that the Albany Stewarts had personal designs on the throne of Scotland.

At this time Albany's other son Walter was already in prison. James, Murdoch's youngest son (also known as James the Fat), escaped arrest. and fled into the Lennox, where he began to organise a revolt, leading men of Lennox and Argyll in open rebellion against the crown. He attacked and burned the burgh of Dumbarton with much loss of life. This resort to violence by Albany's youngest son may spurred the king into bringing a charge of treason against the Albany Stewarts, however, it is likely there was other evidence (no longer extant) for him to have gained the support of the leading magnates.

== Trial and execution ==
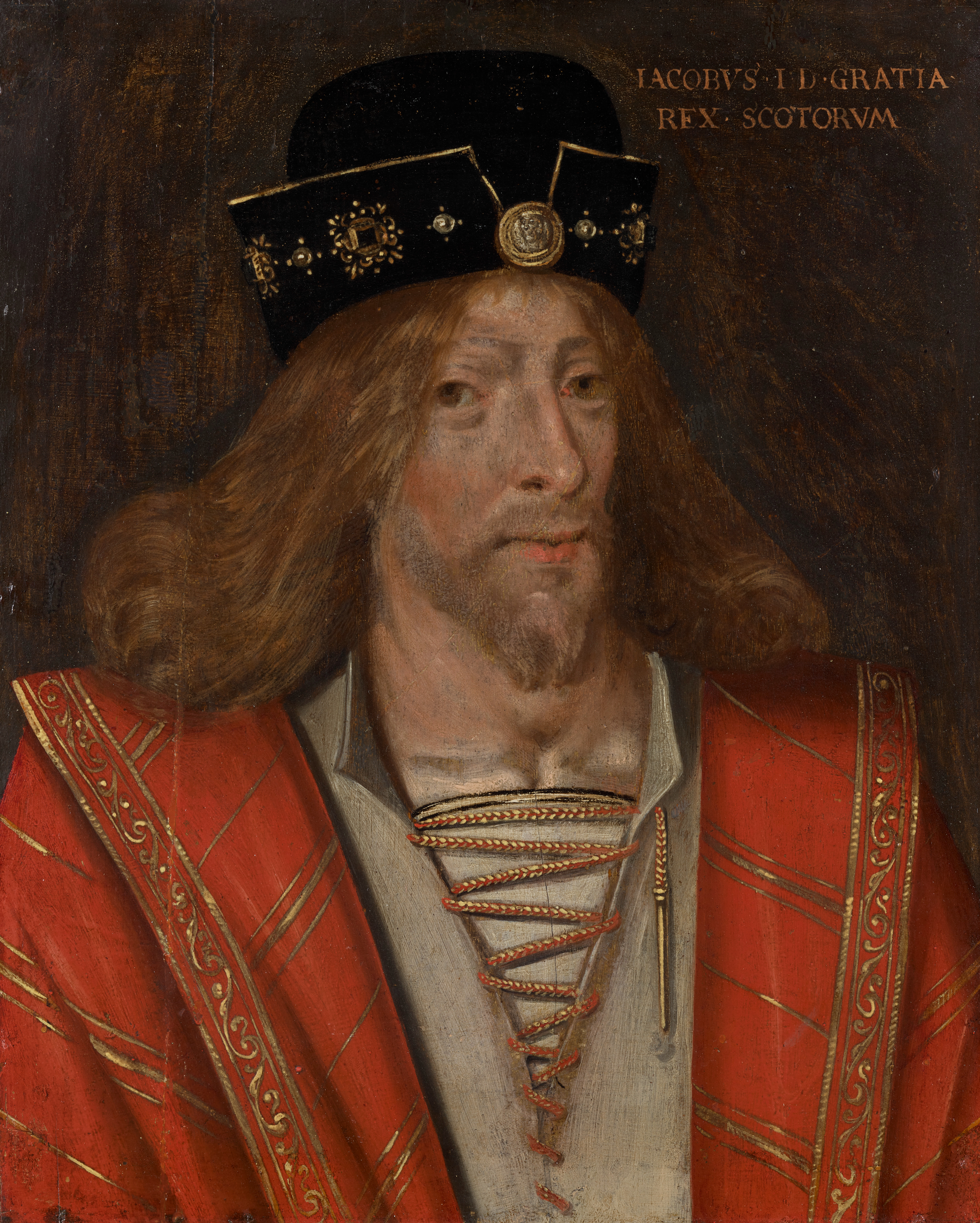
King James I, mortal enemy of the Albany Stewarts

Duke Murdoch, his sons Walter and Alexander, and Duncan, Earl of Lennox were in Stirling Castle for their trial on 18 May 1425, at a prorogued parliament in the presence of the King. An assize of seven earls and fourteen lesser nobles – including Albany's half uncle Walter Stewart, Earl of Atholl, first cousin Alexander Stewart, Earl of Mar, first cousins once removed Archibald Douglas, 5th Earl of Douglas, and Alexander, Earl of Ross and Lord of the Isles – heard the evidence that linked the prisoners to the rebellion in the Lennox – in a trial lasting just one day the four men were found guilty of treason.

Walter was condemned on 24 May 1425. Albany and his son Alexander were tried before the same jury the following day. All the prisoners were publicly beheaded on Heading Hill "in front of" Stirling Castle. Albany was attainted and all of his peerage titles were forfeited. He was buried at Blackfriars' Church, Stirling.

In the destruction of his close family, the Albany Stewarts, James I gained the substantial rents from the family's three forfeited earldoms of Fife, Menteith and Lennox, a blow from which the Albany Stewarts never recovered. More importantly, he secured his reign from the threat which had been constantly posed to him by the Albany Stewarts since his older brother's death, probably at their hands, decades before.

== Marriage and children ==
Murdoch was married to Isabella, daughter of Donnchadh, Earl of Lennox. They had four sons and a daughter:

- Robert Stewart (d. 1421);
- Walter Stewart, Master of Fife (executed 1425). Married to Janet Erskine; father of:
  - Andrew Stewart, 1st Lord Avondale who became Lord of Avondale in 1459, and Lord Chancellor of Scotland in the same year, becoming one of the leading servants of King James III of Scotland. He would hold the office of Chancellor for 25 years, dying in 1488;
  - Walter Stewart of Morphie;
    - Alexander Stewart (died 1489);
      - Andrew Stewart, 1st Lord Avondale;
        - Henry Stewart, 1st Lord Methven, married to Margaret Tudor as her 3rd husband; her 1st was King James IV.
- Alexander Stewart (executed 1425);
- James the Fat (Seamas Mòr) Stewart, fled to Ireland and died in 1429.
- Isabel, who married Sir Walter Buchanan, 12th Laird of Buchanan.

== Ancestry ==
Ancestors of Murdoch Stewart, Duke of Albany

8. Walter Stewart, 6th High Steward of Scotland
4. Robert II of Scotland
9. Marjorie Bruce
2. Robert Stewart, Duke of Albany
10. Adam Mure of Rowallan
5. Elizabeth Mure
1. Murdoch Stewart, Duke of Albany
6. John Graham, Earl of Menteith
3. Margaret Graham, Countess of Menteith
14. Alan II, Earl of Menteith
7. Mary II, Countess of Menteith

== Legacy ==
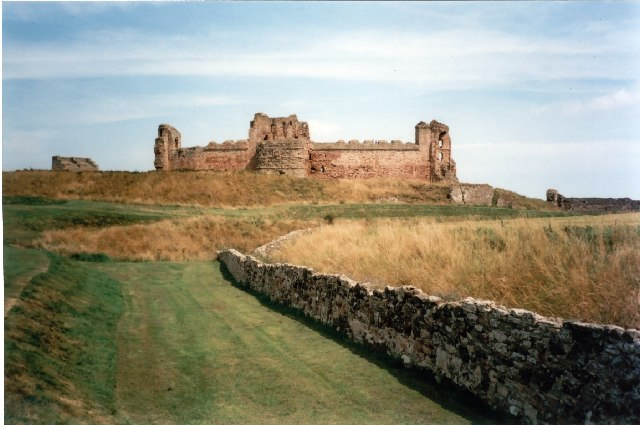
Tantallon Castle, where Albany's wife Isabella of Lennox was imprisoned for 8 years by King James I

Albany's sole surviving male heir was his youngest son, James the Fat who, after his failed rebellion, escaped to Ireland following the execution of his father and brothers. James remained in Ireland, unable to return, and died there in 1429. He was never able to inherit his father's titles, since they had been declared forfeit under the attainder. Albany's grandson, James "Beag" Stewart (c 1410—1470), would eventually secure a pardon from the King and return to Scotland, though the family would never recover their lost estates. James "Beag" Stewart is the ancestor of the Stewarts of Ardvorlich on Lochearnside, whose family history is recounted by Sir Walter Scott in A Legend of Montrose.

Albany's wife, Isabella of Lennox, survived the execution of her family, though she spent eight years as a royal prisoner at Tantallon Castle. In 1437, after the death of James I, she at last recovered her lands and title. In the next few years, although forced to govern her province from Loch Lomond, she issued a large number of charters and was tolerated by James's successor, King James II of Scotland, who allowed her to assume all her titles and honors as Duchess of Albany and Countess of Lennox.

== See also ==
- Alexander of Islay, Earl of Ross

== Sources ==
- Brown, M.H. (2004). "Stewart, Murdoch, second duke of Albany (c. 1362–1425)". Oxford Dictionary of National Biography (online) (online ed.). Oxford University Press. doi:10.1093/ref:odnb/26499. (Subscription, Wikipedia Library access or UK public library membership required.)
- Campbell, Alastair, A History of Clan Campbell, Volume 2
- Crawfurd, George, p.159, A General Description of the Shire of Renfrew (1818) Retrieved November 2010
- Mackie, J.D., A History of Scotland, Penguin Books, London (1964)
- Napier, Mark (1835). History of the Partition of the Lennox. W. Blackwood and sons. p. 13.
- Nelker, Gladys P., The Clan Steuart, Genealogical Publishing (1970)

Scottish royalty
Preceded by Robert Stewart	Duke of Albany; 1420–1425	Forfeit
Preceded by Margaret	Earl of Menteith; 1420–1425	Forfeit
