= James Mor Stewart =

15th-century Scottish rebel

James Mòr Stewart
- Coat of Arms of the Albany Stewarts
- Born: circa 1400; Scotland. Possibly Stirling, Stirlingshire.
- Died: 1429 (some sources say 1449); Antrim, Ireland
- Spouse: Unknown member of Clan MacDonald
- Issue: James "Beag" Stewart; Murdoch Stewart; Arthur Stewart; Robert Stewart; Matilda Stewart; Alexander Stewart
Names
- James Mòr Stewart (Scottish Gaelic: Seamas Mòr)
- House: House of Stuart
- Father: Murdoch Stewart, Duke of Albany
- Mother: Isabella of Lennox

James Mor Stewart, called James the Fat, (Note: The Gaelic appellation 'Mór' means big or large, not fat) (Scottish Gaelic: Seamas Mòr) (c. 1400–1429 or 1449) was the youngest son of Murdoch Stewart, Duke of Albany and Isabella of Lennox. When his father and brothers were executed by King James I for treason in 1425, James led a rebellion against the king, taking the town of Dumbarton and killing the keeper of Dumbarton Castle. His success was short lived and he soon fled to Ireland, where he would spend the remainder of his life in exile. A second attempt at rebellion in 1429 saw a fleet sail to Ireland to collect James "to convey him home that he might be king", but he died before the attempt could be made.

James's eldest son James "Beag" Stewart was able to secure a royal pardon and return to Scotland, and was the ancestor of the Stewarts of Ardvorlich on Lochearnside, whose family history is recounted by Sir Walter Scott in A Legend of Montrose. James Mor's brother Walter (executed 1425) left a son, Andrew Stewart, 1st Lord Avondale, who became Lord Chancellor of Scotland in 1459, and was one of the leading servants of King James III of Scotland.

== Biography ==
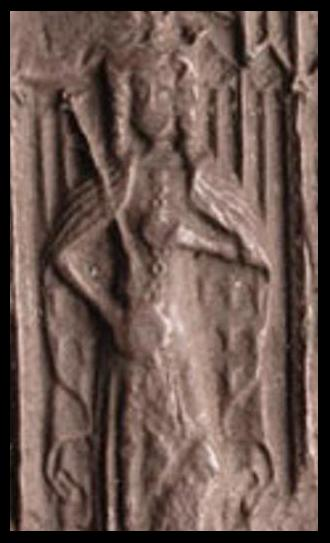
Seal of James's father, Murdoch Stewart, Duke of Albany

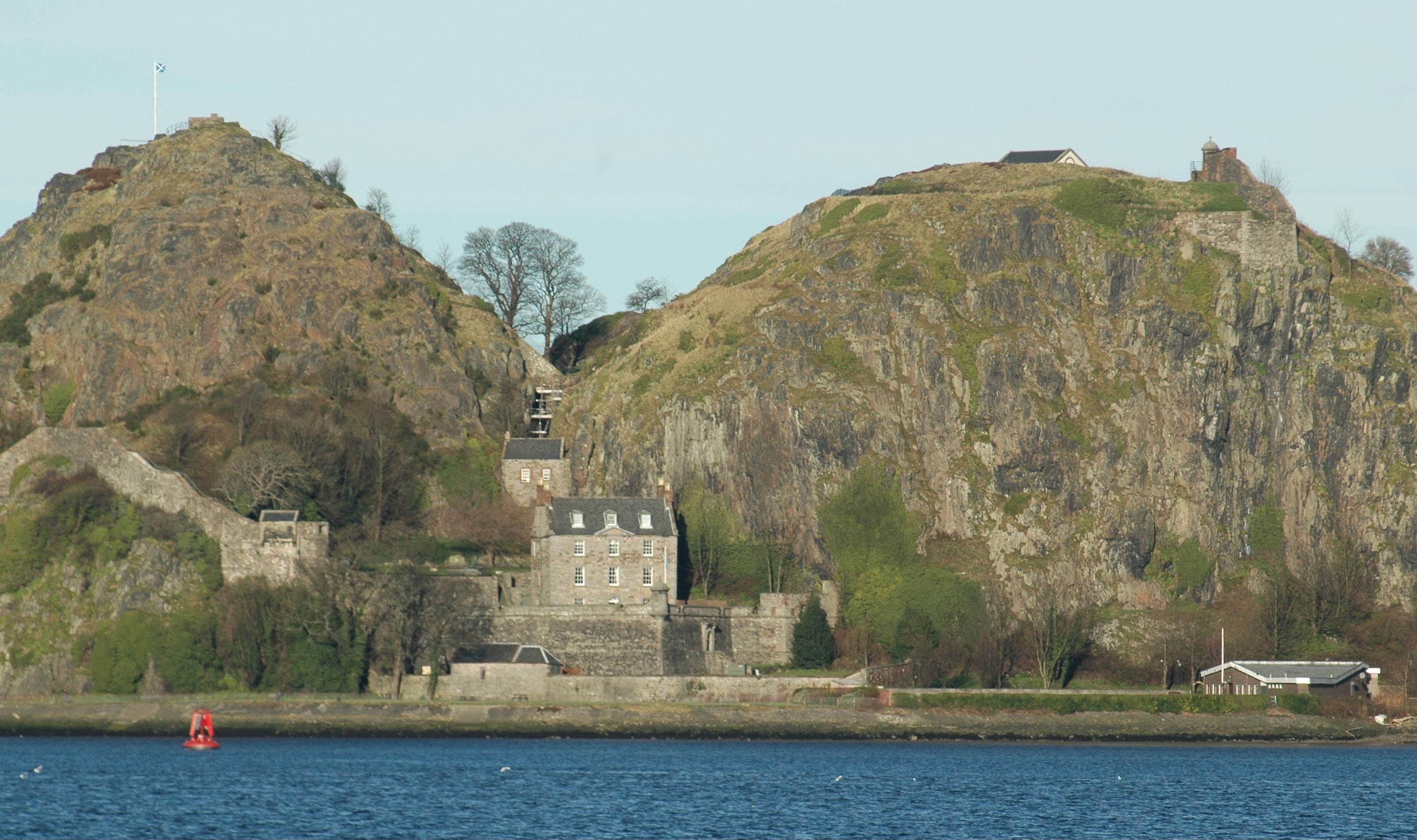
James burned the town of Dumbarton in 1425, but Dumbarton Castle held out against him.

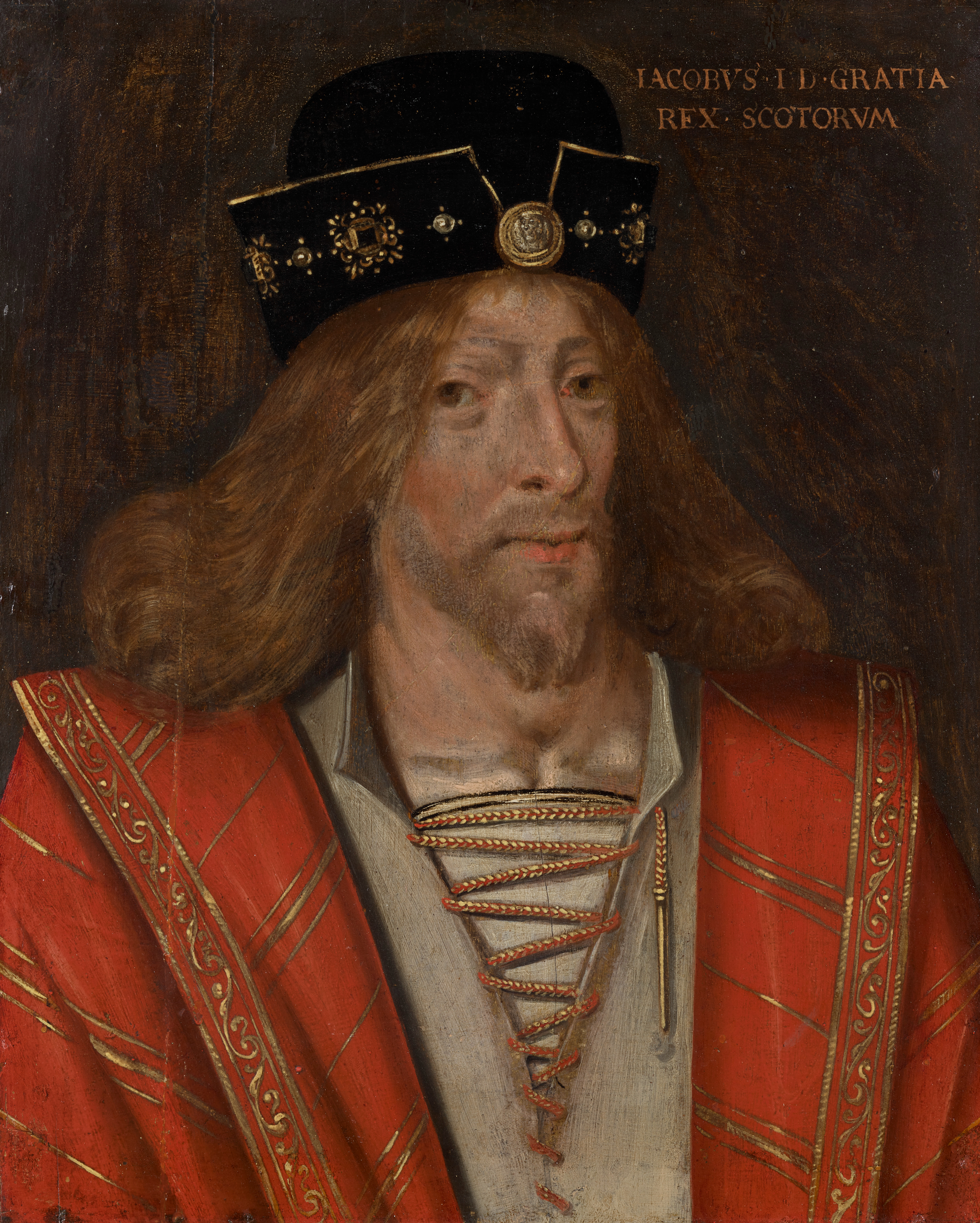
King James I of Scotland, mortal enemy of the Albany Stewarts.

Little is known of James's life before the arrest of his father, the Duke of Albany, and his eldest son Alexander, for treason by King James I of Scotland on 21 March 1425, on the 9th day of the March parliament. The family properties of Doune Castle and Falkland Palace were captured, and Duke Murdoch and two of his sons were imprisoned and held pending trial. James soon became a rallying point for enemies of the King, raising a large rebellion against the crown. Initially at least, events moved in his favour. He received the support of his mother's supporters in the Lennox, and also from Fionnlagh MacCailein, Bishop of Argyll, a long-standing supporter of the Albany Stewarts. James marched on the town of Dumbarton, burned it, and killed the keeper of the royal castle there, Sir John Stewart of Dundonald, who was the King's uncle. However, the castle itself, commanded by John Colquhoun, successfully held out against James's men.

Among other supporters were the Clan Galbraith, in particular the ninth chief James Galbraith of Culcreuch who joined Stewart's rebellion. As many as 600 members of the clan were forced to flee after the failure of the revolt, exiled to Kintyre and the Isle of Gigha, where they adopted the new name of MacBhreatneaich of M'Vretny ("son of the Briton") .

=== Escape to Ireland ===
James Mor's rebellion was quickly defeated. His father and brothers were found guilty of treason by a jury of knights and peers, and executed after a trial. At a stroke, almost all of James' family was wiped out. Only his mother, Isabella of Lennox survived the insurrection. Later in 1425, pursued by a royal expedition, James fled to Antrim, Ireland, accompanied by the sons of his dead brother Walter, to escape the King's justice. Few details of his escape survive but it seems likely that he sought assistance from the Campbells of Lochawe, to whom he was closely linked by blood and marriage.

James Mor would never return to his native Scotland. He remained an exile in Ireland until his death. His widowed mother and sister remained in Scotland.

=== Claim to the throne ===
James Stewart was in line to claim the throne as sole surviving grandson of the Duke of Albany, brother to the late King Robert III.

== Family and legacy ==
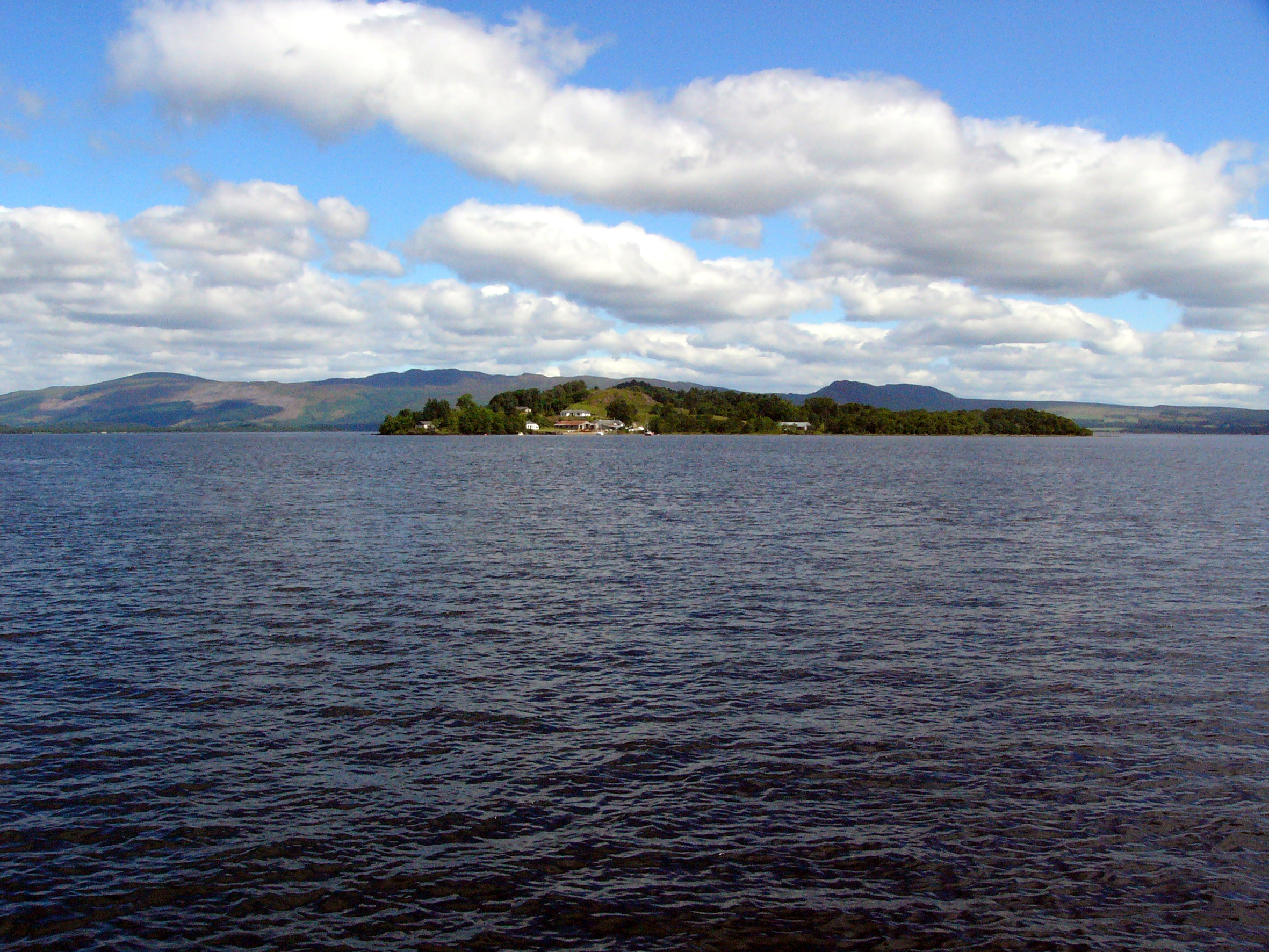
Inchmurrin, Loch Lomond, where James' mother Isabella of Lennox raised her grandchildren after her eventual release from Tantallon Castle.

In Ireland, James became involved with an unknown woman with the surname MacDonald. Some sources suggest she was one of the daughters of Iain Mòr Tànaiste MacDhòmhnaill, 1st Earl of Antrim, the son of John of Islay, Lord of the Isles and Earl of Ross. James did not marry, but he had seven illegitimate children:

- James "Beag" Stewart (born c.1424–1470) was able to secure a royal pardon and return to Scotland. He married Annabel Buchanan, daughter of Patrick, 14th Lord of Buchanan, and was granted the estate "Baldorran" from his cousin John Stewart Damby in 1457. He is the ancestor of the Stewarts of Ardvorlich on Lochearnside, whose family history is recounted by Sir Walter Scott in A Legend of Montrose.
- Murdoch Stewart, born c.1427 in Antrim, Ireland.
- Arthur Stewart, born c.1429 in Antrim, Ireland.
- Robert Stewart, born c.1433 in Antrim, Ireland.
- Matilda Stewart, born c.1435
- Alexander Stewart, born c.1437 in Antrim, Ireland.

James' mother Isabella of Lennox was imprisoned by King James in Tantallon Castle after the execution of her husband and children. However, in 1437 the King was himself assassinated, and soon afterwards Isabella was released from captivity, eventually recovering her lands and title. In the next few years, although forced to govern her province from her castle at Inchmurrin, Loch Lomond, she issued a large numbers of charters, was popular in the province, and was tolerated by King James II. At some point after she regained her liberty, Isabella brought her young grandchildren, the children of James the Fat, to be raised at her castle at Inchmurrin.

== Ancestry ==
Ancestors of James Mor Stewart

8. Robert II of Scotland
4. Robert Stewart, Duke of Albany
9. Elizabeth Mure
2. Murdoch Stewart, Duke of Albany
10. Sir John Graham
5. Margaret, Countess of Menteith
11. Mary Menteith, Countess of Menteith
1. James the Fat
12. Baltar mac Amlaimh
6. Donnchadh, Earl of Lennox
13. Margaret of Lennox
3. Isabella of Lennox
7. Helena Campbell

== See also ==
- Clan Stewart
- Stewart of Balquhidder
- List of heirs of Scotland
