= Mote Hill =

Hill in Stirling, Scotland

Coordinates: 56.1277°N 3.9428°W

- Heiding Hill, Murdoch's Knowe, Hurlie Haw, Hurly-Haaky
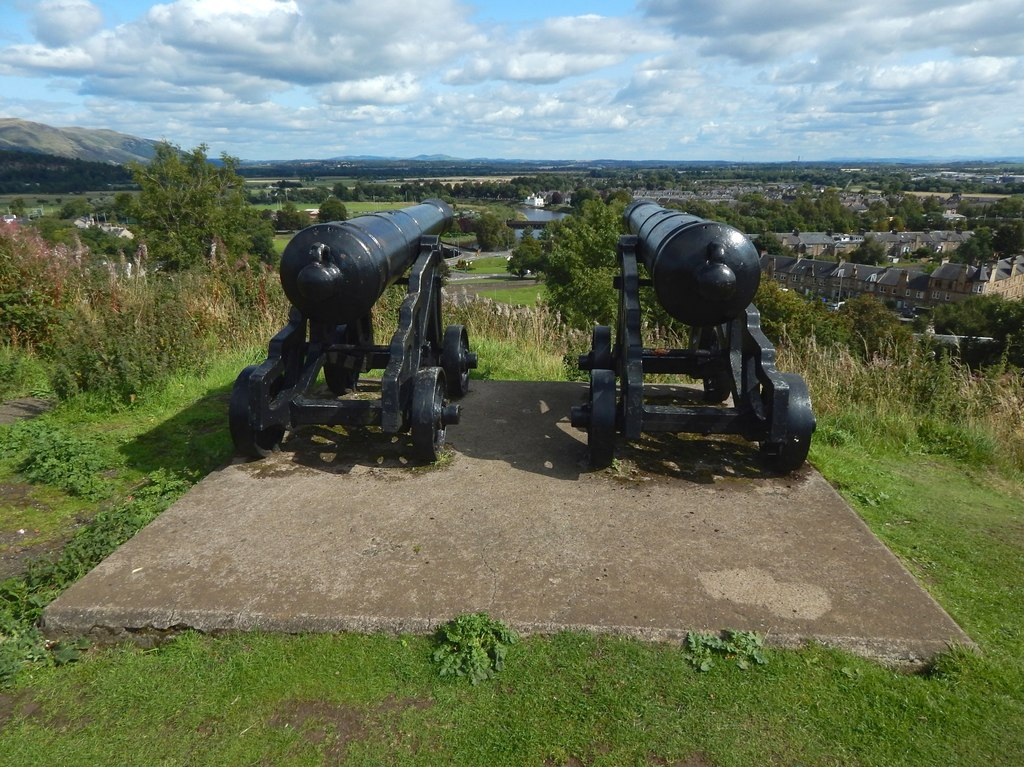
- A view of from Mote Hill towards the Firth of Forth

Geography

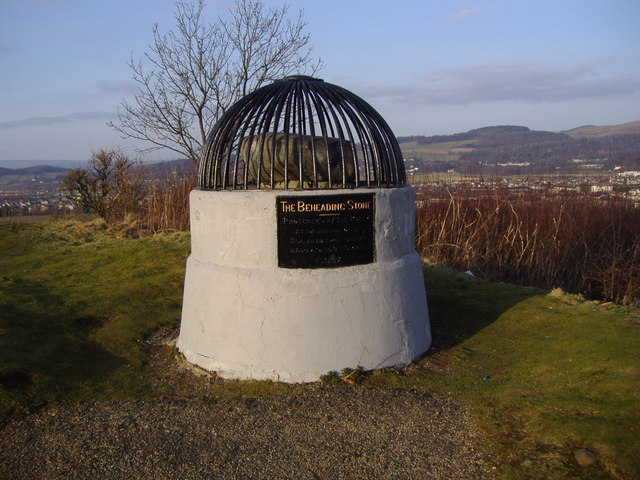
The Beheading Stone

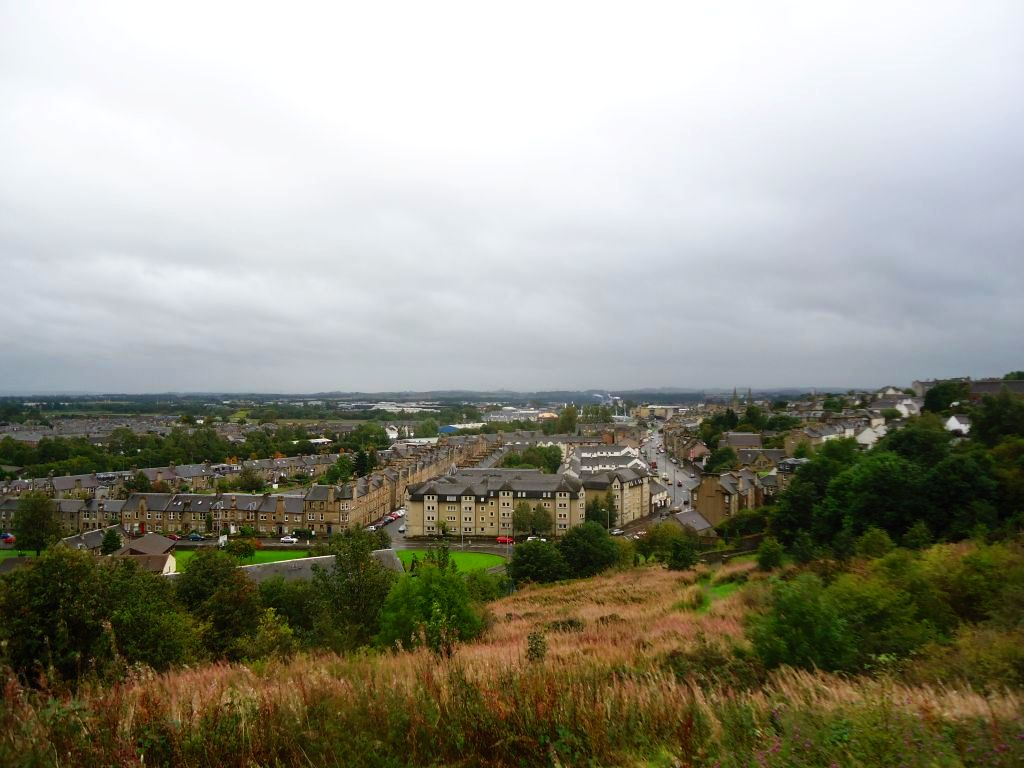
view towards Cowane Street from Mote Hill

Mote Hill is the northern tip of the Gowanhills, Stirling, the northern half of the Royal Park that extends around Stirling Castle. The wider park includes the King's Knott and sections of a 2-metre-high deer wall, first established in the 12th century, though Gowan Hill only became part of the Royal Park around 1500.

Ten thousand years ago, Mote Hill was a promontory projecting into a lost prehistoric sea. On the opposite bank of the River Forth lies Abbey Craig, upon which sits the National Wallace Monument. These two rocky outcrops were, for thousands of years, the lowest crossing point of the Forth.

Mote Hill is also known as Heiding Hill or Murdoch's Knowe or Hurlie Haw and is the location of the Beheading Stone, the traditional execution block of medieval Stirling. The stone itself is now on a concrete mount and under an iron cage, but you can still see the axe marks from the executions.

Mote Hill is also the site of a vitrified fort, destroyed by fire in the first half of the first millennium AD. This date was confirmed by excavation by Dr Murray Cook, Stirling Council's archaeologist.

== Hill fort ==
As noted above there was a fort on Mote Hill overlooking the crossing of the River Forth. While this has been referred to as a Celtic hillfort, modern academics prefer not to use this loaded term, its likely the fort was either constructed by the Damononian (as mapped by the Ptolomaic map) or Maeatae peoples. It was destroyed in a blaze which produced volcanic temperatures which melted the stone leaving only a vitrified fort.

== Account from Groome's Gazetteer ==
Along the northeastern side of the Castle Rock of Stirling is the deep hollow known as Ballengeich, and beyond this is the undulating height known as Gowling or Gowan Hill. This was the site of one of the Jacobite batteries during the siege of the Castle in 1746. Near the northern corner is the rounded grassy summit called the Mote Hill or Heading Hill, the

"sad and fatal mound!
That oft hast heard the death-axe sound,
As on the noblest of the land
Fell the stern headsman's bloody hand."

It was the scene of the execution of the Duke of Albany, his two sons, and his father-in-law, the Earl of Lennox, in 1425; and as the Castle and Braes of Doune are visible from it, Albany's last glance must have been over his own wide domain. It seems to have been here also that in 1437 Sir Robert Graham and those of his associates in the murder of James I who were executed at Stirling had an end put to their torments. The Mote Hill is known locally as Hurly-Haaky, a name said to be derived from an amusement indulged in here by James V when he was young, and alluded to by Sir David Lindsay, who says

"Some harlit hym to the Hurlie-Hackit."

It seems to have consisted in sliding down a steep bank in some sort of sleigh. Sir Walter Scott says the Edinburgh boys in the beginning of the 19th century indulged in such a game on the Calton Hill, 'using for their seat a horse's skull;' and as hawky or haaky is a Scottish word meaning a cow, it is possible that a cow's skull may have been used formerly for the same purpose. All this tract of ground is now open to the public, and walks beginning here extend round the base of the Castle Rock and along the wooded slopes to the southwest of the old town, the principal path in this latter portion being the Back Walk with its fine trees. It was laid out in 1724 at the instigation of William Edmonstone of Cambuswallace.

== Executions ==
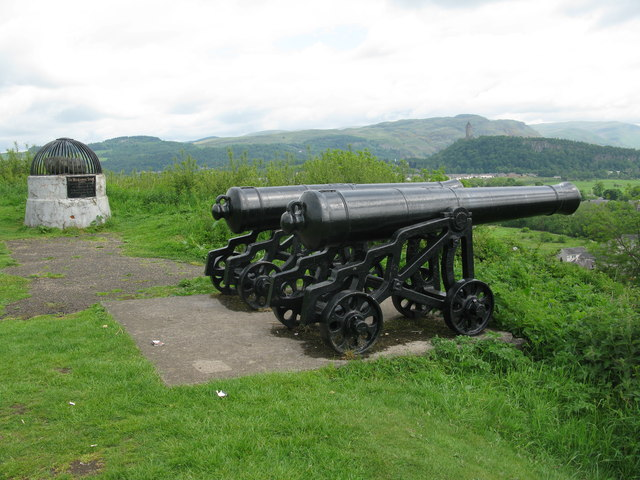
The Beheading Stone and cannons looking towards the Wallace Monument

Murdoch Stewart, Duke of Albany was reportedly executed on the hill on 24 May 1425. As was Robert Mentecht: On 16 October 1525, Robert Mentecht was convicted by the said assise and doom pronounced on him, to be taken to the “Heidden Hill” and the head to be stricken from the body, and the said doom was given by “Willie Forsycht, dempstar for the tyme.”
