= Drummonderinoch =

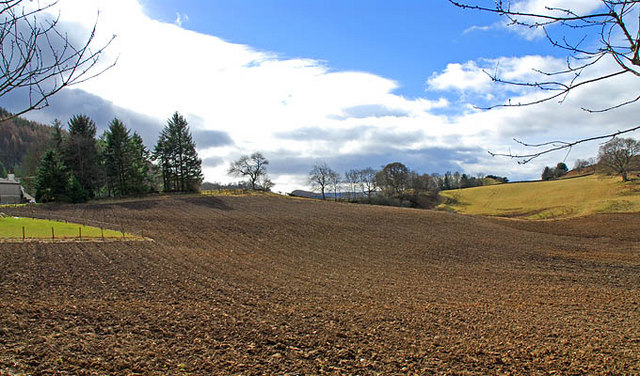
Farmland at Drummond Earnoch

Drummonderinoch is a place in Comrie, Perthshire, Scotland. Its modern name is Drummond Earnoch. The origin of the name comes from the tragic episode of the Massacre of Monzievaird on October 21, 1490.

One of its sons, John Drummond, came to a grisly end in Lochearnhead; his severed head inspired Sir Walter Scott’s tale, "A Legend of Montrose".
