= Balquhidder =

Village in Stirling, Scotland

Coordinates: 56.357°N 04.373°W

Balquhidder: Scottish Gaelic: Both Chuidir / Both Phuidir
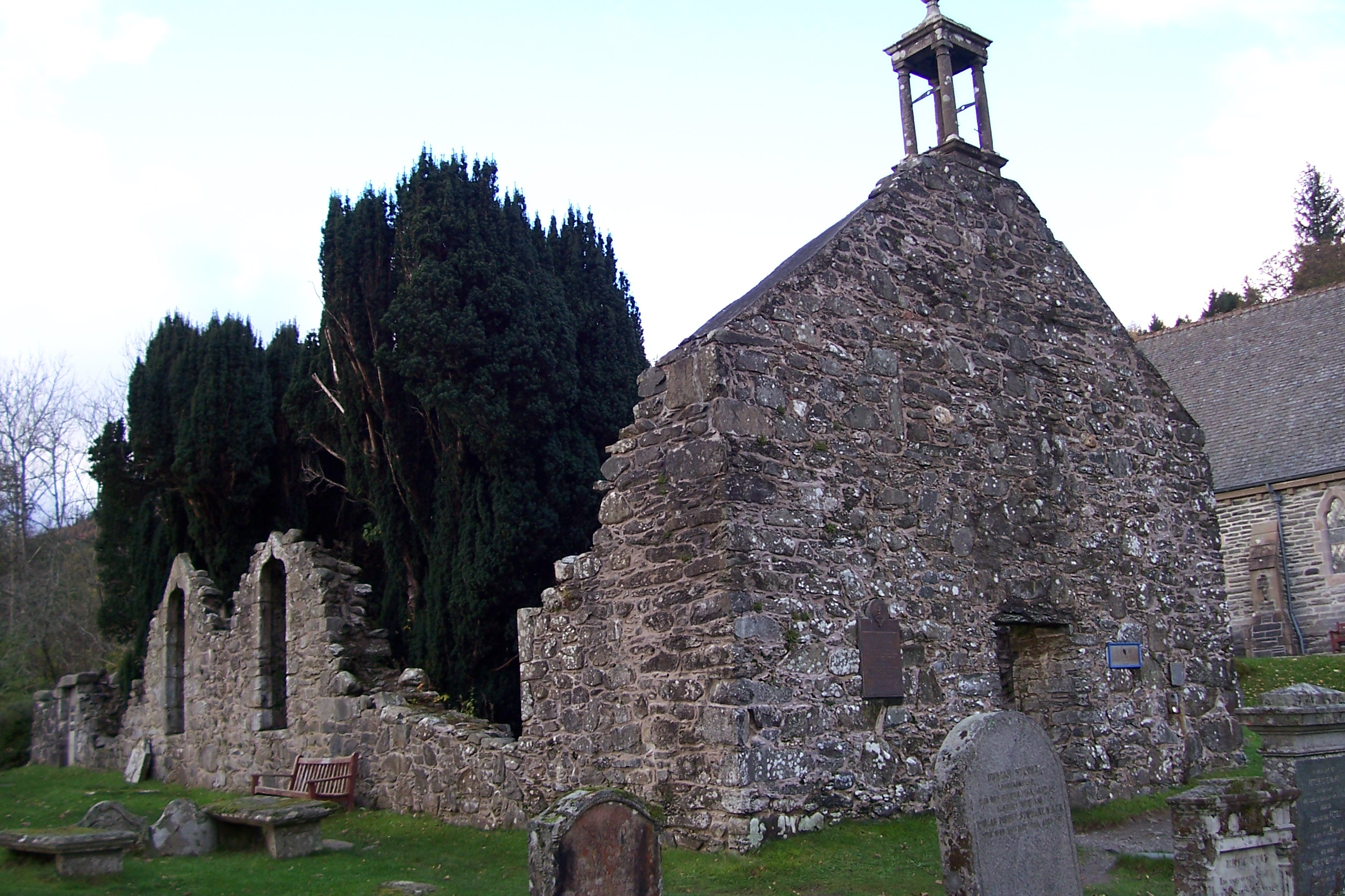
- Ruins of the former Balquhidder Church

- Location within the Stirling council area
- OS grid reference: NN533208
- Civil parish: Balquhidder
- Council area: Stirling
- Country: Scotland
- Sovereign state: United Kingdom
- Post town: Lochearnhead
- Postcode district: FK19
- Dialling code: 01877
- Police: Scotland
- Fire: Scottish
- Ambulance: Scottish
- UK Parliament: Stirling and Strathallan
- Scottish Parliament: Stirling

Balquhidder (Note: Pronounced /bælˈhwɪdər/ or /bælˈkwɪdər/.) (Scottish Gaelic: Both Chuidir [ˌpɔˈxutʲɪɾʲ] or Both Phuidir [ˌpɔˈfutʲɪɾʲ]) is a small village in Perthshire located 10 miles (16 km) north-west of Callander. It is administered by the Stirling council area of Scotland and is overlooked by the dramatic mountain terrain of the "Braes of Balquhidder", at the head of Loch Voil. Balquhidder Glen is also popular for fishing, nature watching and walking.

== History ==
=== Middle Ages ===
St Angus came to Balquhidder Glen in the 8th or 9th century and recognised what the Celts called a "thin place", where the boundary between Earth and Heaven was close. He knelt and blessed the glen at the spot where the house "Beannach Aonghais" (Gaelic "blessing of Angus") now stands and built a stone oratory at Kirkton, where he spent the rest of his life. Angus was the first to bring Christianity to Balquhidder.

Balquhidder lies close to the Highland boundary and thus came earlier into the nominal ownership of lords possessing charters issued by the royal court in Edinburgh. The parish became crown land from 1436. Crown charters could mean nothing if not accepted by the people on the ground. Stewart of Baldorran was appointed baillie for the crown lands of Balquhidder in 1488 and his descendants remained. In 1500 and 1511, the parish was granted to court favourites.

In 1475, James III appointed Colin Campbell, 1st Earl of Argyll, as his Lieutenant, responsible for "good order" in areas which included Argyll & Lorn and, among other territories, Balquhidder. This authority was repeated by the crown for the Earl's successors in 1504, 1525 and 1549. By 1500, the Stewarts of Appin had become bound as vassals to the Earl of Argyll. In 1566, John Stewart, 5th of Appin signed bonds of manrent giving his allegiance to Colin Campbell of Glenorchy.

The descendants of a "Bishop Laurancii" or Labhruinn were recorded at Kildonan, Ardchattan on the North Shore of Loch Etive in 1420. These "descendants of Laurence" acquired the Gaelic name mhic Labhruinn (pronounced "VicLaurin" = MacLaurin), thus recalling their descent from a well known and probably respected clergyman. The Earls of Argyll settled people amenable to their authority, as they did elsewhere, often supplanting the earlier inhabitants. Thus, it appears probable that both the MacGregors and MacLaren/MacLaurin lineage from Appin were introduced to Balquhidder and other locations in Perthshire, around Loch Tay, as the result of Campbell expansion. The first documentary record of both MacLarens and MacGregors in Balquhidder was in the rentals for Invernentie in 1512.

Irish records provide a relationship between the chiefs of Clan Lahbran (MacLaren) and Kenneth MacAlpin who successfully united the Northern Picts into Scotland in 843–850. It is believed that the Balquhidder lands were passed to Donald Og, a relative of MacAlpin and he, subsequently, passed them to members of his family which include the MacLarens.

=== Early modern era ===
The Reverend Robert Kirk, who translated parts of the Gaelic Bible and wrote The Secret Commonwealth, also lived here for several years from 1664.

Rob Roy lived and died in Balquhidder. After his principal creditor, James Graham, 1st Duke of Montrose seized his lands, Rob Roy waged a private blood feud against the duke until 1722, when he was forced to surrender. Later imprisoned, he was finally pardoned in 1727. He died in his house at Inverlochlarig Beg, Balquhidder, on 28 December 1734.

Glen Buckie, now a quiet backwater on the south side of Balquhidder Glen was the scene of one of the last acts of the 1745 Jacobite rising. Dr Archibald "Archie" Cameron of Locheil had returned to Scotland in the early 1750s hoping to raise support for a possible last-ditch coup against George II. He was captured in the glen, and was later hanged in London, the last Jacobite to be executed for treason.

== Balquhidder today ==
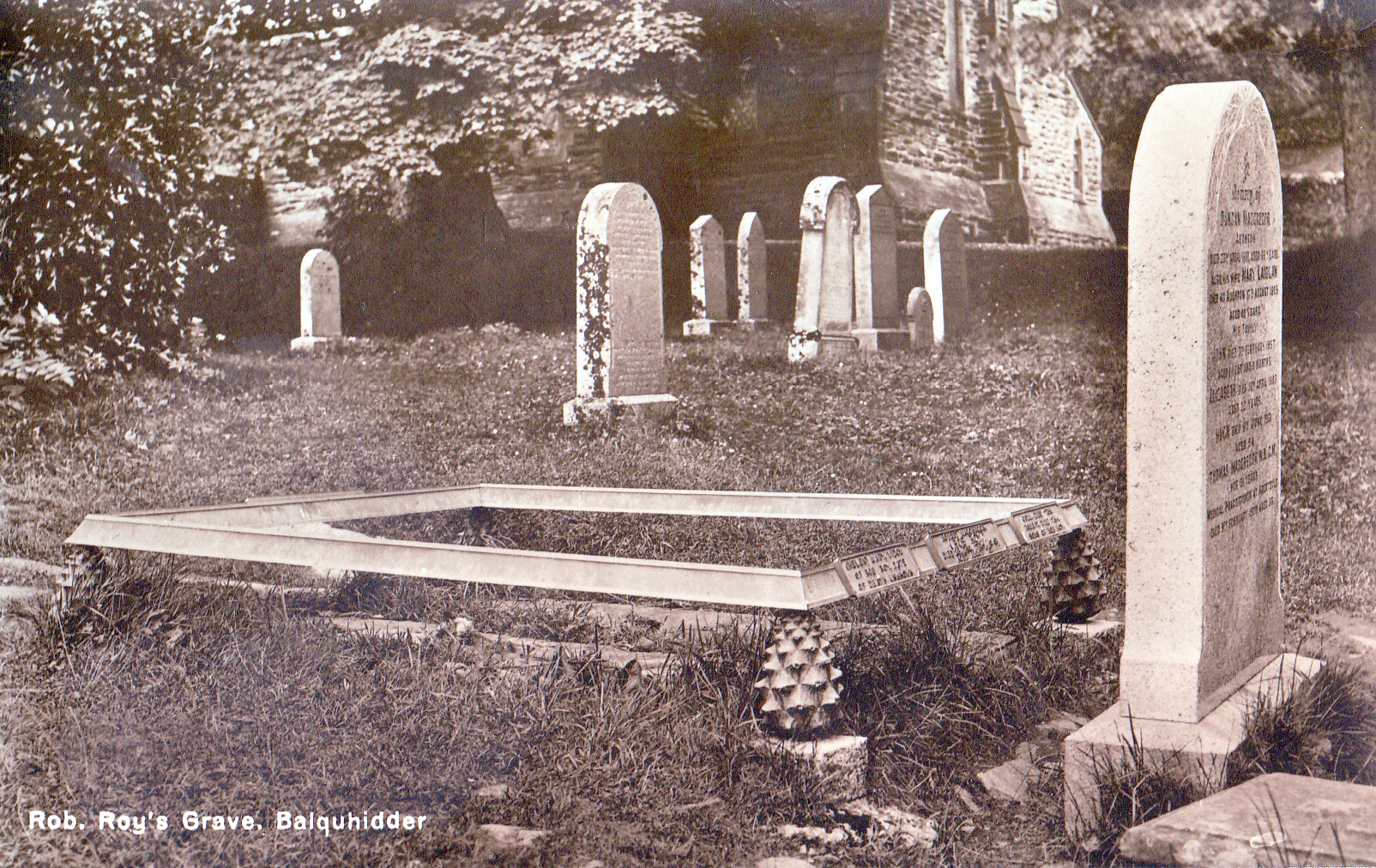
Rob Roy's Grave.Postcard c.1910–1920

The local kirkyard is the final resting place of Rob Roy; his grave is marked with the appropriately defiant motto "MacGregor Despite Them". He lies with the remains of his wife and two sons, the graves marked by three flat stones. One of these is contemporary, but the remaining two are re-used medieval grave monuments.

Behind the present kirk is Tom nan Angeae, the hill of fire, where until the 19th-century hearth fires were renewed at Beltane and Samhain to encourage ancient gods to bring warmth to the land. St Angus was buried at the foot of this hill and a flagstone laid over him which stands today in the present church. This stone, formerly in the floor of the medieval church, has a crudely incised figure of a priest holding a chalice. The carving is probably late medieval in date.

There are some foundations of the east end of the small medieval parish church of Balquhidder around the grave of Rob Roy and his family (which seem deliberately to have been buried at the site of its altar). A few metres to the west are the roofless ruins of this building's 17th-century successor. The present church, built on a new site to the north of the ancient graveyard, is of 19th-century date. As well as the slab attributed to St Angus, the ancient, primitive font, probably of early medieval origin, is preserved in this building. There is a display on the history of Balquhidder in the church, which is open to the public during the summer, when there is also a programme of evening concerts in the building.

The Callander and Oban Railway reached Balquhidder in 1871 but the line closed in 1965. The site of Balquhidder railway station is now a holiday park with log cabins, caravans, camping etc.

Until 1993, Balquhidder had its own primary school, with a single teacher. Since this was closed, the children of the village have been schooled at Strathyre.

The name Balquhidder is commemorated in other Scottish areas of the world including South Australia. A large sheep property south of Adelaide is called Balquhidder. The village is also commemorated in song in a traditional Scottish air, "The Braes o' Balquhidder", written by Robert Tannahill (1774–1810) which appears in R. A. Smith's "Scottish Minstrel" (1821–1824) – Vol. I, p. 49 and Vol. IV, p. 89, and which has been recorded by the Tannahill Weavers, among others. The "Wild Mountain Thyme" is a variant of this song.

Anne Crosby Gaudet has arranged this tune for harp and you can hear it here: "The Braes of Balquhidder"

== Notable people associated with Balquhidder ==
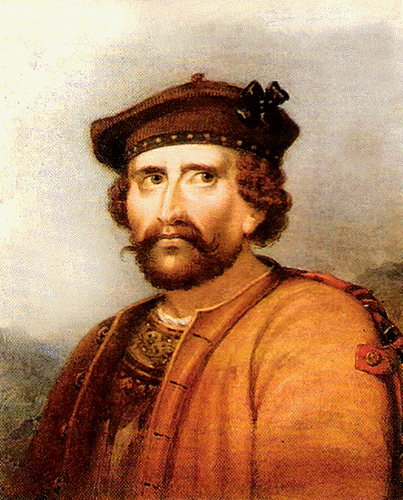
Portrait engraving of Rob Roy circa 1820s

- David Carnegie, who funded the construction of Sankta Birgittas kapell in Gothenburg, modelled on the Kirk in Balquhidder, where the Carnegies had a home
- William Stewart of Baldorran (c. 1440 – c. 1500), founder of the Balquhidder Stewart clan.
- Rob Roy MacGregor, 18th century Scottish patriot, folk hero and outlaw, sometimes known as the Scottish Robin Hood. He was buried in the Balquhidder kirkyard.
- James Cameron, movie director whose paternal great-great-great-grandfather emigrated from Balquhidder, Scotland, in 1825.
