= Isabella, Countess of Lennox =

Scottish countess (died 1458)

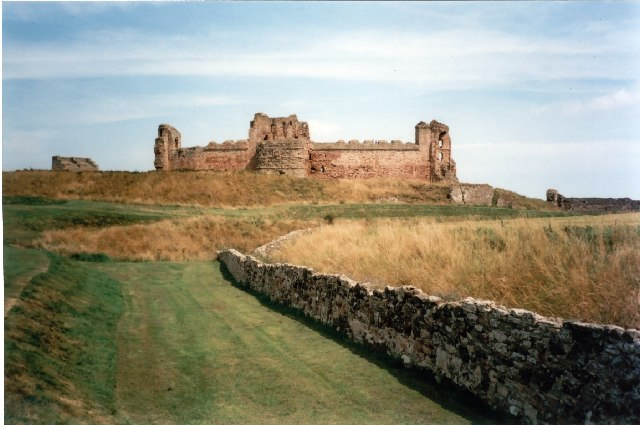
Tantallon Castle, where Isabella of Lennox was imprisoned for 8 years by King James I.

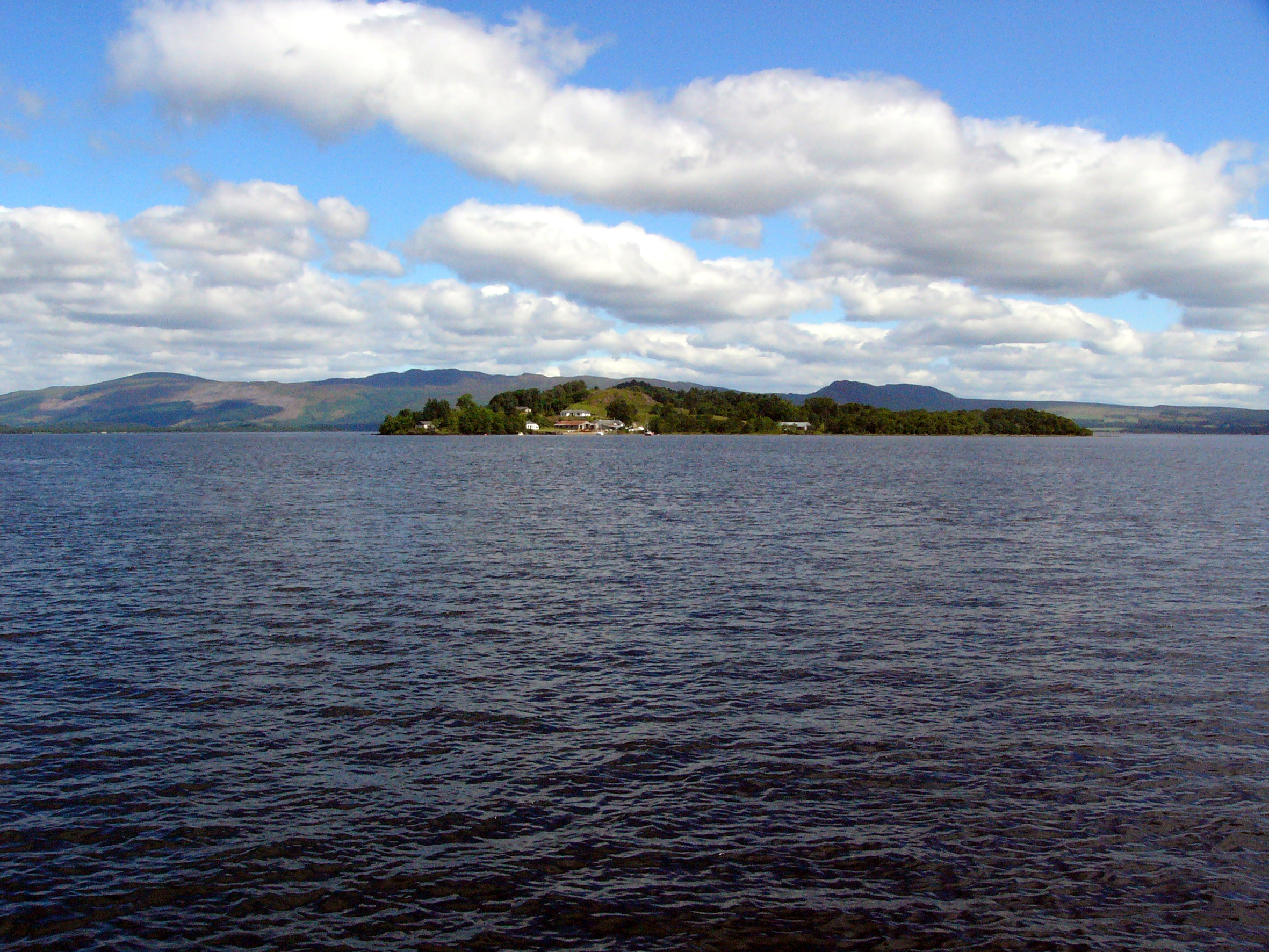
Inchmurrin, Loch Lomond, where Isabella retired after her release from Tantallon Castle.

Isabella of Lennox (died 1458) was the ruler of Lennox, at least from 1437 to 1458, and last in the line of Mormaers or native Scottish rulers. As the wife of Murdoch Stewart, 2nd Duke of Albany (died 1425), she was also Duchess of Albany (1420–1425), but in 1425 her family would be almost completely destroyed when her husband, father and two sons were executed by King James I of Scotland because of their rebellion. Only one son, James the Fat, would escape their family's punishment, and he would die in exile in Ireland. Isabella succeeded in escaping the fate of her family, and would eventually regain her title and estates, retiring to her castle in Loch Lomond where she raised her grandchildren. She would eventually live to see the assassination of her family's opponent, King James. Though none of her four sons survived her, her grandson Andrew Stewart, 1st Lord Avandale, became Lord Chancellor of Scotland.

== Early life ==
Isabella was the daughter of Donnchadh, Earl of Lennox and Helena, the daughter of Sir Archibald Campbell. Her father Duncan sought to create powerful links with the great Robert Stewart, 1st Duke of Albany, who was the second son of King Robert II by his first wife Elizabeth Mure of Rowallan, and who was to a certain extent the de facto ruler of Scotland, at points during the reigns of his father and elder brother. In 1392, Duncan agreed to marry Isabella to Robert's son, Murdoch Stewart.

Murdoch and Isabella did marry, and had at least five children:

- Robert (died 1421)
- Walter (died 1425)
- Alasdair (died 1425)
- James/Seamas Mòr (died 1429; some sources say 1449)
- Isabel, who married Sir Walter Buchanan, 13th Laird of Buchanan

== Trial of 1425 ==
Disaster struck Isabella's family when her husband, father, and sons Walter and Alasdair were tried for treason after her other son, James the Fat, raised a rebellion against the king, marched on Dumbarton, burned it, and killed the keeper of the royal castle there, Sir John Stewart of Dundonald, who was the King's uncle, along with the castle garrison. This led a jury composed of 21 knights and Peers to find her husband and two sons guilty of treason for which they were executed. James the Fat escaped the King's justice in 1425, escaping to Antrim, Ireland, where he would spend the rest of his life in exile. Isabella and her daughter survived the results of the rebellion by the Albany Stewarts, which almost obliterated her family, but she was forced to spend eight years as a royal hostage at Tantallon Castle. James died in 1429, prior to an abortive attempt to once again try to steal the throne of Scotland. Confusingly, some sources give his date of death as 1449. 1429 is the most common date given.

== Death of James I ==
Isabella lived to see James I of Scotland assassinated in February 1437 in a failed coup by his kinsman and former ally Walter Stewart, Earl of Atholl. Walter Stewart, who had been on the jury that condemned her husband to death for treason also suffered a gruesome death soon afterward. He and his co-conspirators against the King were attainted and put to death in Edinburgh by a series of tortures for regicide.

== Restoration of her lands and title ==
Isabella was released from Tantallon in 1433. At least by 1437, the year King James was assassinated, Isabella had recovered her lands and title. In the next few years, although forced to govern her province from her castle at Inchmurrin, Loch Lomond, she issued a large numbers of charters, was popular in the province, and was tolerated by King James II. At some point after she regained her liberty, Isabella brought her young grandchildren to be raised at her castle at Inchmurrin

Isabella was described by Mark Napier, writing in 1835, as being:

"reserved and lofty in her demeanor, possessing a strong mind, a calm and indomitable spirit; and no lady of ancient or modern times ever stood more in need of such attributes to sustain her under sudden and violent calamities".

== Death and legacy ==
When Isabella herself died in 1458, having outlived her enemies, the oldest continuous Gaelic mormaerdom came to an end.

None of Isabella's four sons outlived her, but her grandchildren did survive. Among them was Andrew Stewart, 1st Lord Avondale, son of Walter Stewart, born in Antrim, Ireland. He became Lord of Avondale in 1459, and Lord Chancellor of Scotland in the same year, becoming one of the leading servants of King James III of Scotland. He would hold the office of Chancellor for 25 years, dying in 1488.

== Bibliography ==
- Brown, Michael, "Earldom and Kindred: The Lennox and Its Earls, 1200–1458" in Steve Boardman and Alasdair Ross (eds.) The Exercise of Power in Medieval Scotland, c.1200–1500, (Dublin/Portland, 2003), pp. 201–224
- Napier, Mark, History of the Partition of the Lennox (1835) Retrieved November 2010

== Notes ==
Preceded by Donnchadh	Mormaer of Lennox; 1437–1458	Extinct
