= A Legend of Montrose =

1819 novel by Walter Scott

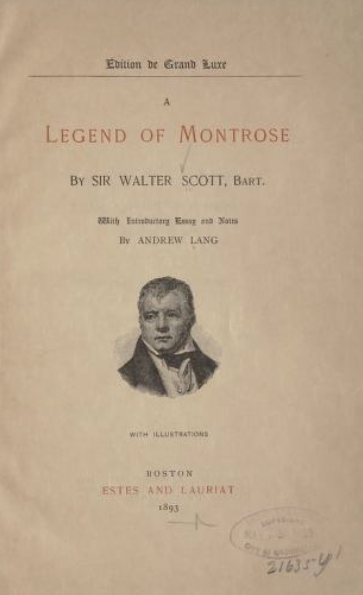
- Title page for A Legend of Montrose (1893 edition)
- Author: Walter Scott
- Language: English, Lowland Scots
- Series: Waverley Novels; Tales of my Landlord, Third Series
- Genre: Historical novel
- Publisher: Archibald Constable (Edinburgh); Longman, Hurst, Rees, Orme, and Brown, and Hurst, Robinson, and Co. (London)
- Publication date: 21 June 1819
- Publication place: Scotland
- Media type: Print
- Pages: 183 (Edinburgh Edition, 1993)
- Preceded by: The Bride of Lammermoor
- Followed by: Ivanhoe

A Legend of Montrose is a historical novel by Sir Walter Scott, set in Scotland in the 1640s during the Wars of the Three Kingdoms. It forms, along with The Bride of Lammermoor, the 3rd series of Scott's Tales of My Landlord. The two novels were published together in 1819.

The story takes place during the Earl of Montrose's 1644-5 military campaign in Scotland on behalf of King Charles I against the Covenanters who had sided with the Parliament of England in the English Civil War. In the novel, two soldiers in Montrose's army fall for the same woman. One of the men stabs his rival and then disappears.

== Plot summary ==
The story takes place during the Earl of Montrose's 1644-5 military campaign in Scotland on behalf of King Charles I against the Covenanters who had sided with the Parliament of England in the English Civil War.

=== Earl of Montrose ===
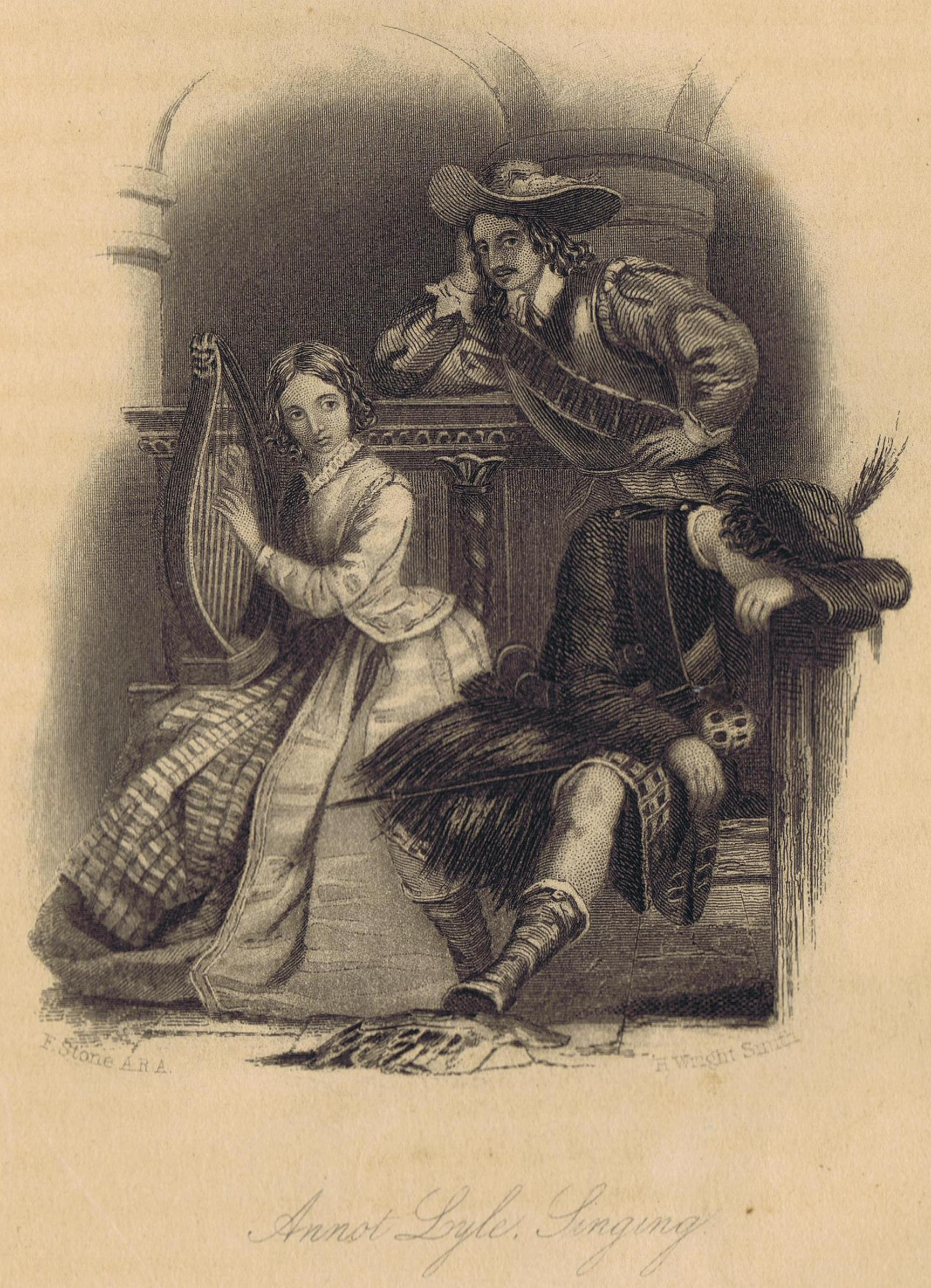
Illustration of Annot Lyle Singing in 1872 edition by H Wright Smith

The main plot concerns a love triangle between Allan M'Aulay, his friend the Earl of Menteith, and Annot Lyle. Annot is a young woman who has been brought up by the M'Aulays since being captured as a girl during a blood feud against the MacEagh clan (also known as the Children of the Mist). M'Aulay and Menteith are both members of Montrose's army. Annot eventually marries Menteith after it is discovered that she has aristocratic blood, and was kidnapped by the MacEaghs as a baby. This leads to the jealous M'Aulay stabbing Menteith and then fleeing Montrose's army. Menteith survives whilst M'Aulay disappears and is rumoured to have been killed by the MacEaghs.

=== Dalgetty ===
A large section of the novel is taken up with a subplot involving an expedition into enemy territory by Dugald Dalgetty, an experienced mercenary fighting for Montrose. Dalgetty does not fight out of political or religious conviction, but purely for the love of carnage. However, he is very professional, and remains loyal to an employer to the end of his contract. He gained his experience fighting for various armies during the Thirty Years' War (1618–48), then still raging in Germany. Dalgetty is regarded as one of Scott's finest comic characters, however Scott admitted that he dominated too much of the story. He wrote in an 1830 introduction to the novel, "Still Dalgetty, as the production of his own fancy, has been so far a favourite with its parent, that he has fallen into the error of assigning to the Captain too prominent a part in the story."

== Characters ==
(principal characters in bold)

- The Earl of Menteith
- **Anderson**, his servant; afterwards revealed as the Earl of Montrose
- **Dugald Dalgetty**, of Drumthwacket
- **Angus MacAulay** of Darnlinvarach castle, laird of Kintail
- **Allan**, his brother
- Sir Miles Mulgrave and Sir Christopher Hall, his guests
- Donald, one of his servants
- The Children of the Mist, freebooters
- Evan Dhu, of Lochiel
- **Sir Duncan Campbell**, of Ardenvohr
- Lady Campbell, his wife
- **Annot Lyle**, afterwards revealed as his daughter
- Lorimer, one of his servants
- **MacCallan More, Marquis of Argyle**
- **Ranald MacEagh**, a son of the Mist
- **Kenneth**, his grandson
- MacIlduy, chieftain of the Camerons

== Chapter summary ==
Introduction: The narrator [Peter Pattieson] indicates that he received the tale that follows from a resident of Gandercleugh, the retired Serjeant More MacAlpin.

Ch. 1: A sketch of the political situation in late 17th-century Scotland.

Ch. 2: The mercenary soldier Dugald Dalgetty encounters the Earl of Menteith on the borders of the Highlands and tells him of his service on the Continent.

Ch. 3: Menteith and his servant Anderson outline to Dalgetty the advantages for a mercenary of serving in the Royalist interest.

Ch. 4: Arriving at Darnlinvarach castle, Menteith and Anderson exchange views on Dalgetty. Allan MacAulay seats Anderson above Dalgetty at table. His brother, the laird Angus, wins a wager with his guest Sir Miles Musgrave by having some of his men act as living chandeliers.

Ch. 5: Menteith tells Dalgetty the story of Allan's feud with the Children of the Mist, and of his reluctant sparing of Annot Lyle and subsequent fondness for her.

Ch. 6: Dalgetty agrees to serve with the Royalists. Annot soothes Allan by singing. He foresees that Menteith will be stabbed by a Highlander.

Ch. 7: The Royalist chiefs arrive with their retinues, and Menteith reveals Montrose, alias Anderson, as their leader.

Ch. 8: Sir Duncan Campbell arrives with a proposal from the Marquis of Argyle for a truce, and Dalgetty is selected to go to Inverara to negotiate terms.

Volume Two

Ch. 1 (9): After debating the political situation with Allan and Menteith, Campbell is affected by Annot's singing.

Ch. 2 (10): As they arrive at Ardenvohr castle, Dalgetty and Campbell discuss its defensive capabilities.

Ch. 3 (11): Dalgetty is struck by Lady Campbell's gloomy demeanour at dinner, and afterwards the servant Lorimer explains that it is the anniversary of the murder of the four Campbell children by Highland freebooters. Dalgetty travels to Inverara.

Ch. 4 (12): Dalgetty receives a hostile reception from Argyle.

Ch. 5 (13): Imprisoned in a dungeon, Dalgetty meets Ranald MacEagh, who says he killed three of Campbell's four children, but one survives. Argyle enters in disguise and ascertains that the surviving child is Annot. Dalgetty recognises Argyle and overpowers him, enabling Ranald and himself to escape.

Ch. 6 (14): Joining the Children of the Mist with Ranald, Dalgetty is wounded by the pursuers from Inverara.

Ch. 7 (15): Montrose enjoys military success, leading Argyle to relinquish his command of the Covenanting forces and retire to Inverara.

Ch. 8 (16): Dalgetty and Ranald report to Montrose on the Children of the Mist, who will be able to help in an advance to the west.

Ch. 9 (17): Montrose assigns Kenneth, Ranald's grandson, to Dalgetty's service. Ranald, introduced by Dalgetty under a fictitious name, and Allan bond as seers. Musgrave announces that Annot is following the campaign. Ranald tells Allan that it is he (Allan) who will stab Menteith. Montrose takes Inverara, leading to a counter-movement by Argyle.

Ch. 10 (18): Both sides make preparations for battle at Inverlochy.

Ch. 11 (19): Argyle is defeated at Inverlochy, where Dalgetty's horse Gustavus is killed. Dalgetty intervenes when Allan wounds Ranald, who has revealed his identity, and subsequently Dalgetty is knighted.

Ch. 12 (20): Dalgetty goes off to seek booty after the battle. Menteith tells Montrose that he does not plan to woo Annot because of doubts about her parentage. Allan reproaches Annot for loving Menteith rather than himself.

Ch. 13 (21): Annot regrets that Allan has disturbed her quiet. Dalgetty summons her to attend to Campbell who was mortally wounded in the battle. Ranald reveals the secret of her parentage to Campbell and Menteith.

Ch. 14 (22): The dying Ranald instructs Kenneth to torment Allan by telling him that Menteith plans to marry Annot. Montrose fails to dissuade Menteith from pressing his suit, and Campbell agrees that the wedding should take place.

Ch. 15 (23): Angus MacAulay is offended by the match but promises Montrose not to interfere. Allan stabs Menteith on the wedding day, but he survives to marry after a few weeks, and Allan passes into obscurity.

== Composition ==
A Legend of the Wars of Montrose was composed during May 1819, immediately after the completion of its companion novel The Bride of Lammermoor though it had been envisaged before the Bride was begun. Scott was still recovering from his serious illness of March 1819 and it is likely that the greater part of the new novel was dictated to John Ballantyne and William Laidlaw, though the manuscript for most of Chapters 3 to 6 is extant in his own hand.

== Editions ==
The first edition of Tales of my Landlord (Third Series), consisting of The Bride of Lammermoor and A Legend of Montrose (the title reluctantly accepted by Scott), was published by Archibald Constable in Edinburgh on 21 June 1819 and in London by Longman, Hurst, Rees, Orme, and Brown on the 26th. As with all of the Waverley novels before 1827 publication was anonymous. The print run was probably 10,000 and the price was £1 12s (£1.60). Scott appears to have made some small changes to the text of Montrose when it appeared later that year in the Novels and Tales, but his main revision was carried out in late 1829 and early 1830 for the 'Magnum' edition, including the provision of notes and an introduction: it appeared as Volume 15 in August 1830.

The standard modern edition, by J. H. Alexander, was published under Scott's preferred title A Legend of the Wars of Montrose as Volume 7b of the Edinburgh Edition of the Waverley Novels in 1993: this is based on the first edition with emendations principally from Scott's manuscript; the new Magnum material is included in Volume 25a.

== Reception ==
A Legend of Montrose shared in the mixed reception with its companion novel by reviewers with their tendency to lament the familiar stylistic carelessness and weak plotting, and some reviewers saw a distinct decline from the preceding novels, with signs of exhaustion and less interesting subject matter. But several reviewers found the depiction of seventeenth-century Highland society fascinating. Ranald MacEagh and Annot Lyle attracted praise, though The Edinburgh Magazine found the former incongruously Byronic. Dalgetty was widely recognised as a great comic creation, but the severe Monthly Review found him uniform and always present, extravagant in character and disgraceful in his views. The battle scene came in for praise from more than one reviewer. Comparisons between Montrose and The Bride of Lammermoor resulted in no overall winner.

== Sources and inspiration ==
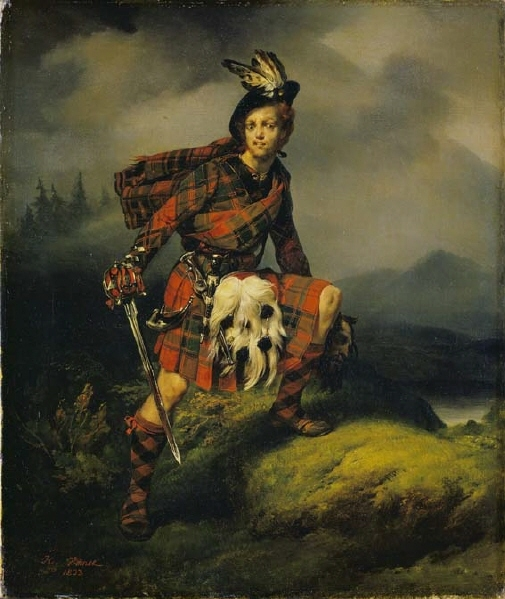
Allan M'Aulay, by Horace Vernet, 1823. M'Aulay holds the severed head of Hector MacEagh. This scene is not depicted in the novel.

By far the most important source was a book with a very long title beginning Monro his Expedition ... by Robert Monro (1637) which was crucial for the development of Dugald Dalgetty. Also helpful for this character were Memoirs of his own Life and Times by Sir James Turner (which was not published till 1829, but Scott had access to the manuscript in 1819), and the same author's Pallas Armata (1683). For Montrose, Scott's main source was Memoirs of the Most Renowned James Graham, Marquis of Montrose by George Wishart (1647). The Ardvoirlich story Scott knew from oral tradition, but he was also indebted to its appearance in Clan-Alpin's Vow by Alexander Boswell of Auchinleck (1811). Dalgetty's name is derived from Captain Delgatty of Prestonpans, an acquaintance of Scott. Menteith is based upon John Graham, Lord Kilpoint (1613–1644). Evan Dhu represents Ewen Cameron of Lochiel (1629–1719).

Several parts of the novel are influenced by traditions concerning the Stewarts of Ardvorlich, specifically James Stewart of Ardvorlich. The Ardvoirlich story Scott knew from oral tradition, but he was also indebted to its appearance in Clan-Alpin's Vow by Alexander Boswell of Auchinleck (1811). The novel's castle of Darnlinvarach is commonly said to represent Ardvorlich House. The latter actually appears in the novel as the castle of Ardenvohr, which may be somewhat based upon Dunstaffnage Castle.

The following story of murder provided inspiration. In the seventeenth century it was the custom to provide hospitality to anyone who asked for food and shelter. If the guest was not a friend, they were still put up, but instead of a cooked meal were given cold meat (this is where the phrase "given the cold shoulder" comes from). In accordance with this custom, Lady Margaret Stewart at Ardvorlich, pregnant at the time, gave hospitality to some travelling MacGregors. However, they had just come from murdering her brother, John Drummond of Drummonderinoch, and while she was out of the room they placed his severed head on a silver platter, and placed in his mouth some of the cold victuals she had served them. She was so distraught that she ran out to the hills and gave birth to James Stewart, later known as the "Mad Major". The Loch she gave birth by is now known as Lochan na Mna, the Loch of the Woman, on the side of Beinn Domhnuill.

Major James Stewart, 2nd Laird of Ardvorlich (the "Mad Major"), was one of the great historical characters of the Covenanting Wars and was the inspiration for Allan M'Aulay. This name is actually engraved on the foot of Major Stewart's gravestone in the Stewarts of Ardvorlich old kirk of Dundurn just outside the village of St Fillans on the shores of Loch Earn.

The City of Montrose, Colorado was named after the novel

== Purpose ==
P. D. Garside of the University of Edinburgh has argued that Scott intended the novel to highlight the changing nature of warfare in the seventeenth century, showing how the lack of a professional army caused the “civilized” society of the Lowlands to become “temporarily vulnerable to the ‘barbarous’” society of the Highlands. He cites Chapter 15 as particularly important in this regard.
