= Crianlarich Hills =

Group of mountains in Scotland

Coordinates: 56°22′N 4°32′W

The Crianlarich Hills are a large group of mountains in Scotland, running east of Crianlarich and Loch Lomond, south of Strath Fillan and north of Loch Doine. The range is within the Breadalbane section of Loch Lomond and the Trossachs National Park and contains the highest mountains in the park. The mountains also are located in an area where the landscape becomes ever more remote and mountainous as landscapes go further into a wilderness starting from Tarbet on Loch Lomond. The highest mountain in the range is Ben More, which is also the highest in the national park and is one of the highest in Scotland.

The mountains of the range include the seven Munros:

- Ben More, 1,174 m (3,852 ft)
- Stob Binnein, 1,165 m (3,822 ft)
- Cruach Ardrain, 1,046 m (3,432 ft)
- An Caisteal, 995 m (3,264 ft)
- Beinn Tulaichean, 946 m (3,104 ft)
- Beinn a' Chroin, 942 m (3,091 ft)
- Beinn Chabhair, 933 m (3,061 ft)

== See also ==
- List of Munros#Section one: Firth of Clyde to Strath Tay
