= Broadalbin =

Broadalbin may refer to:

- Breadalbane, Scotland, archaically spelt Broadalbin (Broad Albin)
- Broadalbin, New York
- Broadalbin (village), New York
- Hotel Broadalbin, historic hotel in Broadalbin, New York

== See also ==
- Breadalbane
