= Strathyre =

Coordinates: 56.324°N 4.329°W

Strathyre: Scottish Gaelic: An t-Iomaire Riabhach
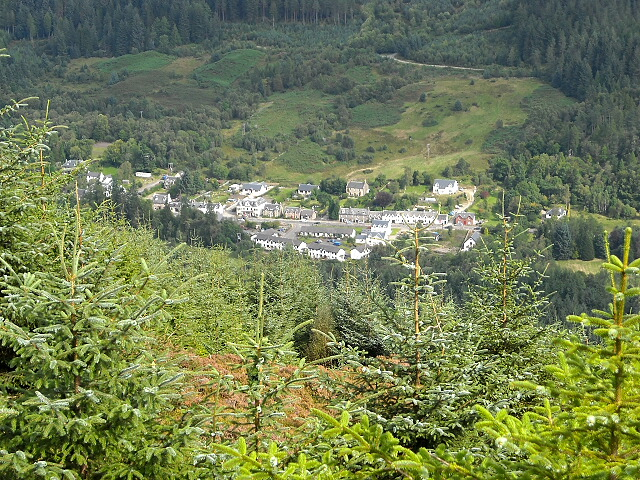
- The village of Strathyre

- Location within the Stirling council area
- OS grid reference: NN559172
- Civil parish: Balquhidder
- Council area: Stirling
- Lieutenancy area: Stirling and Falkirk
- Country: Scotland
- Sovereign state: United Kingdom
- Post town: CALLANDER
- Postcode district: FK18
- Dialling code: 01877
- Police: Scotland
- Fire: Scottish
- Ambulance: Scottish
- UK Parliament: Stirling and Strathallan
- Scottish Parliament: Stirling

Strathyre (/ˌstræθˈaɪər/; from Scottish Gaelic: Srath Eadhair) is a district and settlement in the Stirling local government district of Scotland. It forms the south-eastern part of the parish of Balquhidder and was, prior to the 1973 reorganisation of local government, part of Perthshire. It is within the bounds of the Loch Lomond and the Trossachs National Park. In Gaelic, the district is Srath Eadhair and the village is An t-Iomaire Riabhach or an t-Iomaire Fada.

== Location ==
The district of Strathyre extends from east of Balquhidder, following the River Balvaig which flows out of Loch Voil, almost due south to Loch Lubnaig. The River Balvaig is 8 kilometres in length, almost all of which lies in Strathyre. It falls by around 5 metres between Loch Voil and Loch Lubnaig. The A84 road and the route of the former Callander and Oban Railway run through the strath, as does the old 18th-century military road. The village is also on National Cycle Network Route 7 which connects Balloch on the southern banks of Loch Lomond with Aberfoyle, Strathyre, Callander, Lochearnhead and Killin.

The Strathyre Forest, which extends well beyond the limits of Strathyre proper, is managed by the Forestry Commission, forming the easternmost part of the Queen Elizabeth Forest Park.

== Literary associations ==
In September 1803 William Wordsworth and his sister Dorothy stayed in the village and took walks in the local hills. Wordsworth was inspired to write his poem The Solitary Reaper following his stay in the village.

== Musical associations ==
Bonnie Strathyre is a Scottish folk song inspired by the village. It has been recorded by numerous artists including Kenneth McKellar.

Every year in early summer a music festival called the Strathyre Festival is held in the village.

== Growth ==
The village of Strathyre is largely a Victorian creation, having grown up with the arrival of the Callander and Oban Railway in the 1870s and the establishment of Strathyre railway station. The trainline and railway station closed in 1965. The resident population recorded by the United Kingdom Census 2001 was around 100. The village is a popular tourist centre, with nearby caravan parks, camp sites and chalets, and canoeing, cycling and walking facilities.

== School ==
Strathyre has a small primary school with 40 pupils on the roll, drawn from a catchment area which includes Balquhidder. Gaelic is taught in the infant school, French in the upper primary. Local children normally travel to McLaren High School in Callander for their secondary education.
