= Cruach Ardrain =

Mountain of the Scottish Highlands

Coordinates: 56.35532°N 4.57755°W

Cruach Àrdrain
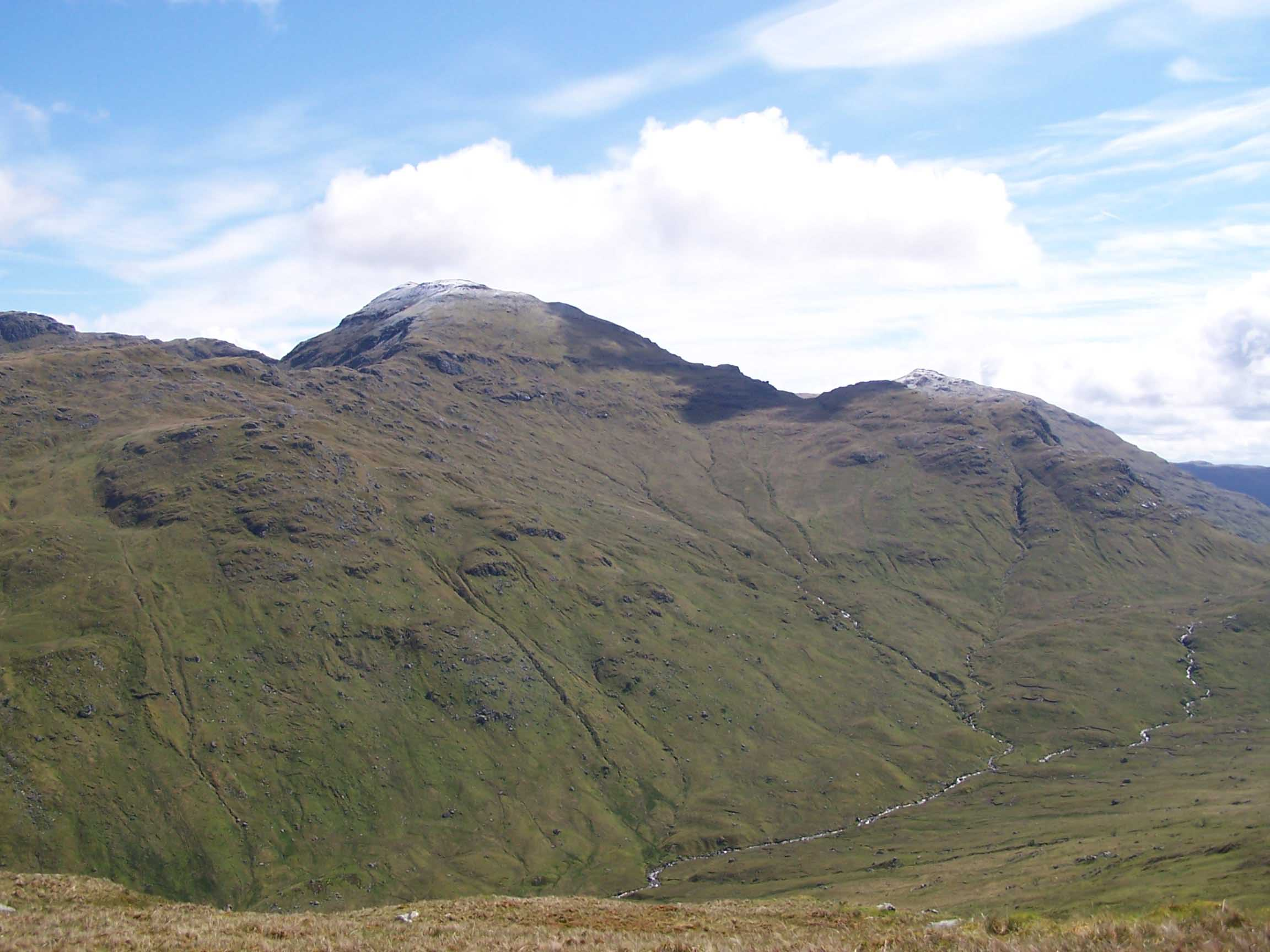
- Cruach Ardrain seen across Coire Earb from high up on An Caisteal.

Highest point
- Elevation: 1,046 m (3,432 ft)
- Prominence: 549 m (1,801 ft)
- Parent peak: Ben More
- Listing: Munro, Marilyn

Naming
- Language of name: Gaelic
- Pronunciation: Scottish Gaelic: [ˈkʰɾuəx ˈaːrˠt̪ɾɛɲ]

Geography
- Location: Stirlingshire, Scotland
- Parent range: Grampians
- OS grid: NN409212
- Topo map: OS Landranger 51, 56 OS Explorer 364

Listed summits of Cruach Ardrain
Name	Grid ref	Height	Status
Stob Garbh	NN411221	959 m (3146 ft)	Munro Top

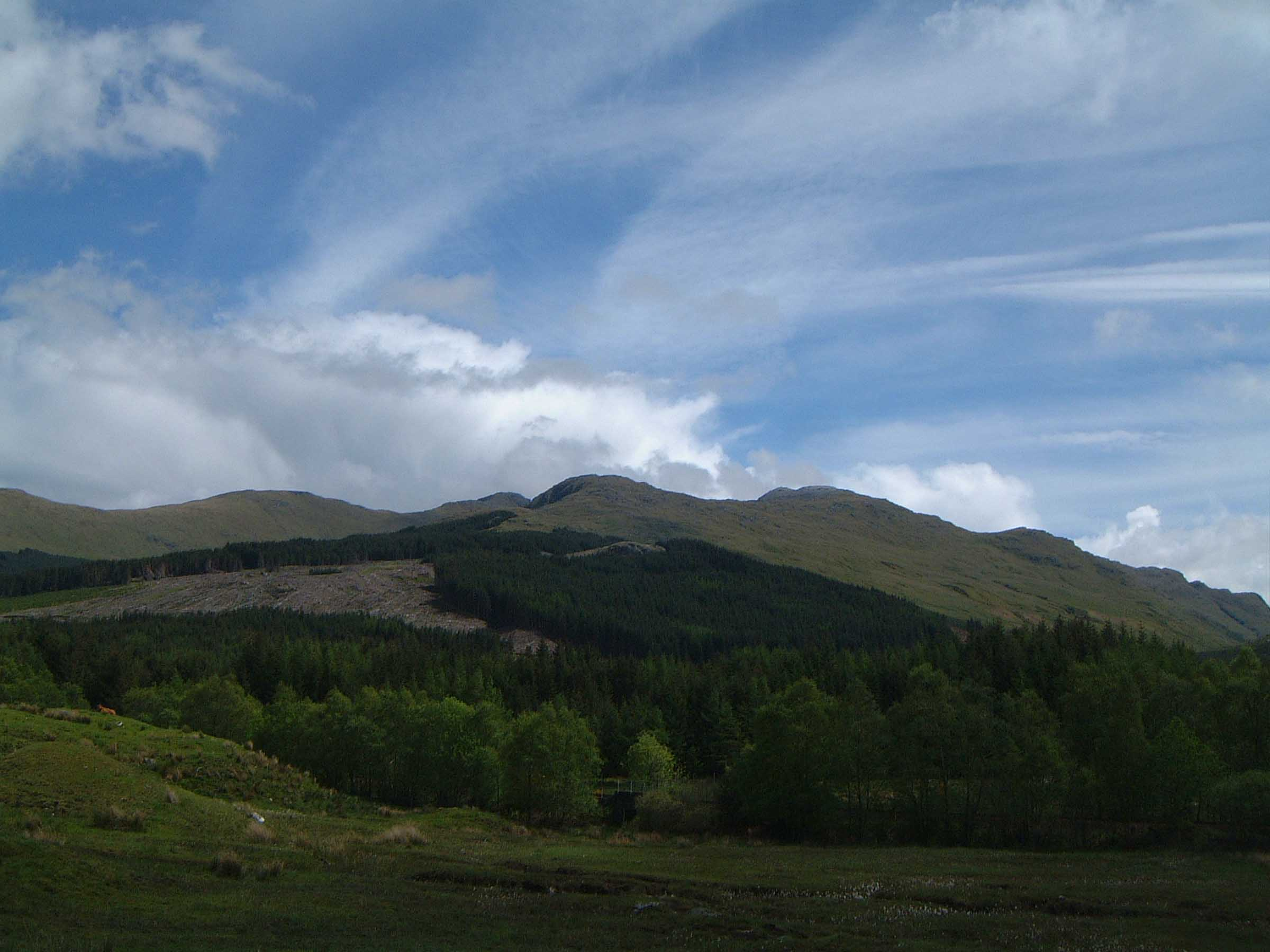
Cruach Ardrain from the A82 road in Glen Falloch. The plantations on the NW ridge are being felled.

Cruach Ardrain is a Munro mountain in the Breadalbane region of the Scottish Highlands, with a height of 1,046 metres (3,432 feet). It is five kilometres southeast of Crianlarich village and is one of the Crianlarich Hills.

== Name ==
The Gaelic name Cruach Àrdrain may come from Cruach Àrd-dhobhrain, meaning "stack of the high water or high stream". It overlooks Coire Ardrain, from which a stream flows into the River Fillan at Inverardran. Other suggested meanings include "stack of the high part", "high heap", "high mound" and "high slopes".

== Landscape ==
Cruach Ardrain is clearly delineated to the west by the upper valley of the River Falloch (Coire Earb) and to the east by the Benmore and Inverlochlarig glens and is one of the more distinctive of the group of mountains that stand in Glen Falloch. Cruach Ardrain's Y shape is formed by three ridges which go north, north west and south. The southern ridge links to the adjoining Munro of Beinn Tulaichean which lies two kilometres away across a high col at 825 metres. Cruach Ardrain and Beinn Tulaichean are often climbed together in the same walk. A spur goes south west off the south ridge to the subsidiary top of Stob Glas (815 metres) before continuing to link with the Munro of Beinn a' Chroin, however care is needed as Stob Glas is steep and rocky. The north and north east ridges encircle the extensive Coire Ardrain which is rocky at its head and forested on its lower slopes.

The head of Coire Ardrain contains Y Gully, a scrambler's route which leads directly to the summit and gives a fine ice climb (grade 1) in winter. Y Gully made the mountain popular with the early pioneers who enjoyed a challenging route to any summit. Another well known ice climb on the mountain is Hollow Gully which is located on the rocky spur of Stob Glas (c.820 metres) which lies 1 km south-southwest of the main summit.

Cruach Ardrain currently has one Munro “Top” located on its slopes, the 959 metre Stob Garbh (Rough Peak) situated 1 km away on the northern ridge. Stob Garbh lives up to its name by being rocky and needs care when being traversed. It can be by-passed on the west side but the path is steep and slippery and it is best to stick to the path over the crest. The original 1891 edition of Munro's Tables lists another Top at an intermediate point on the ridge, Stob Garbh South East Top at 925m. This Top was deleted in the 1921 edition. The north west ridge has two intermediate summits, Meall Dhamh (814 metres) and Grey Heights (686 metres), before dropping steeply to Glen Falloch through a conifer plantation.

== Naismith's rule ==
In May 1892 Scottish Mountaineer William W. Naismith devised Naismith's rule while walking over Cruach Ardrain on the way to the neighbouring mountain of Ben More. The rule is a simple formula for estimating walking time taking into account not just distance but also height to be ascended.

== Summit and climbing ==
A popular horseshoe ridge walk taking in the mountain starts and finishes in Crianlarich village. The summit of Cruach Ardrain has two high points of similar same height, roughly 250 metres apart. Current Ordnance survey maps give a spot height of 1046m for the north east top but no height for the south west top. Older imperial maps show a 3428 ft spot height (1045m) for the SW top but no height for the NE top. Sir Hugh Munro chose the NE Top for the 1891 list with the comment “The Westerly top is given on the 6in OS as 3429; the easterly, -77, the first two figures being obliterated. The height is probably therefore 3477 as above, as it is only slightly higher than the westerly top”. The 1901 edition of the 6 inch (1:10560) map showed that the “-77” height was in fact 3377 ft and therefore merely a point on the ridge. Accordingly, the Munro summit was moved to the SW top in the 1921 edition of Munro's Tables. This was reversed in 1981 when the 1046m spot height appeared on the 1976 1:25,000 map. The two high points are separated by a shallow depression at about 1031m with the current summit having a large cairn.

The most popular ascent of Cruach Ardrain starts at Crianlarich and uses the north and north west ridges as routes of ascent and descent. The north ridge is often recommended for ascent as it gives an exhilarating scramble over the “Top” of Stob Garbh, leaving the north west ridge for descent. The plantations at the foot of the NW ridge can be awkward to navigate but breaks in the forest do exist. A southern approach on mostly grassy slopes is possible from the roadhead before Inverlochlarig at NN445184.
