= An Caisteal =

Mountain in Scotland

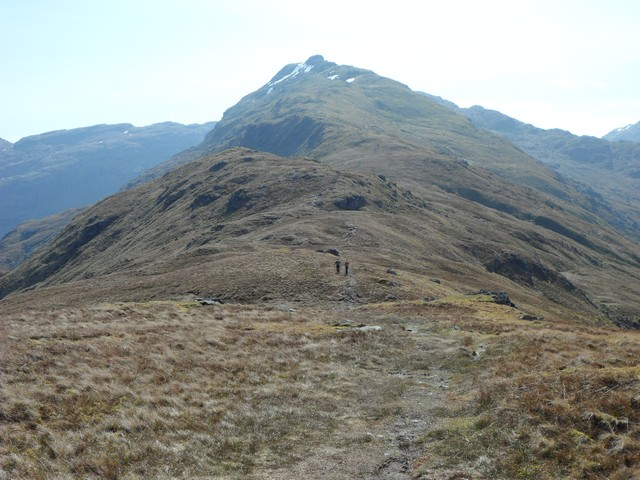
- Looking over Twistin Hill to the summit of An Caisteal.

Highest point
- Elevation: 995 m (3,264 ft)
- Prominence: 472 m (1,549 ft)
- Parent peak: Cruach Ardrain
- Listing: Munro, Marilyn
- Coordinates: 56°20′21″N 4°37′30″W

Naming
- English translation: the castle
- Language of name: Gaelic
- Pronunciation: Scottish Gaelic: [əŋˈkʰaʃtʲəl̪ˠ]

Geography
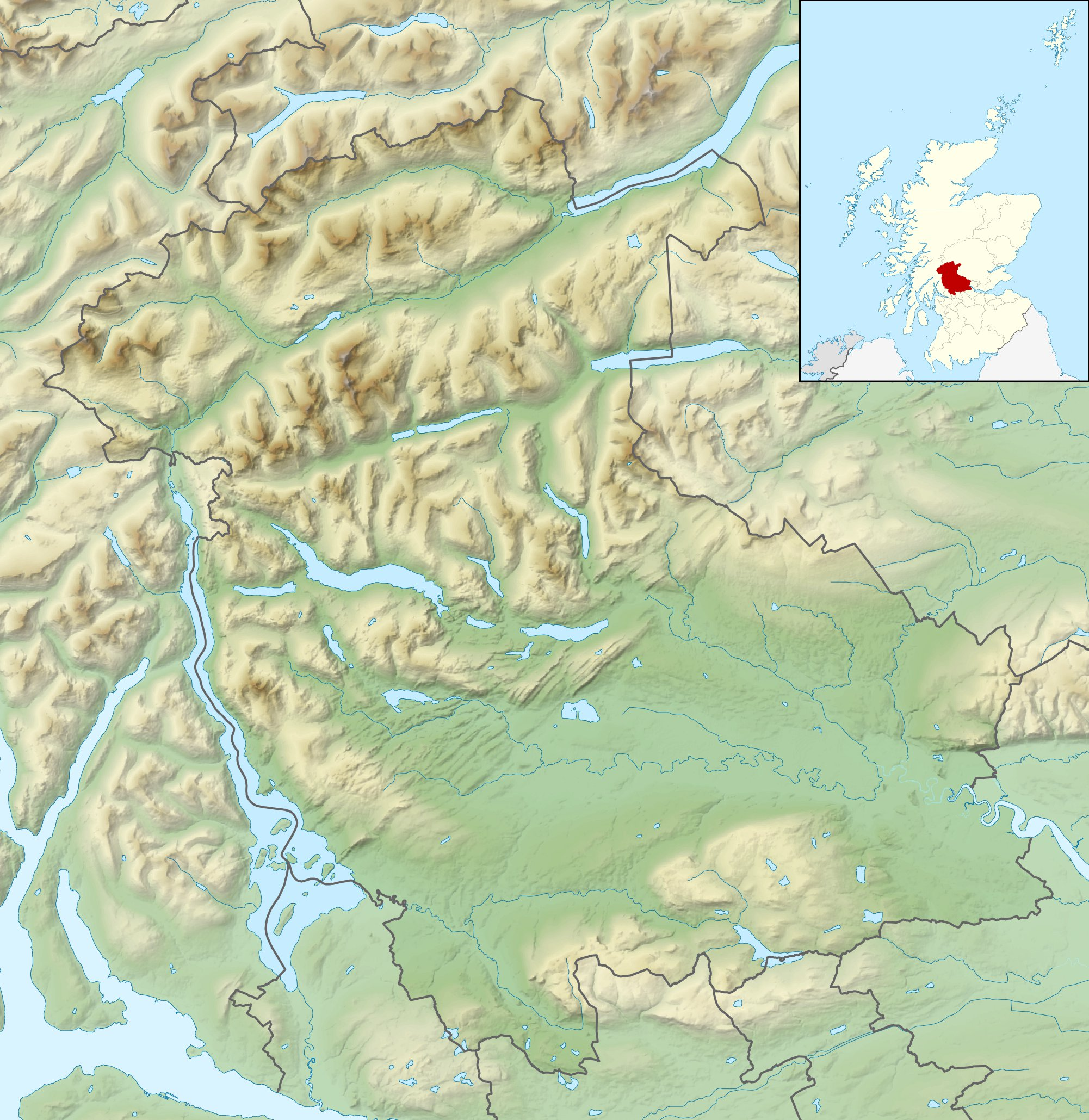
- Location within Stirling
- Location: Stirlingshire, Scotland
- Parent range: Grampians
- OS grid: NN378193
- Topo map: OS Landranger 50, 56 OS Explorer 364

Climbing
- Easiest route: North Ridge

An Caisteal (Scottish Gaelic for 'the castle') is a mountain in the Breadalbane region of the Scottish Highlands, south of the village of Crianlarich. It is a Munro with a height of 995 metres (3,264 ft).

== Overview ==
An Caisteal, which qualifies as a Munro, is located in a popular area for hill walking within a group of seven Munros and fourteen tops which stand on the eastern side of Glen Falloch in the Loch Lomond and the Trossachs National Park. The mountain reaches a height of 995 metres (3,264 feet) and is usually climbed together with the neighbouring Munro of Beinn a' Chroin, to which it is connected by a high col to the south east. The mountain's name translates from Gaelic as "the castle" and is believed to refer to the prominent castellated rocks at the summit which serve as an easy way of identifying it from a distance.

== Geography ==
An Caisteal is a mainly grassy hill with some rocky outcrops on its higher slopes. The mountain is formed by four ridges which radiate from its summit, the north ridge goes over a series of undulating rocky knolls known as Twistin Hill to reach the subsidiary top of Sròn Gharbh (709 metres) before dropping down to the A82 road in Glen Falloch. This northern ridge is the most popular route of ascent and Twistin Hill has some curious features on it as it approaches the summit, there are a number of small caves close to the path and a deep cleft cuts into the ridge. The north west ridge also terminates in Glen Falloch after crossing the lesser top of Stob Glas (710 metres), this ridge can be used for ascent but is not as popular as the route over Twistin Hill.

The other two ridges are shorter and link to other mountains with the south west ridge connecting to the Munro of Beinn Chabhair some two kilometres distant and includes a sharp rough descent and ascent over a low col with a height of 619 metres. The south east ridge links to Beinn a' Chroin across the Bealach Buidhe (805 metres) and the headwaters of the River Falloch. Drainage from the mountain reaches both the east and west coast of Scotland, most precipitation goes via the River Falloch and Loch Lomond to reach the Firth of Clyde at the west coast, however a small amount drains from the southern slopes to go via Strathyre and the River Teith to reach the Firth of Forth at the east coast.

== Ascents ==
An Caisteal is usually ascended from Glen Falloch — there is a large lay by for parking on the A82 at grid reference NN369239 although it is also possible to start from Derrydaroch farm 2.5 kilometres to the south west. The route goes under the railway by a cattle creep and follows a track by the River Falloch upstream for about a kilometre before striking SW to climb Sròn Gharbh direct across pathless grass. A path is then picked up at the summit of Sròn Gharbh which leads across Twistin Hill and past "The Castle" rocks to reach the summit.

== References and Footnotes ==
- The Munros, Scottish Mountaineering Trust, 1986, Donald Bennett (Editor) ISBN 0-907521-13-4
- The High Mountains of Britain and Ireland, Diadem, 1993, Irvine Butterfield, ISBN 0-906371-30-9
- 100 Best Routes on Scottish Mountains, Warner Books, 1992, Ralph Storer, ISBN 0-7515-0300-2
- Hamish’s Mountain Walk, Baton Wicks, 1996, Hamish Brown, ISBN 1-898573-08-5
- The Munros, Scotland Highest Mountains, Lomond Books 2006, Cameron McNeish, ISBN 1-84204-082-0

Footnotes
