= Stuchd an Lochain =

Mountain in Scotland

Coordinates: 56.57056°N 4.47067°W

- Stùc an Lochain
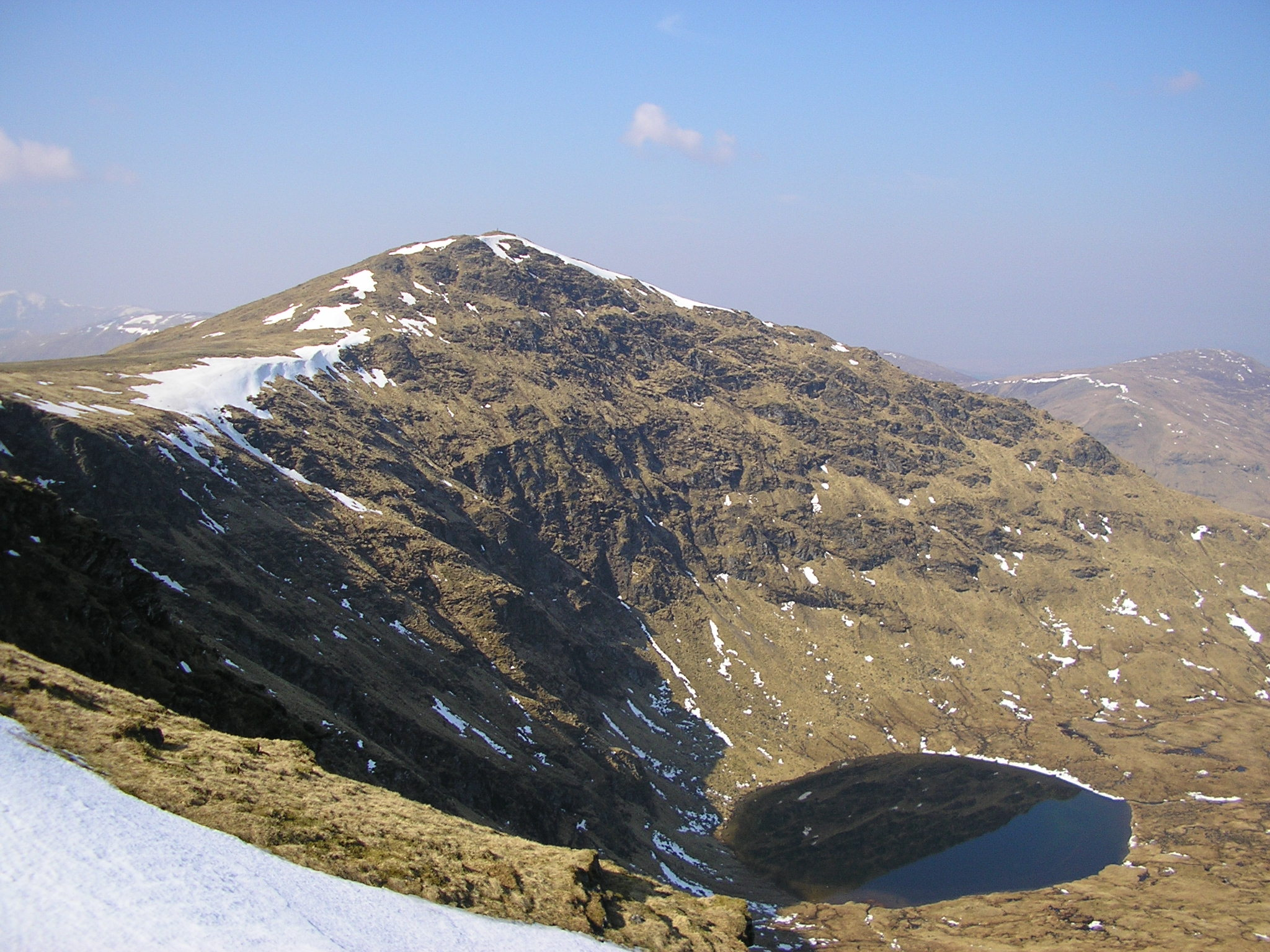
- Stuchd an Lochain with Loch na Cat

Highest point
- Elevation: 960 m (3,150 ft)
- Prominence: 482 m (1,581 ft)
- Parent peak: Schiehallion
- Listing: Munro, Marilyn

Naming
- English translation: peak of the little lake
- Language of name: Gaelic
- Pronunciation: Scottish Gaelic: [ˈs̪t̪uːxk ə ˈl̪ˠɔxɛɲ]

Geography
- Location: Stirling council area, Scotland
- Parent range: Grampian Mountains
- OS grid: NN483448
- Topo map: OS Landranger 51

Stuchd an Lochain (Scottish Gaelic: Stùc an Lochain, 'peak of the little lake') is a mountain in the Breadalbane region of the southern Scottish Highlands. It is a Munro, with a height of 960 metres (3,150 ft). It lies at the western end of Glen Lyon and forms the southern side of Loch an Daimh. The summit sits above a large corrie that contains a small lake called Lochan na Cat.

The primary route to the summit leaves from the eastern end of Loch an Daimh and climbs the ridge to the top of Sron Chona Choirein. From here the ridge turns roughly north for a short distance before turning north-west to the summit. Fit walkers can continue west for a circular walk around the loch taking in a Corbett, Sròn a' Choire Chnapanich, and another Munro, Meall Buidhe.
