= Beinn a' Chroin =

Mountain in the Stirling Council area, Scotland

Coordinates: 56°19′55″N 4°36′27″W

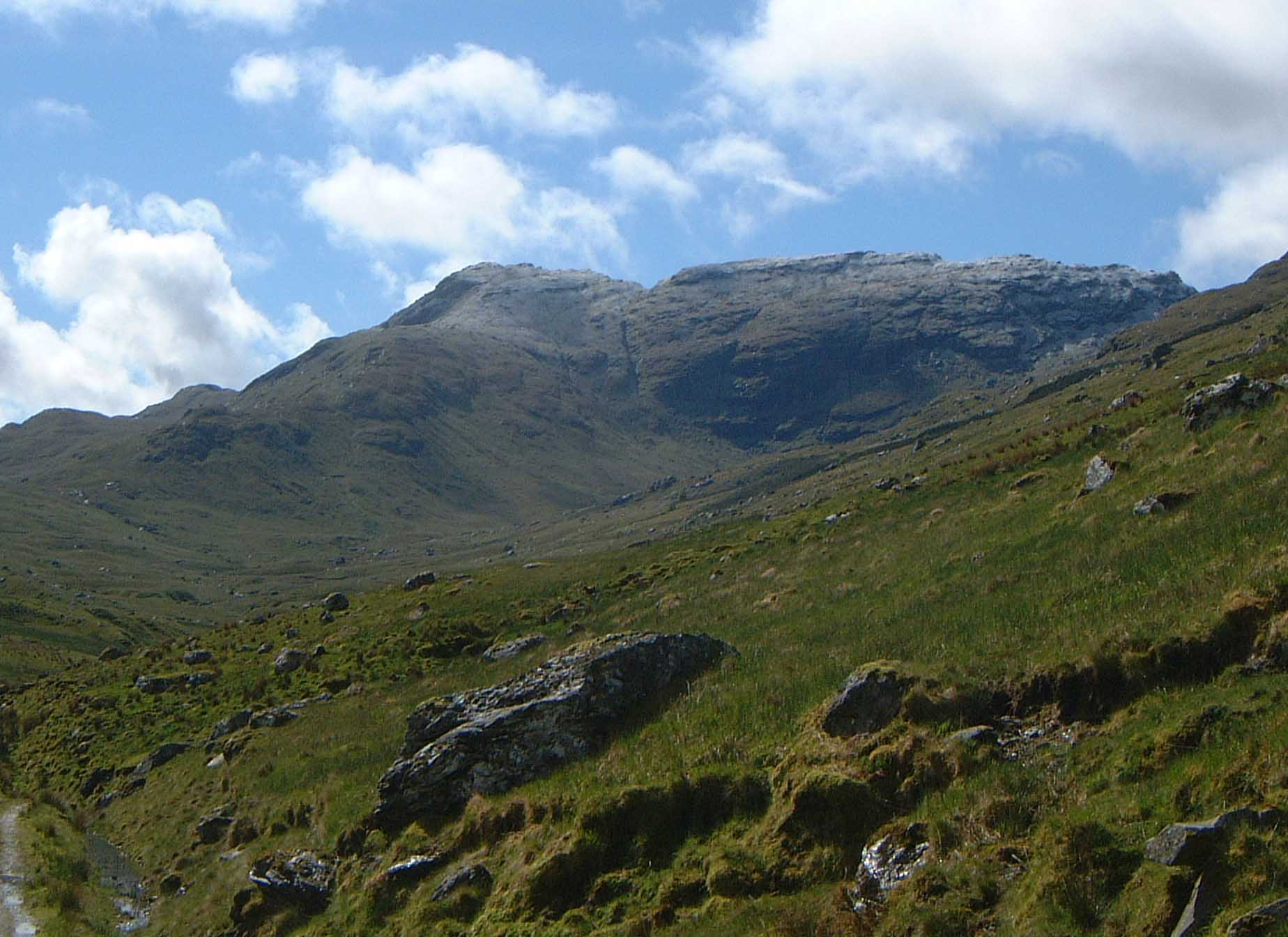
- Beinn a‘ Chroin seen from upper Glen Falloch.

Highest point
- Elevation: 941.4 m (3,089 ft)
- Prominence: 136.9 m (449 ft)
- Listing: Munro

Naming
- Language of name: Scottish Gaelic
- Pronunciation: Gaelic [ˈpeiɲ ə ˈxɾɔɲ]

Geography
- Location: Stirlingshire, Scotland
- Parent range: Grampians
- OS grid: NN387185
- Topo map: OS Landranger 50, 56 OS Explorer 364

Listed summits of Beinn a' Chroin
Name	Grid ref	Height	Status
East Top	NN394186	940.1 m (3,084 ft)	Munro Top
West Top	NN385185	938 m (3,077 ft)	Deleted Munro Top

Beinn a' Chroin is a mountain in the Breadalbane region of the Scottish Highlands, six kilometres south of Crianlarich. With a height of 941 metres (3,087 ft) it qualifies as a Munro.

== Overview ==
Beinn a’ Chroin stands well into the interior of the Crianlarich group of seven munros and so it is usually climbed with other hills in the area; more often than not it is ascended with An Caisteal which lies 1.5 kilometres northwest, across the Bealach Buidhe (805 metres). The hill is well seen from the upper part of Glen Falloch from where the long summit ridge and the steep head wall of Coire Earb can be appreciated. The translation of the mountains name from the Gaelic language is vague and there are three possible meanings.

Some sources give the translation as "hill of danger" although Beinn a’ Chroin is no more dangerous than any other peak in the group. Other sources give the meaning as "hill of the cloven hoof", referring to the mountain's twin summits.

== Geography ==
Beinn a’ Chroin is surrounded by four other Munros which lie round the head waters of the River Falloch, to the north and east lies Cruach Ardrain and Beinn Tulaichean which can be reached by an arduous journey contouring round Coire Earb and climbing the subsidiary top of Stob Glas. The other two Munros, An Caisteal and Beinn Chabhair can be attained by following the west ridge down to the Beallach Buidhe from here the continuation to An Caisteal is up steep slopes to the north west. To reach Beinn Chabhair there is further descending to the west to reach an unnamed col (609 metres) before ascending to the summit. The impressive Coire Earb stands on the north side of the mountain, this corrie gives fine examples of boulder fields and moraine as a result of glacial action from the last Ice age. The smaller Coire a’ Chroin lies on the upper southern slopes and contains the small Lochan a’ Chroin. Drainage from the mountain reaches both coasts of Scotland with the River Falloch going west from Coire Earb to the Firth of Clyde while all other rainfall goes east to the Firth of Forth.

== Ascents and summit ==
Most guide books recommend climbing Beinn a’ Chroin along with the adjacent Munro of An Caisteal. This walk starts from the A82 road at grid reference NN369239 and climbs An Caisteal first before continuing onto Beinn a’ Chroin by the Bealach Buidhe. A direct ascent is possible from the same starting point by walking high up into Coire Earb and then climbing the mountain by the north ridge which leads to the eastern end of the summit ridge. The mountain can also be climbed from the east starting at the end of the public road which leads to Inverlochlarig from the A84 at grid reference NN445184. This route follows the track by the River Larig to reach the foot of the mountain before climbing it by its steep grassy south east slopes. The summit ridge is undulating with several strange rock formations and some small sheets of water around the highest point.

== References and footnotes ==
- The Munros, Scottish Mountaineering Trust, 1986, Donald Bennett (Editor) ISBN 0-907521-13-4
- The High Mountains of Britain and Ireland, Diadem, 1993, Irvine Butterfield, ISBN 0-906371-30-9
- Hamish’s Mountain Walk, Baton Wicks, 1996, Hamish Brown, ISBN 1-898573-08-5
- The Munro - Scotlands Highest Mountains, 2006, Cameron McNeish, ISBN 1-84204-082-0
- 100 Best Routes on Scottish Mountains, Warner Books, 1992, Ralph Storer, ISBN 0-7515-0300-2

Footnotes
