= Strathyre railway station =

Former railway station in Scotland

Strathyre
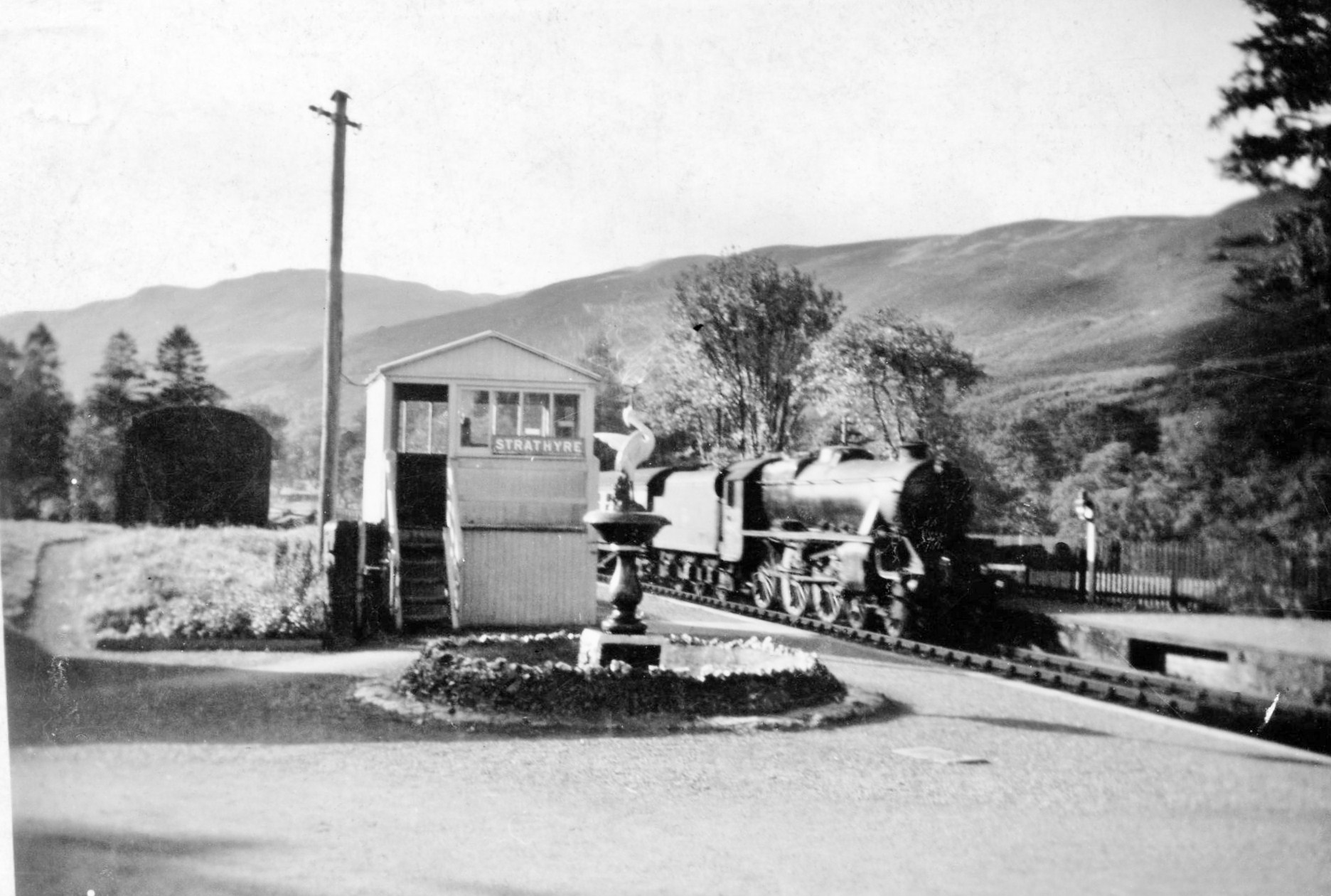
- Strathyre station and signal box in September 1956

General information
- Location: Strathyre, Stirling (district); Scotland
- Coordinates: 56.3236°N 4.3300°W
- Platforms: 2

Other information
- Status: Disused

History
- Original company: Callander and Oban Railway
- Pre-grouping: Callander and Oban Railway operated by Caledonian Railway

Key dates
- 1 June 1870: Opened
- 28 September 1965: Effective closure date
- 1 November 1965: Official closure date
Location

Strathyre was a railway station located at the head of Loch Lubnaig, Stirling, in Strathyre.

== History ==
This station opened on 1 June 1870 along with the first section of the Callander and Oban Railway, between Callander and Glenoglehead (originally named 'Killin').

The station was laid out with two platforms, one on either side of a crossing loop. There were sidings on the east side of the station.

Final closure came on 27 September 1965 following a landslide in Glen Ogle.

== Signalling ==
Strathyre signal box, which replaced the original box on 13 May 1890, was located on the Up platform, on the east side of the railway. It had 12 levers.

Preceding station	Historical railways	Following station
Callander	Callander and Oban Railway	Kingshouse
