= Breadalbane =

Breadalbane may refer to:

== Australia ==
- Breadalbane, New South Wales, a village
- Breadalbane, Queensland, a locality in the Whitsunday Region
- Breadalbane, Tasmania, a town

== Canada ==
- Breadalbane, a community within the rural community of Miramichi River Valley
- Breadalbane, Prince Edward Island, a community in Canada

== United Kingdom ==
- Breadalbane, Scotland, an area of the Scottish Highlands
- Breadalbane (ship), a British merchant ship
- The Earl of Breadalbane and Holland
- The Marquess of Breadalbane
- Breadalbane Hydro-Electric Scheme
