= Broadalbin (village), New York =

Broadalbin, New York
- Village
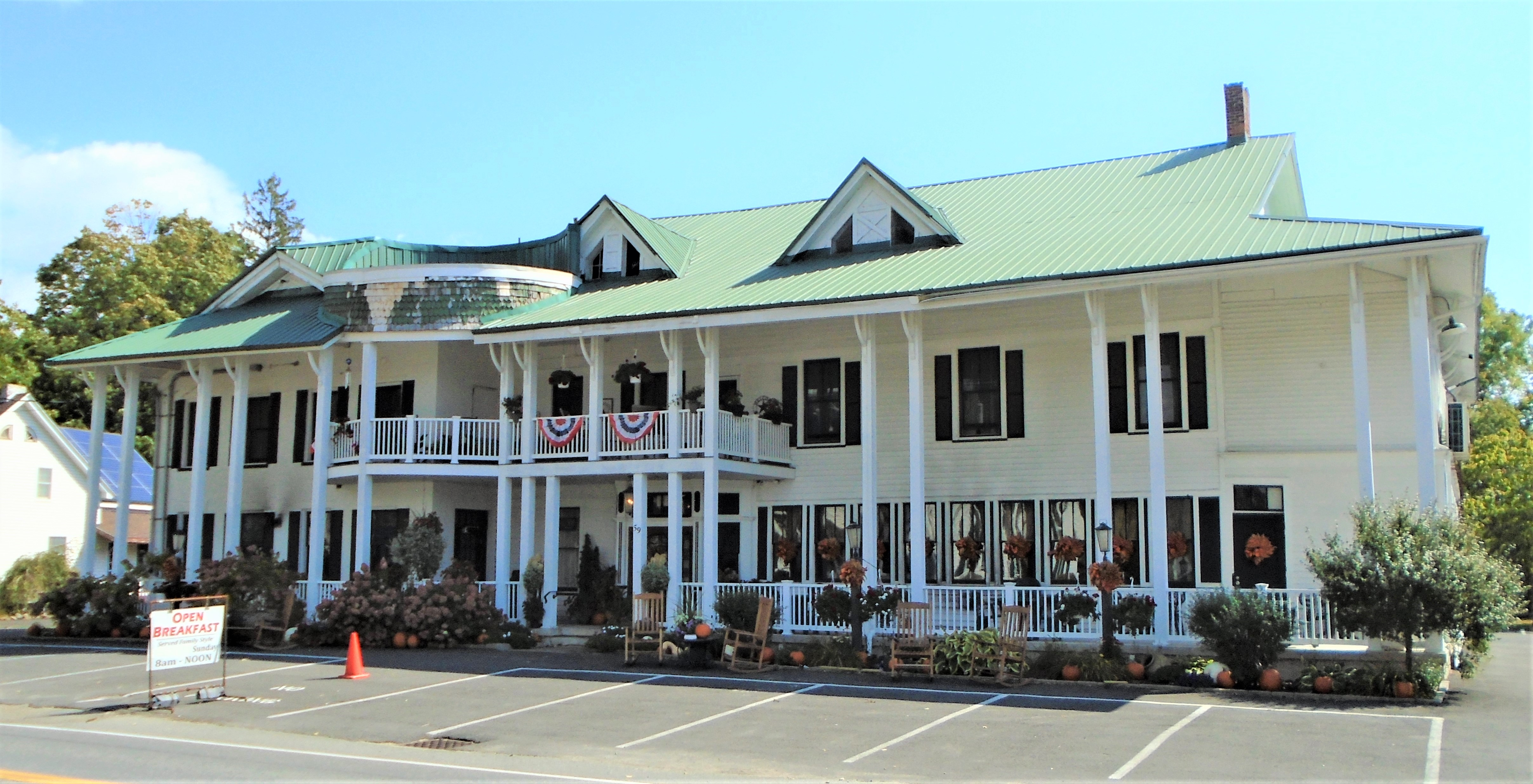
- Hotel Broadalbin (2020)

- Location within New York Location within the United States
- Coordinates: 43°3′33″N 74°11′53″W
- Country: United States
- State: New York
- County: Fulton
- Towns: Broadalbin, Mayfield

Area
  - Total: 1.36 sq mi (3.51 km^{2})
  - Land: 1.35 sq mi (3.50 km^{2})
  - Water: 0.0039 sq mi (0.01 km^{2})
- Elevation: 804 ft (245 m)

Population (2020)
  - Total: 1,384
  - Density: 1,024.0/sq mi (395.35/km^{2})
- Time zone: UTC-5 (Eastern (EST))
  - Summer (DST): UTC-4 (EDT)
- ZIP code: 12025
- Area code: 518
- FIPS code: 36-08422
- GNIS feature ID: 0944788

Broadalbin is a village in Fulton County, New York, United States. The name derives from the Breadalbane Region in Scotland. The majority of the village lies in the town of Broadalbin, but a small part is located in the town of Mayfield.

The population of the village was 1,327 at the 2010 census.

== History ==
The village is near the site of the first settlement in the town, which took place c.1770.

The Hotel Broadalbin, built in 1854 as a glove store and expanded in 1881 when it was converted into a hotel, was listed on the National Register of Historic Places in 2011. It was recently renovated and continues to operate year-round as a hotel.

In 1879, the east side of North Main Street was devastated by fire. Although 16 businesses were destroyed, there was no loss of life.

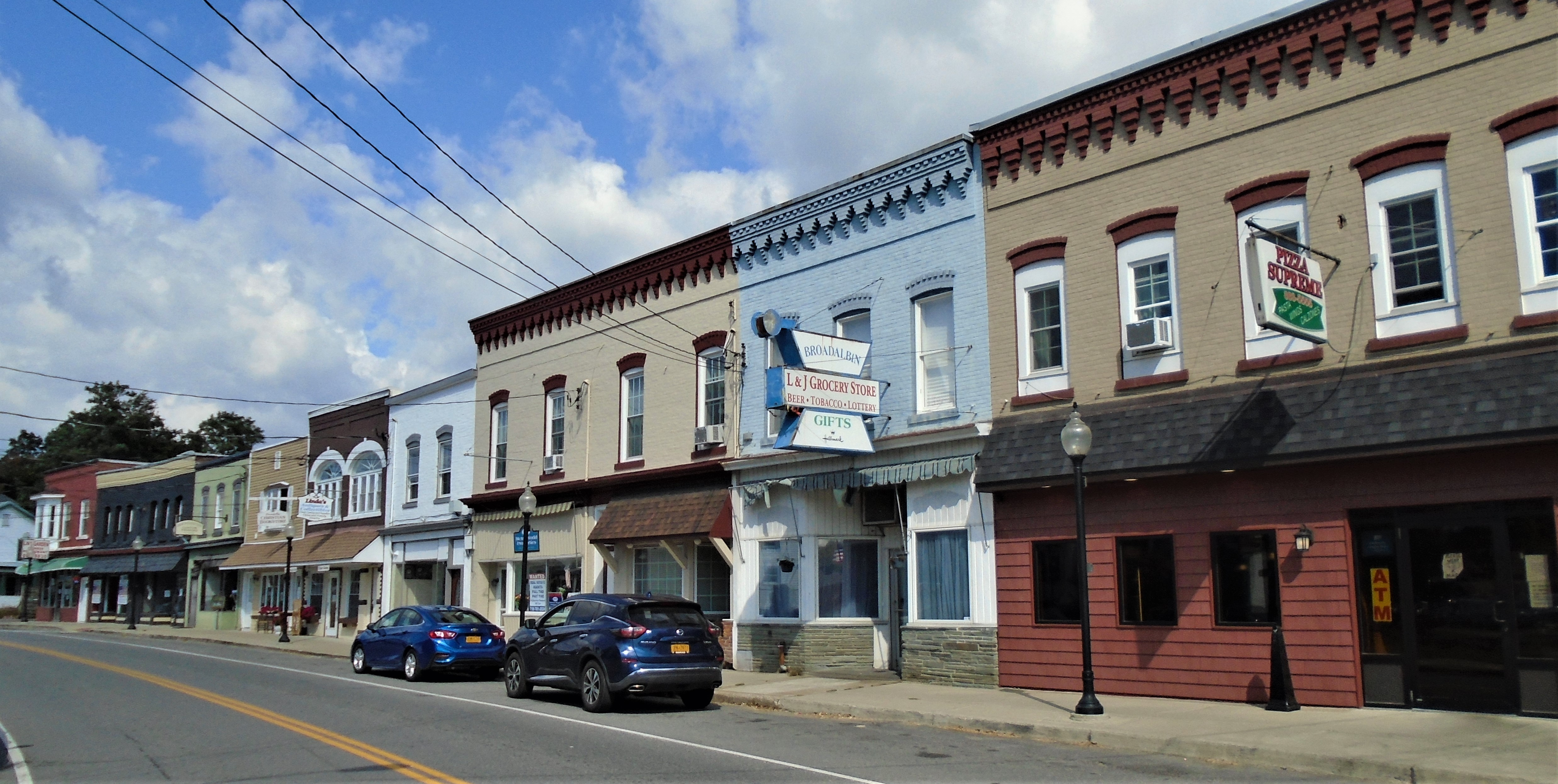
This side of North Main Street was devastated by fire in 1879.

== Geography ==
Broadalbin is located in southeastern Fulton County at 43°3′33″N 74°11′53″W (43.05917, -74.198057). Most of the village is in the western part of the town of Broadalbin, but a portion of the village extends west into the town of Mayfield.

According to the United States Census Bureau, the village has a total area of 1.13 square miles (2.92 km^{2}), of which 0.004 square miles (0.01 km^{2}), or 0.36%, is covered with water.

New York State Route 29 passes through the south part of the village, leading east 22 miles (35 km) to Saratoga Springs and west 10 miles (16 km) to Johnstown, the Fulton County seat. County Roads 110, 117, 126, and 155 serve the village.

Kennyetto Creek flows through the village, running west, then north, to Great Sacandaga Lake. The village is at the south edge of the Adirondack Park.

== Demographics ==
Historical population
Census	Pop.	Note	%±
1890	708		—
1930	1,341		—
1940	1,399		4.3%
1950	1,400		0.1%
1960	1,438		2.7%
1970	1,452		1.0%
1980	1,415		−2.5%
1990	1,397		−1.3%
2000	1,411		1.0%
2010	1,327		−6.0%
2020	1,384		4.3%
U.S. Decennial Census

As of the census of 2000, there were 1,411 people, 555 households, and 380 families residing in the village. The population density was 1,392.8 inhabitants per square mile (537.8/km^{2}). There were 596 housing units at an average density of 588.3 per square mile (227.1/km^{2}). The racial makeup of the village was 98.65% White, 0.35% Black or African American, 0.35% Native American, 0.07% Asian, 0.07% Pacific Islander, 0.07% from other races, and 0.43% from two or more races. Hispanic or Latino of any race were 0.35% of the population.

There were 555 households, out of which 35.3% had children under the age of 18 living with them, 53.7% were married couples living together, 11.7% had a female householder with no husband present, and 31.5% were non-families. 25.8% of all households were made up of individuals, and 13.0% had someone living alone who was 65 years of age or older. The average household size was 2.54 and the average family size was 3.08.

In the village, the population was spread out, with 28.2% under the age of 18, 7.1% from 18 to 24, 27.1% from 25 to 44, 21.9% from 45 to 64, and 15.7% who were 65 years of age or older. The median age was 37 years. For every 100 females, there were 91.5 males. For every 100 females age 18 and over, there were 85.2 males.

The median income for a household in the village was $35,664, and the median income for a family was $40,956. Males had a median income of $31,618 versus $24,211 for females. The per capita income for the village was $18,036. About 3.2% of families and 5.3% of the population were below the poverty line, including 4.4% of those under age 18 and 5.3% of those age 65 or over.

== See also ==
- Broadalbin (town), New York
