= Meall Buidhe, Glen Lyon =

Coordinates: 56.61681°N 4.44925°W

Meall Buidhe
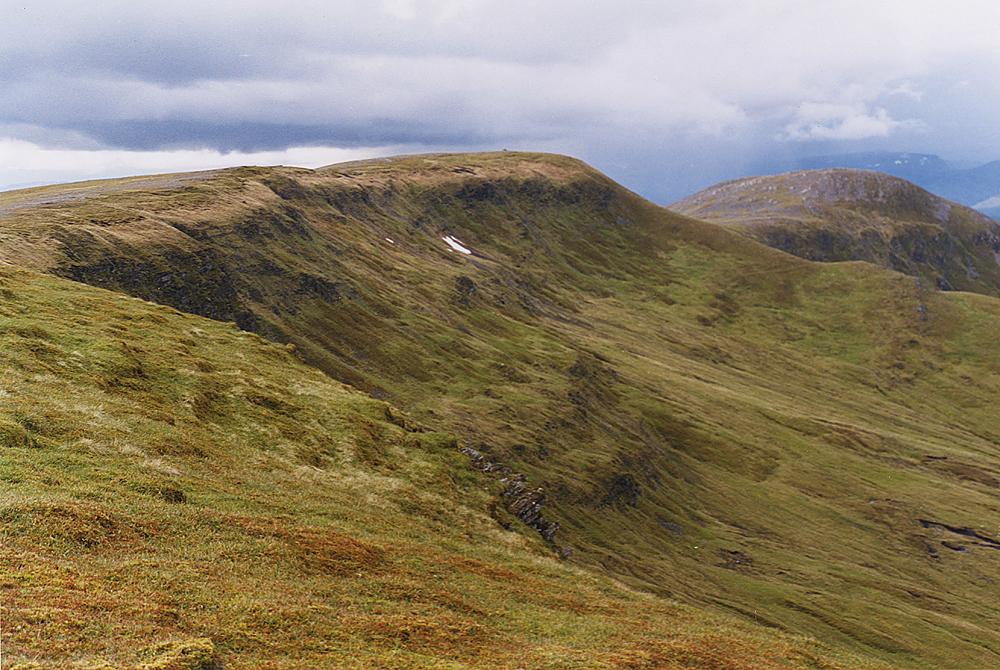
- Meall Buidhe summit

Highest point
- Elevation: 932 m (3,058 ft)
- Prominence: c. 236 m
- Parent peak: Stuchd an Lochain
- Listing: Munro, Marilyn

Naming
- English translation: Yellow hill
- Language of name: Gaelic
- Pronunciation: Scottish Gaelic: [ˈmjaul̪ˠ ˈpujə]

Geography
- Location: Stirling council area, Scotland
- OS grid: NN498499
- Topo map: OS Landranger 51

Meall Buidhe is a Munro situated in the southern highlands of Scotland. It forms the northern side of Loch an Daimh and is often climbed in conjunction with Stuchd an Lochain. The normal route climbs north from the eastern end of the loch until easier ground is reached. The route angles east and then north once the ridge is gained. Strong walkers can continue round the loch and take in a Corbett, Sron a' Choire Chnapanich, and the aforementioned Stuchd an Lochain.
