= Hotel Broadalbin =

Historic hotel in Broadalbin, New York, US

- U.S. National Register of Historic Places
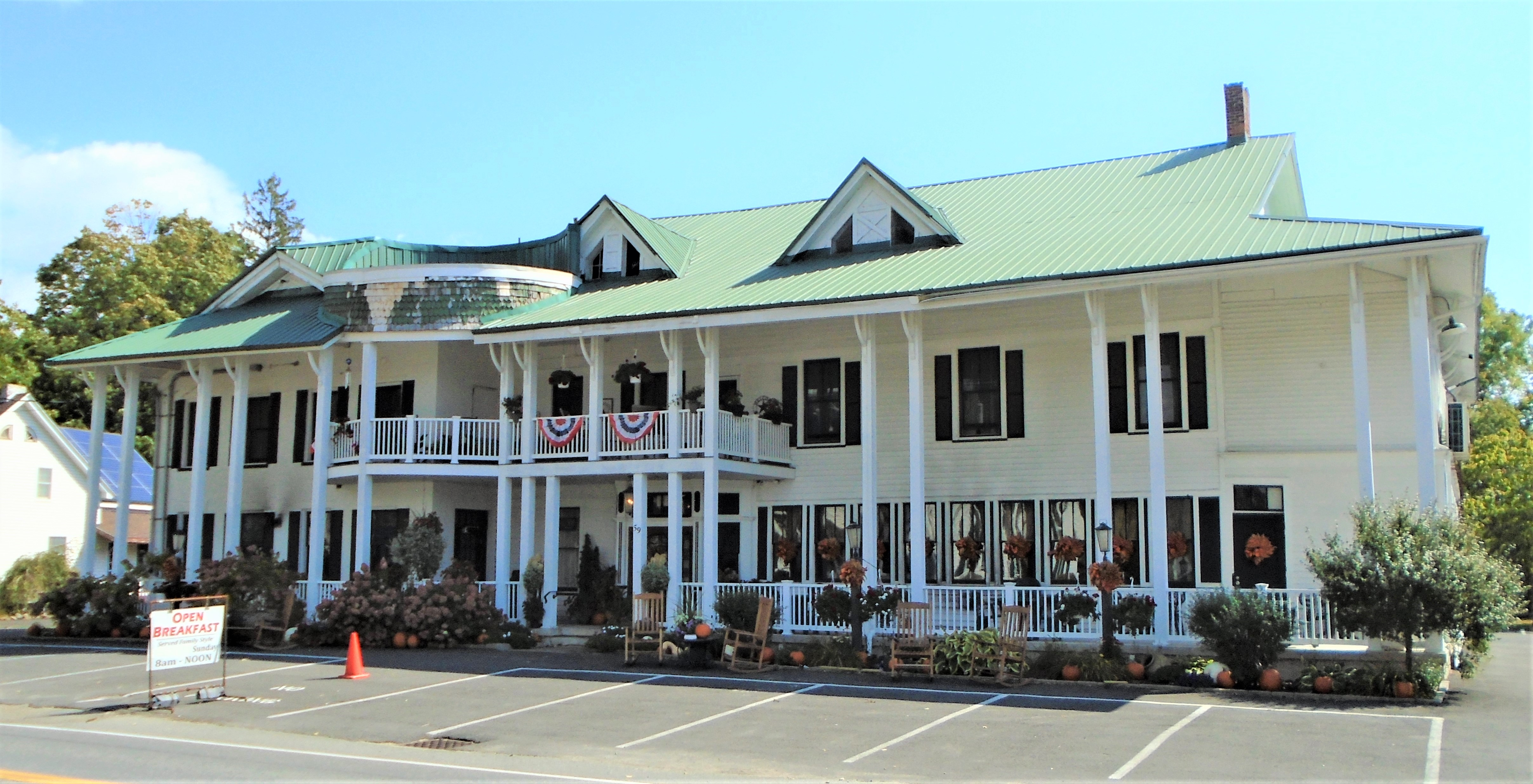
- (2020)

- Location within New York Location within the United States
- Location: 59 W. Main St., Broadalbin, New York
- Coordinates: 43°3′24″N 74°11′57″W
- Area: 2.1 acres (0.85 ha)
- Built: 1854, 1881
- NRHP reference No.: 11000252
- Added to NRHP: May 4, 2011

Hotel Broadalbin is a historic hotel at 59 W. Main St. in Broadalbin, Fulton County, New York. The property was recently renovated and reopened in July 2019 as a full-service hotel. It features a restaurant, bar and lounge, and operates year round.

The historic structure is a two-part building consisting of a two-story, brick block building built in 1854, when it was built as a glove store, and clapboard clad frame block added in 1881 when it was converted into a hotel. The brick block measures 30 feet by 90 and frame addition is 55 feet by 65 feet. Both have gable roofs and features a two-story, hipped roof verandah added about 1881.

It was listed on the National Register of Historic Places in 2011.
