= Ben More (Crianlarich) =

Mountain in Scotland

Coordinates: 56.386381°N 4.539267°W

- Beinn Mhòr
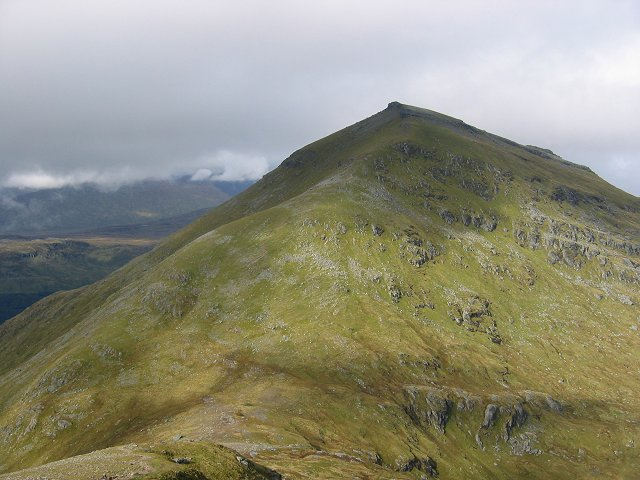
- Ben More from Stob Binnein, showing the conical shape of the hill and the tilted rockbands of the mica schist

Highest point
- Elevation: 1,174 m (3,852 ft)
- Prominence: c. 986 metres (3,235 ft); Ranked 6th in British Isles
- Parent peak: Ben Nevis
- Listing: Munro, Marilyn, Council top (Stirling)

Naming
- English translation: big mountain
- Language of name: Gaelic
- Pronunciation: Gaelic [ə ˈveiɲ ˈvoːɾ]

Geography
- Ben More in the Stirling council area Ben More in Scotland
- Location: Stirlingshire, Scotland
- Parent range: Grampian Mountains
- OS grid: NN432244
- Topo map: OS Landranger 51, Explorer 365

Ben More (Scottish Gaelic: Beinn Mhòr, "the great mountain") is a mountain in the Breadalbane region of the southern Scottish Highlands, near Crianlarich. Rising to 1,174 metres (3,852 ft), it is a Munro and is the highest of the so-called Crianlarich Hills to the south-east of the village. It is separated from Stob Binnein (1,165 m or 3,822 ft) by the Bealach-eadar-dà-Bheinn, "col between two mountains". It is the highest peak in the Loch Lomond and The Trossachs National Park.

Ben More's north side contains a long-lasting snow patch, which – uniquely in the Southern Highlands – is named on a 1:25000 Ordnance Survey map, and is called the Cuidhe Chrom (crooked wreath), on account of the shape it forms in late spring/early summer. This patch frequently lasts until well into June and sometimes July. The similar name Cuidhe Cròm appears as a summit near Lochnagar.

== Climbing ==
The simplest ascent starts from Benmore Farm on the A85. Initially, one should follow the path leading up Benmore Burn, before leaving this path and heading up the northwest ridge of Ben More. The ridge is unrelentingly steep, rising 1,000 m (3,300 ft) in about four kilometres (2 1/2 mi). The northeast ridge may prove a preferable alternative, being craggier and less steep. To reach this the walker should follow the burn of Allt Coire Chaorach, before striking for the ridge of Sròn nam Fòirsairean once clear of the forestry that cloaks the lower slopes of this side of Ben More. This route is around five kilometres (3 mi) long.

Ben More is often climbed in conjunction with its twin peak neighbour Stob Binnein by descending to the Bealach-eadar-dà-Bheinn and then on to the second peak. Descent may be made from the col direct to Benmore Burn.

In the event of an incident, Killin Mountain Rescue Team are on duty.

A webcam located at the eastern edge of Crianlarich captures Ben More. It provides updates every 10 minutes. See https://www.benmorewebcam.co.uk

== Air crashes ==
On 19 January 1973, a Vickers Viscount of British European Airways took off from Glasgow International Airport at about 14:20 on a test flight to be conducted at Flight Level (FL) 40; in the conditions prevailing at the time FL40 was equivalent to about 3,850 feet (1,173 m). At about 14:32 the aircraft flew into Ben More about 600 ft (180 m) northeast and 100 ft (30 m) below the summit while flying in a westerly direction. The two pilots and two passengers on board were killed in the accident. The Air Accidents Investigation Branch (AAIB) found that the aircraft struck Ben More whilst flying over snow-covered high terrain in marginal visual meteorological conditions and said that "Failure to maintain a safe altitude and insufficient attention to navigational procedures were contributory factors".

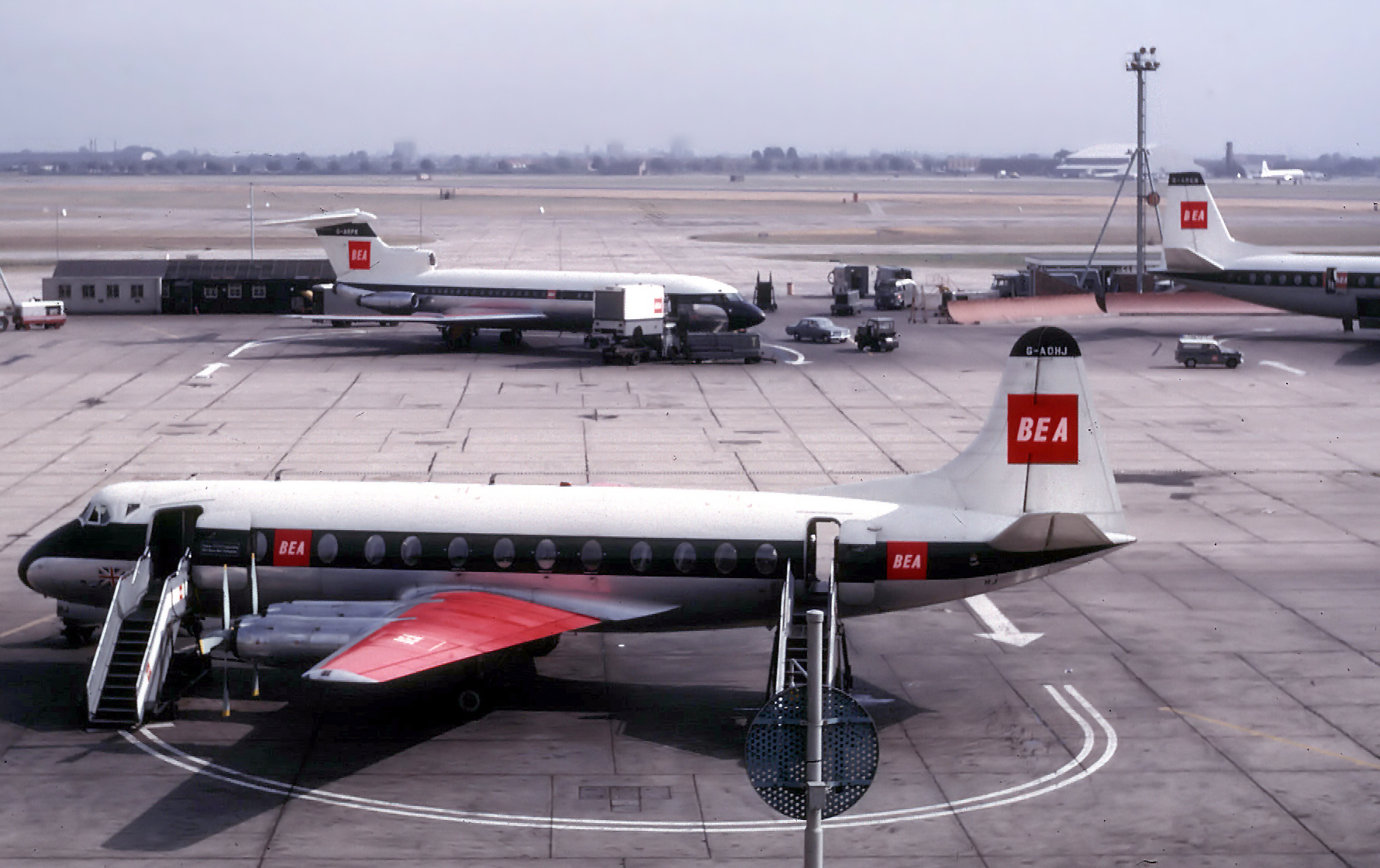
A BEA Vickers Viscount

On 12 May 2012, two men were killed when their microlight aircraft crashed into the mountain at about 12:00 midday.

== See also ==
- List of Munro mountains
- Mountains and hills of Scotland
