= Stob Binnein =

1165m high mountain in Stirling, Scotland

Coordinates: 56.37153°N 4.53551°W

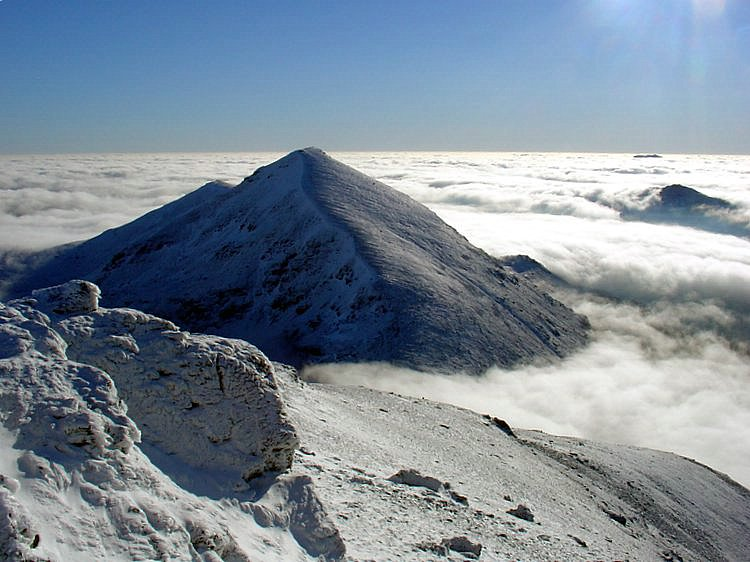
- Stob Binnein from Ben More in a winter temperature inversion

Highest point
- Elevation: 1,165 m (3,822 ft)
- Prominence: 303 m (994 ft)
- Parent peak: Ben More
- Listing: Munro, Marilyn

Naming
- English translation: Conical peak
- Language of name: Gaelic
- Pronunciation: Scottish Gaelic: [ˈs̪t̪op ˈpiɲɛɲ]

Geography
- Location: Stirling council area, Scotland
- OS grid: NN435228
- Topo map(s): OS Landranger 51 and Explorer 365

Stob Binnein is a mountain in the southern Highlands of Scotland, near Crianlarich. It forms a twin-peak with Ben More 1,174 metres (3,852 ft), from which it is separated by the Bealach-eadar-dà-Bheinn, meaning pass between two hills.

Stob Binnein is often climbed in conjunction with Ben More by means of the Bealach-eadar-dà-Bheinn. Descent may be made from the bealach direct to Benmore Burn. It may also be climbed from the south, starting near Inverlochlarig, some eight kilometres (five miles) from Balquhidder. A route of about five kilometres (three miles) climbs from the glen, following the mountain's southern ridge over the intervening minor summits of Stob Invercarnaig and Stob Coire an Lochain.

== See also ==
- Ben Nevis
- List of Munro mountains
- Mountains and hills of Scotland
