= River Balvaig =

Scottish river in the Forth Basin

Coordinates: 56.3387°N 4.3298°W

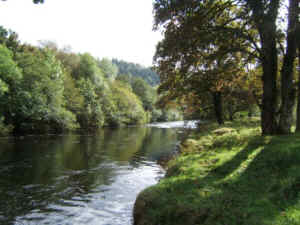
River Balvaig

The River Balvaig (Scottish Gaelic: Abhainn Balbhaig) is a short river, approximately 8 km (5.0 mi) long, draining from the head of Loch Voil near Balquhidder in Scotland and then passing southwards through the village of Strathyre before flowing into the northern end of Loch Lubnaig.

The river is known for its wildlife and opportunities for anglers fishing for brown trout and spring salmon.
