= Loch Doine =

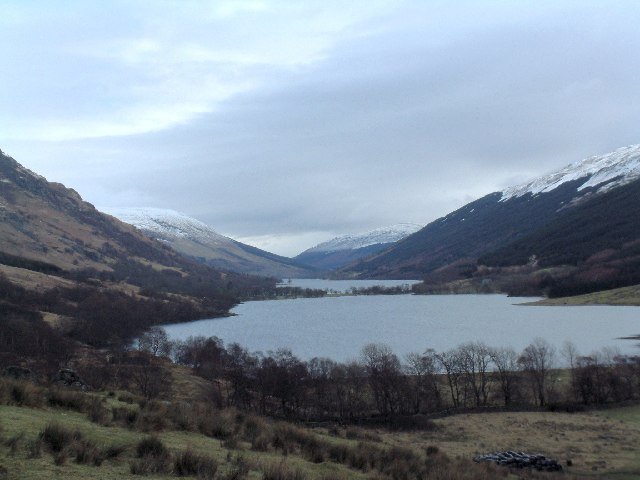
- Loch Doine. Looking east across Loch Doine with Loch Voil in the background.

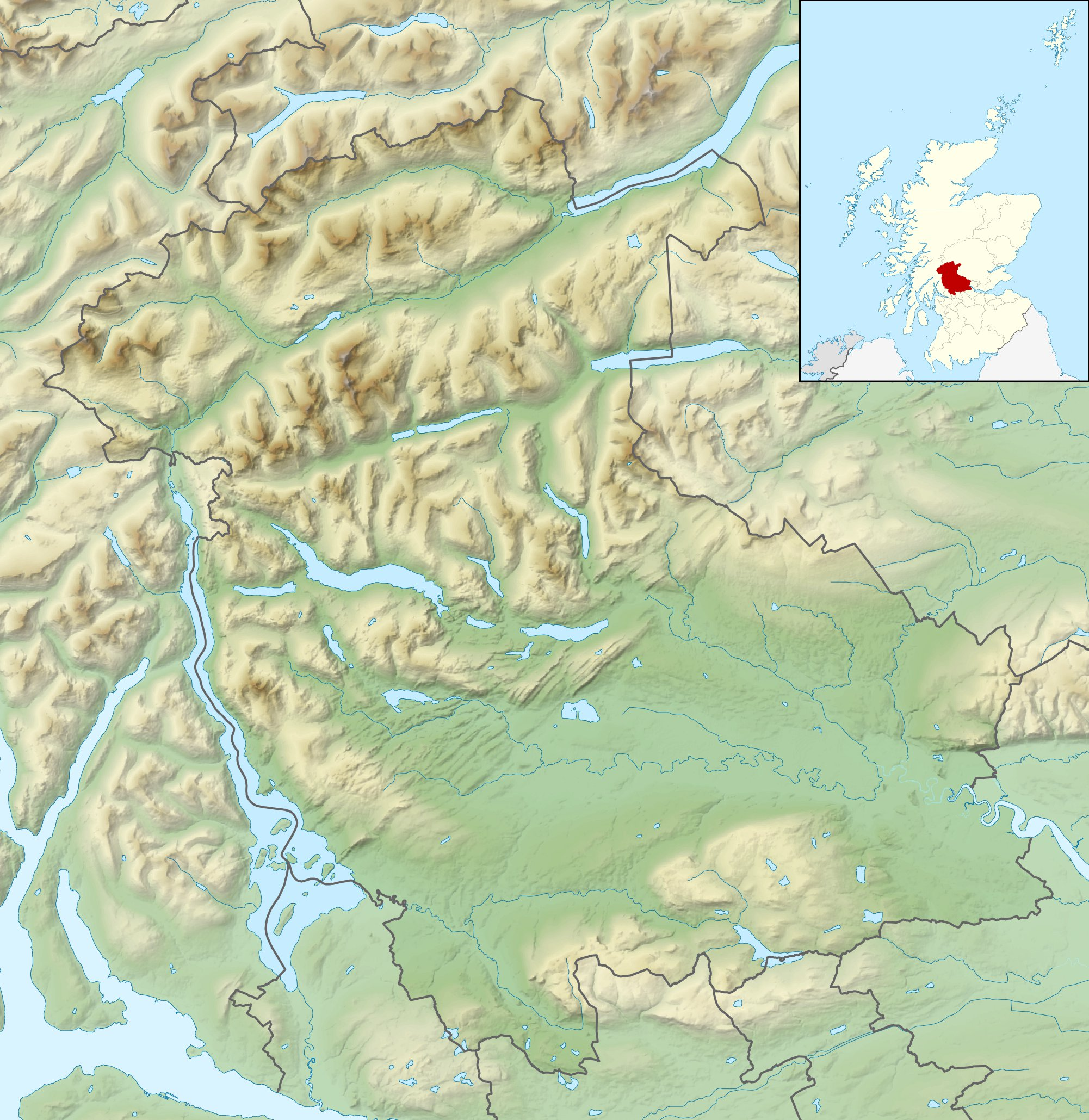
- Location within Stirling
- Location: Perthshire, Scotland
- Coordinates: 56.340°N 4.478°W
- Type: freshwater loch
- Primary inflows: River Larig
- River sources: River Balvaig
- Max. length: 1.6 km (0.99 mi)
- Max. width: 0.4 km (0.25 mi)
- Surface area: 50 ha (120 acres)
- Average depth: 10.1 m (33 ft)
- Max. depth: 19.8 m (65 ft)
- Shore length^{1}: 4.1 km (2.5 mi)
- Surface elevation: 128 m (420 ft)
- Islands: 1
- ^{1} Shore length is not a well-defined measure.

Loch Doine is a small freshwater loch that lies to the west of Balquhidder in the Trossachs and Teith ward within Stirling council area of Scotland. It is a short, narrow loch. It is separated from Loch Voil to the east by a small channel. The Loch can be reached by a small single track road from Balquhidder leading to Inverlochlarig.
