= Loch Voil =

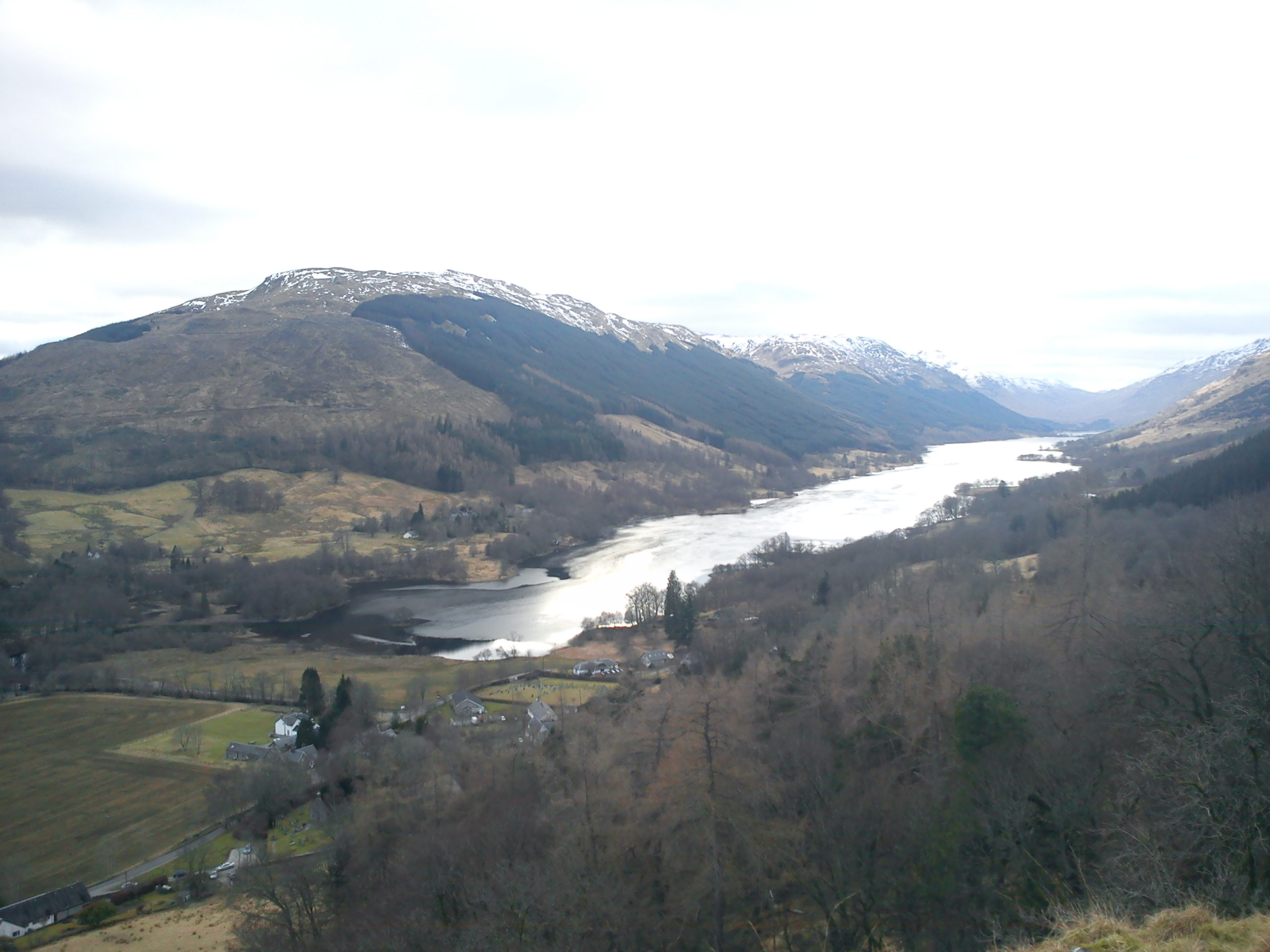
- View from Creag An Tuirc

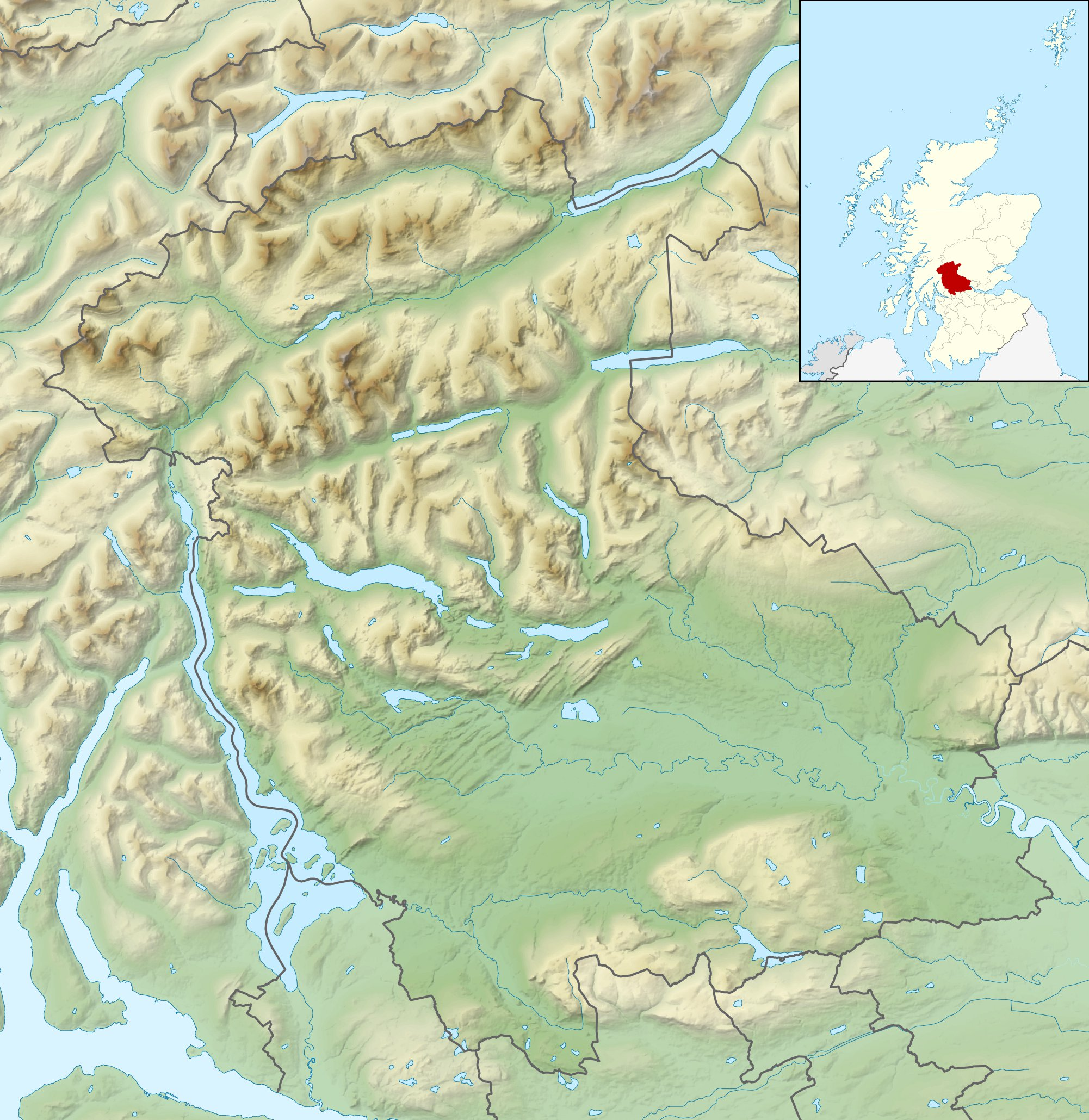
- Location within Stirling
- Location: Perthshire, Scotland
- Coordinates: 56.348000°N 4.422°W
- Type: freshwater loch
- Primary inflows: River Larig
- River sources: River Balvaig
- Max. length: 5.6 km (3.5 mi)
- Max. width: 0.4 km (0.25 mi)
- Surface area: 216.6 ha (535 acres)
- Average depth: 39.5 ft (12.0 m)
- Max. depth: 98 ft (30 m)
- Shore length^{1}: 13.5 km (8.4 mi)
- Surface elevation: 127 m (417 ft)
- Islands: 1
- ^{1} Shore length is not a well-defined measure.

Loch Voil (Scottish Gaelic: Loch a' Bheothail) is a small freshwater loch that lies to the west of Balquhidder in the Stirling council area of Scotland. It is a short, narrow loch. It is separated from Loch Doine by fluvial deposits from the Monachyle Burn and is drained at its eastern end by the River Balvag at Balquhidder. The Loch can be reached by a small single track road from Balquhidder leading to Inverlochlarig.
