= Loch Lubnaig =

Loch in Stirling, Scotland

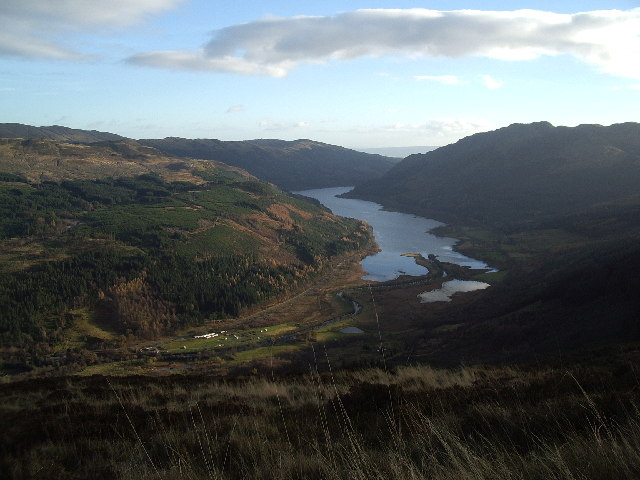

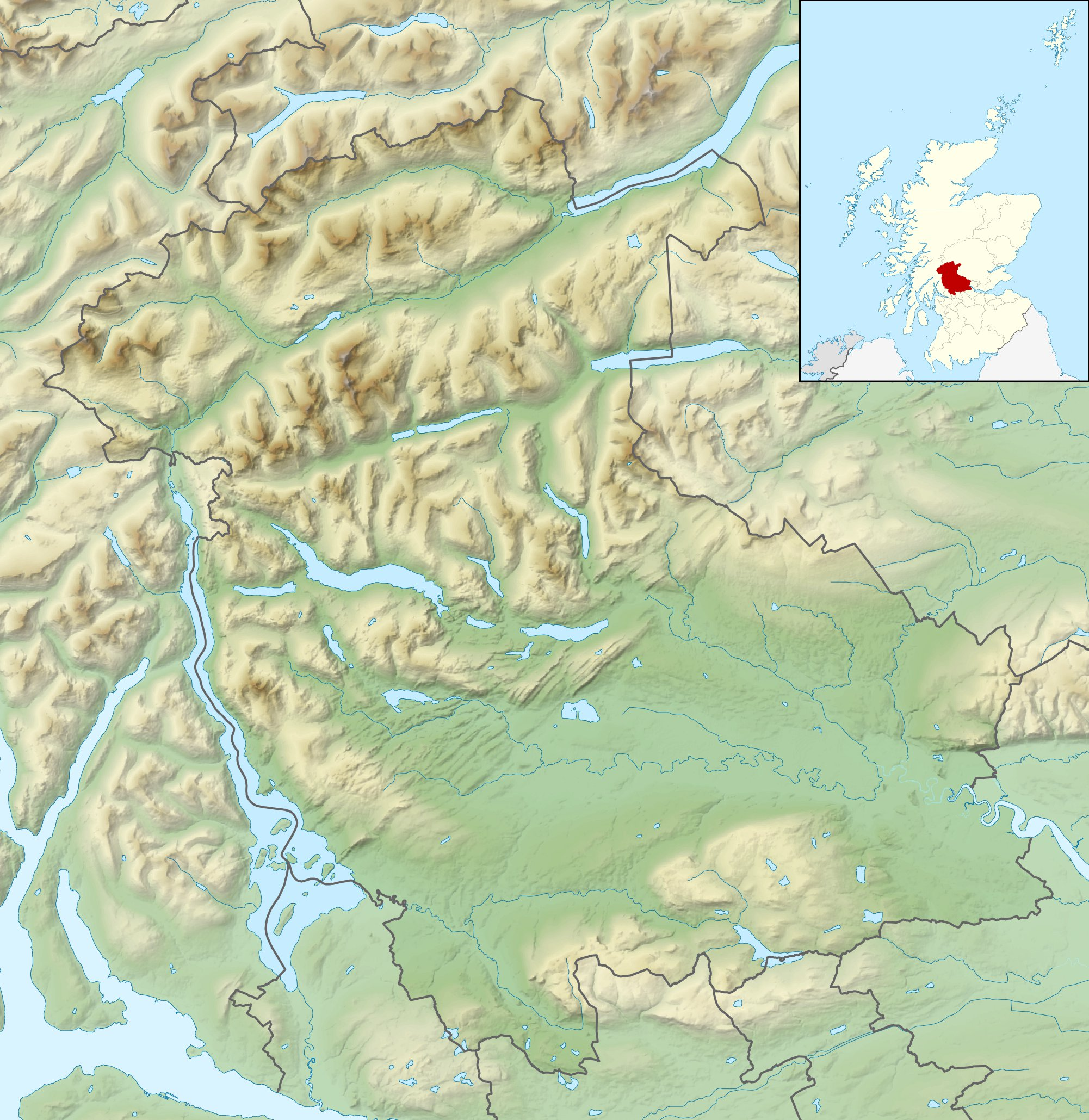
- Location within Stirling
- Location: Perthshire, Scotland
- Coordinates: 56.2913°N 4.2918°W
- Type: freshwater loch
- Primary inflows: River Balvaig
- Primary outflows: Garbh Uisge
- Max. length: 6.437 km (4.000 mi)
- Max. width: 0.38 km (0.24 mi)
- Surface area: 232.4 ha (574 acres)
- Average depth: 20.5 ft (6.2 m)
- Max. depth: 146 ft (45 m)
- Shore length^{1}: 14.6 km (9.1 mi)
- Surface elevation: 121 m (397 ft)
- ^{1} Shore length is not a well-defined measure.

Loch Lubnaig (Scottish Gaelic: Loch Lùbnaig) is a small freshwater loch near Callander in the Stirling council area, Scottish Highlands. It lies in the former county of Perthshire. It is part of the Loch Lomond and The Trossachs National Park.

The loch nestles in the space between Ben Ledi and Ben Vorlich. Fed by the River Balvaig from the north and drained by the Garbh Uisge to the south, Loch Lubnaig offers fishing from the shore while canoes can be rented at the north end. Alternatively, two car parking areas on the east shore offer canoe launching points.

The route of the former Callander and Oban Railway runs along the west shore of the loch. This route has now been converted to a part of the National Cycle Network's "Route 7" allowing cyclists and walkers to travel the nine miles (14 kilometres) between Callander and Strathyre.

The name is derived from the Gaelic Lùbnaig, meaning crooked. Like many lochs of the Highlands, the name is almost identical to its Gaelic version.

== Bathymetrical survey ==
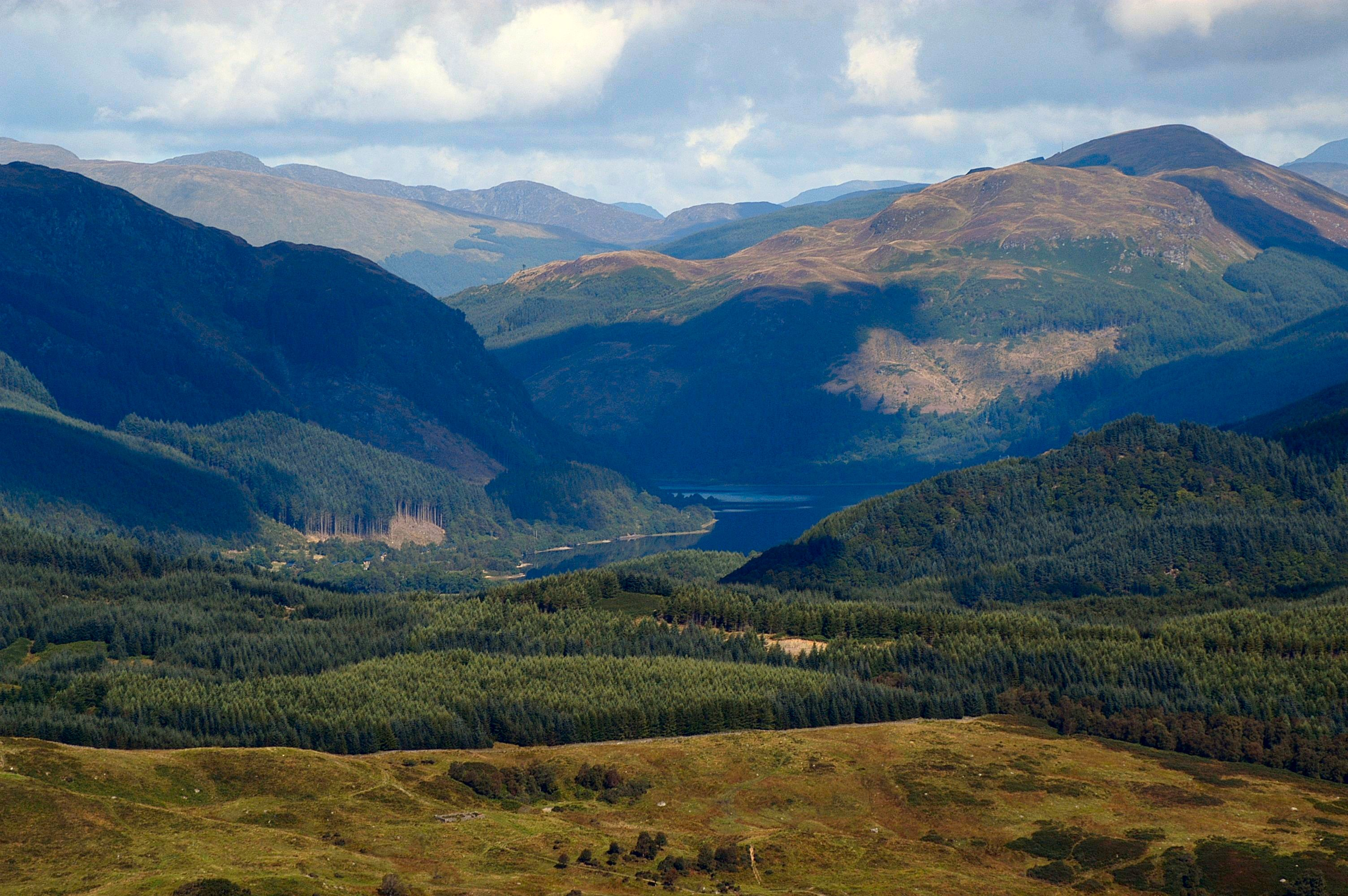
Loch Lubnaig from the Radio Mast

Loch Lubnaig is different from the other lochs in its neighbourhood in that it does not constitute a single basin. The bottom is irregular, the contour lines of depth do not follow the contour of the loch. Hollows and ridges alternate with each other and in some places, deep water is found close to the shore, while in other places shallow water extends a considerable distance from the shore. The loch is narrow and shallow considering its size, comparatively speaking, nearly two-thirds of the area being under 50 feet (15 m) in depth. The loch may be considered into two halves, defined by the central constriction in the outline of the loch at the entrance of the Ardchillarie burn, where the bottom shallows and separates two principal deep depressions. The northern half trends in a north-west and south-east direction, while the southern half trends almost directly north and south.

There are two depressions in which the depth exceeds 100 feet (30 m), with an isolated sounding of 106 feet (32 m) between them. The larger depression is contained in the southern half of the loch, and is over 1/2 mile (800 m) in length with a maximum width of about 280 yards (260 m). The smaller but deeper depression is situated at the base of the northern half of the loch, occupying a central position and is over 1/4 mile (400 m) in length with a width of 280 yards (260 m). The deepest part of the loch at 146 feet (45 m) is centrally located in the depression. There are three other smaller depressions.

On the western shore, between 1 1/4 and 1 1/2 miles (2 and 2.5 km) from the southern end of the loch, there is a sandy spit, which stretches out towards the centre of the loch.

Loch Lubnaig from the path to Ben Ledi, Scotland

== Gallery ==
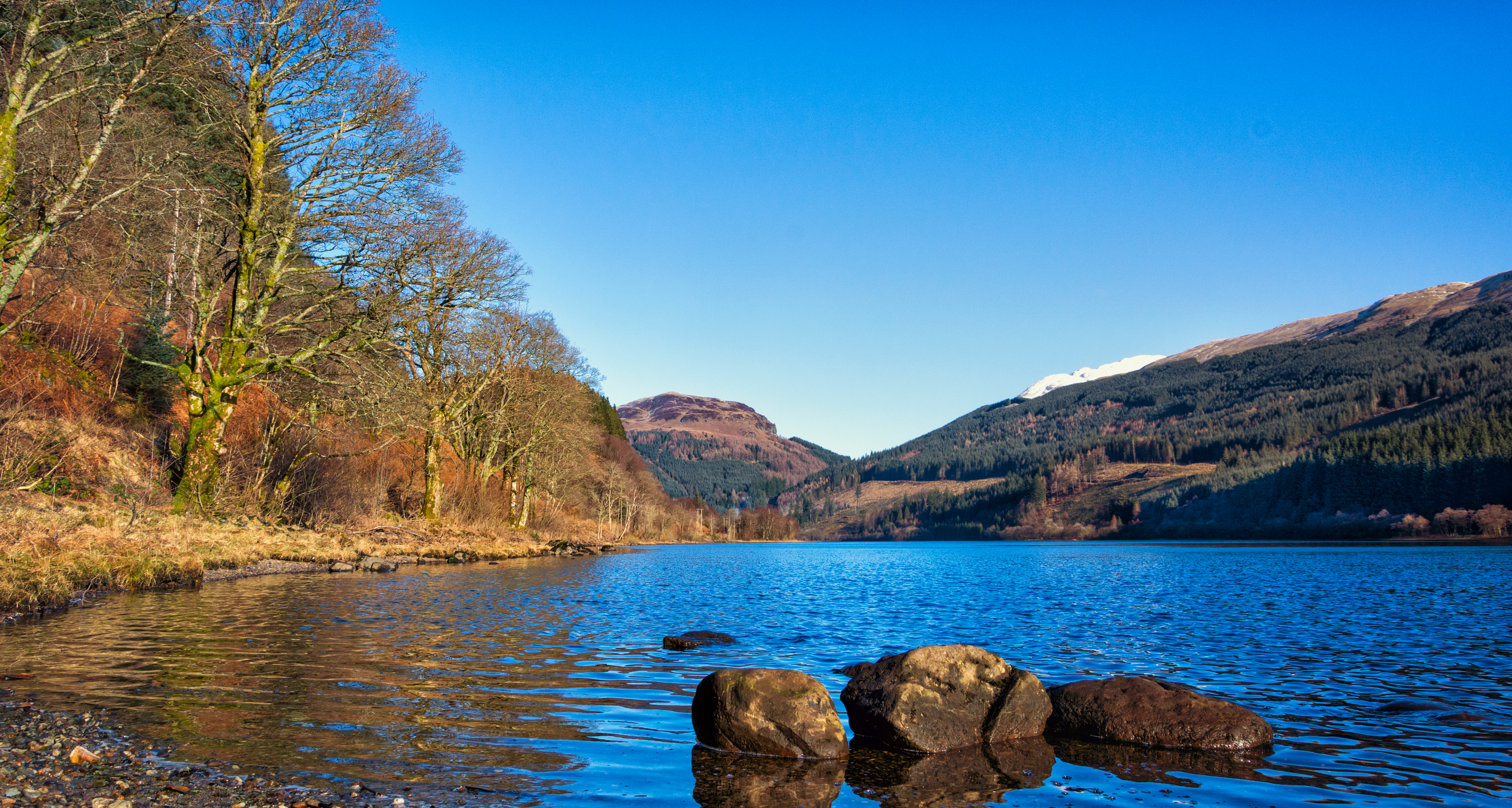

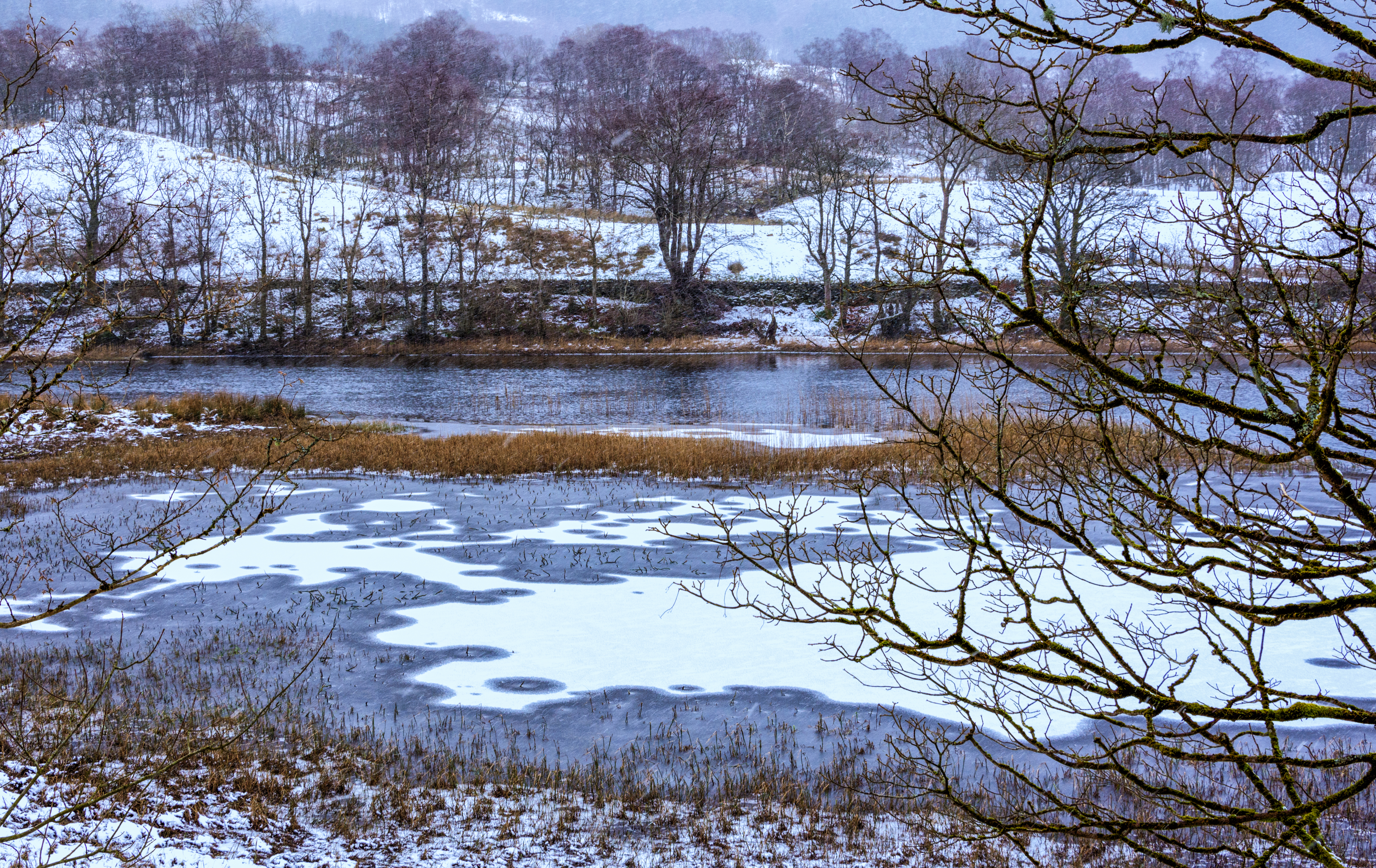

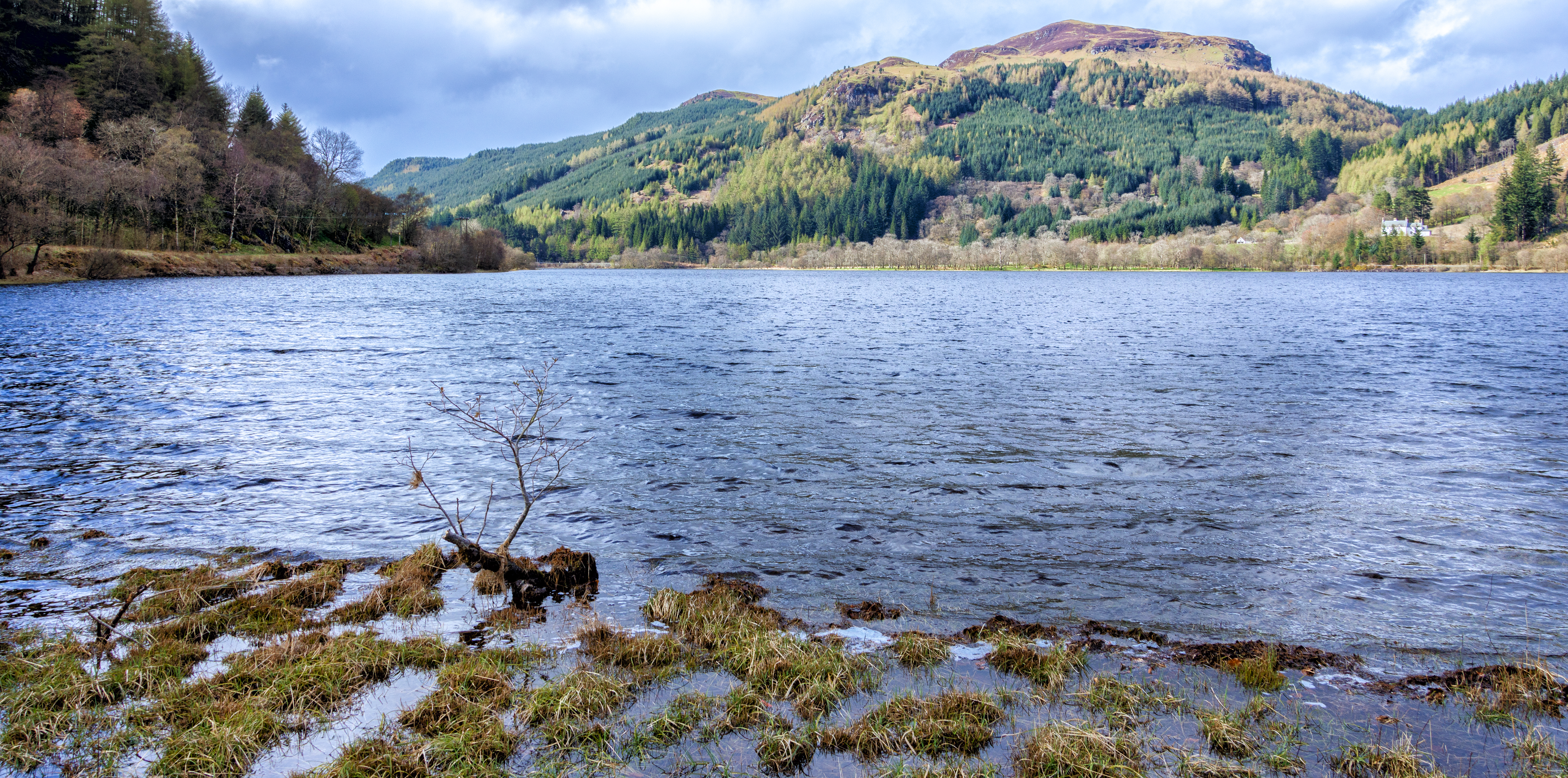

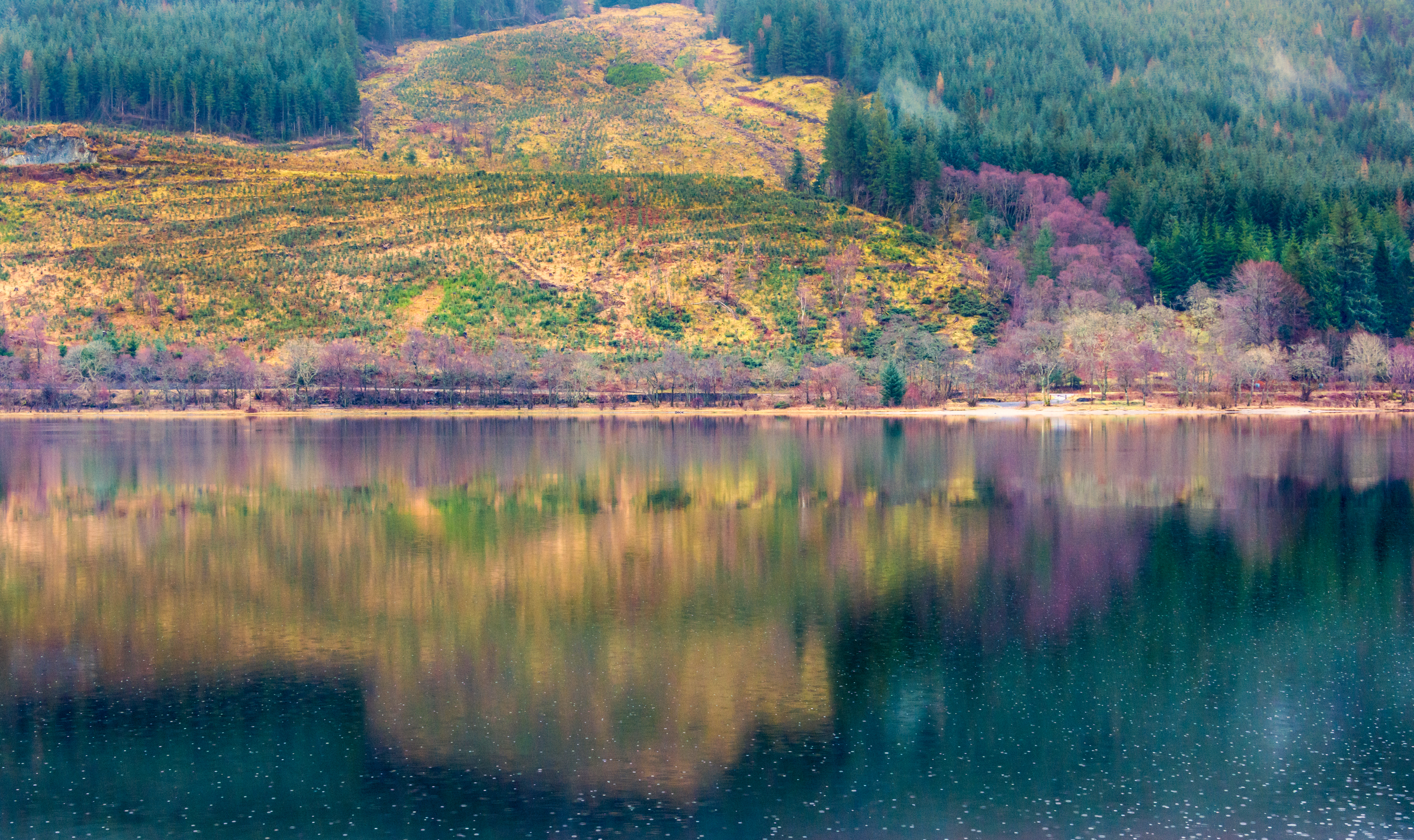
