= Crianlarich =

Coordinates: 56.394°N 4.617°W

Crianlarich: Scottish Gaelic: A' Chrìon Làraich; Scots: Crianlarich
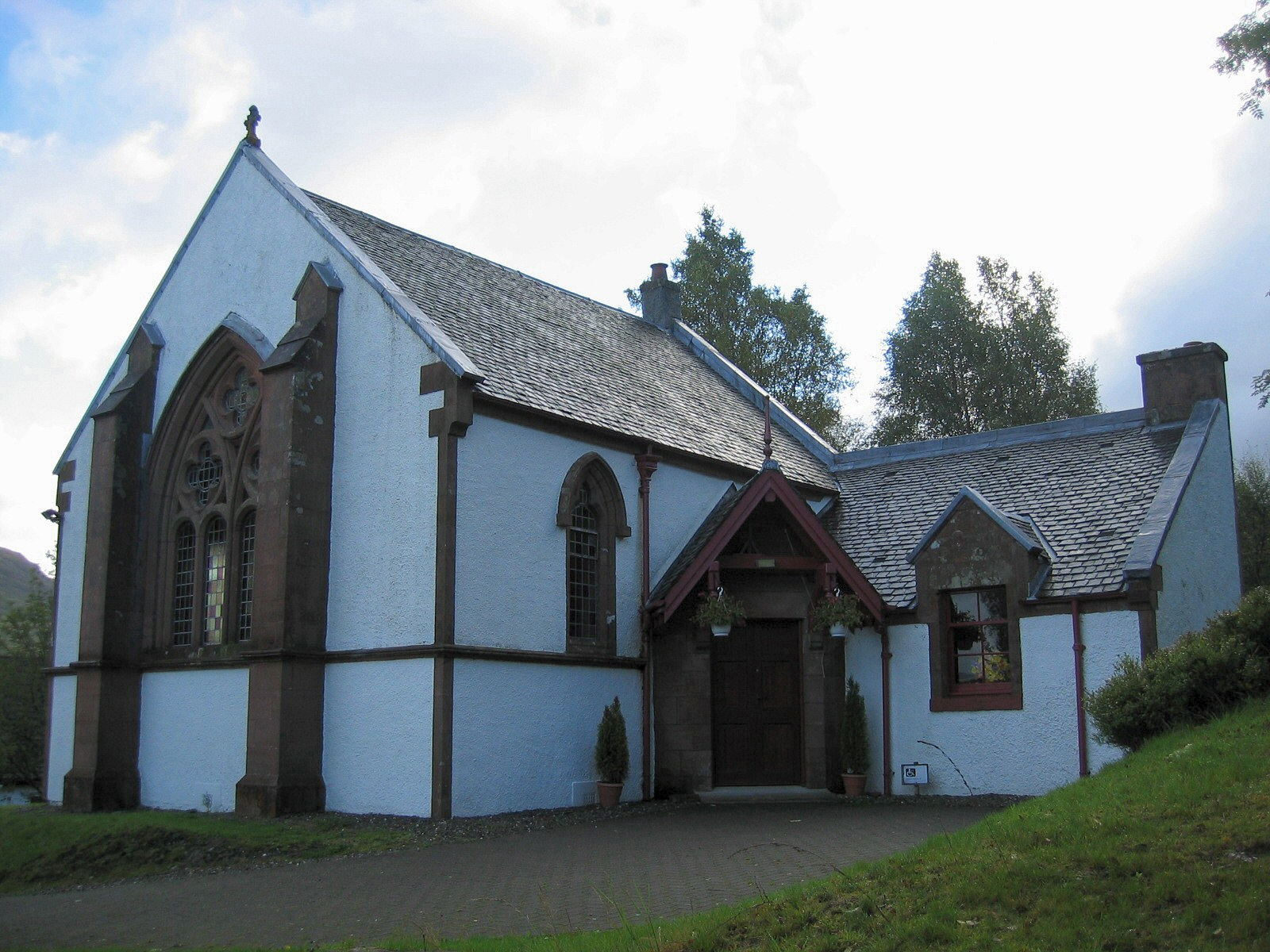
- Church of Scotland, Crianlarich

- Location within the Stirling council area
- Population: 185 (2001 Census)
- OS grid reference: NN385062
  - Edinburgh: 63 mi (101 km)
  - London: 384 mi (618 km)
- Civil parish: Killin
- Council area: Stirling
- Lieutenancy area: Stirling and Falkirk
- Country: Scotland
- Sovereign state: United Kingdom
- Post town: CRIANLARICH
- Postcode district: FK20
- Dialling code: 01838
- Police: Scotland
- Fire: Scottish
- Ambulance: Scottish
- UK Parliament: Stirling and Strathallan
- Scottish Parliament: Stirling

Crianlarich (/ˌkriːənˈlærɪx/; Scottish Gaelic: A' Chrìon Làraich) is a village in Stirling council area and in the registration county of Perthshire, Scotland, around six miles (ten kilometres) northeast of the head of Loch Lomond. The village bills itself as "the gateway to the Highlands".

== Etymology ==
The name Crianlarich is derived probably from the Gaelic meaning either "the wasted site" or "the aspen site" (cf. Gaelic critheann, "aspen").

== Situation ==
The village lies in the valley of Strath Fillan at the north western extent of the Trossachs, in the shadow of several Munro peaks, notably Ben More, but also Stob Binnein and Cruach Ardrain. Thus Crianlarich is very popular with hillwalkers. Also the village lies 40 miles (65 kilometres) along the long-distance footpath, the West Highland Way.

Its location makes Crianlarich a popular stop for tourists and there are a variety of types of overnight accommodation including guesthouses, B&Bs, a youth hostel operated by Hostelling Scotland, and a Best Western hotel.

== Transport connections ==
Crianlarich has been a major crossroads for north- and westbound journeys in Scotland since medieval times.

In the 1750s, two military roads met in the village; in the 19th century, it became a railway junction on what is now the West Highland Line; in the 20th century it became the meeting point of the major A82 and A85 roads. As such, it is designated a primary destination in Scotland, signposted from as far as Glasgow in the south, Perth in the east, Oban in the west and Fort William in the north. Since 2016 the A82 by-passes the centre of the village to avoid the low railway bridge.

The village is served by Crianlarich railway station located on the West Highland Line. The routes to Fort William/Mallaig and Oban diverge after this station. Access to the platform is via a flight of stairs from a subway that runs underneath the tracks, from the car park which is slightly lower than the station itself.

It is also served by a Scottish Citylink coach service up to hourly from Glasgow going on about every two hours to either Oban or Fort William.

In 2001, the village had a population of 185.

== Lochan Saorach ==
In nearby Glen Dochart lies Lochan Saorach, mentioned by Thomas Pennant in 1769 on account of the floating island it once contained.

== Gallery ==
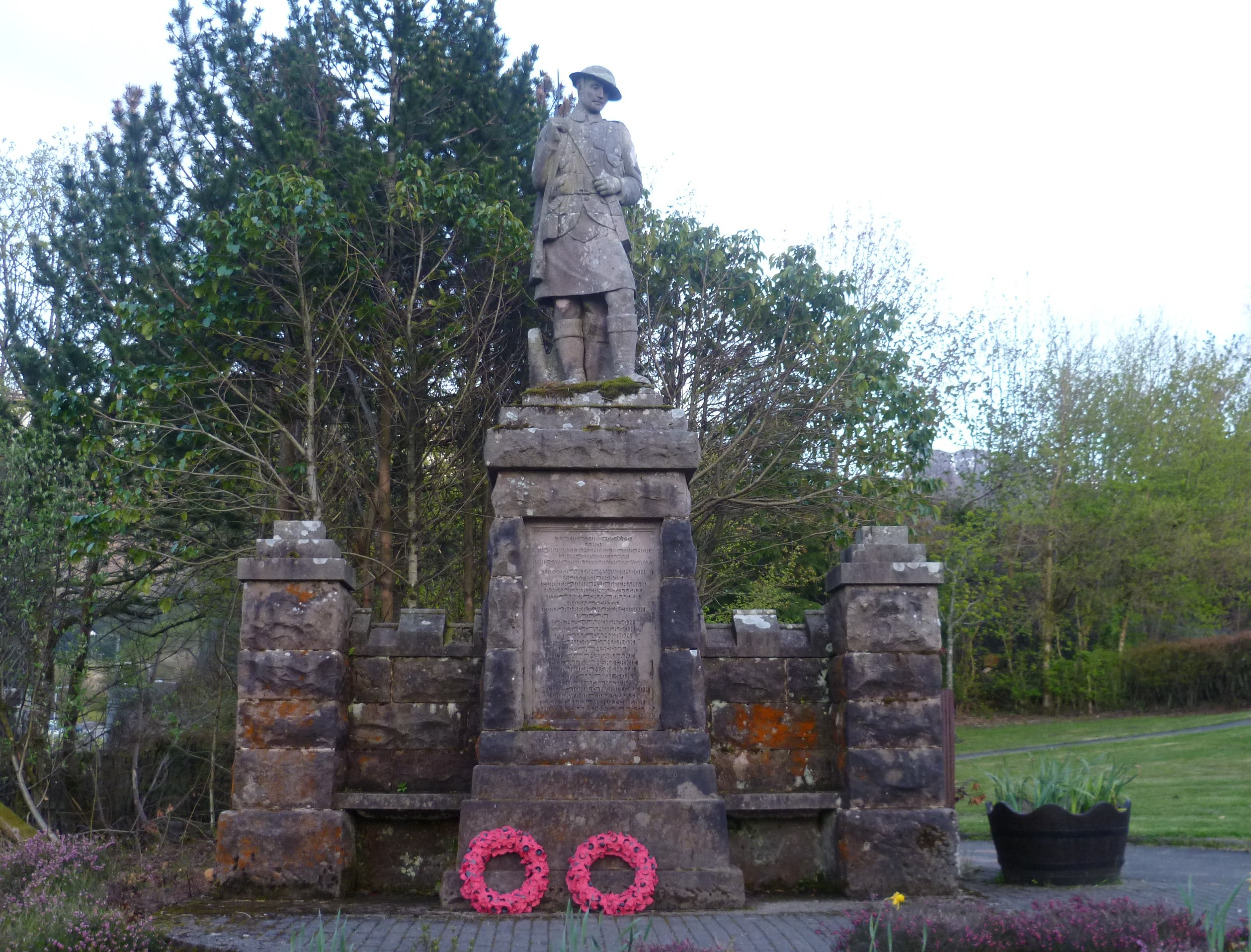
Crianlarich War Memorial

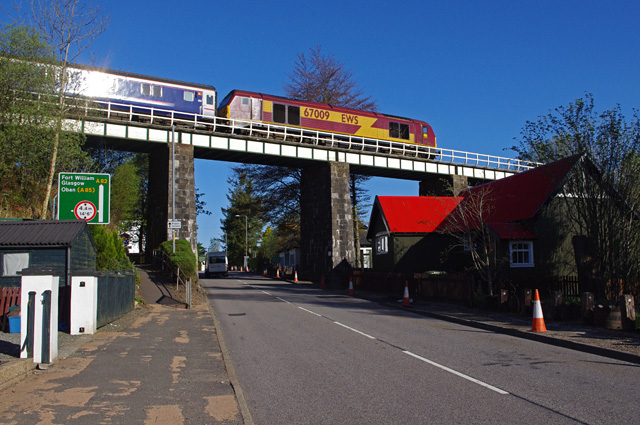
The Line to Fort William

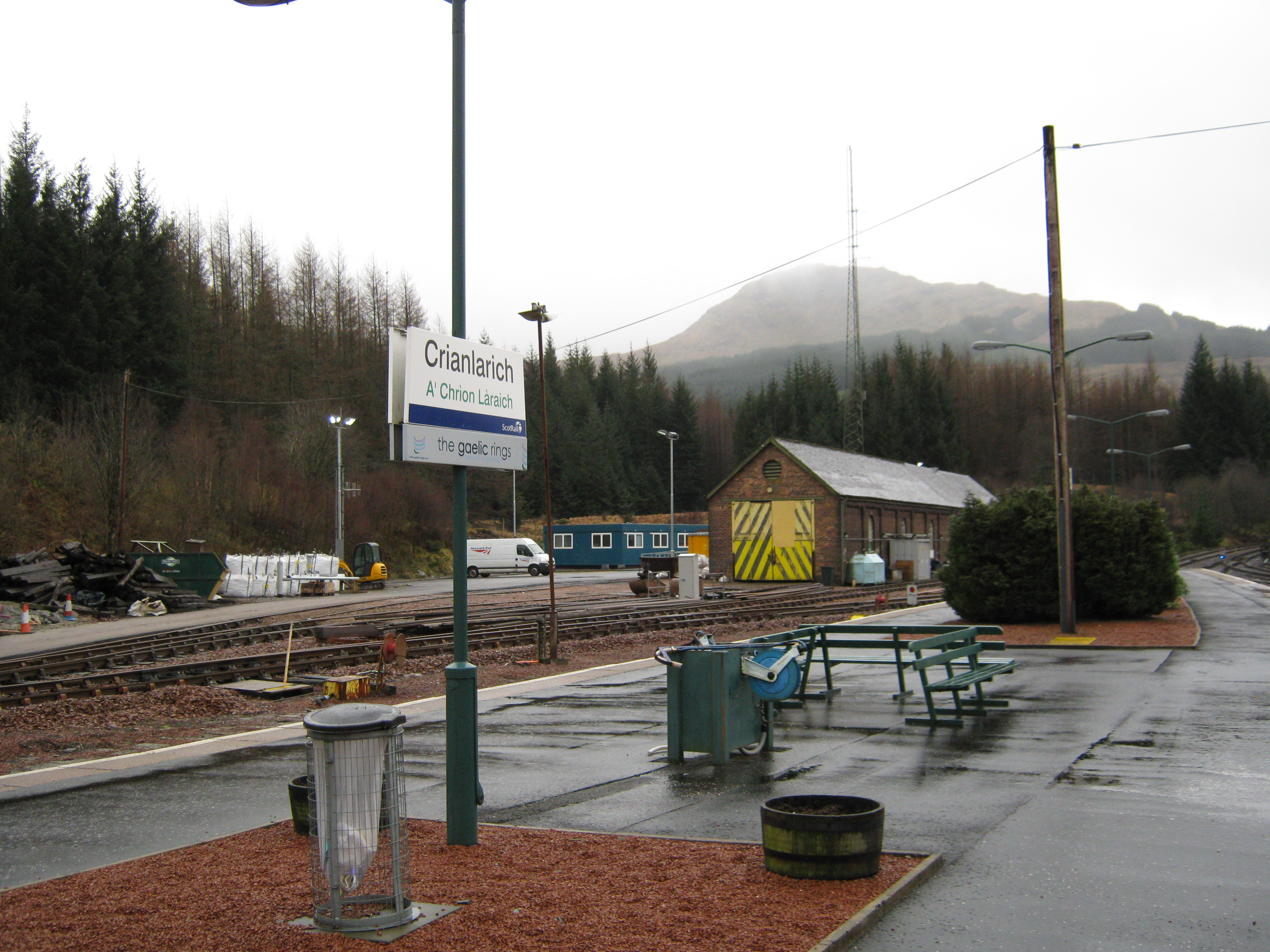
Crianlarich station

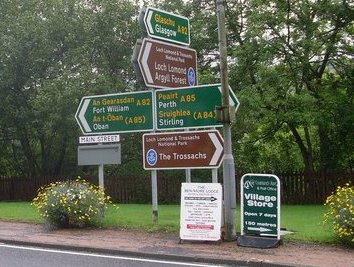
Meeting of the ways

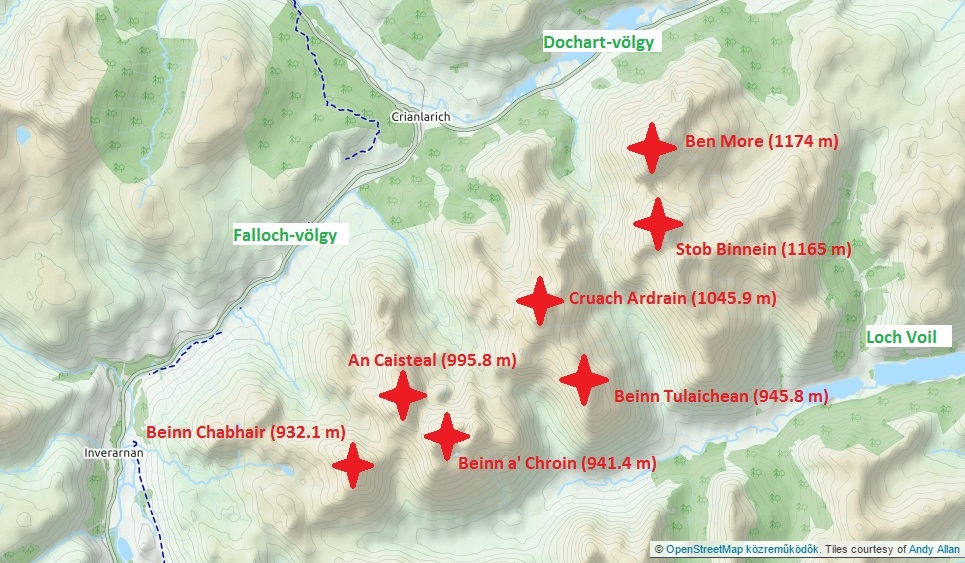
The Crianlarich Munros
