= Breadalbane, Scotland =

Region of the Scottish Highlands

Coordinates: 56.340°N 4.274°W

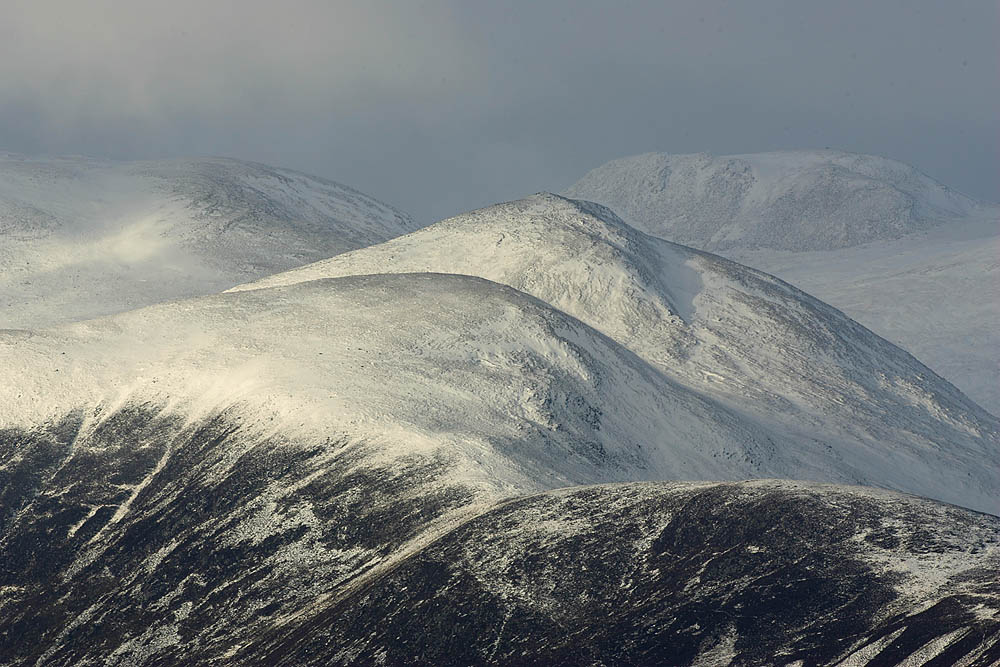
Breadalbane Hills in winter

Breadalbane (/brəˈdɔːlbən/; Scottish Gaelic: Bràghaid Albann, meaning "upper Alba" or "upland of Alba") is a region of the southern/central Scottish Highlands, within the Grampian Mountains range. It is a mountainous region comprising the watershed of Loch Tay; its boundaries are roughly the West Highland Way in the west, Rannoch Moor in the northwest, Loch Rannoch in the north, the River Tummel in the east, the Highland boundary in the southeast, and Loch Earn and Loch Voil-Loch Doine in the south. The former Breadalbane district was surrounded by the districts of Atholl, Strathearn, Menteith, The Lennox, Argyll and Lochaber. The Breadalbane Hydro-Electric Scheme lies within the region.

The Atholl and Breadalbane Gathering is a popular 2/4 March tune for the Great Highland Bagpipes.

== History ==
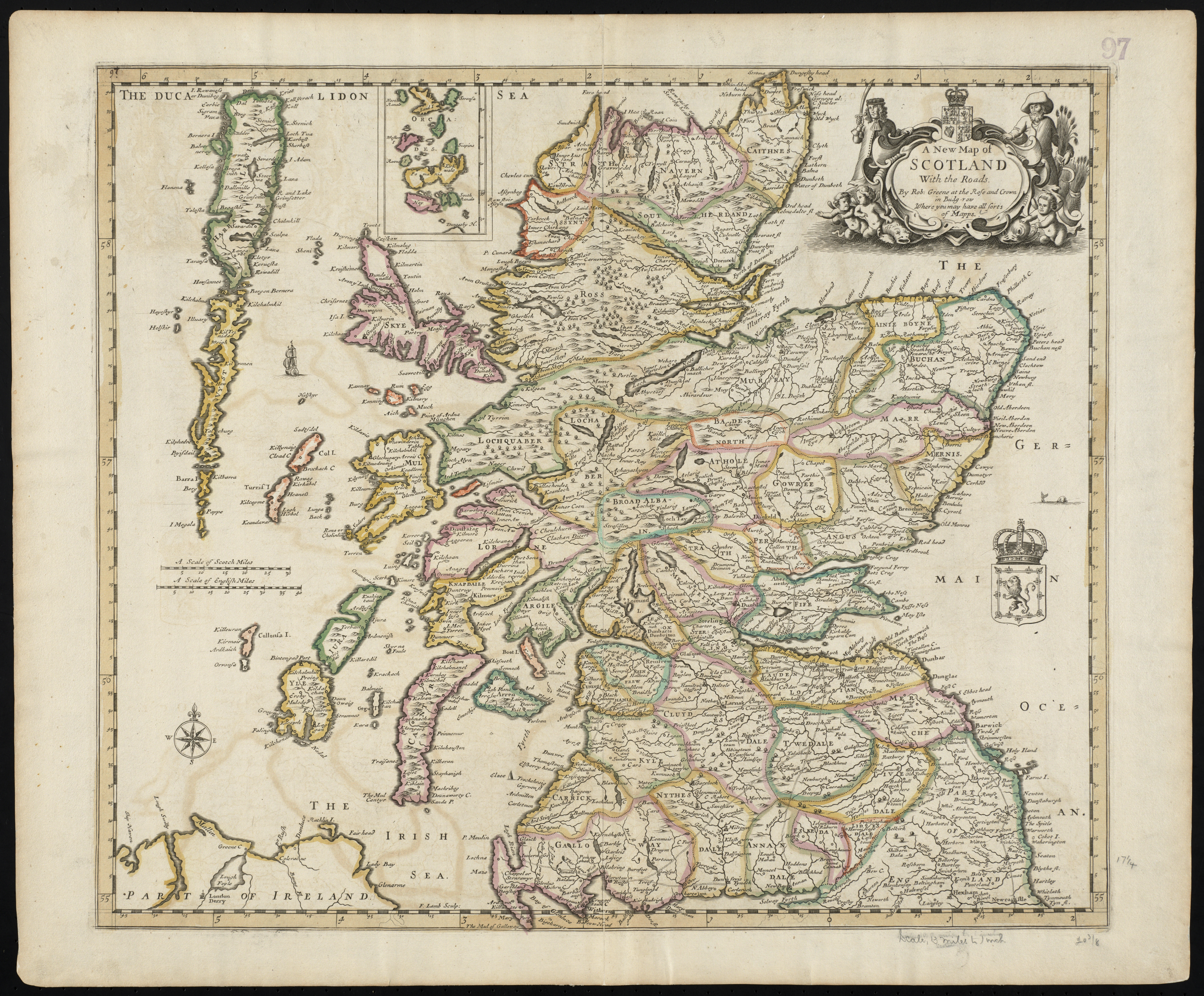
A 1689 map, showing the borders of Breadalbane as a distinct Province (in blue, at the centre of the map, as "broad alba-in")

Breadalbane formed one of the traditional provinces of Scotland, surrounded by Atholl, Lorn, Argyll, The Lennox, Menteith, and Strathearn (anti-clockwise from North). The province is referred to by the title of Earl of Breadalbane and Holland (the inclusion of Holland comes from a separate title which was inherited by the same person); later the title was upgraded to Marquess of Breadalbane.

The Breadalbane branch of Clan Campbell is the origin of the province as a distinct unit; prior to 1449 the area had been part of Atholl. Colin Campbell (second son of the head of Clan Campbell) was awarded the land by king James II as thanks for capturing the assassins of James I. The Campbells established the area's de facto independence from Atholl, and in 1681 were rewarded for their loyalty to the royal family by the formal conversion of the area into an independent Earldom, awarded to Colin Campbell's heir.

Breadalbane was at the centre of a vast area of central Scotland, comprising Atholl, Menteith, and Strathearn, which had been controlled by the assassins. Before them, Atholl, Menteith, and Lennox, had been controlled by James I's uncle Robert (and Robert's son, and Robert's son's father-in-law), who had ruled Scotland for three decades, while James I was imprisoned, and James' father was too frail; Robert had suppressed attempts to free James, and was suspected of assassinating James' older brother. The establishment of the Campbell presence in the region helped the king remove the danger from such a large central area with a habit of disloyalty.

As a largely rural and isolated area, shrieval oversight was provided by the sheriff based at Perth. Hence, when mid 19th century local government reforms replaced the ancient provinces by new Counties (shires), aligned to sheriffdom boundaries, Breadalbane formed part of the new county of Perthshire. Gradually Breadalbane once again became indistinguishable from Atholl.

== Loch Lomond and the Trossachs National Park ==
Much of Breadalbane is in the Loch Lomond and the Trossachs National Park. Ben More is the highest mountain in the national park.

The Breadalbane area of the National Park covers a larger region than the province of Breadalbane. It is subdivided into four communities, covered by the community council areas of Balquhidder, Killin, St Fillans, and Strathfillan. Balquhidder was not historically part of Breadalbane, although it was land owned by the Campbell family.

== Ecology ==
Breadalbane is known for containing some of, if not the, richest arctic-alpine flora in the United Kingdom. The area contains numerous Sites of Special Scientific Interest (SSSIs) and Special Areas of Conservation (SACs) for this reason, among many other natural heritage interests.

== Influence ==
Broadalbin, New York was named after Breadalbane.

There are Breadalbane Streets in both Toronto, Ontario, Canada and Hamilton, Ontario, Canada.

Breadalbane is a village in the province of Prince Edward Island in Canada.

Breadalbane, New South Wales is a small village located in the Southern Tablelands of New South Wales, Australia.
