= Dewar =

Dewar may refer to:

== People ==
- Arthur Dewar, Lord Dewar (1860–1917), Scottish politician and judge.
- Arthur Dewar (cricketer) (1934–2020), Scottish cricketer
- Connor Dewar (born 1999), Canadian ice hockey player
- Donald Dewar (Rt. Hon. Donald Campbell Dewar, 1937–2000), former Scottish politician and the first First Minister of Scotland
- Douglas Dewar (1875–1957), British ornithologist and critic of the theory of evolution
- Geordie Dewar (1867–1915), Scottish football player
- George Dewar (disambiguation), various people
- Isla Dewar (1946 – 2021), Scottish novelist and screenwriter
- Jackie Dewar (1923–2011), Scottish footballer
- Jacqueline Dewar, American mathematician
- James Dewar (disambiguation)
- Jim Dewar (disambiguation)
- John Dewar, 1st Baron Forteviot (1856–1929), Scottish businessman and MP
- John Dewar, 2nd Baron Forteviot (1885–1947), Scottish businessman and soldier
- John Michael Dewar (1883–1941), Scottish ornithologist
- Katherine Dewar (1943–2026), Canadian historian
- Kenneth Dewar (1879–1964), Vice-Admiral of the Royal Navy
- Kim Dewar, New Zealand swimmer
- Marion Dewar (1928–2008), Mayor of Ottawa, Canada, and MP
- Michael J. S. Dewar (1918–1997), English theoretical chemist
- Neil Dewar (1908–1982), Scottish football player
- Paul Dewar (1963–2019), Canadian teacher and MP
- Ron Dewar (1941–2024), American jazz saxophonist, clarinetist, and bassoonist
- Thomas Dewar, 1st Baron Dewar (1864–1930), Scottish whisky distiller
- William McLachlan Dewar, headmaster of George Heriot's School in Edinburgh, Scotland
- Michael Kenneth O’Malley Dewar (1942–2016), chief of Clan Dewar

== Places ==
- Dewar (crater), a lunar impact crater
- Dewar Nunatak, Adelaide Island, Antarctica
- Dewar, Scottish Borders, Scotland
- Dewar, Iowa, United States
- Dewar, Oklahoma, United States
- Dewar Creek, British Columbia, Canada

== Other uses ==
- Clan Dewar
- Dewar (caste), a fishing caste from India
- Vacuum flask, also known as a Dewar flask, a vacuum-insulated container used to maintain internal temperature for extended periods, named after British chemist James Dewar
  - Cryogenic storage dewar, a specialized vacuum flask for extremely cold fluids
- Dewar benzene, an isomer of benzene named after James Dewar
- Dewar's, makers of a blended Scotch whisky, named after John Dewar and sons

== See also ==
- Devar, 1966 Indian film
- Divar, island in Goa, India
- Divar (website), Iranian classifieds website
- Deewaar (disambiguation)
