= Deuchars =

Deuchars may refer to:

== People with the surname ==
- Louis Deuchars (1870–1927), Scottish artist and sculptor
- Marion Deuchars (born 1964), British illustrator and author
- Captain Deuchars, of Princess Charlotte (1814 ship)

== Other uses ==
- Deuchars IPA, a beer brand of Caledonian Brewery

== See also ==
- Deuchar, a surname
- Dewar (Dewar na Ferg) of Perthshire, whose name may be derived from Deuchars
