= Dewar (Dewar na Ferg) of Perthshire =

Branch of the Scottish Clan Dewar

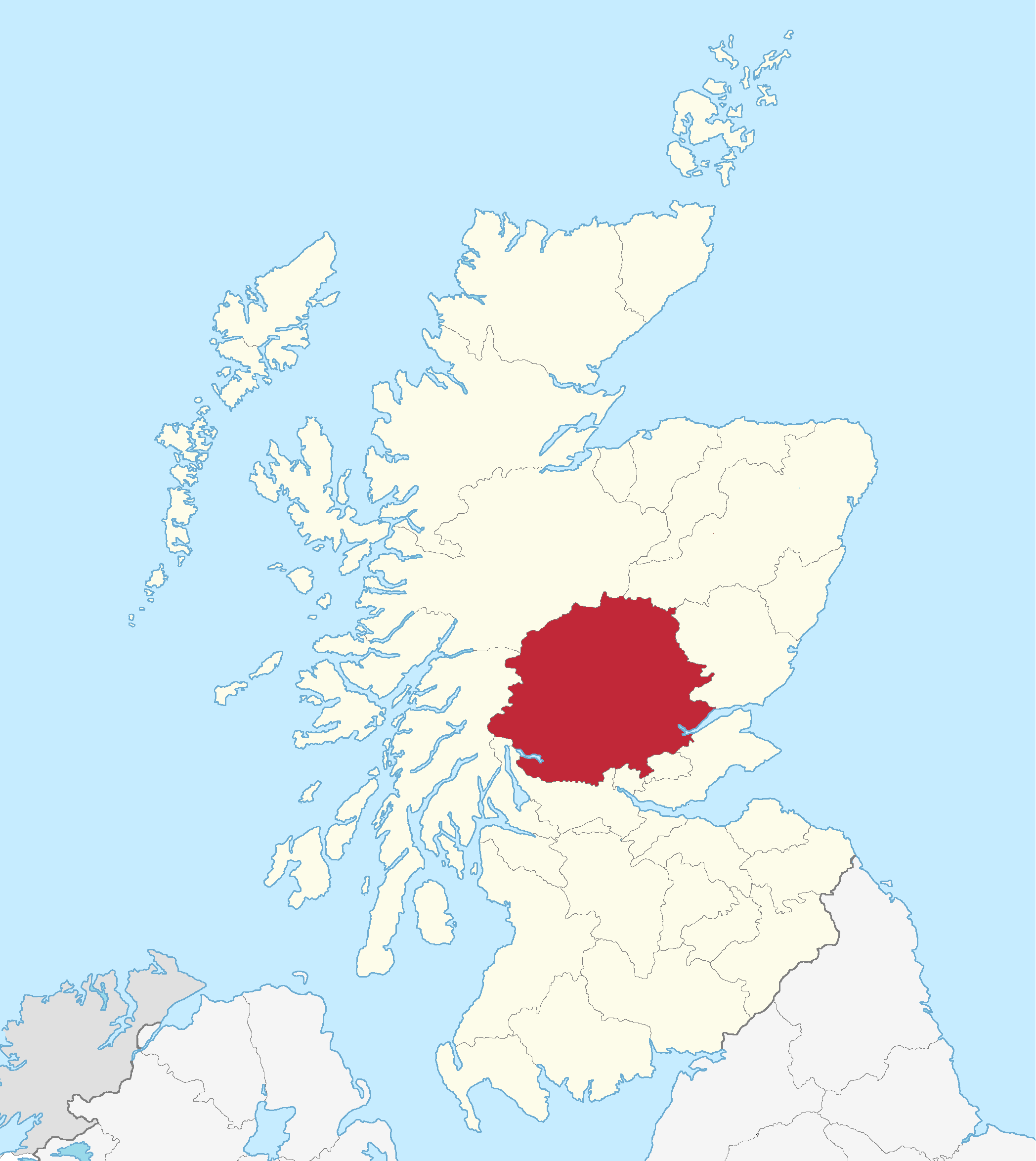
Location of Perthshire

The Dewar na Ferg is a branch of the Scottish Clan Dewar, originating in Perthshire. They are best known for their claim to be the rightful keepers of Saint Fillan's holy relics; especially the Stone (Ferg).

== Dewar Origins ==
The name of Dewar or Dewere like most Scottish surnames has evolved through the centuries and in many variations. Sometimes known as Deoir, Doire or Deoireach as derived from the ancient Jore, the name Deuchars is also believed by many to be a variation of Dewar. In the Western Isles, Dewar was sometimes referred to as Mac Gllie Dheodradha (son of the Dewar's lad). Indeed, two families bearing that name in Skye simplified this to Macleora (also known as MacClure) and Macindeor and in many documents. It was a common practice to refer to an individual by both his known names, for example, 'Deoir or Dewere' where the spelling and recording of either were determined only by the pronunciation and writing skills of the author. Dewar is certainly derived from the ancient Gaelic descriptive word 'deoir' meaning stranger, pilgrim or wanderer. However, there is a title and office of 'dewar' from the 'deoradh' that has early 11th-century origins and is normally attributed to that of 'relic keeper' or 'custodian' mostly associated with Saint Fillan's ministry in the Breadalbane country.

=== Later references ===
There is a historical reference to Dewar in the 'Ragman Rolls', which is described as '...the Submission and Fealty sworne by the Generality of all the Scots Nation to King Edward I between the years 1292 to 1298’. It records a Thomas de Dewere and Piers de Dewere, both of the place Dewar in the parish of Heriot, Midlothian in the county of Edinburgh, 'did render true and rightful homage to King Edward I of England' at Berwick-on-Tweed on the 28th day of August in the year 1296. In the 'Scottorum Historiae' (1527) Hector Boece suggests that Thomas de Dewere and Piers de Dewere were descendants of a Malcolm Robert Dewere, formerly of Ewich near Strathfillan and Glen Dochart, who received land in Heriot as a reward for slaying a marauding wolf 'muckle feart' in the district. Malcolm named this land as Dewere, now Dewar, and was known thereafter as Malcolm de Dewere or 'Dewer the Wolf'. The story of the slaying of this wolf forms an interesting connection to Saint Fillan, where legends attribute a more extravagant miracle to this recalcitrant monk. It appears a wolf, feared in the district, killed Fillan's oxen but through the Saint's prayers, the wolf submitted to Fillan and took the oxen's place as his beast of burden.

Over two centuries later, on 24 February 1474, a 'Charter' granted by William, Lord Borthwick, confirmed a William Dewar in ownership and possession of Dewar lands. This ownership of Dewar remained with the family along with that of Harper-rig until the year 1618 when, under some pressure to raise promised funds for the church, William Dewar de Eodem sold all these lands to Lady Maxwell of Newbattle.

=== Descendants and relatives ===
The descendants of Thomas and Piers Dewar continued over several hundred years until in 1693 the estate was acquired by the Cranstoun family. In 1890 Joseph Young Trotter-Cranstoun reaffirmed the 'arms' that can still be seen over the door of the Dewar farm. Their pedigree is listed in Burke's Landed Gentry (1914).

There are a number of other early references to Dewars and Dewar families associated with the relics of St Fillan. During the reign of William I, in a confirmation to the St Andrews Cathedral Priory, included '-the church of Tealing (Angus) with the 'priest's toft' and the 'letters and toft of the deoradh', indicating the importance of the keeper's position in formal church ceremonial.

== Saint Fillan and the Holy Relics ==
=== Background ===
Fillan, also known as Foelan or Fulan was the eldest son of Feriach, grandson of King Ceallach of Leinster. He became a monk in the Abbey of Saint Fintan Munnu before he was twenty and arrived in Scotland from Ireland circa 734 AD, along with his mother St. Kentigerna and Uncle or kinsman Comgan.

Originally Fillan settled near the St Andrew's Monastery in Fife where, in due course he was elected Abbot. He resigned this post and after a few years as a missionary monk in Wexford, he returned to Scotland to resume a hermetical life near Glen Dochart, in Perthshire. Here he built a church and became renowned for his miracles, especially his healing of the sick and the 'dafties'. Pilgrims brought their sick 'o' mind charges from all over Scotland to be cured at Strathfillan. Usually the poor souls deemed mentally ill were dipped into a pool and then left tied up in Fillan's chapel overnight. If they had freed themselves by morning they were proclaimed cured. This practice continued long after Fillan, well into the 19th century.

=== Saint Fillan's times ===
Various and differing accounts attribute extravagant miracles and deeds to him including that of the conversion of the wolf. Nonetheless, St Fillan lived through some of the most important years of the Medieval Church. In 700 AD about the time of his birth, the Psalms were translated into Anglo Saxon. The Lindisfarne Gospels were produced and Benedictine missionaries completed the conversion of England begun by Gregory the Great. One year after Fillan stepped ashore in Scotland the Venerable Bede wrote his History of the English Church and People in Latin and Irish monks established early medieval art as used for the Book of Kells. St Fillan's feast day is still celebrated on 9 or 19 January, depending where you are but the 19th is the recorded date of his death.

=== Relics and miracles ===
==== The Crozier ====
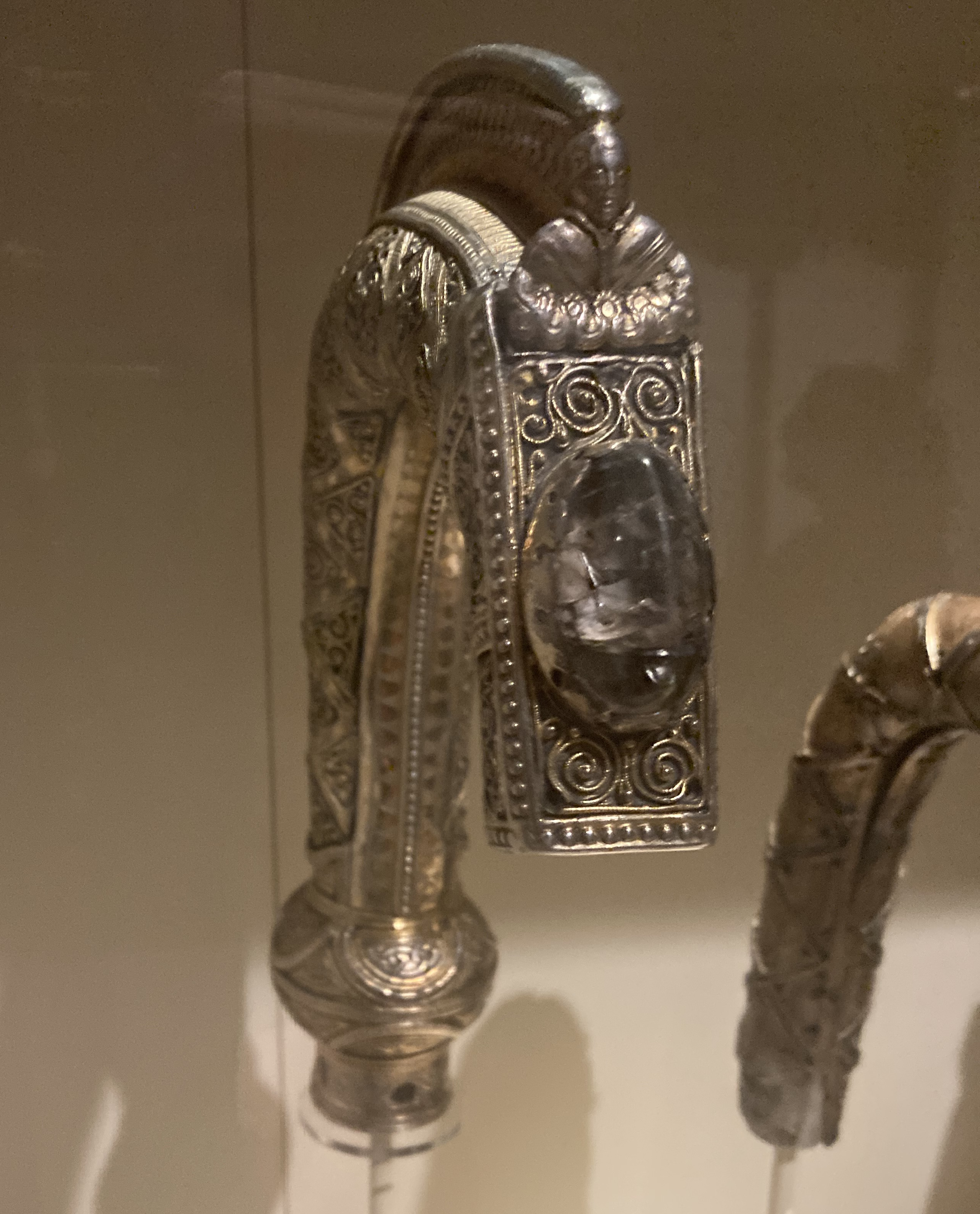
St. Fillan’s Crozier, with the Coigreach to the right

A number of relics are associated with St Fillan. It is almost certain they were held by separate Dewar families, but in all likelihood these families were probably related through marriage. The origin of the most well known relic, the crozier, is still uncertain but it is recorded as a simple shepherd's staff with the head, handle or crook, covered in bronze sometime in the 11th century. This in turn was covered by an elaborate silver crozier-head in the early 14th century following some malicious damage to the original.

The owner or bearer of the Crozier became known as the 'Coigerach', which in literal translation also means 'pilgrim' or 'wanderer', possibly a name association or as a result of the many places to which this hereditary keeper carried the Crozier. The Coigerach acted as healer, messenger and guardian to the people of Glen Dochart and, with the aid of the Crozier, he was reputed to have pursued and retrieved lost or stolen goods including sheep and cattle — an enterprise rewarded by a payment of fourpence, or gift of shoes in addition to entitlement of beef, meal or mead from each family of Glen Dochart. The Crozier was venerated and reputed to have various healing and sanctified properties.

==== The Bell ====
Another famous relic, the Bell was a common instrument carried by traveling monks and other holy men. Malcolm Dewar na Bernane had custody of this particular relic which is reputed to have ninth-century French origins. The Bell was known locally as the 'bearnane' or 'the bear's ane' or sometimes 'little gapped one'. It is about twelve inches in height and is a one piece cast of bronze alloy. Curiously it has no clapper again bearing likeness to those carried by early French monks. The Bell seemed to have some significance though; certainly enough to ensure it was carried in procession at the coronation of King James IV at Scone in 1488. Saint Fillan's Bell disappeared for almost two hundred years most likely hidden away to prevent its destruction by reformists, and for a period it was also believed to have been cursed. For some time following the Reformation it sat on a tombstone in the old churchyard of Strathfillan and, like the Crozier and Stane was used in rites to cure the sick and insane. It was stolen c.1799 and again it disappeared, this time for a mere seventy years until recovered in Herefordshire by the Bishop of Brechin who returned it to Scotland. Both the Bell and Crozier are now displayed in Edinburgh.

==== The Stone ====
Of St Fillan's Stone (stane) the 'Ferg', much less is known. In fact there is very little reference to the stone as a 'relic' except as a footnote to a copy-translation of a papal letter dated 1252. This stane's importance was largely ignored by historians until the discovery of this papal letter in 1896. The 'footnote' appears on the first copy-translation, completed c. 1519 at the Abbey of Saint-Amand de Bouvines. This copy document was later transferred to the Monastery de la Daurade in Toulouse c. 1524 and a translation remains in a collection of papers belonging to the De Guise family, now lodged with the Bibliothèque Nationale. This papal letter is further referred to in correspondence between Mary Queen of Scots and Catherine de Médicis.

Two further 'authorised translations' were published in London in 1874 and a new illustrated copy of the original translation was authorized by the Vatican in 1999 and completed by Sister Maximillian at the Hermitage of Our Lady & St Nicodemus in Scotland. Further reference to the 'Stane' is found in Queen Mary's letter or charter of 1563 to Malise Dewere.

==== Malcolm and the Stone ====
It is quite likely that this 'Letter of Office' granted to Malcolm Robert (Dewere) Jore in 1252 by Pope Innocent IV clearly recognized Malcolm as a 'deoradh' or 'relic keeper' stating: 'You also, Malcolm Robert Jore, Deoradh, and your successors, who can now display Our confidence and authority with skillful energy, in labouring for the salvation of souls in the preservation of Our faith by the safekeeping of Our Holy Relic of Saint Fillan'.

Malcolm is thought to have made pilgrimage to France in that year to collect this letter and taking with him Fillan's 'stane' for protection. Three years later however in 1255, in a letter to Henry III of England from Alexander III of Scotland, this same Malcolm Jore is listed as a 'bishop-elect' of Glen Dochart being amongst those 'removed' from the King's council 'because their faults so demand'.

In 1276 Master Baiamundus de Vitia, Canon of Asti and appointed Papal Collector exempted all churches venerating any relics of Saint Fillan, from any taxes due to Rome. Vatican archives record no less than seven relics associated with Saint Fillan and two other Dewar families had relics attributed to this Saint in their safekeeping. The Dewar na Man certainly had custody of the Saint's forearm bone and the Dewar De Messer kept the Saint's missal.

==== Last records of the Stone ====
The Stone as a Holy Relic is recorded by the papal archivist Giuseppe Garampi in the late eighteenth century. In the Scottish Historical Manuscripts, Archie Moncrief recalls 'the stane, as displayed and venerated at Murthly Kirk' before being formally returned to the Dewar na Ferg, the 'deoradh' from whose family it is understood ours is descendant.

== The Dewars in History ==
=== Robert the Bruce ===
It is recorded in several sources that Dewar families fought with the Scottish armies at the Battle of Bannockburn on 24 June 1314. It is known that before the battle, Robert the Bruce and his army received Holy Communion and that Saint Fillan's Crozier, in the custody of Malcolm Deor or Jore, along with the forearm bone of that Saint 'was elevated by Abbot Maurice of Inchaffray before some 10,000 men'. It is most likely the Bell and Stone in the custody of their individual keepers were also present on this occasion.

Following his victory over the English at Bannockburn and as a mark of thanksgiving, King Robert I, (as the Bruce had become), established a church at Tyndrum in Strathfillan which he dedicated to Saint Fillan. King Robert also recognised the right of Malcolm Deor or Jore and his heirs and successors, as 'Coarb of Saint Fillan', to 'bear wi honeste undertakn hs haly lettres of office' It is however understood this latter title was bestowed singly on the custodian of the Crozier and does not include other custodians. There exists a letter of confirmation of lands in Ewich of Glen Dochart in favour of Donald M'Sobrell, also known as MacSobrell Deoir and Dewar Coigerach, dated 1336.

=== Later developments ===
On 22 April 1428, at an Inquest in Kindrochit Castle held by the Baillie of Glen Dochart, Baillie John de Spense of Perth 'upheld the authority and privileges of Findlay Jore, also named as Deoir' recognizing Findlay as the rightful Dewar Coigerach as gifted by the Coarb of Saint Fillan, known then in the Celtic tradition, as Hereditary Abbot of Glen Dochart. Finally, in a further hearing at the Court of the Baillie of Glen Dochart on 9 February 1468, a John Molcalloum M'Gregor, defending a claim for rents by a Lady Margaret Stirling of Glenorchy, asserted the lands he held at Corehynan in Auchertyre, were gifted by the Deoir de Meser and the Deoir Coigerach.

=== Final disposition ===
On 6 July 1487 a letter of gift, decree and deed of confirmation from King James III, was given under the Privy Seal in Edinburgh to Findlay Jore's son, Malise Deoir or Dewar, who was to be secured in the peaceful possession of the Holy Relic of Saint Fillan called the 'Quigrich'. This document further declares that the King understands that 'Malice Deoir, or Dewar and his forebears has had an relic of Sanct Fulane callit the Quergich in keping.. ..sen the tyme of King Robert the Bruys', and before then, and that they were in no way responsible to any persons, either spiritual or temporal, with regard the relic. The King also commands his subjects to grant all possible facilities to Malise in the discharge of his duties and in no way to hinder, or impede him passing with the relic, through the country 'as he and his forebearis were wont to do'. The King's subjects were further charged to see that Malise 'was kept unthrallit and free in the use of the relic under all the hiest paine'.

== The Dewar Family since the 16th century ==
=== The saga of the Stone continues ===
In August 1527 Archibald Deoir the great-grandson of Malise Deoir or 'Dewar the Younger' and son of Archibald Deoir, 'Dewar na Ferg' married Maria Jane Parcevaux of Rochelle in France. Maria Jane was a direct descendant of Maurice Parcevaux, (1325–1376) Champion of Combat and Governor of La Rochelle in France. The Parcevaux family coats of arms bear a striking similarity to that later adopted by the Irish family O'Dwyer but there is no available record showing a line of descent or any connection. The marriage of Maria and Archibald is recorded in the 'Nobiliare et Armorial De Bretagne' reprinted in 1970.

In 1547 a claim was made by Hugh Currie, then Prior of Strathfillan, to the relics and remains of Malise Deoir, also known as Deoir-na-Quigrich and, in separate claims, for those relics held by Malcolm Deoir, Dewar-na-Bernane, keeper of St. Fillan's Bell and Archibald Deoir, Dewar-na-Ferg, custodian of St. Fillan's Stone (a descendant of Malcolm Dewar, 'Dewere the Wolf'). This claim was vigorously defended and finally dismissed by the Lords of the Privy Council. Two years later however, on 4 March 1551, the Register of the Great Seal records that Mary, Queen of Scots levied charges of 40 shillings annually, singly upon Malise Deoir, or Dewere, his heirs and successors, for all his lands and properties at Croitendeor and Ewich in Aucharne and Cragwoken in Glen Dochart, which were hitherto exempt.

Then, some twelve years after the aforementioned charges were levied against Malise Deoir, Queen Mary had an apparent 'change of heart' towards some Dewar families and, no doubt influenced by the growing pressures of the Reformation, granted a Letter or Charter of Protection to Malise, Dewere na Ferg. The letter is dated 27 August 1563 and in it she refers directly to Malise's rightful title and role as 'keeper' of a relic of Saint Fillan, 'takis vnder oure speciale protectioun supple maintenance defence and saufgard, our loyal servitour Malise Dewere and hs successours of our burgh of Perth, in keping wi an relick of Saint Filane callit the Stane'. In Charter dated 2 December 1575 and confirmed in 1583 by King James VI, Donald Macindeorca, also known as Macindeor vic Coigerach, sold the Dewar lands to Duncan Campbell of Glenorchy.

=== 17th to the early 19th centuries ===
The Dewar's (na Ferg) seemed to have survived the next two hundred years avoiding the gibbet and the axe but there are few references to our family of any note until 1792 when Robert, son of Robert Dewar and Margaret Kincaid of Killen married a Mary Peat (also spelled as Peatt) on 7 December 1792 at Kilmany. Mary was the daughter of Maria Peat ne Rosz or Rousza. The Rousza family (?) arrived at Greenock from Hungary in February 1765. From surviving Parish records Maria is known to have married James Peat, a prominent trader and ship owner from Glasgow. Subsequently, Mary Rose Peat was born in 1773 at Doune near Dunblane. The Peat family was well respected by society and Mary was well educated. At the young age of sixteen she appears to have gained employment in the Edinburgh home of the Douglases of Cavers as a ladies companion from 1788 until 1791. During this employment, Mary became acquainted with and befriended a number of important persons through the Douglases. One of these was the Borders poet John Leyden (1775–1811). Leyden's father also worked for the Douglas family and John was probably attending the University of Edinburgh at that time.

Even after her marriage to Robert Dewar, Mary's friendship and obvious financial support to Leyden continued until 1803 when Leyden took up a position as Assistant Surgeon to the Madras Establishment in India. Among the family's papers is a letter from Leyden written on 5 April 1803 at Portsmouth (...two days from London) whilst waiting to sail to Madras. In this he mentions dining with Mary's younger brother James and with Walter Scott (...who is just arrived) and his association with other notables. He promises to write again following his arrival in India but no record of any further correspondence exists. John Leyden never returned to his native land as he died on Java on 28 August 1811.

=== 19th century to the present ===
Three generations on, William Martin Dewar married Margaret Bayne on 25 November 1881 at Kinnoull in the County of Perth acknowledging Margaret's illegitimate son Robert Bayne who was born on 30 August 1876. Robert Bayne Dewar later worked as a ploughman/farmer at Inchture and married Edith McEwan Jack, a domestic servant at Inchture on 18 November 1898. Robert and Edith had ten children but the male heir was the youngest, John Cameron Dewar, born 11 May 1918 at Millbridge, Kinross-shire. John married Catherine Baxter Ramsay on 6 February 1937. John served with the Royal Air Force between 1938 and 1946. He then worked as a market gardener with John Ogilvie Millar. Some years later he became Factor/Gardener to Lord Ogilvie at Teases Estates in Fife. Catherine and John had three children of whom two, John and Patricia survive. John Cameron Dewar died in Edinburgh on 5 January 1983 and Catherine Baxter Dewar on 13 November 2006.

== John Dewar's folk tales ==
In 1859 a John Dewar working as a woodsman for George Campbell, 8th Duke of Argyll at Glendaruel, sent a letter to his employer enclosing a copy of the Gaelic text of his 'Tales of the Gael on the Wintry Nights' as an example of his work. There is no record of why he did this in the Campbell papers of that time; but soon after, John was enabled to devote his whole time to gathering folk tales throughout the Highlands. Working under the direction of J.F. Campbell of Islay, he spent many years traveling around the West Highlands recording these tales in the Gaelic language. By the time Dewar had finished his work they had become the largest and most important collection of popular and local tradition ever written down by one man. These collected works became known to scholars as the 'Dewar Manuscripts'. John Dewar died in 1872 at the age of 70 years.
