= Strath Fillan Priory =

Priory in Scotland

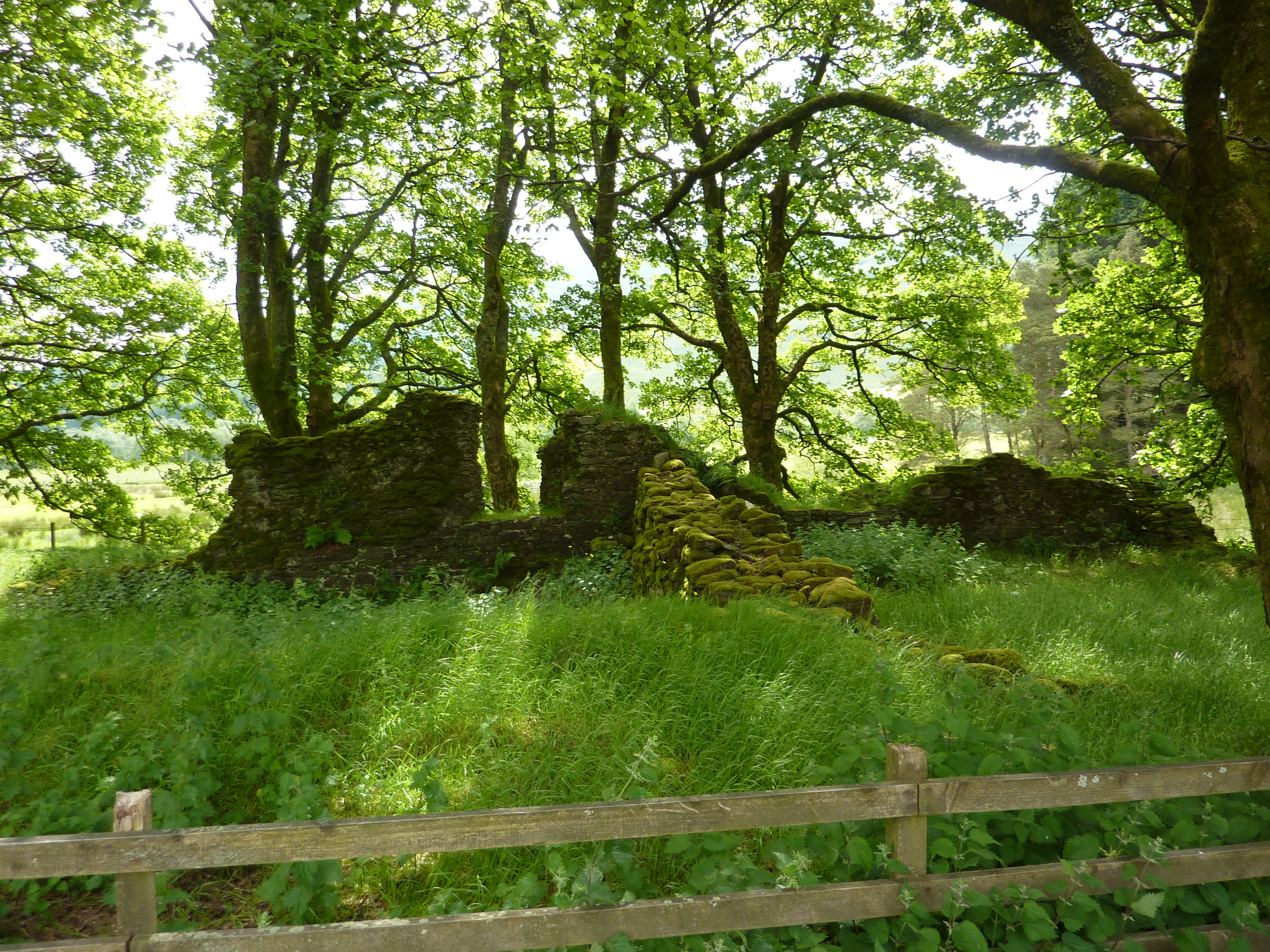
Site of St Fillan's Priory

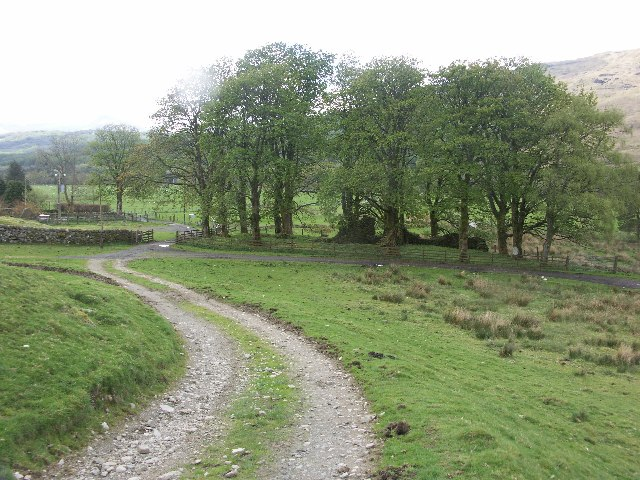
Road leading to the ruins of the chapel

Strath Fillan Priory was a small Augustinian Priory based at Strath Fillan in Argyll (now in the Stirling council area). It seems to have been founded in 1318 by Robert I, King of Scots, and given to the canons of Inchaffray Abbey in order to properly celebrate St Fillan, a saint popular with the 14th century kings of Scotland. It had royal patronage after the Scottish Reformation.

By 1607 it was a Campbell possession, when it was incorporated into the secular lordship of Archibald (Gilleasbaig) Campbell of Glencarradale.

== Priors ==
The Prior of Strath Fillan was the head of the Augustinian monastic community. The priors are badly documented and few are known.

=== List of known priors ===
- John de Mortimer, x 1414
- Celestine (Cellach) "MacLaureus", 1414–1428
- Robert Beaton, 1428–1430
- John Murray, fl. 1498
- John Gray, fl. 1543
- Hugh Curry, 1547–1551
- John Paterson, 1551

=== List of known commendators ===
- Thomas Malvil, 1556
- Patrick Murray, 1556
- John MacCorcadill, 1569–1583 x 1584
- Donald McVicar/MacPherson, 1583–1585 x 1607
