= James Dewar (disambiguation) =

James Dewar (1842–1923) was a Scottish chemist and physicist.

James Dewar may also refer to:

- James Dewar (musician) (1942–2002), Scottish bassist and vocalist
- James Dewar (baker) (1897–1985), Canadian inventor of the Twinkie snack cake
- James Dewar (judge) (1797–1830), British jurist and the Chief Justice of the Supreme Court of Bombay
- James Dewar (cricketer), English cricketer and British Army officer
- James Dewar (footballer), of Everton F.C. season 1892–93

== See also ==
- James Dewar Bourdillon, British civil servant
- Jim Dewar (disambiguation)
