= List of shipwrecks in June 1856 =

The list of shipwrecks in June 1856 includes ships sunk, foundered, grounded, or otherwise lost during June 1856.

== 1 June ==
List of shipwrecks: 1 June 1856
Ship	State	Description
Clementine	France	The ship ran aground off Dunkirk, Nord and was abandoned. She was on a voyage from Newcastle upon Tyne, Northumberland, United Kingdom to Marseille, Bouches-du-Rhône. Clementine was subsequently taken in to Antwerp, Belgium by a Belgian pilot boat.
Engelina Meinderdina	Netherlands	The ship was wrecked off Eierland, North Holland. Her crew were rescued. She was on a voyage from Newcastle upon Tyne to Groningen.
Margaret	United Kingdom	The ship ran aground off Rota, Spain and was damaged. She was on a voyage from Cádiz, Spain to Boston, Massachusetts, United States. She was refloated and put back to Cádiz, Spain, where she was beached.
Robert and Betsey	United Kingdom	The ship ran aground on the Whiting Sand, in The Wash. She was on a voyage from Seaham, County Durham to King's Lynn, Norfolk. She was refloated and beached. Subsequently refloated and taken in to King's Lynn in a sinking condition.
Union	United Kingdom	The ship ran aground on the Shipwash Sand, in the North Sea off the coast of Suffolk and was abandoned. Her crew were rescued. She was on a voyage from Seaham to London.

== 2 June ==
List of shipwrecks: 2 June 1856
Ship	State	Description
Amazon	United Kingdom	The ship was driven ashore on Castle Island, Bermuda. She was on a voyage from Gonaïves, Haiti to Falmouth, Cornwall.
Glenlyon	United Kingdom	The ship was driven ashore at Green Point, Province of Canada, British North America. She was on a voyage from Liverpool, Lancashire to Quebec City, Province of Canada.
William James	(United Kingdom of Great Britain and Ireland) New South Wales	The ship was wrecked at Sydney.

== 3 June ==
List of shipwrecks: 3 June 1856
Ship	State	Description
Nereus	United States	The ship was driven ashore at White Head. She was on a voyage from Málaga, Spain to Boston, Massachusetts. She was refloated the next day and found to be severely leaky.

== 4 June ==
List of shipwrecks: 4 June 1856
Ship	State	Description
Alma	United Kingdom	Lord Paget's yacht was run down and sunk in the English Channel off South Foreland, Kent by the steamship Diamant (Belgium). One of her crew got aboard Diamant, the rest reached Dover, Kent in the longboat. Alma was on a voyage from Colchester, Essex to the Isle of Wight.

== 7 June ==
List of shipwrecks: 7 June 1856
Ship	State	Description
Unicorn	United States	The full-rigged ship was abandoned in the Atlantic Ocean. Her crew were rescued by the barque Jane E. Walsh (United States). Unicorn was on a voyage from Liverpool, Lancashire, United Kingdom to Boston, Massachusetts.

== 8 June ==
List of shipwrecks: 8 June 1856
Ship	State	Description
Ben Avon	United Kingdom	The full-rigged ship was struck by lightning in the South China Sea ad set on fire. Her compass was damaged and she was consequently wrecked on 15 June 40 nautical miles (74 km) west of Amoy, China with the loss of five lives. Ben Avon was on a voyage from London to Shanghai, China.
Oxford	(United Kingdom of Great Britain and Ireland) British North America	The brig was in collision with the steamship Cataract ( (United Kingdom of Great Britain and Ireland) British North America and sank in Lake Erie with the loss of four lives.

== 9 June ==
List of shipwrecks: 9 June 1856
Ship	State	Description
Champion	United States	The ship capsized and sank in a squall in the Bay of Havana.
Comet	United Kingdom	The ship ran aground on the Scroby Sands, Norfolk. She was on a voyage from Sunderland, County Durham to Portsmouth, Hampshire.
Lady Franklin	United Kingdom	The ship was last sighted in the Mediterranean Sea on this day. Presumed subsequently foundered with the loss of all hands.
Mahmoody	(United Kingdom of Great Britain and Ireland) Straits Settlements	The ship was destroyed by fire at Madras, India. Her crew survived.
Mirzapore	United Kingdom	The barque ran aground and capsized at Liverpool, Lancashire. She was righted on 11 June.
Typhoon	United Kingdom	The ship was driven ashore on Bardsey Island, Pembrokeshire. She was on a voyage from Liverpool to Balaklava, Russia. She was refloated and put back to Liverpool.
Viking Haavaren	Norway	The schooner ran aground on the Longsand, in the North Sea off the coast of Essex, United Kingdom. She was on a voyage from Marseille, Bouches-du-Rhône, France to Ipswich, Suffolk, United Kingdom. She was refloated with assistance from the smack Phoenix (United Kingdom and taken in to Harwich, Essex.

== 10 June ==
List of shipwrecks: 10 June 1856
Ship	State	Description
HMS Belleisle	Royal Navy	The Repulse-class ship of the line ran aground on the Englishman's Shoal, at the entrance to the Bosphorus. She was refloated on 13 June.
Goldseeker	(United Kingdom of Great Britain and Ireland) New South Wales	The schooner was driven ashore and wrecked at Nobbys Head. She was on a voyage from Melbourne, Victoria to Sydney.
Hope	United Kingdom	The barque was driven ashore and wrecked at Galle, Ceylon.
Juliana	Bremen	The barque ran aground on the Goodwin Sands, Norfolk, United Kingdom. She was on a voyage from Puerto Rico to Hamburg. She was refloated.

== 11 June ==
List of shipwrecks: 11 June 1856
Ship	State	Description
Angelica	Austrian Empire	The ship was driven ashore at "Perestossi", Ottoman Empire. She was on a voyage from Galaţi, Ottoman Empire to a British port.
Hero	United Kingdom	The brig was sighted 30 nautical miles (56 km) off Jamaica whilst on a voyage from Kingston to Savannah-la-Mar, Jamaica. No further trace, presumed foundered with the loss of all hands
Three Brothers	United Kingdom	The ship was driven ashore and wrecked at Bexhill-on-Sea, Sussex.
RMS Wye	United Kingdom	The steamship was driven ashore on Guadeloupe. She was on a voyage from Saint Thomas, Virgin Islands to Demerara, British Guiana. RMS Wye was refloated with assistance from RMS Teviot (United Kingdom) and a French Navy warship.

== 12 June ==
List of shipwrecks: 12 June 1856
Ship	State	Description
Magnolia	United States	The steamboat was wrecked in the Ohio River 3 nautical miles (5.6 km) downstream of Louisville, Kentucky.

== 13 June ==
List of shipwrecks: 13 June 1856
Ship	State	Description
Juaniatta	Flag unknown	The ship ran aground on the Goodwin Sands, Kent, United Kingdom. She was refloated with the assistance of a tug and taken in to The Downs.

== 14 June ==
List of shipwrecks: 14 June 1856
Ship	State	Description
Acasta	United Kingdom	The ship ran aground on the Goodwin Sands, Kent and was damaged. She was refloated and put back to London for repairs.
Princess Charlotte	United Kingdom	The whaler was crushed by ice in Davis Strait. The crew was saved.
Savanna	United Kingdom	The ship ran aground on Naissaar, Russia. She was on a voyage from Blyth, Northumberland to Kronstadt, Russia. She was refloated and completed her journey, arriving on 17 June.

== 15 June ==
List of shipwrecks: 15 June 1856
Ship	State	Description
Illyria	United Kingdom	The ship sprang a leak and foundered in the North Sea 40 nautical miles (74 km) off Texel, North Holland, Netherlands. Her crew were rescued. She was on a voyage from Hamburg to Weymouth, Dorset.
Kate	United Kingdom	The ship caught fire and was abandoned in Mandela Bay, Greece. Her crew were rescued by a British steamship. She subsequently came ashore on Syros.
Mount Vernon	United States	The ship′s hull was stove in by ice and sank southwest of Iony Island in the western Sea of Okhotsk. The crew and most of the cargo of whale oil were saved by Barnstable (United States).

== 16 June ==
List of shipwrecks: 16 June 1856
Ship	State	Description
Ben Avon	United Kingdom	The ship was wrecked at Tee-haw Point, 30 nautical miles (56 km) north of Amoy, China with the loss of five lives. She was on a voyage from London to Shanghai, China.
Isabella Harnett	United Kingdom	The ship ran aground on the Gapsar Sand, in the Hooghly River. She was on a voyage from Liverpool, Lancashire to Calcutta, India. She was refloated and taken in to Calcutta in a severely leaky condition and placed under repair.
Woodman	United Kingdom	The ship was driven ashore in Aracaji Bay. She was on a voyage from Liverpool to Maranhão, Brazil. She was refloated and resumed her voyage, arriving on 1 July in a leaky condition.

== 17 June ==
List of shipwrecks: 17 June 1856
Ship	State	Description
Alice	United Kingdom	The steamship ran aground on the Sow and Pigs Rocks, off the coast of Northumberland. She was on a voyage from the River Tyne to Perth. She was refloated with the assistance of three tugs and resumed her voyage.
Electra	United Kingdom	The ship ran aground on the Huccoo Reef. She was refloated and taken in to Great Courland Bay, Tobago.
Harold	United Kingdom	The ship ran aground on the Fultah Sand, in the Hooghly River. She was on a voyage from Liverpool, Lancashire to Calcutta, India. She was refloated and towed in to Calcutta.

== 18 June ==
List of shipwrecks: 18 June 1856
Ship	State	Description
Columbia	United States	The brig was run into by the barque Victoria (United Kingdom) and sank in the Atlantic Ocean. Her crew were rescued by Victoria. Colombia was on a voyage from New York to Málaga, Spain.
Sophia	(United Kingdom of Great Britain and Ireland) British North America	The barque was in collision with Harvest Queen (United Kingdom) and was abandoned in the Atlantic Ocean. Her crew were rescued by Harvest Queen. Sophia was on a voyage from Trapani, Sicily to Boston, Massachusetts, United States.

== 19 June ==
List of shipwrecks: 19 June 1856
Ship	State	Description
Cherub	United Kingdom	The brig was driven ashore south of Ferryden, Forfarshire. She was later refloated and taken in to Montrose, Forfarshire for repairs.
Jane	United Kingdom	The brig was driven ashore at Sandgate, Kent.
Port of Maryport	United Kingdom	The ship was driven ashore at Millisle, County Down. She was refloated on 23 June and taken in to Belfast, County Antrim.
Vivid	United Kingdom	The ship was driven ashore in the River South Esk.

== 21 June ==
List of shipwrecks: 21 June 1856
Ship	State	Description
Damblet	France	The ship ran aground on the Flemish Banks, in the North Sea. She was on a voyage from Newcastle upon Tyne, Northumberland, United Kingdom to Goeree, Zeeland, Netherlands. She was refloated and put in to Deal, Kent, United Kingdom in a leaky condition.
Isabella	United Kingdom	The ship ran aground at Le Havre, Seine-Inférieure, France. She was on a voyage from Newcastle upon Tyne, Northumberland to Le Havre. She was refloated and taken in to port in a leaky condition.
Sheridan Knowles	United Kingdom	The ship sprang a leak and was abandoned 200 nautical miles (370 km) east of the Cape of Good Hope, Cape Colony. Her crew were rescued by Eastern State (United States). Sheridan Knowles was on a voyage from Akyab, Burma to Cork.

== 22 June ==
List of shipwrecks: 22 June 1856
Ship	State	Description
Gipsey Queen	United Kingdom	The ship ran aground on the Skagen Reef, in the Baltic Sea and was abandoned. Her crew were rescued by Cresswell (United Kingdom). Gipsey Queen was on a voyage from Newcastle upon Tyne, Northumberland to Kronstadt, Russia.
Nimrod	United Kingdom	The ship was driven ashore and wrecked at Berck, Pas-de-Calais, France. Her crew were rescued. She was on a voyage from Arklow, County Wicklow to Newcastle upon Tyne.
Walter	United Kingdom	The schooner was wrecked on the Newcombe Sand, in the North Sea off the coast of Suffolk. Her crew were rescued. She was on a voyage from Falmouth, Cornwall to Newcastle upon Tyne.

== 23 June ==
List of shipwrecks: 23 June 1856
Ship	State	Description
Agenoria	United Kingdom	The ship ran aground on The Shingles, of the Isle of Wight. She was on a voyage from London to Plymouth, Devon. She was refloated and put in to Cowes, Isle of Wight in a leaky condition.
Harriet	United Kingdom	The ship ran aground in the Ems. She was on a voyage from Hamburg to London. She was refloatedbut found to be severely leaky and put in to Delfzijl, Groningen, Netherlands for repairs.

== 24 June ==
List of shipwrecks: 24 June 1856
Ship	State	Description
Betsey Hall	United Kingdom	The ship ran aground off Algeciras, Spain. She was on a voyage from Barletta, Kingdom of the Two Sicilies to Gloucester. She was refloated the next day and resumed her voyage.
Emily	United Kingdom	The ship ran aground on the West Hoyle Bank, in Liverpool Bay. She was on a voyage from Liverpool, Lancashire to a French port. She was refloated and taken in to the River Dee.
Sunny South	(United Kingdom of Great Britain and Ireland) British North America	The ship was abandoned in the Indian Ocean. Twelve of her crew were rescued by Guiding Star (United Kingdom), the remainder by a Dutch vessel. Sunny South was on a voyage from Akyab, Burma to Falmouth, Cornwall.

== 25 June ==
List of shipwrecks: 25 June 1856
Ship	State	Description
Haabet	Norway	The ship was abandoned in the English Channel. Her crew were rescued by Ida Margaretta (Flag unknown).
Medora	United States	The ship was wrecked on Langlade Island, Saint Pierre and Miquelon. She was on a voyage from Quebec City, Province of Canada, British North America to London, United Kingdom.

== 27 June ==
List of shipwrecks: 27 June 1856
Ship	State	Description
Bentinck	United Kingdom	The barque ran aground at Point Shirley, Massachusetts, United States.
Larch	United Kingdom	The schooner struck the Stag Rocks, in the English Channel off The Lizard, Cornwall and foundered. Her crew were rescued. She was on a voyage from Port Talbot, Glamorgan to Plymouth, Devon.
Queen	United Kingdom	The barque was run into by the steamship Pamella (France) and sank off Tarifa, Spain. Her 14 crew were rescued by Pamella. Queen was on a voyage from Gibraltar to Rouen, Seine-Inférieure, France.
Wanderer	United Kingdom	The barque was driven ashore and wrecked at Ardmore Point, County Waterford. Her crew were rescued. She was on a voyage from Dublin to Memel, Prussia.

== 28 June ==
List of shipwrecks: 28 June 1856
Ship	State	Description
Hope	United Kingdom	The ship ran aground on the Goswick Sands, in the North Sea off the coast of Northumberland. She was refloated and put in to Lindisfarne, Northumberland.
Nora	United Kingdom	The ship ran aground on the Goodwin Sands, Kent. She was on a voyage from Seaham, County Durham to Southampton, Hampshire. She was refloated with assistance from a tug.

== 29 June ==
List of shipwrecks: 29 June 1856
Ship	State	Description
China	United Kingdom	The ship was wrecked on a reef 2 nautical miles (3.7 km) south of the southernmost of the Thousand Islands, Spanish East Indies. She was on a voyage from Manila, Spanish East Indies to London.
George Washington	United States	The brig was driven ashore Cape Henry, Virginia.
Santiago	United Kingdom	The steamship was driven ashore at Point Santa Maria, Peru. She was on a voyage from Callao, Peru to Valparaíso, Chile. She was refloated and put back to Callao.

== 30 June ==
List of shipwrecks: 30 June 1856
Ship	State	Description
Bonita	United Kingdom	The ship was driven ashore at Woosung, China. She was on a voyage from Cardiff, Glamorgan to Shanghai, China.
Clarendon	United Kingdom	The troopship sprang a leak in the Strait of Gibraltar and was beached at Cape Candor, Spain. Her 140 troops were taken off by the steamship Constance (France). Clarendon was refloated and towed by the steamship Everilde (Spain) to Puntales, Cádiz. HMS Banshee (Royal Navy) then towed her in to La Carraca shipyard, San Fernando, Spain.
Isabella	United Kingdom	The ship broke free from her anchor, collided with the barque Hoop (Netherlands) and was driven ashore at Narva, Russia.
Jane Robertson	United Kingdom	The schooner was driven ashore at Narva.
Lioness	United States	The schooner burned at Cambelton, Bay Chaleur.
Lord Lovat	United Kingdom	The ship was driven ashore wrecked at Narva.

== Unknown date ==
List of shipwrecks: Unknown date in June 1856
Ship	State	Description
Accord	United Kingdom	The ship was wrecked near Narva, Russia. Possibly the same vessel as Canova listed below.
Alfine	United Kingdom	The ship ran aground off the Pelican Spit, Ottoman Empire before 10 June. She was on a voyage from Troon, Ayrshire to Smyrna, Ottoman Empire. She was refloated and completed her voyage.
Amalia	Spain	The ship was abandoned in the Atlantic Ocean. There were at least eight survivors. She was on a voyage from Bilbao to Swansea, Glamorgan, United Kingdom.
Amity	United Kingdom	The ship was wrecked on a reef 30 nautical miles (56 km) off Saint Domingo. She was on a voyage from Cardiff, Glamorgan to Havana, Cuba.
Antelope	(United Kingdom of Great Britain and Ireland) New Zealand	The ship was wrecked off the Māhia Peninsula.
Attica	United States	The ship ran aground in Rocky Bay before 5 June. She was on a voyage from Boston, Massachusetts to Shediac, Nova Scotia, British North America. She was consequently condemned.
Augusta	United Kingdom	The ship sank in Lough Swilly. She was on a voyage from Callao, Peru to Queenstown, County Cork. She was refloated on 21 June and beached.
British Empire	United Kingdom	The ship was in collision with Fashion (United Kingdom) and sank in the Saint Lawrence River at Lachine, Province of Canada, British North America.
Canova	United Kingdom	The ship was driven ashore near "Witzhaken", Russia.
Chancer	United Kingdom	The ship was abandoned in the Pacific Ocean 500 nautical miles (930 km) off Coquimbo, Chile. Her crew were rescued. She was on a voyage from Caldera, Chile to Swansea.
Enterprise	United Kingdom	The ship ran aground off the Pelican Spit before 10 June. She was on a voyage from Liverpool, Lancashire to Smyrna. She was refloated and completed her voyage.
Gazelle	(United Kingdom of Great Britain and Ireland) New South Wales	The ship was wrecked on Woodlake Island. Her crew were murdered by the local inhabitants. She was on a voyage from Sydney to Woodlake Island.
Georgina	United Kingdom	The ship was abandoned in the Atlantic Ocean before 7 June. She was on a voyage from Livorno, Grand Duchy of Tuscany to London.
Harold	United Kingdom	The ship ran aground on the Fultah Sand before 17 June. She was on a voyage from Liverpool to Calcutta, India.
Kalahdin	United States	The full-rigged ship was driven ashore on Long Key, Florida before 21 June and was abandoned. She was on a voyage from New Orleans, Louisiana to Vigo, Spain.
Meg Mirrilees	(United Kingdom of Great Britain and Ireland) New South Wales	The schooner was wrecked at Corner Inlet. Four people were reported missing.
Nimrod	United Kingdom	The ship was driven ashore and wrecked at Étaples, Pas-de-Calais, France before 23 June. She was on a voyage from Arklow, County Wicklow to Newcastle upon Tyne, Northumberland.
Nanna	Norway	The ship was wrecked in the Saugenay River. Her crew were rescued.
Nora	United Kingdom	The ship caught fire and put in to Stornoway, Orkney Islands. She was on a voyage from Liverpool to Kronstadt, Russia. She was place under repair at Stornoway.
Pacific	United Kingdom	The schooner was lost in the Strait of Belle Isle before 30 June with the loss of her Captain.
Pilgrim	United Kingdom	The ship was driven ashore on Brier Island, Nova Scotia, British North America. She was later refloated and towed in to Saint John, New Brunswick, British North America, where she arrived on 12 June in a leaky condition.
St. Martin	(United Kingdom of Great Britain and Ireland) New Zealand	The ship was wrecked off the Māhia Peninsula.
Tarquina	United States	The whaler, a brig, was sunk by ice in or near Shantar Bay. Her crew were rescued.
Typhoon	United Kingdom	The ship was driven ashore on Bardsey Island, Caernarfonshire. She was on a voyage from Liverpool to Balaklava, Russia. She was refloated and put back to Liverpool in a leaky condition.
Victory	United Kingdom	The ship foundered in the Atlantic Ocean (49°12′N 7°25′W on or before 2 June.
