= George Dewar =

George Dewar may refer to:

- George Dewar (Canadian politician) (1915–2003), Canadian physician and politician in Prince Edward Island
- George Dewar (Australian politician) (1868–1953), New South Wales politician
- George E. Dewar (1895–1969), New Zealand poet, writer, teacher, farmer, worker and First World War soldier
- George F. Dewar (1865–1961), physician and political figure in Prince Edward Island, Canada
- Geordie Dewar (George Dewar, 1867–1915), Scottish footballer
