= Deewaar (disambiguation) =

Deewaar (transl. The Wall) is a 1975 Indian Hindi-language film directed by Yash Chopra and starring Amitabh Bachchan and Shashi Kapoor.

Deewaar or Deewar may also refer to:

- Deewaar: Let's Bring Our Heroes Home, a 2004 Indian film, also starring Bachchan
- Deewar (TV series), an Indian television show on TV Asia

== See also ==
- Dewar (disambiguation)
