= St. Fillan's Crozier =

8th century Insular crozier crook

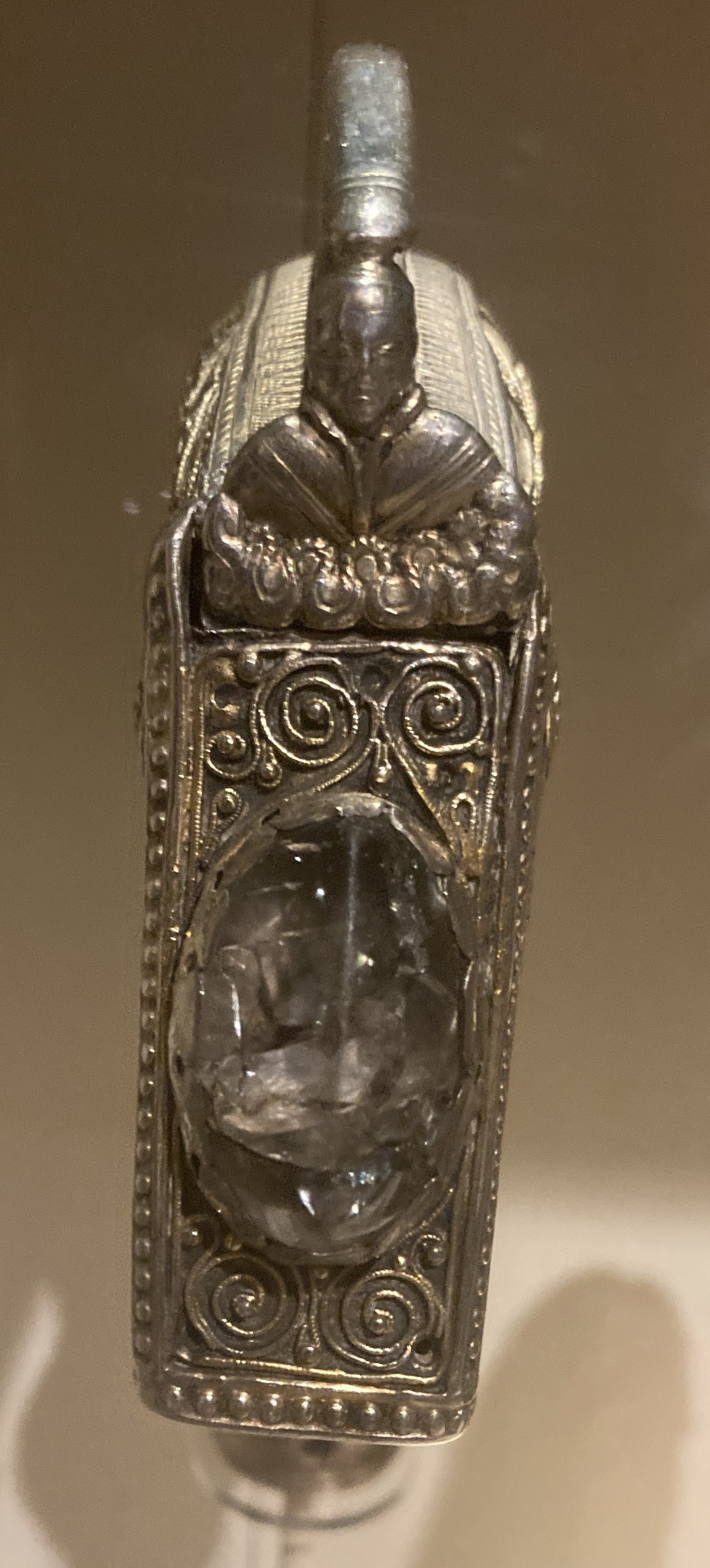
- The drop-plate of the Crozier of St Fillan
- Size: length: 23.5 cm (9.3 in), width: 20.0 cm (7.9 in)
- Created: 8th century Added to in the 11th century
- Discovered: mid-19th century
- Present location: National Museum of Scotland, Edinburgh
- Registration: H.KC 1

St. Fillan's Crozier is an 8th century Insular crozier crook (or head) traditionally associated with the Irish monk St. Fillan (Gaelic: Fáelán; "little wolf"), who lived in the eighth century at Glendochart in Perthshire, central Scotland. Only the crook survives; the staff was lost at an unknown date. Sometime around the late 13th century it was encased in the Coigreach (or Quigrich), a crosier-shrine of similar size and form built as a protective case, made from silver, gold and rock crystal and dating from the late 13th century, with additions c. the 14th or 15th centuries. The Coigreach was rediscovered in the mid-19th century by the archaeologist Daniel Wilson, who opened it and found St. Fillan's Crozier inside.

Records show that the original wooden crozier (Scottish Gaelic: Baculus) was used for blessings and as a talisman or battle standard: it is recorded as having been brought onto the field at the Battle of Bannockburn in 1314. It was later thought to be able to heal people and animals, and under the ownership of the Dewars of Glendochart—its hereditary keepers until the mid-18th century—acted as a ceremonial object for oaths of loyalty and dispute settlement, mostly related to the recovery of stolen cattle.

Both St. Fillan's Crozier (catalogue nr H.KC 1) and the Coigreach (H.KC 2) are in the collection of the National Museum of Scotland in Edinburgh, where they are displayed in the Kingdom of the Scots gallery, and are described by the museum as an "object-pair".

== Description ==
The crozier head is designed in the West Highland style, and like all contemporary Insular croziers formed from a wooden core lined with bronze plates, which are decorated with niello, lead sulphide, copper and silver. It is thought to date from c. 800 AD and was reworked in the 11th century. It was found inside the late-14th or 15th century Coigreach (or "Coigrich", sometimes spelt "Quigrich"), an ornamented crosier-shrine built as a protective case to hold what was left of the earlier object.

The Coigreach is made from a bronze base lined with a series of plaques decorated with raised bands of engraved metal ornamented with niello. Some of the bands have silver gilt and filigree; a number of these elements were removed from the crosier and transferred onto the Coigreach.

The head is 23.5 cm (9.3 in) in height and 20.0 cm (7.9 in) long. The rest of the crozier (i.e. its staff) is lost.

== Provenance ==
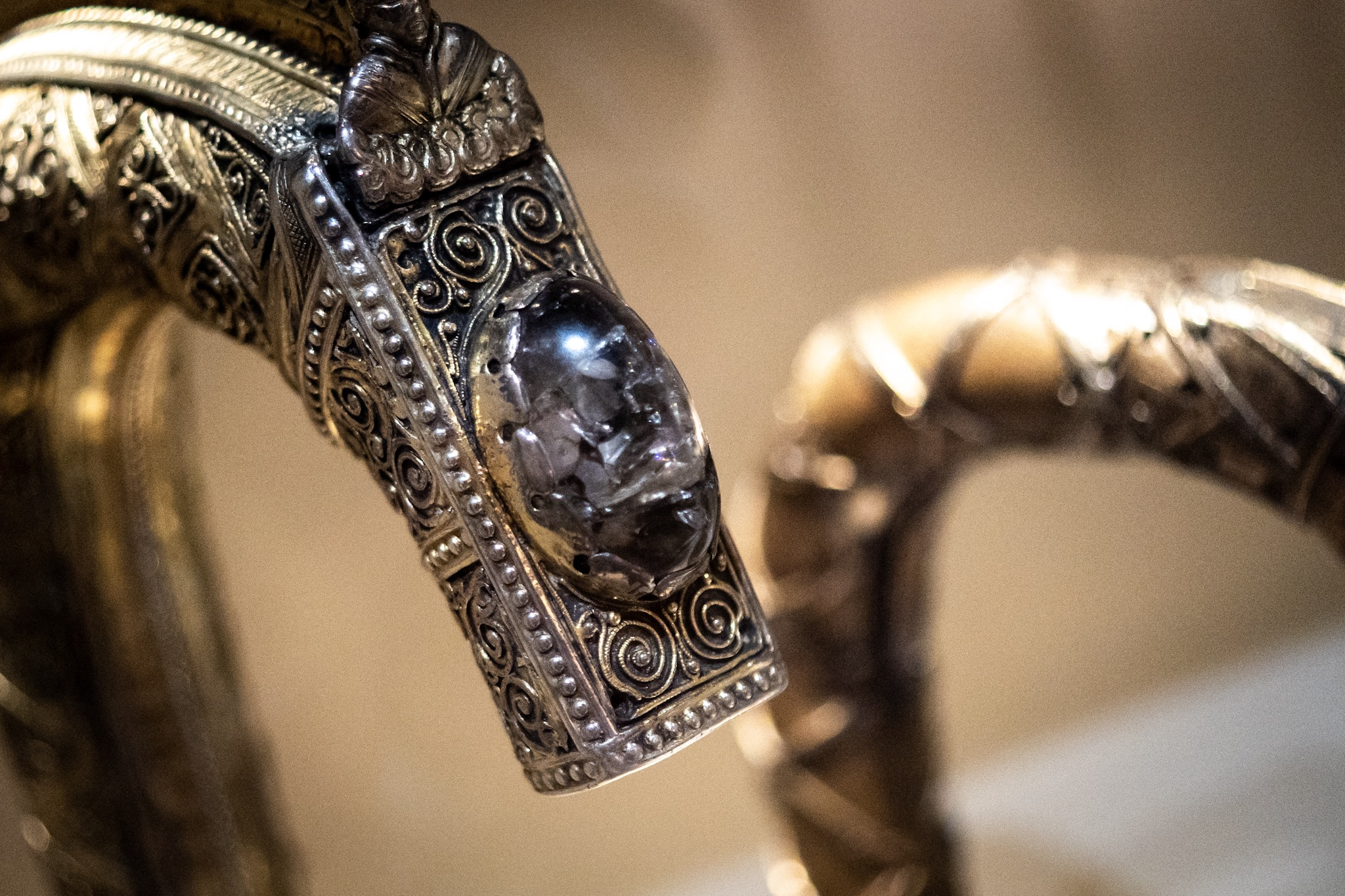
St Fillan's drop-plate, with the Coigreach to the right.

Fillan travelled from Ireland to Strath Fillan, central Scotland, in 730AD, apparently to Christianize the Picts. He founded a prior at Glendochart, and became greatly venerated in the region and eventually became a national saint. At his death, Fillan bequeathed his relics to laymen in Glendochart rather than the priory monks. These relics included his bell (or bernane), and a lost arm relic today known as the Shrine of St. Fillan's Hand, which for a period was mistakenly identified as the 14th-century object now known as Shrine of Saint Patrick's Hand.

Sometime around the 13th or 14th century the crozier was enshrined within the Coigreach. It then fell into the possession of the Dewar (sometimes spelled "Deoir" or "Jore") family sometime around 1400. They became its hereditary keepers and passed it from father to son for five centuries. Ownership of the crozier entitled its possessor to ownership of lands and the right to tax local sales of grain; effectively retaining its original function as a staff of office and sign of authority. The Coigreach was kept at the family home at Eyich, outside Crianlarich, Perthshire.

In 1819 Archibald Dewar (d. 1831) emigrated to Ontario in Canada and took the Coigreach with him. According to the National Museum of Scotland, while there and "as had been the custom in Scotland, the Coigreach was used to bless the drinking water of cattle of Scottish emigrants". Soon afterwards the antiquarian and archaeologist Daniel Wilson realised its value and arranged for its return to Scotland, under the ownership of the Wuigrich to the Society of Antiquaries for the National Museum of Scotland. Shortly after this rediscovery, the Coigreach was opened and found to contain the much earlier crozier.

== Gallery ==
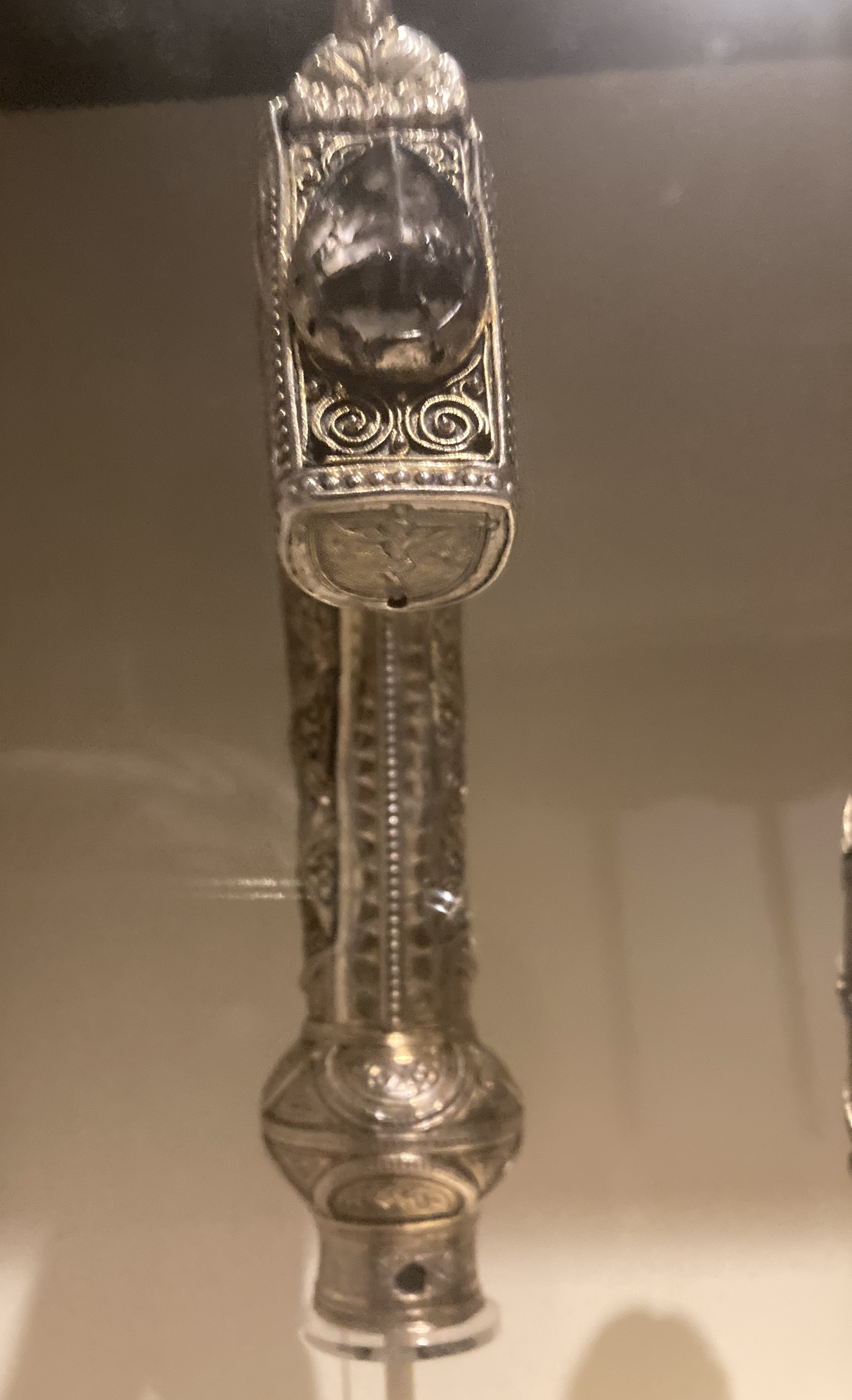
Full view St. Fillan’s Crozier

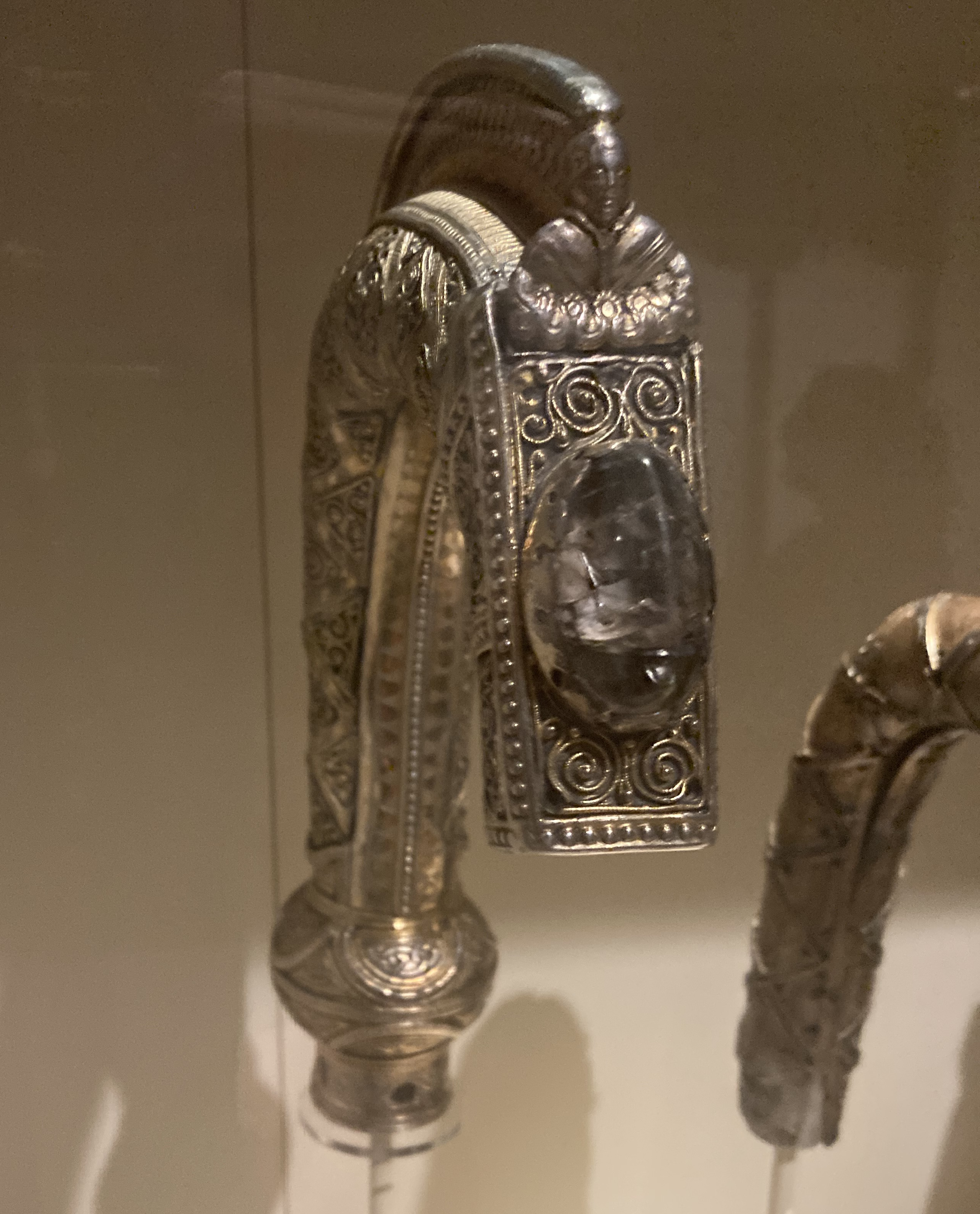
St. Fillan’s Crozier, with the Coigreach to the right

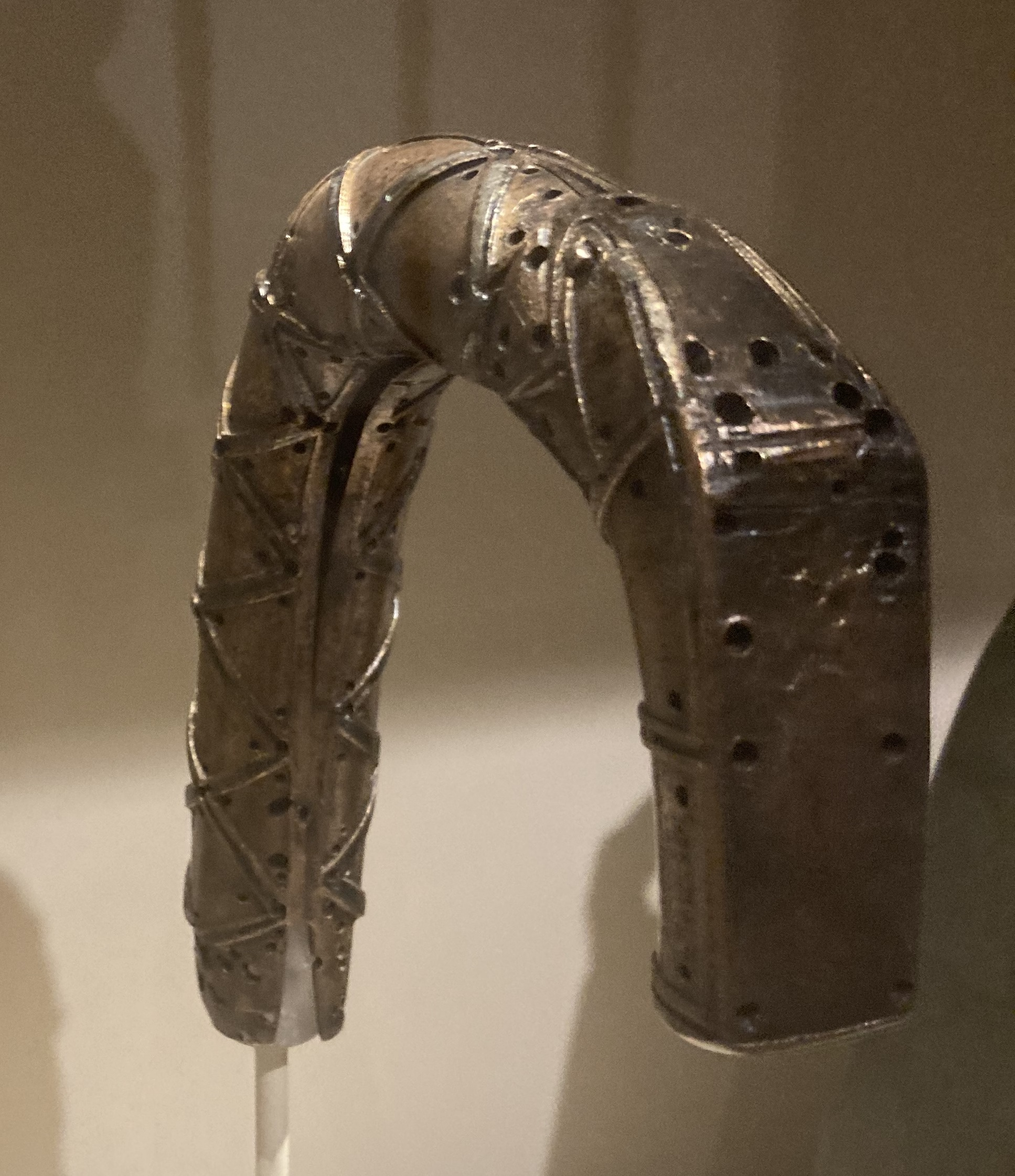
The Coigreach
