= Clan Dewar =

Scottish clan

- Deòireach, Mac an Deòir
- Motto: Quid non pro Patria? (Latin) "Why would we not do it for our Country?"

Chief
- Michael Kenneth O’Malley Dewar of that Ilk And Vogrie
- Chief of Clan Dewar
Septs of Clan Dewar
Dewar, Deware, Dewe, Dew, Dure, Due, Dewyer, Dewer, McIndeor, McJarrow
Clan branches
Dewars of that Ilk And Vogrie (chiefs)
Dewar Coigerachs (Highlanders)
Dewars of Cambuskenneth
Dewars of Dupplin
Dewar (Dewar na Ferg) of Perthshire

Clan Dewar is a Scottish clan.

== History ==
=== Origins of the clan ===
==== Traditional origins ====
As with many Scottish clans a legend exists to demonstrate physical prowess. There is a tradition that a savage wolf was terrorising the district around Heriot and a reward was offered to the man who would despatch the beast. Dewar is said to have achieved this and received his bounty. However it is not known if the lands of Dewar are named after the surname or if the surname is taken from the lands.

==== Recorded origins ====
The earliest record of an organised family by the name of Dewar is in the Ragman Rolls of 1296, where Thomas and Piers de Deware appear swearing fealty to Edward I of England.

Lord Borthwick granted a charter for the lands of Dewar to William Dewar in 1474. This Dewar family were known as of that Ilk and rose to prominence, appearing in various charters in the sixteenth and seventeenth centuries. William Dewar sold the lands of Dewar and moved to Carrington that was nearby. From this William Dewar descend the chiefly line of Clan Dewar.

=== Wars of Scottish Independence ===
A derivation of the name in Scottish Gaelic is Deoradh which means pilgrim. The most distinguished of five Highland families by the name Dewar were the Dewar Coigerachs who were custodians of the Staff of St Fillan. The staff was carried at the Battle of Bannockburn in support of Robert the Bruce in 1314. The priceless artefact of the early Celtic church is now held in the National Museum of Scotland in Edinburgh.

=== 17th and 18th centuries ===
A branch of the Clan Dewar, the Dewars of Cambuskenneth were established by at least the 17th century, although Dewars are recorded in nearby Stirling, which was a Royal Burgh, from as early as 1483. John Dewar, son of Patrick Dewar of Cambuskenneth was fined £50 in 1710 for causing blood and riot.

The chiefly line of the Clan Dewar, the Dewars of that Ilk, became successful merchants and in 1719 purchased the barony and estate of Vogrie near Gorebridge. The representation of this family had passed to James Dewar who was a nephew of William Dewar of that Ilk.

=== 19th and 20th centuries ===
The Vogrie estates were a hive of industry, and a flourishing coal mine was sited there in the mid-19th century, as well as Scotland's first gunpowder mill. The fifth Laird of Vogrie lived in India where he was a High Court Judge. He died in 1869 and was succeeded by his brother, Alexander Dewar, sixth of Vogrie who served in the Bengal cavalry. The mansion house of Vogrie was built by Alexander, sixth Laird, although the estate has shrunk from 2,000 to around 250 acres (1.0 km^{2}).

Kenneth Dewar was an aide to George V and commanded HMS Royal Oak (08). It is from this Kenneth Dewar that the present chiefs of Clan Dewar are descended from.

The Dewar family whisky business was transformed into a major Scottish company by John Dewar who was created Baron Forteviot of Dupplin in 1917. This Dewar family's seat was at Dupplin Castle which was built between 1828 and 1832, and is one of the grandest houses in Scotland.

== Clan chief ==
The father of the present chief of Clan Dewar, Peter Dewar of that Ilk & Vogrie, was recognised by the Lord Lyon in 1990 thus allowing the Clan to be recognised as an official Scottish clan with chief rather than an Armigerous clan without a chief. The present chief is Peter Dewar of That Ilk And Vogrie. his heir, Roderick Thomas George Dewar, will take over, after the death of, Peter Dewar.

== As a sept of other clans ==
The surname Dewar is also regarded as a sept of the Clan Menzies, Clan Buchanan, Clan Arthur and Clan Macnab.

== See also ==
- Scottish clan
- Armigerous clan
- Dewar (Dewar na Ferg) of Perthshire
