= Deuchar =

Deuchar is a surname. Notable people with the surname include:

- Alex Deuchar (born 1988), English cricketer
- Alexander Deuchar (1777–1844), Scottish seal engraver
- Jimmy Deuchar (1930–1993), Scottish jazz trumpeter and big band arranger
- Kenny Deuchar (born 1980), Scottish footballer
- Stephen Deuchar (born 1957), British arts administrator

== Given name ==
- Deuchar Gordon (1871–1951), Australian pastoralist

== See also ==
- Deuchars (surname)
