= Jim Dewar =

Jim Dewar may refer to:

- James Dewar (musician) (1942–2002), Scottish musician
- Jim Dewar (American football) (1922–1989), American football halfback

== See also ==
- James Dewar (disambiguation)
