= Dewar Nunatak =

Nunatak in Graham Land, Antarctica

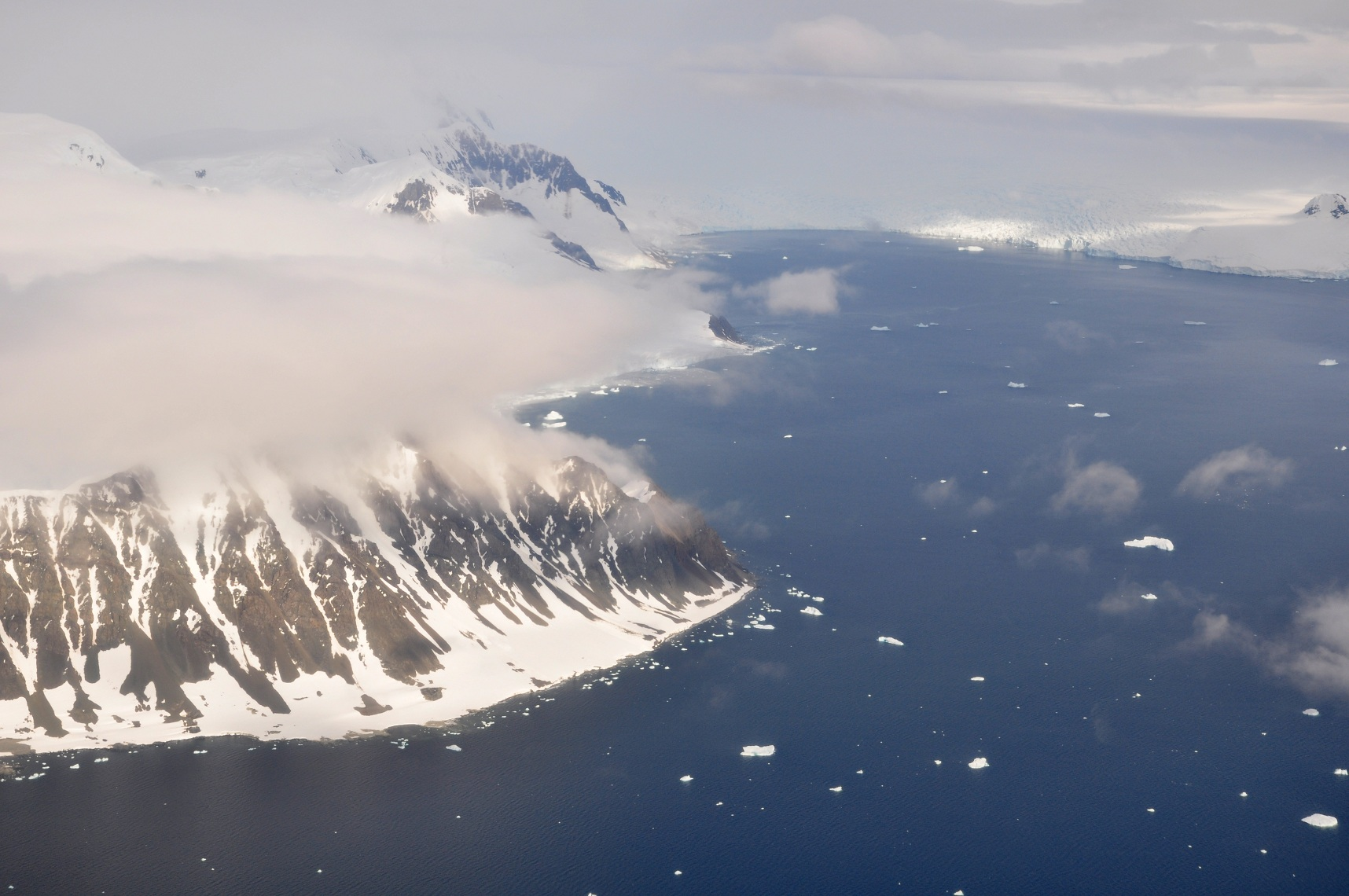
In this aerial picture of a part of Adelaide Island's east coast Dewar Nunatak is the lone mountain at the picture's extreme upper right hand edge. Click on the picture for a detailed description of the other geographical features.

Dewar Nunatak (67°20′S 68°15′W) is a mainly snow-covered nunatak rising to 520 metres (1,700 ft) in the middle of Shambles Glacier, on the east coast of Adelaide Island. It was named by the UK Antarctic Place-Names Committee in 1963 for Graham J.A. Dewar, a British Antarctic Survey geologist at Adelaide station, 1961–63.
