= James Dewar (judge) =

British jurist and chief justice (1797–1830)

James Dewar (1797 – 25 November 1830) was a British jurist and a chief justice of the Supreme Court of Bombay in British India.

== Early life ==
Dewar was born in Leuchars, Fife. He was the son of Major General David Dewar and Mary Cutler. Dewar was admitted to Middle Temple in 1821 and entitled to practice as a barrister. He married Clementine Wemyss, daughter of William Wemyss, in 1826. He lived at Cuttle Hill, Scotland.

== Career ==
Dewar initially practised in England before moving to British India in June 1827. He was appointed as clerk of the Crown and thereafter started practice in Bombay. He was elevated in the post of the Chief Justice of the Supreme Court Judicature of Bombay Presidency on 11 September 1829. He was Knighted in 1829. Dewar died on 25 November 1830 at the early age of thirty three. His son was the cricketer and British Army officer James Dewar, Jr.
