= James Dewar (cricketer) =

English cricketer and British Army officer

Personal information
- Full name: James William Dewar
- Born: 9 September 1827; Bombay, Bombay Presidency, British India
- Died: 19 July 1861 (aged 33); Middleton Stoney, Oxfordshire, England
- Batting: Unknown
- Bowling: Unknown

Career statistics
Competition	First-class
Matches	1
Runs scored	0
Batting average	0.00
100s/50s	–/–
Top score	0
Balls bowled	92
Wickets	0
Bowling average	–
5 wickets in innings	–
10 wickets in match	–
Best bowling	–
Catches/stumpings	1/–
- Source: ESPNcricinfo, 8 August 2019

James William Dewar (9 September 1827 – 19 July 1861) was an English first-class cricketer and British Army officer.

The son of Sir James Dewar and his wife, Clementine Wemyss, he was born in British India at Bombay in September 1827. He was educated in England at Winchester College. After leaving Winchester, Dewar purchased a commission as an ensign in the 49th Regiment of Foot in 1846. He purchased the rank of lieutenant in April 1850, with Dewar marrying Kate Jane Dayrell in November of the same year. He served in the British Army in the Crimean War, during which he was present for the Battle of the Alma, the Battle of Inkerman and the Siege of Sevastopol. In the second year of the war, he was promoted to the rank of captain. Following the end of his first marriage, he married Benares Anna de Stieger in November 1855. Dewar made a single appearance in first-class cricket for the Gentlemen of England against the Gentlemen of Surrey and Sussex at Lord's in July 1856. Batting once in the match, Dewar was dismissed without scoring in the Gentlemen of England first-innings by Frederick Oliver, while with the ball he bowled 23 wicketless overs, conceding 44 runs. He was decorated by the Ottoman Empire with the Order of the Medjidie, 5th Class in August 1856, while the following year he was decorated by France with the Legion of Honour. He was promoted to the rank of major from brevet major in March 1858. He died in July 1861 at Middleton Stoney, Oxfordshire.
