= George E. Dewar =

New Zealand writer, teacher, farmer and WWI soldier

George E. (Edward) Dewar (8 June 1891 – 8 December 1969) was a New Zealand poet, writer, teacher, farmer, worker and First World War soldier. Best remembered for his 1953 autobiographical book Chaslands about the early pioneering days there, he also wrote poetry on sport and his experiences as a First World War soldier and contributed widely to newspapers.

== Life ==
George Dewar was born in Christchurch on 8 June 1891. He was the son of Thomas Dewar, a state farmer and labourer, and Elizabeth Dewar; both were natives of Scotland.

His birth was registered as George Edward Smith, fourth child of David Smith and Elizabeth Smith. This is because his father (Thomas Dewar) had married his mother in Scotland using the fictitious name David Smith and the couple had departed soon after the marriage to New Zealand. The family subsequently resumed the real name of Dewar

Early in his life, he moved to Chaslands in the Owaka district of the South Island, where he grew up. An early mention of George appears in the Otago Witness newspaper delivering an epilogue at the conclusion of a school concert.

Chaslands was a small town with around 150 people in the 1900s. There was milling and a cheese factory. The local school opened in 1895 with two teachers. Living conditions were poor and difficult for the sick or injured. David McGill notes these facts in his Ghost Towns of New Zealand (1980) and notes further: ‘The isolated region grew intrepid men like George Dewar’s brother, Tom, who crossed the Andes on foot.’

At Chaslands, Dewar worked at various jobs, including bush work; sawmill work; and railway line construction. His military call up was in 1916 while he was working on a farm in Tuatapere (New Zealand Gazette, 23 November 1916, No. 132, p. 3682).

During the First World War, he served overseas in the NZEF along with his brother David. David was killed in France on 1 October 1918. George's embarkation unit was 23rd Reinforcements Otago Infantry Regiment, D Company. He served with C Company, 3rd Battalion, New Zealand Rifle Brigade. Wounded in action, Dewar spent time interned in a German Prisoner of War camp.

Repatriated after the Armistice, Dewar returned to the South Island to take further education through correspondence in Dunedin and Alexandra towards his Teacher's Certificate, following which he worked as a sole charge teacher and a head teacher at primary schools including Lower Harbour School (Deborah Bay, Otago), Hamama School, (Nelson), Owaka Valley School (South Otago), and Ratanui School (Otago) from 1921–1936.

Dewar married Matilda Dewar (née McGimpsey) on 11 May 1932 and the couple had three sons: Robert Dewar, David Dewar and Allan Dewar.

In 1937, he took up small farming at Clinton before moving to Waimate in 1943. Dewar worked as a rabbiter and did farm work in the Waimate district. He was known as a keen Toc H worker and studied nature.

During World War II, Dewar was appointed Lieutenant, Home Guard (New Zealand Gazette, 18 June 1942, No. 60, p. 1633).

Dewar was interested in sports like cricket and rugby and was an expert on bird-life. As a young man, Dewar played rugby for the Chaslands football team. He was also interested in the formation of the Catlins Historical Society and wrote giving recollections of visits to Cathedral Caves and Waipati Beach.

Dewar died in Waimate where he spent his retirement years on 8 December 1969. He was 78 years old; however, library catalogues give his birth date as 1895.

A number of obituaries for Dewar appeared after his death in the Clutha Leader, Waimate Daily Advertiser, Timaru Herald and Christchurch Star.

These obituaries give his birth date as 1891. The NZ Biographies Index at the National Library of New Zealand also notes him. Who's Who in New Zealand (1964) gives his birth date as 8 June 1895.

== Literary output ==
Dewar was known as a prodigious contributor of articles to newspapers, including the Waimate Daily Advertiser, had stories in New Zealand Outdoors magazine, and also wrote many poems, most relating to bird-life.

During the First World War, he wrote on his experiences in verse. The Hocken Collections in Dunedin, New Zealand holds the Dewar family papers relating to World War I.

Dewar published only two books in his lifetime: Song of the Lowburn Punt and Other Verses (1944) and Chaslands (1953). Chaslands is an autobiographical account of his early pioneering days there. It also includes stories of gold mining on the beaches.

David McGill writes: ‘George Dewar has written the Chaslands’ story from its heyday, in the 1890s to its lowdays in the 1950s – stories of lobster feasts, of eel for breakfast, dinner and tea, of mud up to your neck, the awesome chopping of the Browdens and Jack Churchfield, and the midwife Mrs Churchfield, who always knew the sex and time of birth, something medical science has not yet bettered.’

Noel Hoggard’s Handcraft Press in Wellington printed Dewar's 16-poem collection (a 26-page booklet); however, it is not in obituaries for Dewar. Hoggard also produced the literary magazine Arena.

A publisher's note describes The Song of the Lowburn Punt as 'a token of remembrance' for Dewar's time spent teaching in Otago and Nelson districts. The poems are a mixture of popular lyrics and ballads of those areas, including simple celebrations of bird-life (the bellbirds at Chaslands), and places such as the Otago hills, Waipouri and Hamama.

In 1976–77, Dewar's wife Matilda Dewar contributed George's material and her own to Radio New Zealand's's Wartime Stories concerning World War I. The Broadcasting Corporation of New Zealand donated their contributions in 1985 to the Alexander Turnbull Library, Wellington, New Zealand.

In 2010, Dewar's poem 'The Cricket Pitch' about the making of a pitch in a small Otago town (c.1919–1920) was included in Mark Pirie's's anthology A Tingling Catch: A Century of New Zealand Cricket Poems 1864–2009. Pirie found the poem in a 1972 issue of the magazine, New Zealand Cricketer. A researcher, G. J. Griffiths, had sent in Dewar’s poem. Griffiths found it in the Hocken Library.

== Publications by George E. Dewar ==
- The Cricket Pitch, Bliss Pamphlets (Hocken Library), c.1920
- Song of the Lowburn Punt and Other Verses, Wellington: The Handcraft Press, 1944
- Chaslands: Pioneering Days in Southern New Zealand, Wellington: Reed, 1953
