= Strath Fillan =

Strath in west Perthshire, Scotland

Coordinates: 56°25′0″N 4°39′48″W

Strath Fillan (Scottish Gaelic: Na Sraithibh) is a strath in west Perthshire named after an 8th-century Irish hermit monk, later canonised as Saint Fillan. Located in the region was once Strath Fillan Priory, an early 14th century foundation, later destroyed by the Campbells in the name of Calvinism.

The Strath stretches from Bridge of Orchy (NN300395) to Crianlarich (NN383248), a distance of 11 miles (18 km), and has long been a major route through the highlands; the A82 road, the West Highland Line, and the West Highland Way long-distance footpath all follow the strath.

The Strathfillan Community Development Trust was formed in 1997. It provides low cost rental housing for local residents and manages amenity woodland.
