= Fillan =

Two Scottish saints

Saint Fillan, Filan, Phillan, Fáelán (Old Irish) or Faolán (modern Irish and Scottish Gaelic) is the name of an eighth century monk from Munster, who having studied at Taghmon Abbey, traveled to Scotland and settled at Strath Fillan.

== Name ==
The name Fillan probably means "little wolf" in Irish, being formed on a diminutive of faol, an old word for the animal. In Irish the name Faolán is pronounced 'Fway-lawn'.

== Life ==
St. Fillan of Munster, the son of Feriach, grandson of Cellach Cualann, King of Leinster, received the monastic habit at the Abbey of Fintán of Taghmon in Wexford and came to Scotland from Ireland in 717 as a hermit along with his Irish princess-mother St. Kentigerna, and his Irish prince-uncle St. Comgan. They settled at Loch Duich.

After spending some time with his uncle Saint Comgan at Lochalsh, where Killilan (Kilfillan) bears his name, the saint devoted himself to the evangelization of the district of Perthshire round Strath Fillan, which is called after him, and where he was greatly venerated. St. Fillan was the abbot of a monastery in Fife before retiring to Glen Dochart and Strathfillan near Tyndrum in Perthshire.

== Legends ==
A story is told that while St. Fillan was ploughing the fields near Killin, a wolf took the life of the ox and thus Fillan could not continue. A geis was put on the ox, which meant the wolf had to take the place of the ox and do its work. The story may be considered more of a parable than historical truth, but the connection with the origins of Fillan's name remains obvious.

St. Fillan was credited with powers such as the healing of the sick and also possessed a luminous glow from his left arm which he used to study and copy Sacred Scripture in the dark.

== St. Fillan's Priory ==
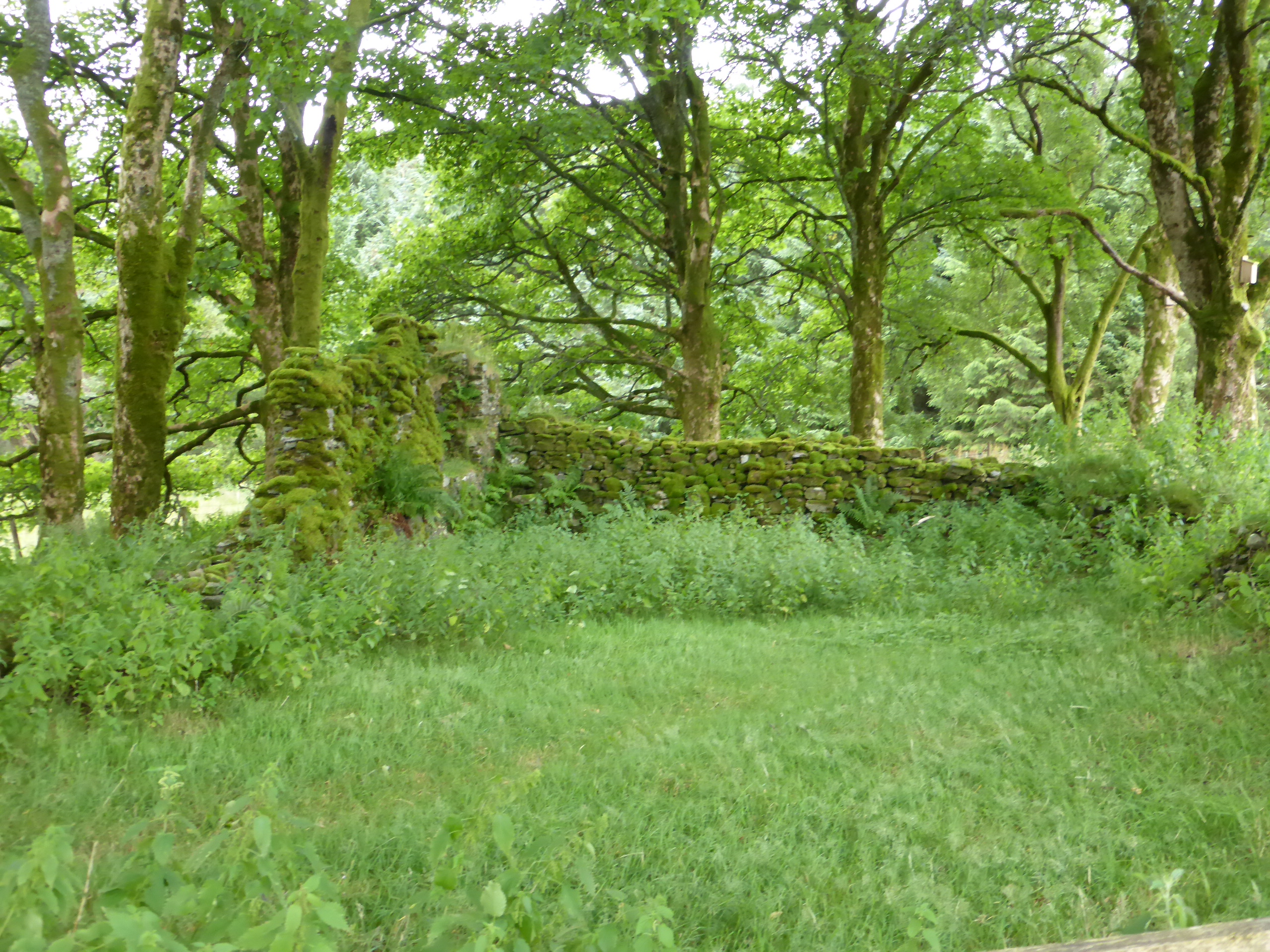
St. Fillans Priory

At an Augustinian priory at Kirkton Farm along to the West Highland Way, the priory's lay abbot, who was its superior in the reign of William the Lion, held high rank in the Scottish kingdom. This monastery was restored in the reign of Robert I of Scotland (Robert the Bruce), and became a cell of the abbey of canons regular at Inchaffray Abbey. The new foundation received a grant from King Robert, in gratitude for the aid which he was supposed to have obtained from a relic of the saint (an arm-bone) on the eve of the great victory over King Edward II's army at the Battle of Bannockburn. The saint's original chapel was up river, slightly northwest of the abbey and adjacent to a deep body of water which became known as St. Fillan's Pool.

== Relics ==
The Mayne was an arm bone, now lost, enclosed in a silver reliquary or casket. The success of the Scots at Bannockburn was attributed to the presence of the arm of Saint Fillan, which was borne by its custodian, the Abbot of Inchaffray, on the field of battle. Legend has it that King Robert the Bruce requested the bone be brought to the Bannockburn battle site. The deoir, hereditary keeper of the relic, and the Abbot of Inchaffray Abbey left the bone behind and brought only the reliquary because they didn't want the relic to fall into English possession. On the eve of the Bannockburn battle, as the deoir, the abbot and Robert knelt in prayer, a noise came from the reliquary. They looked at the reliquary as the door opened and the bone fell to the floor. The Bruce won the battle the next day and established a monastery to thank St. Fillan for the victory.

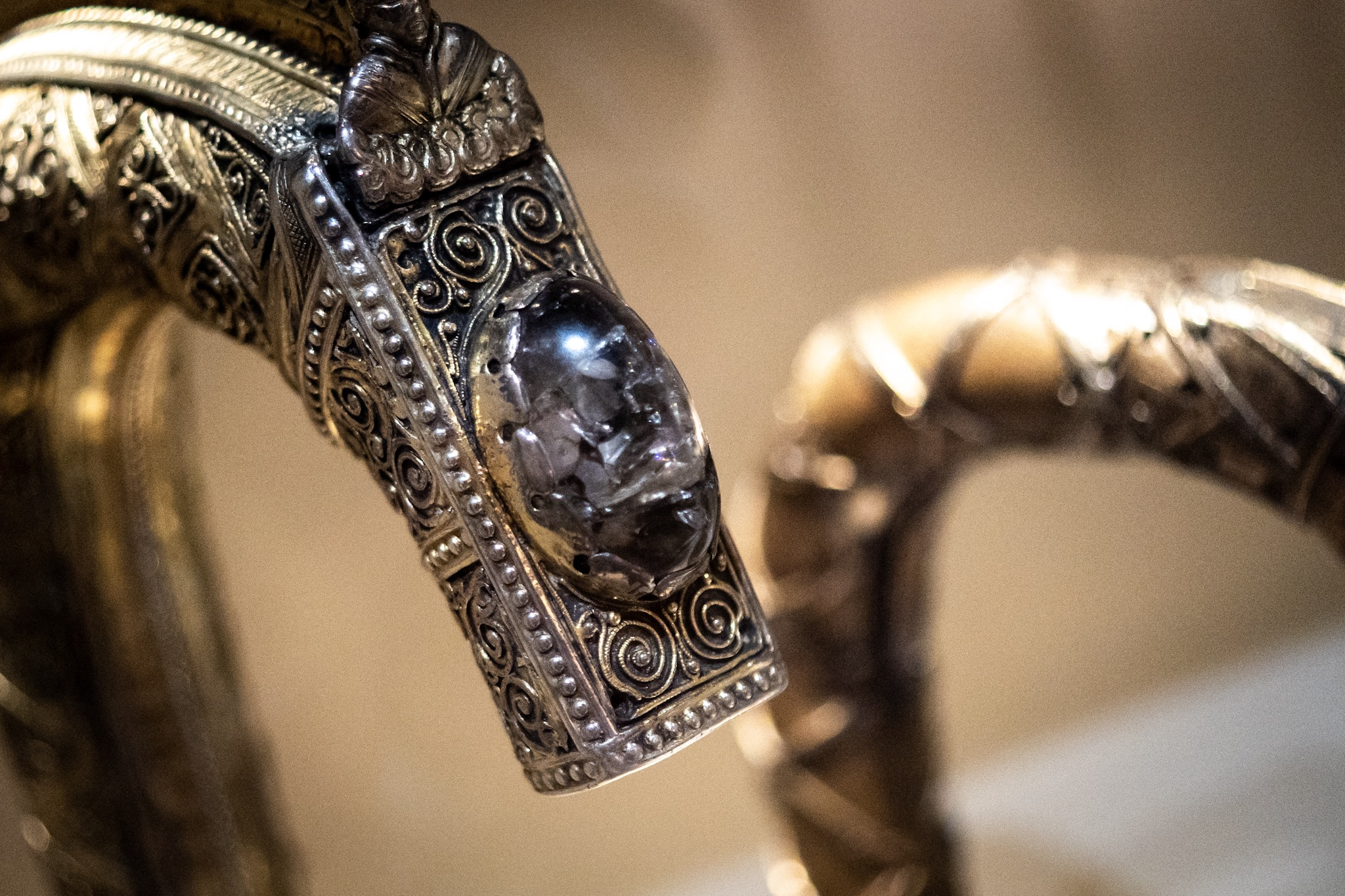
St Fillan's drop-plate, with the Coigreach to the right.

The Quigrich, or saint's staff, crosier, also known as the Coygerach, is one of the sacred battle-ensigns of Scotland and said to have been present at Bannockburn. It was long in the possession of a family of the name of Jore and/or Dewar (from the Gaelic deoir), who were its hereditary guardians in the Middle Ages. The Dewars, or deoiradh, certainly had it in their custody during 1428, and their right was formally recognised by King James III in 1487. The head of the crosier, which is of silver-gilt with a smaller one of bronze enclosed within it, is in the National Museum of Scotland.

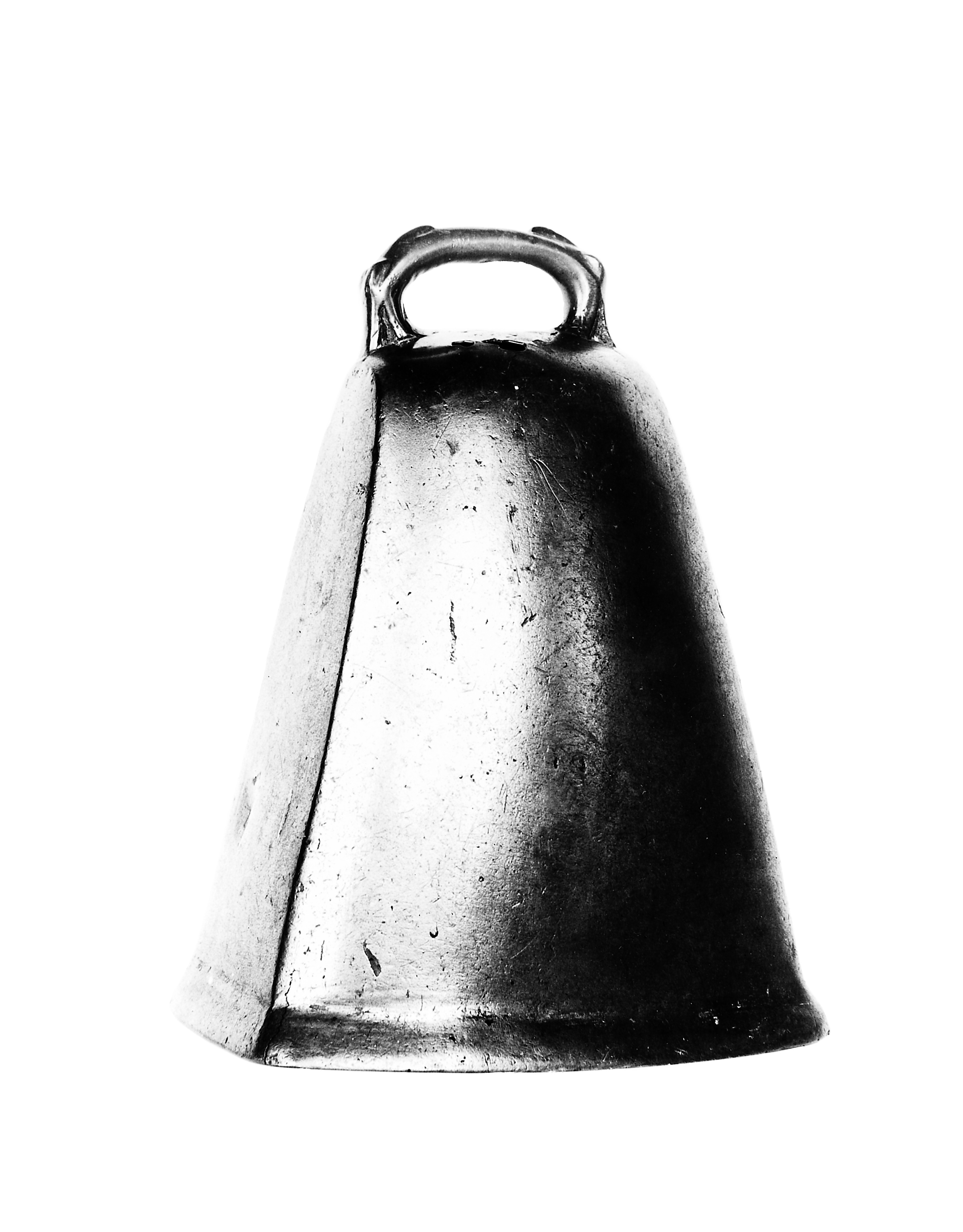
The Bernane was St. Fillan's bronze bell

The Bernane, a cast bronze bell, is also preserved in the museum and was placed over a sufferer's head during healing rituals to heal such afflictions as migraine headaches and more. During the Middle Ages the bell was kept in the care of deoiradh at several Glen Dochart farms. Legend has it that the bell would come to St. Fillan when called. One day a visitor who was unused to seeing bells flying through the air was startled and shot it with an arrow, causing a crack. The Bernane was used in the coronation of King James IV at Scone on 24 June 1488. Another story came about only in the early 19th century, concerning an English tourist who stole the bell. The bell was recovered by Bishop Forbes of the Episcopalian Diocese of Brechin 70 years later, in 1869, who had it placed in the Scottish National Museum in Edinburgh for safe keeping.

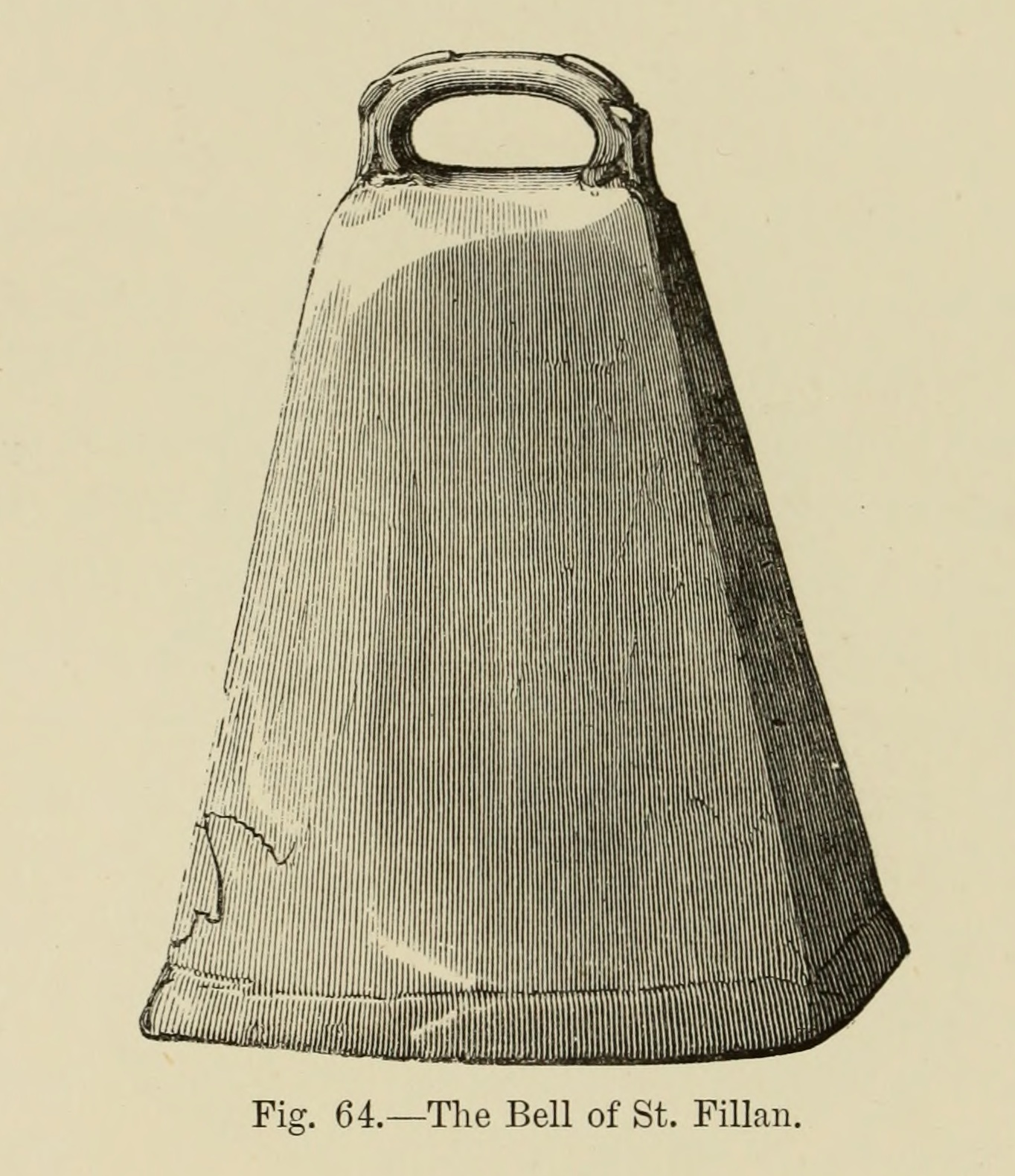
Bell of St Fillan of Glendochart.

Saint Fillan is closely connected to the village of Killin, where he is said to have set up a mill and a market. Still kept at the woollen mill in Killin are a set of river stones which were believed to have been given healing powers by St. Fillan. A particular sequence of movements of an appropriate stone around the afflicted area was believed to result in a cure. Each stone cured a specific part of the body.

== Veneration ==
=== Feast ===
St. Fillan of Munster is commemorated in the Roman Catholic Church on 3 February, and was specially venerated at Cluain Mavscua, County Westmeath, Ireland, and at the villages of Houston and Kilellan, Renfrewshire, Scotland and so early as the 8th or 9th century at Strathfillan, Perthshire, Scotland, where there was an ancient monastery dedicated to him, which, like most of the religious houses of early times, was afterwards secularized.

He is also venerated as a Saint in the Eastern Orthodox Church.

=== Patronage ===
Fillan is the patron saint of the mentally ill. In Strathfillan are the ruins of Saint Fillan's chapel, and hard by is the Holy Pool, in which the insane were, as late as the 19th century, bathed to obtain a cure by the saint's intercession. Scott refers to it in Marmion (Cant. I. xxix).

== Legacy ==
Killallan, or Killellen, an ancient parish in Renfrewshire, took its name from him; (the name deriving from Kil, or cell, of Fillan). It was originally Kilfillan (Church of Fillan). It is now part of the combined parish of Houston and Killellan in Renfrewshire, Scotland. Near the ruins of the old church, situated near Houston, is a stone called Fillan's Seat, and a spring called Fillan's Well existed there until it was filled up, as a remnant of superstition, by a parish minister in the eighteenth century.

In Houston, the Catholic parish church of St. Fillan was established in 1841. In the adjacent village of Kilmacolm, the local Scottish Episcopal church is also named after St. Fillan.

St Fillan's parish church in Aberdour, Fife was first recorded as being associated with St Fillan in 1390; parts of the church date to at least 1123, possibly even predating nearby Aberdour castle with which its history is so closely intertwined.

There was a monastery dedicated to St. Fillan as early as the 8th or 9th century at Strath Fillan in Perthshire. The chapel at Doune Castle was dedicated to Saint Fillan.

St Fillans, Perthshire is a village at the eastern end of Loch Earn near the remains of the 7th century Pictish fort of Dundurn. St Fillans is a locality near the township of Mudgee in New South Wales, Australia.

The Scottish surname MacLellan (MacGille Fhaolain in Scottish Gaeilic) means son of the servant of Saint Fillan.

St. Fillan's spring is referenced in Walter Scott's The Lady of the Lake, as the resting place of the "Harp of the North" invoked at the beginning of the poem.
