= Princess Charlotte (1814 ship) =

British merchant and whaling ship 1814–1856

History

United Kingdom
- Name: Princess Charlotte
- Builder: R & J Bulmer, South Shields
- Launched: 1814
- Fate: Wrecked 14 June 1856

General characteristics
- Tons burthen: 35758/94, or 35949/94 or 360, or 361 (bm)

Princess Charlotte was launched in 1814 at South Shields. She initially sailed as West Indiaman. Then between 1818 and 1819 she made a voyage to India and one to Ceylon, both under a license from the British East India Company (EIC). On her return in 1819, Princess Charlotte became a whaler in the northern whale fishery. She continued whale hunting until ice crushed her on 14 June 1856.

== Career ==
Princess Charlotte first appeared in Register of Shipping (RS) in 1814 and in Lloyd's Register (LR) in 1815.

| Year | Master | Owner | Trade | Source |
|---|---|---|---|---|
| 1814 | Stephenson | Bulmer | | RS |
| 1815 | Stephenson; Leishman | Bullman | London–Jamaica | LR |
| 1818 | Lishman; Reynoldson | Blanchard; Somes & Co. | London–Bombay | LR |

In 1813, the EIC had lost its monopoly on the trade between India and Britain. British ships were then free to sail to India or the Indian Ocean under a license from the EIC.

On 7 March 1818, Princess Charlotte, Leishman, master sailed from Deal for Bombay. She returned to Deal on 11 April 1818.

On 8 July 1818, Princess Charlotte, Rennoldson, master, sailed for Ceylon under a license from the EIC. On 5 April 1819, she was at the Cape of Good Hope, having come from Pointe de Galle. On 8 May, Princess Charlotte was at St Helena. On 1 August, she returned to Deal.

The registers continued to carry Princess Charlotte with unchanged data until 1825–1826 when they showed her master having changed to Adamson and her trade as Dundee.

| Year | Master | Owner | Trade | Source |
|---|---|---|---|---|
| 1825 | Adamson | Blanchard | London–Bengal | |
| 1826 | Adamson | J.Hume | Dundee | LR |

However, in 1820, Princess Charlotte had become a whaler sailing to the Northern Whale Fishery (Greenland and Davis Strait) from Dundee. On 2 January 1820, she entered the graving dock at Dundee. During the 1820 whaling season, she took on board a good part of the oil from Brothers, which had been lost on 29 June at 74°N 25°W. Brothers had taken seven whales before she was lost. In all, Princess Charlotte boiled 150 tons of oil.

In 1821, the Tay Whale Fishing Company paid the carpenter James Smart £854 8s to double Princess Charlotte's hull to strengthen her for whaling in the northern waters.

The data below came primarily from Coltish:

| Year | Master | Where | Whales | Tuns whale oil | Notes |
|---|---|---|---|---|---|
| 1820 | Adamson | Davis Strait | 7 | 149 | |
| 1821 | Adamson | Greenland (GR) | 27 | 218 | |
| 1822 | Adamson | Gr | 7 | 95 | Newspapers reported eight fish (whales) |
| 1823 | Adamson | Gr | 12 | | |
| 1824 | Adamson | Gr | 7 | 90 | |
| 1825 | Adamson | Gr | 10 | 112 | |
| 1826 | Adamson | Gr | 8 | 133 | |
| 1827 | Adamson | Gr | 21 | 230 | |
| 1828 | Adamson | Gr | 33 | 253 (Note: Full ship.) | |
| 1829 | Adamson | Gr | 7 | 105 | |
| 1830 | Adamson | Gr | 0 | 0 | Vessel damaged |
| 1831 | Adamson | Gr | 2 | 30 | |

In 1831, a crew man was killed when he fell from Princess Charlotte's yards.

| Year | Master | Where | Whales | Tuns whale oil | Notes |
|---|---|---|---|---|---|
| 1832 | Adamson | Gr | 26 | 200 | Per newspapers; plus 12 tons whale bone |
| 1833 | Adamson | Gr | 31 | 280 | Full |
| 1834 | Adamson | | 31 | 205 | |
| 1835 | Adamson | | 1 | 18 | |
| 1836 | Adamson | | 2 | 25 | |
| 1837 | Adamson | | 1 | 13 | |

In 1837, Princess Charlotte rescued Swan, and her crew. Swan was one of several vessels that had over-wintered in the Arctic, having been trapped by ice. In January 1837, the government offered a bounty of £300 to relief ships that sailed before 5 February, and a further £500 to any vessel that was able to help one of the distressed whalers in the edge of the ice, or £1000 for a vessel fast beset by ice. Princess Charlotte came upon Swan on 5 May and brought her into Whalefish Island Harbour on 22 May. Princess Charlotte received the £500 bounty, and salvage of £700 for having led the recovery of Swan.

| Year | Master | Where | Whales | Tuns whale oil | Notes |
|---|---|---|---|---|---|
| 1838 | Deuchars | | 23 | 234 | |
| 1839 | Deuchars | | 3 | 41 | |
| 1840 | Deuchars | | | | |
| 1841 | Deuchars | | 4 | 57 | |
| 1842 | Deuchars | | 11 | 135 | |

During this period (1820–1842), a voyage yielded an average 12 fish (whales) and 118 tuns of whale oil. Thus each fish yielded an average 9.7 tuns of oil.

| Year | Master | Where | Whales | Tuns whale oil | Notes |
|---|---|---|---|---|---|
| 1843 | | | 6 | 60 | |
| 1844 | | DS | 1 | 10 | |

Princess Charlotte continued to whale for another dozen years.

== Fate ==
In June 1856, Princess Charlotte was in Davis Strait having had reasonable success; she had gathered five whales, 75 tuns of whale oil, and 5 tons of whale bone. On 14 June, as she was sailing between two ice floes in Melville Bay, the ice suddenly closed in on her and crushed her, sinking her. The crew were barely able to get on the ice before she sank, and lost everything. Other whalers, which were following, took on the crew: Captain Deuchars and 24 men went on Advice (of Dundee), eight men went on Chieftain (of Kirkaldy), eight men went on Truelove (of Hull), and seven men went on St Andrew (of Aberdeen).

When the ice crushed Princess Charlotte, Deuchars blew her hull open. This enabled the crew to rescue their clothes, but also the rum ration.
