= Lochearnhead =

Coordinates: 56.383°N 4.283°W

Lochearnhead: Scottish Gaelic: Ceann Loch Èireann
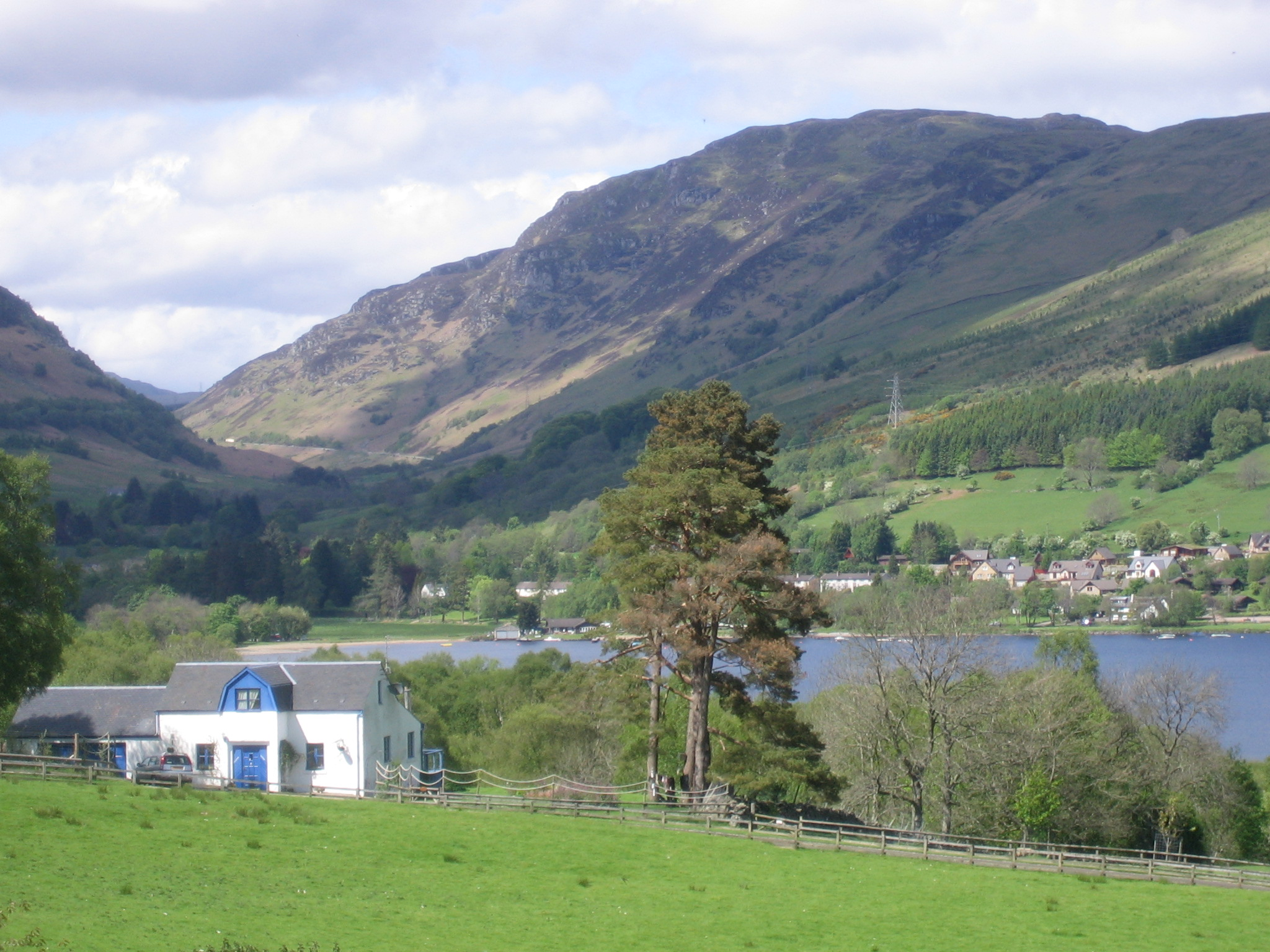
- Lochearnhead and Glen Ogle

- Location within the Stirling council area
- OS grid reference: NN590235
  - Edinburgh: 52 mi (84 km)
  - London: 377 mi (607 km)
- Civil parish: Comrie
- Council area: Stirling
- Lieutenancy area: Stirling and Falkirk
- Country: Scotland
- Sovereign state: United Kingdom
- Post town: LOCHEARNHEAD
- Postcode district: FK19
- Dialling code: 01567; 01877
- Police: Scotland
- Fire: Scottish
- Ambulance: Scottish
- UK Parliament: Stirling and Strathallan
- Scottish Parliament: Stirling

Lochearnhead (Scottish Gaelic: Ceann Loch Èireann) is a village in Perthshire on the A84 Stirling to Crianlarich road at the foot of Glen Ogle, 14 miles (23 kilometres) north of the Highland Boundary Fault. It is situated at the western end of Loch Earn where the A85 road from Crieff meets the A84.

Loch Earn is 317 feet (97 metres) above sea level, with the settlement running from its shores up to higher ground on the hills at the mouth of Glen Ogle. Lochearnhead lies within the Breadalbane area of the Loch Lomond and The Trossachs National Park.

== Early history ==
The first evidence of people in Lochearnhead comes from Mesolithic arrowheads found in Glen Ogle by former local policeman Tom Gibbon, and his son Donald. A settled population is in evidence in the Neolithic period, from a burial chamber at Edinchip, and from the cup-marked stones which lie between the Kendrum Burn and the Craggan Road, in what is known locally as the Druid Field. There is another site with cup and ring marks at the head of Glen Ogle.

There are two crannogs still visible on Loch Earn, one at the west end of the loch in Carstran Bay, below Edinample Castle, the other at the east end of the loch, at St Fillans, known as Neish Island. (Other submerged possible crannog sites also exist, and recent surveys by the Scottish Crannog Centre and others suggest the known number may increase if the archaeology is enabled to go ahead). These man-made islands probably date from the Bronze Age, although Neish Island was inhabited (latterly by the Clan Neish, for whom it is now named) until 1612.

== The Pictish frontier ==
Loch Earn was on the frontier between Pictland and Dalriada, or Dál Riata. Dundurn at the east end of the loch being a Pictish frontier fort. This lends weight to the argument that the name Earn therefore comes from Eireann, in other words "the loch of the Irish".

The siege, by the Scots, of the Pictish Fort of Dundurn in 683 AD is mentioned in the Annals of Ulster. Giric, (sometimes called Grig), King of Picts and Scots, is said to have been killed at Dundurn in 889, and is buried in Iona.

== Feudal estates ==
Although Norman nobles had been obtaining land in Scotland for a century beforehand, the coming of the feudal era is attributed to David I of Scotland in the first half of the 12th century. Feudalism proved the backdrop for local history for several centuries, not least in land ownership patterns. The ownership map of the land around Loch Earn changed as land owning families came and went, and the shape of estates fluctuated, partly through the politics of inheritance. Three family names associated with Lochearnhead are MacLaren, Stewart and MacGregor. The first of these is recorded in 1296, when Lauren of Ardveich had his name entered into the Ragman Roll. The MacLaren burial ground at Leckine was last used in 1993.

By the time the Stewarts came to Ardvorlich in 1582, the Reformed church, under the guidance of John Knox, had been adopted in Scotland for more than two decades.

It was nearly two centuries later that the MacGregors acquired Edinchip, in 1778, building the current Edinchip House in 1830.

== Language ==
Lochearnhead is a post-Gaelic speaking area. According to the Old Statistical Account of 1799, Scottish Gaelic was the language of the "common people" of the area, although it also tells us that in the spring the young men would go herding in the "low country" (around Stirling), where they would "have the advantage of acquiring the English language". This would in fact have been the Scots language of the Stirlingshire area, rather than Standard English.

By 1837, the New Statistical Account tells us that in the area, "Gaelic is the language generally spoken, but it has been rather losing ground within the last forty years". At the time of the 1881 Census, when a question about Gaelic was included for the first time, there were still more than 70% in the parish with Gaelic as their first language, and even some with Gaelic as their only language.

Regular church services were held locally in Gaelic up until 1930, Today the generation which remembers native Gaelic being spoken is fast dying out, and any Gaelic speakers are likely to be either learners or incomers from Gaelic-speaking heartlands. To this day, though, "Church Gaelic" is based on the Perthshire Gaelic dialect. The first Gaelic Bible was translated by Balquhidder minister Robert Kirk.

== Legends and folklore ==
=== Each uisge ===
It is said that a water horse, or each-uisge, inhabits Loch Earn, having been chased, in some variants of the legend, out of Loch Tay and across the hills by Fingal. This creature would entice people to ride on its back, but the rider's hands would stick to the creature's neck, and the unfortunate soul would be dragged under water by the Each Uisge to drown.

The unpredictable currents in Loch Earn may have given a ring of truth to this legend.

=== Fairies ===
The hillock in the Games Field, known as Chieftains' Mound or the Shian (an Sitheann), is said to be a fairy knoll. (Sídhe, sìth or siodhe refers to earthen mounds that were thought to be home to the fairy folk.) In less cynical times, people attuned to the supernatural were said to report green light emanating from it, or to hear the strains of fairy music coming from within.

=== Edinample Castle, haunted and cursed ===
Edinample Castle has several legends attached to it. The best-known is that 'Black' Duncan Campbell, a man known for his fury and his ornery nature, had asked the architect to build the castle with a parapet, but on discovering that there was not one threw the hapless architect off the roof to his death. His ghost is said to haunt the castle, wandering around the roof where the parapet should have been.

The building and its inhabitants are also said to be cursed. Depending on which version is told, this curse is either a result of a witch's malediction, or because gravestones were used as building materials.

Yet another legend has it that the 6th century holy man, Saint Blane, cursed the lands and the previous building said to have stood on the spot.

=== Ardvorlich severed head ===
The following gruesome tale is factual, but is included here in a section on legends since it is recounted for its sensational nature, and because it provided the inspiration for Sir Walter Scott's tale, "A Legend of Montrose".

It was the custom to provide hospitality to anyone who asked for food and shelter. In accordance with this custom, Lady Margaret Stewart at Ardvorlich, pregnant at the time, gave hospitality to some travelling MacGregors. However, they had just come from murdering her brother, John Drummond of Drummonderinoch, and while she was out of the room placed his severed head on a silver platter, and placed in his mouth some of the cold victuals she had served them. She was so distraught that she ran out to the hills and gave birth to James Stewart, later known as Mad Major. The lochan she gave birth by is known as Lochan na Mna, the Lochan of the Woman, on the side of Beinn Domhnuill. Major James Stewart is one of the great historical characters of the Covenanting Wars and is the hero of Sir Walter Scott's novel A Legend of Montrose, in which he changed James Stewart's name to Allan Macauley. This name is actually engraved on the foot of Major Stewart's gravestone in the Stewarts of Ardvorlich old kirk of Dundurn just outside the village of St Fillans on the shores of Loch Earn.

=== Ardvorlich Lifting Stone ===
Outside Ardvorlich house sits a large granite boulder. This is the Ardvorlich Lifting Stone. It is smooth, round, unbalanced and seldom lifted due to its incredible weight and lack of grip. The stone was weighed at 152kg (or 332lbs) and sits in the shade of trees; as a result, it can have a green, mossy tinge to it. As of 2023, the stone has been lifted to chest by fewer than twenty stone lifters and has only been shouldered four times. As such, it has earned a reputation as being the pinnacle of Scottish stone lifting, akin to the Husafell Stone in Iceland. No formal permission is required to lift the stone, but it is a local courtesy to make introductions to the residents of Ardvorlich House.

== Development of communications ==
Like many highland communities, until the coming of the military road, Lochearnhead consisted of little more than a scattered collection of cottages, crofts, and the more prosperous farms associated with the estates. The first part of the old Lochearnhead Hotel was built in 1746, taking advantage of the improving communications. Before that, the area had been served by the much smaller and more primitive Lochearnhead Old Inn, which stood opposite where the village shop is now, and whose ruins were still in evidence until they were demolished in the 1980s, due to their dangerous condition.

The military road was built in the aftermath of the Jacobite risings, and its coming, along with the hotel, gave focus to the village centre, until then little more than a few houses at the junction between the old roads that ran along the routes of the current A84 and A85. One of the original drove routes south ran down Glen Ogle and along the northern side of Loch Earn to Crieff. When the market was switched to Falkirk in around 1700, the main route ran south from Lochearnhead.

A minute of the Society in Scotland for Propagating Christian Knowledge, dated 3 April 1714, sets aside monies for the founding of a school at Lochearnhead. This is the old school, now a dwelling, which stands on the roadside by what was known as the Loanie, a track running beside the old Raven's Croft. The Loanie was blocked off when the houses comprising what is now Ravenscroft Road were built in the late 1970s and early 1980s.

In 1750, work began on the military road from Stirling to Fort William. This ran by Callander, Lochearnhead and Tyndrum and when it was completed, the village rose in prominence. A Post Office was opened in 1800.

According to the Minute Book of the Deacons Court of the Free Church, between the founding of the Free Church of Scotland, as a result of the Disruption of 1843, and the starting of the minute book in 1846, Lochearnhead had a Free Church, a Church School and a Manse. The church passed back to the Church of Scotland after the reunion of 1929, and fell out of use in the 1970s. It is now a dwelling house. The Manse is now the Mansewood Country House Hotel. The school referred to is the current school, situated on School Lane, behind the village hall.

It was the coming of the railways that had the greatest effect on the village. In 1870, the Callander and Oban Railway, was completed and in 1904 the railway was extended along Loch Earn to St Fillans and Crieff, making Lochearnhead an easy place to visit (while the railway junction was actually at Balquhidder, 3 km [2 mi] to the south, until the opening of Lochearnhead station on the new line Balquhidder station was called Lochearnhead). With the rise in Scottish tourism in Victorian times, the town became a popular destination from which tourists could enjoy the tranquility of Loch Earn. A number of small hotels were built around 1900. A motor vessel, the Queen of Loch Earn, plied the loch from 1922 until 1936, after which she was moored at St Fillans and used as a houseboat. The railways were short-lived and with the rise of motor transport, the St Fillans rail line closed in 1951. Although Beeching cuts included for the closure of the main line in 1965, it was actually closed because of landslides in Glen Ogle shortly before the planned closure date. The rockfall itself was a very minor affair, and has nothing to do with the many boulders visible above and below the line, which have been there for thousands of years, however in response to the local minister offering to clear it up, it was alleged by British Rail engineers that there was a great risk of a larger amount of material coming down. This was publicised on TV at the time. This prediction has not yet happened, and it was notable that nothing significant happened to that side of the valley in August 2004.

August 2004 saw more landslides, this time across the glen from railway line. The road was engulfed in mud, after unusually heavy and prolonged rain, trapping several motorists, and bringing the attention of the national and international media as the world debated climate change and "wild weather".

== Recent developments ==
The village has maintained its tourist status and has become a centre of water sports including water skiing, kayaking, canoeing, dinghy sailing and scuba diving. Loch Earn is particularly known for its water skiing and championships are held there. The old Lochearnhead Hotel, which was situated opposite the village green at the junction of the A84 and A85, was burned down in the early hours of November 5, 1982. The Cameron family then bought and renamed the Craigroystan hotel, which overlooks the loch. This new Lochearnhead Hotel has since changed ownership.

== The turbulent past ==
The town has been witness to Scotland's turbulent past. A kilometre along the South Loch Earn road is Edinample Castle, built by 'Black' Duncan Campbell of Glenorchy in 1630. Some three kilometres to the east is Ardvorlich House, home of the Stewarts of Ardvorlich since 1580. Near here is a tombstone for seven Macdonalds of Glencoe who were killed while attempting a raid on Ardvorlich House in 1620.

== Highland Games ==
The Balquhidder, Lochearnhead, and Strathyre Highland Games and Gathering celebrated its 200th anniversary in 2007. The Games is held in Lochearnhead on the second last Saturday of July. Events include the hill race, track and field events, heavy events like the caber and weight throwing, piping and pipe bands and highland dancing competitions. It is an opportunity for friends and family who may have left for other parts to return to the village and catch up.

== The Findlater Sisters ==
The Findlater Sisters, Jane Findlater (1866–1946), and Mary Findlater (1865–1963), were daughters of the Free Kirk Manse, and grew up in what is now the Mansewood Hotel. They wrote novels and short stories separately and together, and were very popular in their day. Jane's novels include The Green Graves of Balgowrie (1896), and her collections of short stories include Seven Scots Stories (1912). Mary wrote six novels, including The Rose of Joy (1903). Her short story "Void of Understanding" was broadcast as a BBC Radio Scotland production in the early 1990s. Both had stories included in the 1987 Polygon anthology The Other Voice: Scottish women's writing since 1808 (M Burgess, ed).

Neither sister married, and they lived together until Jane died in 1946.

== Sheep shearing ==
The annual sheep shearing competition, Lochearnhead Shears, was established in 1993, growing to become one of the largest sheep shearing competitions in the United Kingdom. The event attracts international competitors, who come to attempt to win the "Scottish Blackface Shearing Champion" title. Blackface sheep are the areas' main breed, these mountain sheep requiring the competitors to use particular skills. The competition is held in June, and normally culminates in a ceilidh dance.

== Hertfordshire Scouts Activity Centre ==
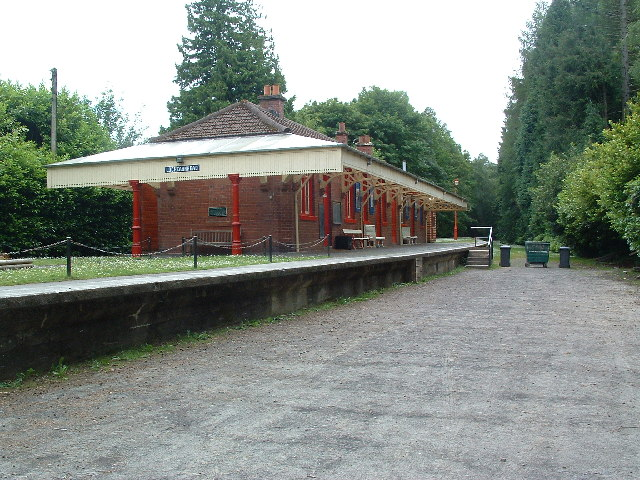
The old station, now an activities centre

In 1962, Hertfordshire Scouts opened their first activity centre in the former Lochearnhead railway station. After extensive refurbishment of the derelict site the station buildings were converted to include the facilities they required, including a kitchen and dining room. The centre was aptly named the Lochearnhead Scout Activity Station.

Entrance to the station is just north of the village on a private slip road, with a large sign proclaiming the site of the station. The Glen Ogle trail runs on the northern side of the station and the station is clearly visible. The original subway entrance to the station now backs onto a modern housing estate on the A84/A85 junction and is used as storage for camping gear etc. A pathway through the housing estate to the junction provides foot access to the station with a small gate in the surrounding fenceline.

Recently, the main station buildings have benefited from further refurbishment and now a collection of Scandinavian style log cabins surround the platform to the north, additional cabins provide further accommodation on the platform and surrounding areas while improvements in water and drainage connections have allowed improved washroom facilities. The current facilities provide comfortable accommodation for 82 people, with the Station building containing the Station Master's Office, commercial quality kitchen, large dining room, adjoining sun lounge, showers and toilets. The site also includes a second shower and toilet block as well as a dedicated sick bay, drying room and stores.

While the main activities run from the station are mountain based, Hertfordshire Scouts also have the use of a small jetty on Loch Earn which is used during the summer holiday for dinghy sailing and kayaking activities. The station is in constant use throughout all the English school holidays, but the remainder of the time it is available for hire by other people.

== Walks ==
There are two Munros on Loch Earn side, Ben Vorlich and Stùc a' Chroin. For more family-friendly walks, there is the Glen Ogle trail and Glen Ample.

=== Glen Ogle Trail ===
Glen Ogle can be walked as a circular route, starting on the Lochearnhead stretch of Millennium Cycle Route 7 along the Western side of Glen Ogle on the old high level railway, and returning down the floor of the glen. Alternatively, one can simply retrace one's steps on the cycle route. Many of the guides suggest starting from the Scout station, but that requires a very steep climb to the cycle route. A gentler start is from the Episcopal church at the bottom of Craggan Road. Following this single track road brings one to an old railway bridge, where the cycle route can be followed south towards Callander or north towards Killin. Turning towards Killin leads onto the Glen Ogle section.

=== Glen Ample Walk ===
Starting at Edinample Falls, on the south shore of Loch Earn, this is a ramble on a well established route, which varies from stony tracks to grassy paths, and leads through Glen Ample to Ardchullarie on Loch Lubnaig. One then needs to return on the same path, or arrange transport from Ardchullarie. There are two burns which need careful crossing after heavy rain. The walk is 14 km, taking about 4½ hours. The glen is not especially attractive, and its lower half is afforested; interest is added by two of the most remarkable 'rock slope failures' in the Highlands, on its east side. At the foot of Glen Ample, the entire hillside of Ben Our is the second largest landslip zone after Beinn Fhada in Kintail giving rise to a platy pattern of fractures well seen from Glenoglehead in low sun or thin snow; broken ground along the slopefoot supports native woodland. Near the head of Glen Ample, the slopes of Beinn Each (pronounced 'yuk') have broken out into an eggbox pattern. The glen follows the Loch Tay Fault, one of the most important in the Highlands, which continues north-east to Glen Tilt beyond Blair Atholl. The glen is thus a geological Site of Special Scientific Interest.

(OS Map Landranger 51 and 57 / Explorer 365 and 368, Grid ref: NN 602225).

== Sources ==
=== Books ===
- AA Illustrated Road Book of Scotland (1974 edition) The Automobile Association
- A. R. B. Haldane (1952) The Drove Roads of Scotland, David & Charles, Newton Abbot
- A. R. B. Haldane (1962) New Roads through the Glens, David & Charles, Newton Abbot
- P. J. G. Ransom (1994) Loch Earn: A Guide for Visitors, Particularly Those Going Afloat, P. J. G. Ransom

=== Newspaper articles ===
- Scotsman - Article on Railway

== Notes ==
- "BBC". BBC News. 19 August 2004. 2004 landslip story on BBC.
