= Battle of Glenboultachan =

Scottish clan battle in 1522

- Part of Clan Macnab and Clan MacNeish feud
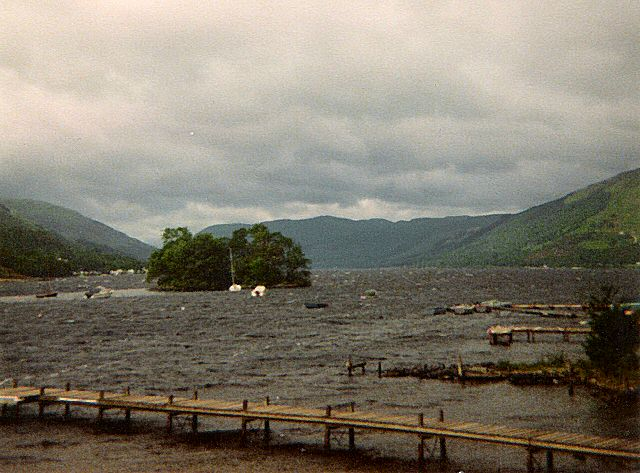
- Neish Island on Loch Earn
Date	1522
Location	Glenboultachan, Perthshire, Scotland
Result	Macnab victory

Belligerents
Clan Macnab	Clan MacNeish

Commanders and leaders
Finlay Macnab	

Strength
	500

Casualties and losses
	470 killed ("only thirty of 500 MacNeishes had survived")

The Battle of Glenboultachan was a Scottish clan battle fought in 1522 in Glen Boultachan, Perthshire, Scottish Highlands. It was fought between the Clan Macnab and the Clan Neish or MacNeish. The Macnabs won the battle.

== Background ==
It is recorded that in 1490 James IV of Scotland issued a warrant to Lord Drummond that read:

Whin is dias fra this dai furth to get cast doon ye hoos of ye Easter Isle of Loch Earn and distroy all ye strengthis of ye samen and tak away ye bate and put her to ye Wester Isle

This translates as:

Cast down the house of the Ester (eastern) Isle of Loch Ern and destroy all the strengths of the same and take away the boat and put it at the Wester (western) Isle

The Neishes apparently had the only boat on the loch and although the dwelling was demolished the Neishes repaired it and continued to live there, occupying most of the land near St Fillans and as far west as Tyndrum. The Clan Macnab and Clan Neish were at feud due to a long series of petty jealousies and grievances on both sides. Frequently small groups of the clans had met and fought each other, but finally both clans mustered their full force and met at Glenboltachan where a regular battle took place.

== The battle ==
The final battle between the two clans took place where the farm of Littleport is located about two miles north of the lower end of Loch Earn in the Glen of Boultachan in 1522. Finlay Macnab gathered together all of his fighting men for one final effort for the supremacy of the northern Loch Earn district. During the battle the chief of the Neishes long held his own, standing with his back to a large boulder. Eventually he was overcome and fell covered with wounds. According to tradition his blood still stains the boulder. Three sons of the Neish chief perished by his side. The rest of the Neishes also fought stubbornly but they were finally overcome and only a remnant of them were able to escape. Only thirty of the 500 Neishes survived the battle.

== Aftermath ==
The remaining Neishes settled on an island on Loch Earn, Neish Island, under the leadership of one of the relatives of their former chief. The feud between the Neishes and Macnabs continued and in one incident in 1612, the Neishes ambushed a Macnab servant, or according to another account some MacNab clansmen, who had been sent by his chief to procure provisions and drink for the Christmas celebrations. The Neishes took all the goods and mistreated the servant who warned the Neishes that there would be reprisals, but they laughed at his threats and retreated to their island. In response the Macnab chief sent his twelve sons to attack the Neishes on their island stronghold. The Neishes having succumbed to the drink were all killed except for one small boy who hid under a bed and from who all of the name Neish are allegedly descended. The leader of the Macnabs, "smooth John", then decapitated the Neish chieftain before they departed, keeping his head as a trophy. The boat that the Macnabs used to get to and from the island was abandoned by them and could apparently still be seen by passers-by as late as the eighteenth century. Another account states that the boat was still to be seen in the nineteenth century. The Macnab chief's coat of arms includes "an open boat, ores in action", and the Neish's head appears on the crest badge for the Clan Macnab.
