= Dalchonzie Halt railway station =

Railway station in Perth and Kinross, Scotland

Dalchonzie Halt

General information
- Location: Comrie, Perth and Kinross; Scotland
- Coordinates: 56.3829°N 4.0418°W
- Grid reference: NN740230
- Platforms: 1

Other information
- Status: Disused

History
- Original company: Lochearnhead, St Fillans and Comrie Railway
- Pre-grouping: Caledonian Railway
- Post-grouping: London, Midland and Scottish Railway

Key dates
- 1 September 1903: Opened
- 1 October 1951: Station closed
Location

Dalchonzie Halt railway station, Dalchonzie Platform railway station or Dalchonzie Siding in the Parish of Comrie, Perth and Kinross, Scotland was an intermediate stop on what became the Caledonian Railway's Crieff - Lochearnhead - Balquhidder branch line. It served the rural Strathearn area near Dunira, Dalchonzie House and Drumlochlan Wood from 1903 to 1951.

== History ==
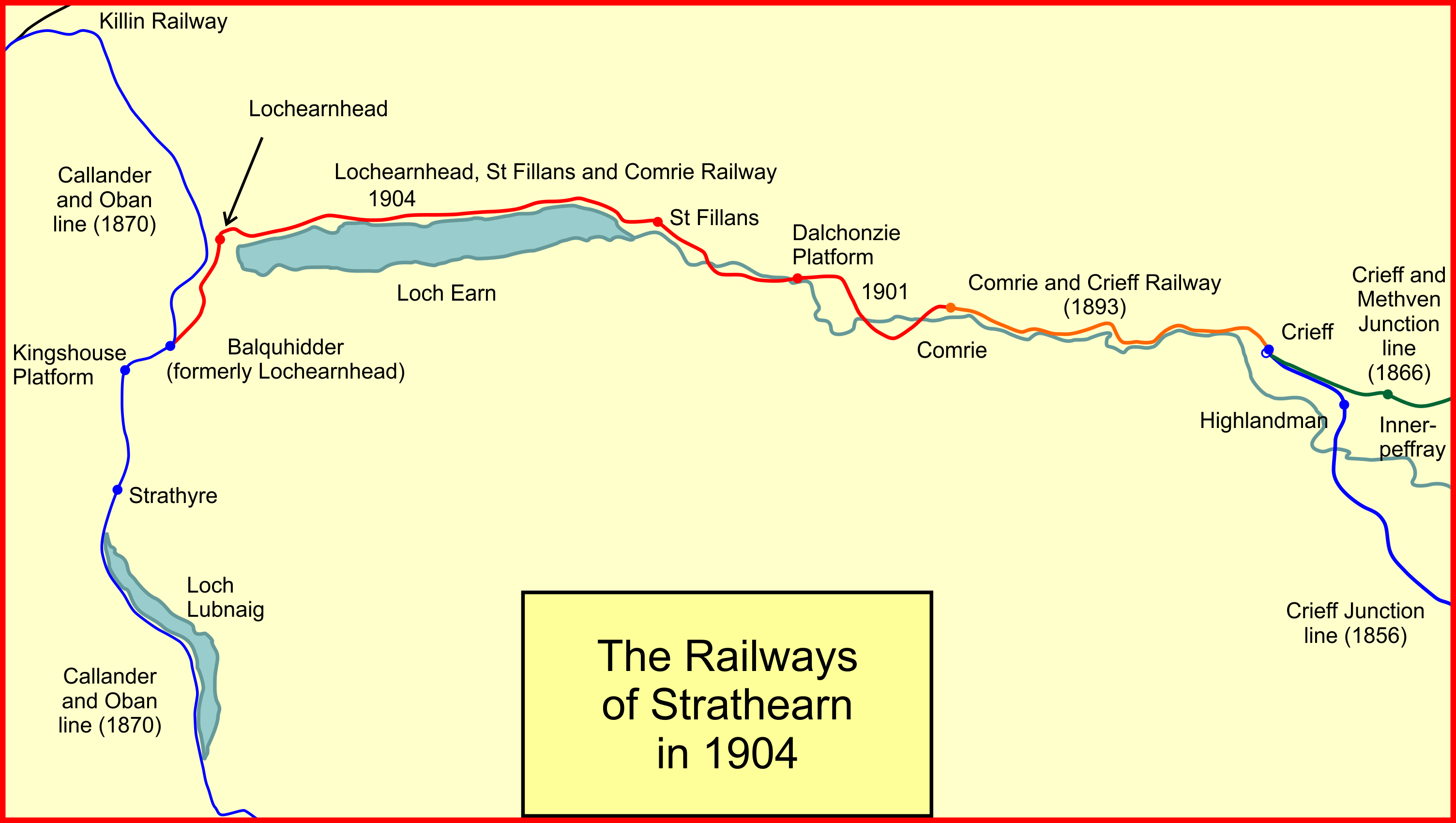
The railways of Strathearn in 1904

Dalchonzie station in Strathearn was opened as Dalchonzie Platform in 1903. In 1905 the Lochearnhead, St Fillans and Comrie Railway opened a single-storey signal box built into a cottage. By 1923 the Caledonian Railway had become part of the London, Midland and Scottish Railway. In 1912 it is recorded as a station on the Bartholomew Survey Atlas and in 1927 the station is recorded as a halt. During construction works the railway company were required to plant a large number of trees were to screen the railway in this attractive rural district.

In 1903 three trains a day ran. However, Dalchonzie was a request stop with passengers required to inform the guard at Comrie or St Fillans if they wished to alight. In May 1948 trains still stopped at Dalchonzie only upon request and passengers waiting to be picked up had to give at least 5 minutes notice at the station. Heavy luggage and bicycles were not accepted.

== Infrastructure ==
The short single platformed wooden halt stood opposite the signal box at the entrance to a lane leading to Dalchonzie House with the Dunira estate entrance on the signal box side. The signal box controlled the level crossing and the nameboards carried the name 'Dalchonzie Siding'.

== The site today ==
The track remained in situ after closure until 1959 to allow for the movement of construction materials for the Glen Lednock hydro-electric schemes . The signal box survives as part of the now private ex-railway cottage. Work is underway to create a cycle and pedestrian route using the trackbed of the old railway route.

== Notes ==
Preceding station	Historical railways	Following station
St Fillans; Line and station closed	Lochearnhead, St Fillans and Comrie Railway	Comrie; Line and station closed
