= St Fillans railway station =

Disused railway station in St Fillans, Perth and Kinross

St Fillans
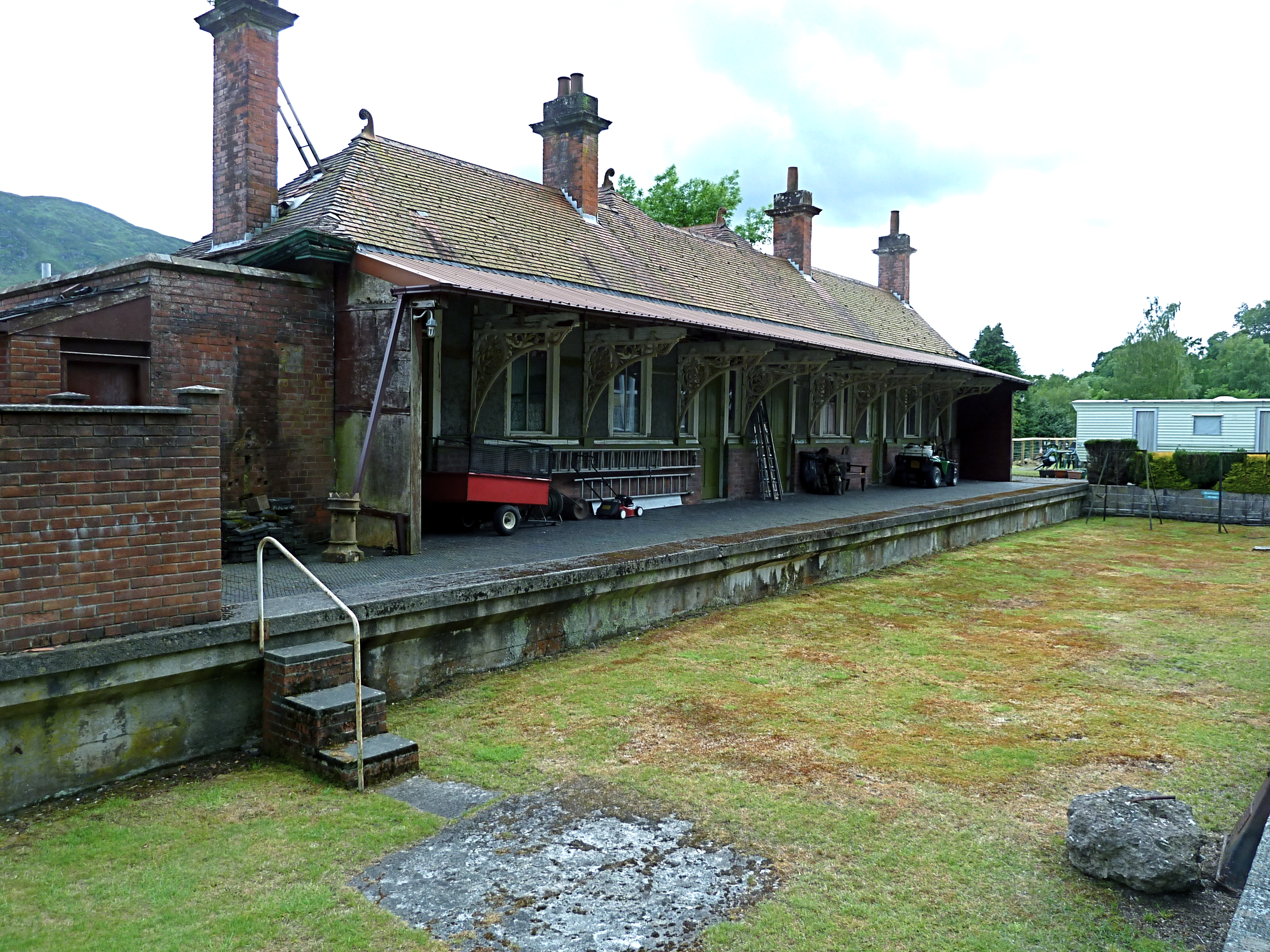
- The site of the station in 2012

General information
- Location: St Fillans, Perthshire; Scotland
- Coordinates: 56.394°N 4.1083°W
- Grid reference: NN699244
- Platforms: 2

Other information
- Status: Disused

History
- Original company: Lochearnhead, St Fillans and Comrie Railway
- Pre-grouping: Caledonian Railway
- Post-grouping: London, Midland and Scottish Railway

Key dates
- 1 October 1901: Opened
- 1 October 1951: Closed
Location

St Fillans railway station served the village of St Fillans, in the historical county of Perthshire, Scotland, from 1901 to 1951 on the Lochearnhead, St Fillans and Comrie Railway.

== History ==
The station was opened on 1 October 1901 by the Lochearnhead, St Fillans and Comrie Railway. On the westbound platform was the station building and to the north was the goods yard. It also had a signal box. The station closed on 1 October 1951.

Preceding station	Disused railways	Following station
Dalchonzie Halt; Line and station closed	Lochearnhead, St Fillans and Comrie Railway	Lochearnhead; Line and station closed
