= Lochearnhead railway station =

Former railway station in Scotland

Lochearnhead
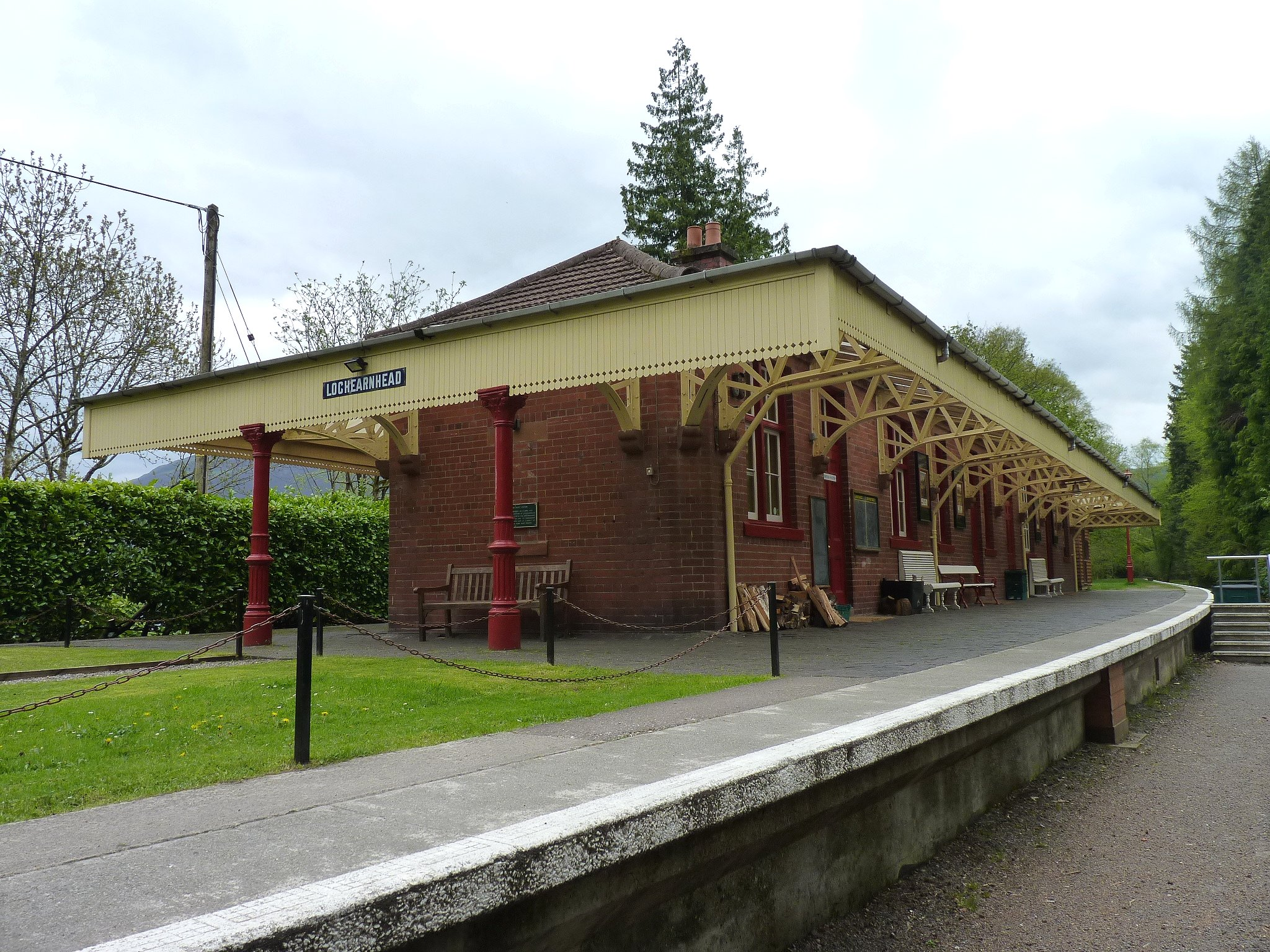
- The former Lochearnhead station, now a Scout activity centre

General information
- Location: Lochearnhead, Stirling (district); Scotland
- Coordinates: 56.385610°N 4.289027°W
- Platforms: 2

Other information
- Status: Disused, now a Scout activity centre

History
- Pre-grouping: Comrie, St Fillans & Lochearnhead Railway operated by Caledonian Railway

Key dates
- 1 May 1904: Official opening date
- 1 October 1951: Official closure date
Location

Lochearnhead is a former railway station in the village of Lochearnhead in Perthshire. It opened in 1904 as part of the Comrie, St Fillans & Lochearnhead Railway, but closed in 1951. Since 1962, the station has been used as a Scout centre for youth adventurous activities.

== History ==
The first station named Lochearnhead was actually at Balquhidder about 2 miles (3.2 km) south of the village, which opened as part of the Callander and Oban Railway on 1 June 1870,

In October 1901, the first stretch of the Comrie, St Fillans & Lochearnhead Railway opened between Comrie and St Fillans. In order to reach Lochearnhead, the next 10 miles (16 km) stretch of line had to pass through a 62 yards (57 m) tunnel and cross numerous viaducts, the largest being one that crosses Glen Ogle, which has nine concrete arches, each with a 40 feet (12 m) span. The projected cost of that section was £113,000. The line opened on 1 May 1904, with the new station in Lochearnhead village commencing scheduled passenger services on 1 July, when the old station was renamed Balquhidder railway station. Lochearnhead and Balquhidder were finally connected in May 1905, with a service of three trains daily, each requiring four coupled tank engines to negotiate the steep rise to Balquhidder with gradients of up to 1:60.

Situated on the western side of the village, the station has an island platform, as it formed a passing loop on an otherwise single-tracked line; the canopied platforms being accessed through a pedestrian tunnel. A goods yard was on the west side of the station, and to the south, there was a signal box which was tall enough for the signalman to see over the station building, but this closed in 1921.

The station was on closed on 1 July 1917, but reopened on 1 February 1919. The line closed to freight traffic in 1950, and was finally closed for passengers on 1 October 1951. However, the track was later reopened for use in the construction of the Breadalbane Hydro-Electric Scheme until 1959.

=== Routes ===
| Preceding station | Historical railways | Following station |
|---|---|---|
| Balquhidder | Caledonian Railway; Lochearnhead, St Fillans and Comrie Railway | St Fillans |

=== Lochearnhead Scout Station ===
In 1960, Hertfordshire Scout County obtained a lease on the station from British Rail, for the conversion of the building into a base for adventurous activities. The Scout Station was opened on 4 August 1962, by the Chief Scout of The Scout Association, Sir Charles Maclean. Following a fundraising appeal and grants from Hertfordshire County Council and the Department of Education and Science, Hertfordshire Scouts were able to purchase the property outright in 1977. In 1995, new sleeping accommodation and a shower block were opened by the Chief Scout, Sir Garth Morrison and in 2019, the centre won the National Railway Heritage Award for its restoration of the platform canopy.
