= Balquhidder railway station =

Railway station in Stirling, Scotland

Balquhidder
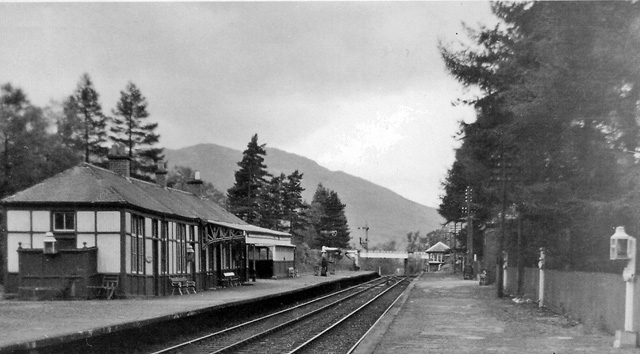
- Balquhidder railway station in 1961

General information
- Location: Lochearnhead, Stirling (district); Scotland
- Coordinates: 56.35919°N 4.30978°W
- Platforms: 3

Other information
- Status: Disused

History
- Original company: Callander and Oban Railway
- Pre-grouping: Callander and Oban Railway operated by Caledonian Railway

Key dates
- 1 June 1870: Opened as Lochearnhead
- 1 July 1904: Renamed as Balquhidder
- 18 December 1904: Station relocated south of original site
- 28 September 1965: Effective closure date
- 1 November 1965: Official closure date
Location

Balquhidder was a railway station around two miles south of Lochearnhead, Stirling (district). It was where the Callander and Oban Railway was joined by the Comrie, St Fillans & Lochearnhead Railway from Crieff.

== History ==
=== Opening and development ===
When opened as part of the Callander and Oban Railway on 1 June 1870, Balquhidder station was called Lochearnhead. The station was laid out with two platforms, one on either side of a crossing loop. There were sidings on the east side of the station. The station was renamed as Balquhidder on 1 July 1904. To the north was a goods yard, which opened before the station in 1868 and on the southbound platform was the station building. It also had a signal box, which opened in 1890.

Balquhidder station was relocated slightly further south on 18 December 1904 in preparation for it becoming a junction with the Comrie, St Fillans & Lochearnhead Railway. Upon the opening of the junction on 1 May 1905, the station boasted two signal boxes and an engine shed.

=== Closure ===
When the line to Crieff closed on 1 October 1951, the station ceased to be a junction.

The crossing loop was taken out of use on 21 March 1965.

This station was closed with the Callander and Oban line on 28 September 1965, six weeks before the scheduled closure on 1 November 1965 due to a landslide in Glen Ogle.

=== Routes ===
Preceding station	Historical railways	Following station
Kingshouse	Callander and Oban Railway; Operated by the Caledonian Railway	Glenoglehead
Terminus	Caledonian Railway; Lochearnhead, St Fillans and Comrie Railway	Lochearnhead

== Current status ==
The site is now a holiday park with log cabins, caravans, camping etc. Recently the station steps were repainted and repairs were undertaken to the crumbling wall of the remains of the waiting room. The pedestrian tunnel can still be accessed though is blocked half way through. Across the road, the old post office is now the site of the Golden Larches Restaurant. Only portions of the platforms and the goods yard remain.
