= Ben Vorlich =

Ben Vorlich may refer to the following hills in Scotland:

- Ben Vorlich, Loch Earn
- Ben Vorlich, Loch Lomond
