= Mary Findlater =

Scottish novelist and poet (1865–1963)

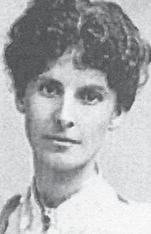
- Mary Findlater, from a 1904 publication.
- Born: Mary Williamina Findlater; March 28, 1865; Lochearnhead
- Died: November 22, 1963 (aged 98); St. Fillans
- Relatives: Jane Findlater

Mary Williamina Findlater (28 March 1865 – 22 November 1963) was a Scottish novelist and poet.

== Early life ==
Mary Williamina Findlater was born at Lochearnhead, Perthshire, the second daughter of the Rev. Eric John Thomson Findlater and Sarah Borthwick Findlater. Her father was a minister of the Free Church of Scotland; he died in 1886. Her mother worked with her own sister, Jane Borthwick, to compile Hymns from the Land of Luther (1855), a book of translated German-language hymns, before she married. Writer Jane Findlater was her younger sister and lifelong collaborator.

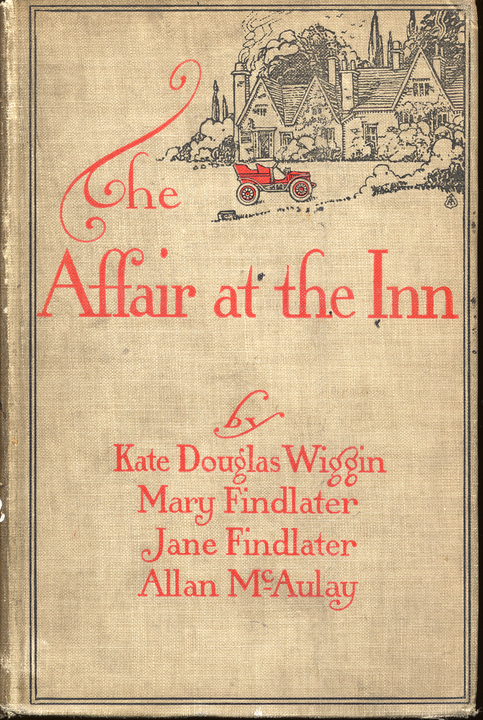
Cover of "Affair at the Inn" published in 1904 by Houghton, Mifflin and Company.

== Career ==
Findlater wrote novels and poetry both alone and together with her sister Jane. The sisters made two literary tours of the United States one in 1905. They collaborated with American writer Kate Douglas Wiggin, and were acquainted with Henry James, Ellen Terry, and Mary Chomondeley. Their best-known and most widely admired collaboration is the novel Crossriggs (1908), re-issued in 1986 by Virago Press. Her heroines are "surprisingly modern", often rejecting the expected path of marriage and motherhood, and preferring female companionship, care responsibilities, or a life in the arts.

== Personal life ==
Findlater moved with her mother and sisters to Prestonpans after Rev. Findlater's death in 1886. They also lived in Devon, for their mother's health, and in 1925 built a house in Rye, Roundel Gate, Military Road, designed by Horace Field. They returned to Perthshire during World War II. Mary Findlater lived all her life with her sister Jane, until Jane died in 1946. Mary Findlater died in 1963, at St. Fillans. Her grave is in Comrie.

== Selected bibliography ==
- Songs and Sonnets (1895)
- Over the Hills (1897)
- Betty Musgrave (1899)
- A Narrow Way (1901)
- Tales that are Told (1901, with Jane Findlater)
- The Rose of Joy (1903)
- The Affair at the Inn (1904, with Jane Findlater, Kate Douglas Wiggin, and Allan McAulay)
- A Blind Bird's Nest (1907)
- Crossriggs (1908, with Jane Findlater)
- Robinetta (1911, with Jane Findlater, Kate Douglas Wiggin, and Allan McAulay)
- Penny Monypenny (1911, with Jane Findlater)
- Tents of a Night (1914)
- Seen and Heard Before and After 1914 (1916, with Jane Findlater)
- Content with Flies (1916, with Jane Findlater)
- Beneath the Visiting Moon (1923, with Jane Findlater)
