= Kingshouse railway station =

Former railway station in Scotland

Kingshouse

General information
- Location: Balquhidder, Stirling (district); Scotland
- Coordinates: 56.35500°N 4.32277°W
- Platforms: 1

Other information
- Status: Disused

History
- Original company: Callander and Oban Railway
- Pre-grouping: Callander and Oban Railway operated by Caledonian Railway

Key dates
- 21 June 1871: Opened as Kingshouse
- 1 July 1931: Renamed Kingshouse Platform
- 28 September 1965: Effective closure date
- 1 November 1965: Official closure date
Location

Kingshouse was a railway station located at the hamlet of Kingshouse, Stirling where the road from Balquhidder joins the A84. The only building of note locally to the station was the Kingshouse Hotel. In 2013 it was refurbished and opened under new management as the Mhor 84 Hotel.

== History ==
This station opened on 21 June 1871 with a single platform on the east side of the line. It was closed on 28 September 1965 following a landslide in Glen Ogle.

Preceding station	Historical railways	Following station
Strathyre	Callander and Oban Railway	Balquhidder

== Sources ==
- Butt, R. V. J. (October 1995). The Directory of Railway Stations: details every public and private passenger station, halt, platform and stopping place, past and present (1st ed.). Sparkford: Patrick Stephens Ltd. ISBN 978-1-85260-508-7. OCLC 60251199. OL 11956311M.
- Jowett, Alan (March 1989). Jowett's Railway Atlas of Great Britain and Ireland: From Pre-Grouping to the Present Day (1st ed.). Sparkford: Patrick Stephens Ltd. ISBN 978-1-85260-086-0. OCLC 22311137.
