= Dalchonzie =

Coordinates: 56.378042°N 4.037289°W

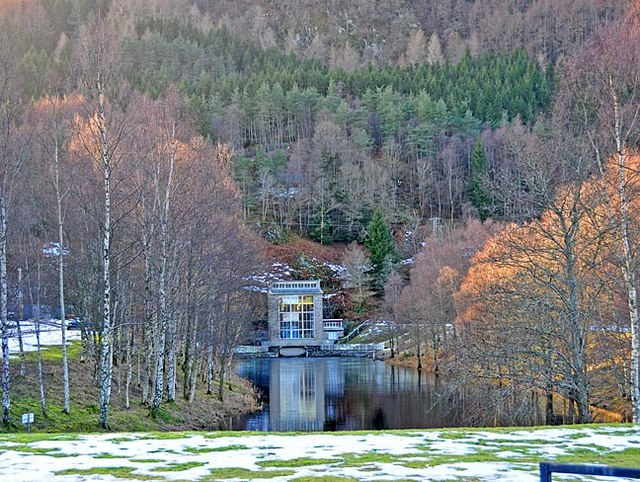
Dalhonzie power station outfow, power station in the background

Dalchonzie is a place by the river Earn in Perthshire. Buildings there include a country house, a hydro-electric power station and farms. From 1903 to 1951 Dalchonzie Halt railway station served this rural area. The old signal box at the station still survives as part of a private dwelling.
