= Jane Findlater =

Scottish novelist

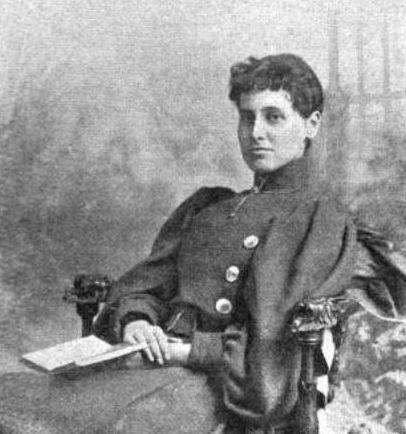
- In The Bookman, July 1896
- Born: Jane Helen Findlater; 4 November 1866; Edinburgh, Scotland
- Died: 20 May 1946 (aged 79); Comrie, Scotland
- Occupation: Writer

Jane Helen Findlater (4 November 1866 – 20 May 1946) was a Scottish novelist whose first book, The Green Graves of Balgowrie, started a successful literary career: for her sister Mary as well as for herself. They are known for their collaborative works of fiction as well as their own individual writing. Sometimes they are referred to as the Findlater sisters.

== Life ==
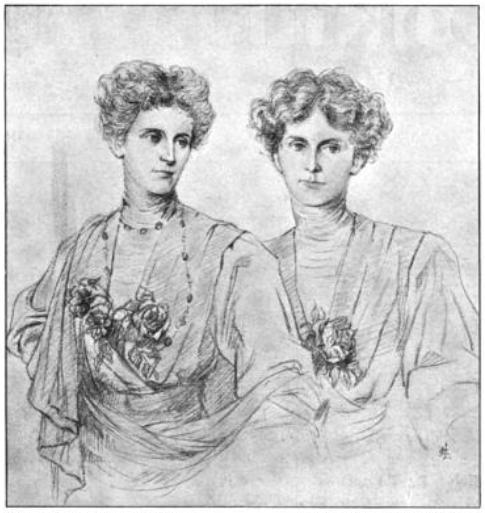
Drawing of Jane and Mary Findlater by Lady Jane Lindsay

Jane Findlater was born in Edinburgh but the first twenty years of her life were spent in Lochearnhead where her father was minister of the Free Church of Scotland. The family were not well-off, life at the manse was conservative, and the sisters' life was rather restricted. Their close relationship was of great importance to them, and continued for their entire lives. They were taught by governesses, including Annie Lorrain Smith before she trained as a botanist, listened to stories told by family, friends and servants, and started writing from an early age, both together and individually.

They moved to Prestonpans with their mother after their father died in 1886, and Jane and Mary tried to help the family finances by writing, while their older sister Sarah (Mora) worked as a nurse. It was ten years before Jane's book The Green Graves of Balgowrie, inspired by her mother's family history, struck a chord with both the general reader and the critics. It had been written on grocer's paper; its success brought both freedom from financial worry and also literary acclaim. After a few years they moved south in search of a warmer climate for their mother's health.

From then until the outbreak of World War I, the sisters published a series of novels, including their co-authored work, and two collaborations with Kate Douglas Wiggin and Allan McAulay (pseudonym of Charlotte Stewart). Their popularity led to a much wider circle of acquaintances, including friendship with Ellen Terry and Mary Cholmondeley. After meeting Henry James, they got to know his brother William and his sister-in-law Alice while on a lecture tour to the United States in 1905.

Both sisters' work shows an attention to the details of everyday life, including its pleasures, combined with a sense of the restricted opportunities for women in around the start of the 20th century Scotland. For them, marriage is not necessarily a happy ending. Jane's book The Ladder to the Stars (1906) was less well-received than The Green Graves, because of its focus on women's personal freedom. The heroine is "wholly absorbed in the cultivation of Self", according to one reviewer. Crossriggs (1908), often considered the sisters' best collaborative work, widely read in its day and republished in 1986, is just one of the books in which they reject "the idea that a single life is a wasted life". This nicely observed picture of village life, while telling stories of love, also explores "the lonely situation of an articulate and emotional woman" for whom marriage is not the answer.

In the 1920s their work seemed old-fashioned and Beneath the Visiting Moon (1923) was their last book. They moved from Devon to Rye in 1925 and built a house, Roundel Gate, Military Road, designed by Horace Field. In 1940, for World War II safety, they moved back to Perthshire.

Jane never married; the sisters would not consider being parted, joking that they could only consider marriage to a Mormon. Their writing in partnership is often considered their best work, outshining their individual novels.

== Selected works ==
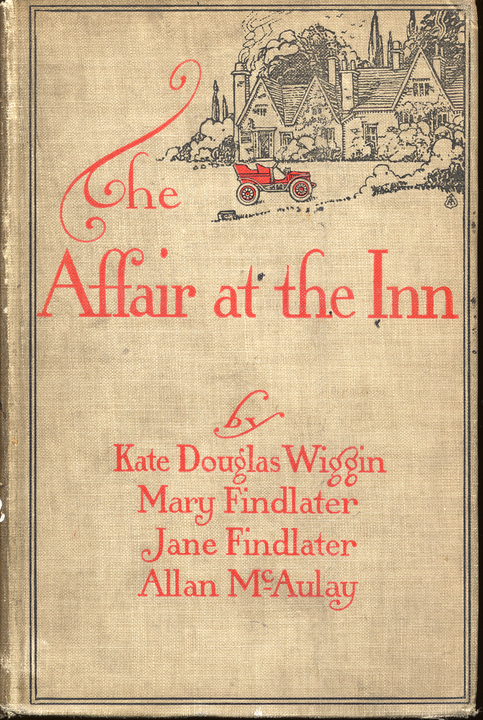
The Affair at the Inn has four different narrators. Jane Findlater writes from the viewpoint of Cecilia Evesham, a lady's companion to Mrs. McGill, whose first person narrative is by Mary Findlater.

- The Green Graves of Balgowrie (1896)
- A Daughter of Strife (1897)
- Rachel (1899)
- Tales that are Told (1901, with Mary Findlater)
- Zack, or The Story of a Mother (1902)
- Stones from a Glass House (1904)
- The Affair at the Inn (1904, with Mary Findlater, Kate Douglas Wiggin, and Allan McAulay)
- All That Happened in a Week (1905)
- The Ladder to the Stars (1906)
- Crossriggs (1908, with Mary Findlater)
- Robinetta (1911, with Mary Findlater, Kate Douglas Wiggin, and Allan McAulay)
- Penny Monypenny (1911, with Mary Findlater)
- Seven Scots Stories (1912)
- Seen and Heard Before and After 1914 (1916, with Mary Findlater)
- Content with Flies (1916, with Mary Findlater)
- A Green-Grass Widow, and Other Stories (1921)
- Beneath the Visiting Moon (1923, with Mary Findlater)

== Sources ==
- Bette London, Writing Double: Women's Literary Partnerships (Cornell 1999)
- Oxford Companion to Edwardian Fiction 1900-14: New Voices in the Age of Uncertainty, ed.Kemp, Mitchell, Trotter (OUP 1997)
- Jane Eldridge Miller, in the Oxford Dictionary of National Biography
