= Clan Macnab =

Highland Scottish clan

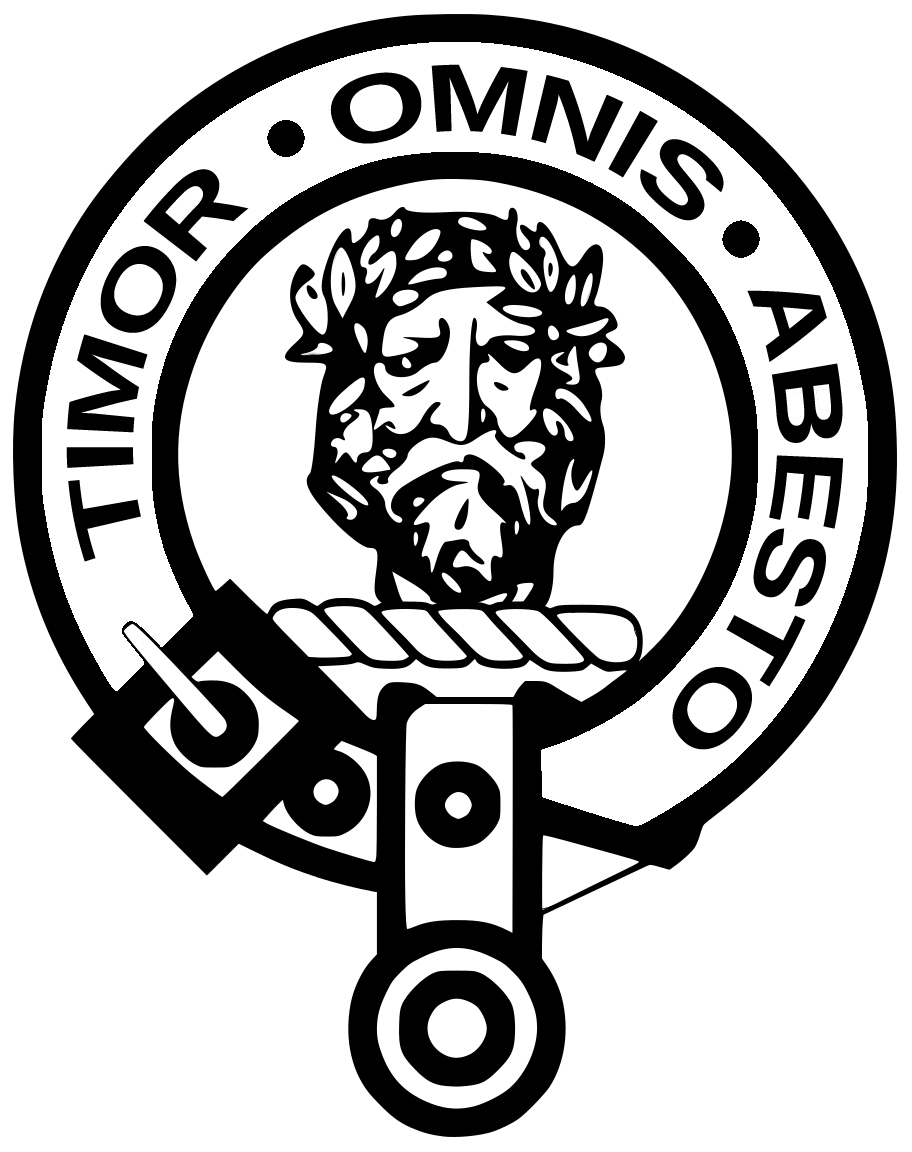
- Crest: The head of a savage affrontée Proper
- Motto: Timor Omnis Abesto (Let fear be far from all): Commonly misspelled as Ommis.

Profile
- Plant badge: Stone bramble or common heath

Chief
- James William Archibald Macnab of Macnab
- 24th Chief of Clan Macnab.
- Historic seat: MacNab Castle
Septs of Clan Macnab
Abbot, Abbott, Abbotson, Cleland, Dewar, Gilfillan, Gillan, Maclellan, Macandeoir, MacNair, McLelland
Allied clans
Clan Mackinnon
Clan MacGregor
Rival clans
Clan Neish

Clan Macnab is a Highland Scottish clan who were traditionally based around the coast of Loch Tay, a large ribbon lake in the southern Highlands. Notably their traditional burial ground is on Inchbuie island at the Falls of Dochart and castle is near the town of Killin.

== History ==
=== Origins of the clan ===
==== Traditional origins ====
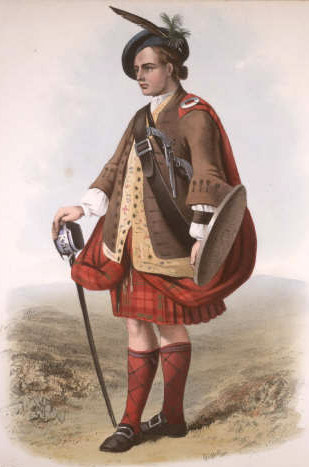
A romanticised Victorian-era illustration of a Clansman by R. R. McIan from The Clans of the Scottish Highlands published in 1845.

The name Macnab is derived from the Scottish Gaelic Mac An Aba, which means child of the abbot. According to tradition the progenitor of the clan was Abraruadh who was the Abbot of Glen Dochart and Strathearn. Abraruadh was allegedly a younger son of Kenneth MacAlpin, the first king of Scots. (See: Siol Alpin). Abraruadh was also descended from Fergus, king of Dál Riata and a nephew of Saint Fillan, who was the founder of the monastery in Glen Dochart in the seventh century.

==== Recorded origins ====
One of the earliest records of the Macnab family is on a charter of 1124. Malcolm de Glendochart appears in the Ragman Rolls of 1296 and submitted to Edward I of England.

=== 14th century and Robert the Bruce ===
Angus Macnab was brother-in-law of John III Comyn, Lord of Badenoch who was murdered by Robert the Bruce in 1306. Macnab then joined forces with the Clan MacDougall in their campaign against the Bruce when Bruce was nearly captured at the Battle of Dalrigh. When the Bruce's power consolidated after his victory at the Battle of Bannockburn in 1314, the Macnab lands were forfeited and their charters were destroyed.

The fortunes of the Clan Macnab were restored to some extent when Angus's grandson, Gilbert, received a charter from David II of Scotland in 1336. Gilbert was succeeded by his son, Sir Alexander Macnab, who died in about 1407.

=== 16th century and clan conflicts ===
Many battles were fought between the Clan Macnab and the Clan Neish. The last battle between them was the Battle of Glenboultachan where the Macnabs were victorious. The Neishes were killed almost to a man. However, some Neishes survived and continued to live on what they called Neish Island. The Neishes continued to plunder the neighbourhood and feuds continued.

=== 17th century and civil war ===
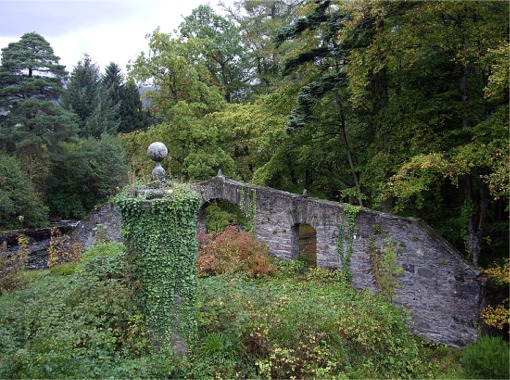
The MacNab burial ground on Inchbuie near Killin on the River Dochart

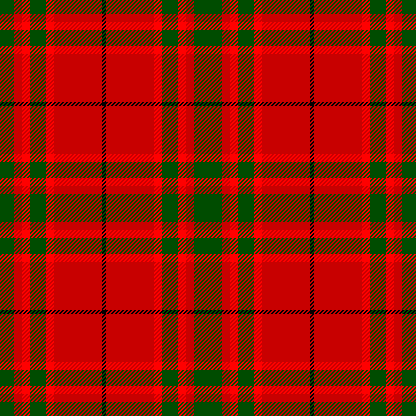
Maknabbis tartan, as published in 1842 in Vestiarium Scoticum.

Chief Finlay Macnab was a man of peace but protected his lands against the foraging royalist forces of James Graham, 1st Marquess of Montrose in the mid-1640s. However Finlay's son, who was known as Smooth John, did not follow his father's peaceful ways and actually joined forces with Montrose, contributing to the royal victory at the Battle of Kilsyth in 1645. Smooth John Macnab was appointed to garrison Montrose's own Kincardine Castle. General David Leslie, Lord Newark subsequently laid siege to the castle. The castle's whole garrison however, managed break through the Covenanter lines and fought their way clear, but John Macnab was captured. He was taken to Edinburgh and sentenced to death but escaped on the eve of his execution. He went on to lead three hundred of his clansmen at the Battle of Worcester in 1651.

On 13 July 1680 the Chief of Clan Macnab and his followers fought at the Battle of Altimarlach in support of Sir John Campbell of Glenorchy and against George Sinclair of Keiss, in a dispute over who had the right to the lands and title of the Earl of Caithness. Campbell won a decisive victory in the battle, but Sinclair later turned to the law and was awarded the title and the lands as Earl of Caithness.

=== 18th century and Jacobite risings ===
Robert Macnab, the fourteenth chief of Clan Macnab married a sister of John Campbell, 1st Earl of Breadalbane and Holland. This connection to the Clan Campbell constrained him from supporting the Jacobites in the rising of 1715, although many of his clansmen did take part. The fifteenth chief was a major in the Hanoverian government army and was captured at the Battle of Prestonpans in 1745. He was then held prisoner in Doune Castle.

== Clan Chief ==
Traditionally descended from Abraruadh, the Abbot of Glen Dochart, younger son of Kenneth Mac Alpin, first king of Scots.

Chieftain position passes father to child unless otherwise noted.

- 1st Chief: Gilbert McNab (a 1336)
- 2nd Chief: Alexander McNab
- 3rd Chief: John McNab (a 1407)
- 4th Chief: Finlay McNab (a 1450)
- 5th Chief: Patrick McNab (a 1483)
- 6th Chief: Finlay McNab (a 1487)
- 7th Chief: John McNab (a 1499)
- 8th Chief: Finlay McNab (d 13 April 1525)
- 9th Chief: John McNab (d Bef 10 Jul 1558)
- 10th Chief: Finlay McNab (d 1573)
- 11th Chief: Alexander McNab, brother of 10th (d bef Nov 1601)
- 12th Chief: Finlay McNab (d aft Jul 1656)
- 13th Chief: Alexander McNab (d bef Aug 1683)
- 14th Chief: Robert McNab (1665-1725)
- 15th Chief: John McNab (1698- 19 Feb 1778)
- 16th Chief: Francis McNab (1734-1816). Dvp
- 17th Chief: Archibald McNab (Nephew of 16th)
- 18th Chief: Sarah Ann MacNab (-1894). dvp.
- 19th Chief: James William MacNab (1831–1915). Cousin of the 18th.
- 20th Chief: James Frederick MacNab (a 1915)
- 21st Chief (de jure): James Alexander McNab (-1990). Resigned in favor of his uncle.
- 22nd Chief (de facto): Archibald Corrie McNab (a 1954 -1970), uncle of the 21st.
- 23rd Chief: James Charles Macnab of Macnab, in 2013., (14 April 1926-11 Jan 2013) son of the 21st.
- 24th Chief: James “Jamie” William McNab, (a 2013–present)

== See also ==
- Scottish clan
