= McNeish =

McNeish is a surname. Notable people with the surname include:

- Cameron McNeish, British mountain climber and writer
- James McNeish (born 1931), New Zealand writer
- Pete Shelley (born Peter Campbell McNeish, 1955-2018), English singer and founding member of Buzzcocks
- Bob McNeish (1912–1999), American football player and coach

== See also ==
- McNeish, New Brunswick, unincorporated community in Canada
- Neish
