= Lochearnhead, St Fillans and Comrie Railway =

Former railway line in Scotland

Overview
- Locale: Scotland
- Dates of operation: 6 August 1897–31 July 1902
- Successor: Caledonian Railway

Technical
- Track gauge: 4 ft 8 1/2 in (1,435 mm)

The Lochearnhead, St Fillans and Comrie Railway company was formed to build a line along the valley of Strathearn, closing the gap between the Callander and Oban line of the Caledonian Railway and Crieff. Tourism was on the increase in the area, and there were ambitious ideas that imported goods traffic at Oban would be routed to the eastern Scotland towns and cities over the line.

The route was opened in stages between 1901 and 1905; raising finance was a serious difficulty, but in the end the Caledonian Railway took over.

The through goods traffic never materialised and the tourist trade never provided enough income for the line to be profitable. It closed in 1951.

== History ==
=== Before the railway ===
The large tract of country in the Western Highlands of Scotland was penetrated by the Callander and Oban Railway which intended to open up the area and regenerate the port of Oban. They found the cost of construction stretched their financial resources much further than they imagined, but the line was opened in stages, reaching a Killin station at Glenoglehead in 1871, and finally reaching Oban in 1880. As well as the ordinary commercial traffic of the districts served, tourism became a significant seasonal source of income, and the attractive scenery became the focus of great interest.

To the east of Strathearn, Crieff had been reached much earlier by the Crieff Junction Railway, in 1856, connecting the town, which was the second most populous in Perthshire, in 1856. A second rail connection from Perth via Methven, the Crieff and Methven Junction Railway, opened in 1867. The line was extended a few miles west to Comrie when the Crieff and Comrie Railway opened in 1893. This improved the commercial activity of Comrie, and encouraged tourist exploration of Strathearn by road, using Comrie as a railhead. However the remaining gap of 15 miles (22 km) between Comrie and Lochearnhead proved an attraction to those who proposed railways, and a number of ideas that foresaw extraordinary business potential if the Callander and Oban line were connected to Crieff: transatlantic goods traffic would, it was claimed, be landed at Oban and conveyed to the eastern side of Scotland over such a line.

=== Authorisation ===
Lochearnhead, St. Fillans and Comrie Railway Act 1897
- Act of Parliament
- Parliament of the United Kingdom
- Long title: An Act for incorporating the Lochearnhead St. Fillans and Comrie Railway Company and authorising the Construction of a Railway from Lochearnhead to Comrie in the County of Perth and for other purposes.
- Citation: 60 & 61 Vict. c. ccxix

Dates
- Royal assent: 6 August 1897

Text of statute as originally enacted

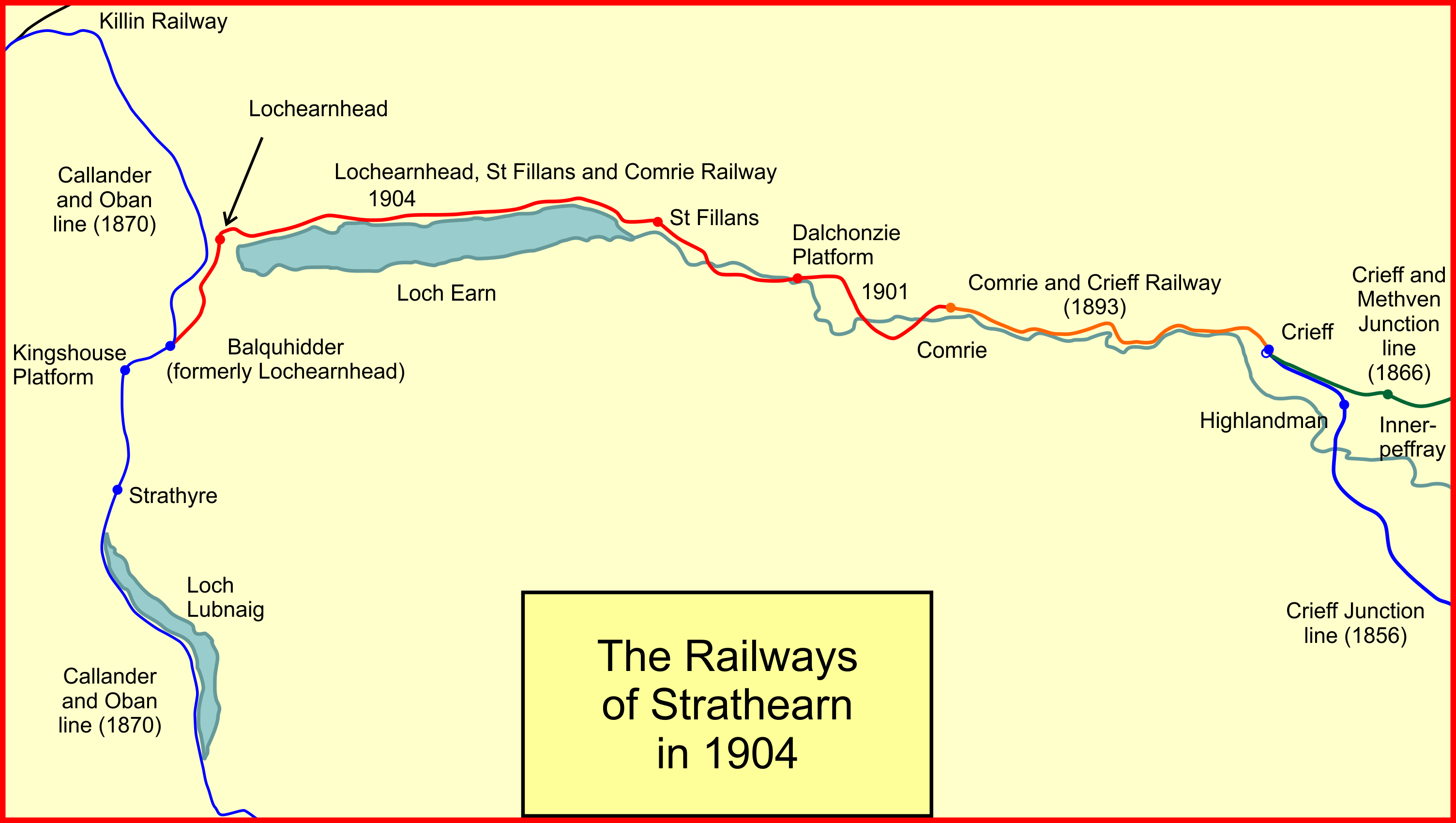
The railways of Strathearn in 1904

The proposals came to fruition when the Lochearnhead, St Fillans and Comrie Railway was authorised by act of Parliament, the Lochearnhead, St. Fillans and Comrie Railway Act 1897 (60 & 61 Vict. c. ccxix), on 6 August 1897. The share capital was £165,000. The Caledonian Railway subscribed half the money on the basis that it would later have the option of absorbing the company. The Caledonian was concerned by the possibility of the rival North British Railway building a penetrating line into the area, or even taking over the unbuilt St Fillans line, and this motivated their provision of funding. The new company was slow to take action on its new powers, and it was not until February 1899 that a prospectus, inviting investment, was issued. The prospectus emphasised the potential of through traffic from the West Highlands to Perth and other central and eastern destinations; cattle was a particularly dominant traffic to be expected.

Considerable attention was given to the environmental impact of the line through high amenity landscape: a parliamentary committee considered the matter.

=== Construction ===
The work proceeded to construct the railway from Comrie to St Fillans. By 8 June 1901 it was ready for Colonel von Donop of the Board of Trade to examine the line for approval of opening. This was satisfactory and on 12 September 1901 there was a ceremonial opening of the line. However all the money the company had for construction had been exhausted. There still remained the major part of the line to be built. The Caledonian Railway had advanced a large part of the capital of the company, and independent subscriptions were minimal. The company appealed to the Caledonian to take over the construction, and while this was an unwelcome situation, the Caledonian Railway agreed to do so. Meanwhile, the ordinary public train service commenced on 1 October 1901, over two weeks after the opening ceremony. There were three trains daily.

=== Absorbed by the Caledonian ===
The deed of agreement to sell the company to the Caledonian Railway was executed on 7 May 1901, and it took effect, after approval by the Caledonian Railway Act 1902 (2 Edw. 7. c. cxlvi), on 1 August 1902. During the period awaiting the final approval, a contract was let for the extension to Lochearnhead, with Caledonian money. Unfortunately the contractor died suddenly during the construction, throwing the progress of the work into confusion. At length a new contractor was found to resume the works.

Finally on 15 June 1904 an inspection train was run from St Fillans to Lochearnhead, and the line opened for public passenger traffic on 1 July 1904. Goods trains started running on 18 July.

=== Balquhidder ===
When the Callander and Oban line had opened in 1870 there was a station named Lochearnhead. It was a considerable distance from the settlement after which it was named; in fact the line passed closer to Lochearnhead but high above it on the hillside, and remote from any public road. On the opening of the St Fillans line, a new Lochearnhead station was provided in the village, and the C&OR station was renamed Balquhidder.

At this stage there was still a gap from the new Lochearnhead to Balquhidder, and work continued in constructing that section of the line. It was announced that the final link would open on 1 May 1905, and an inaugural train from Aberdeen to Oban was planned, reflecting the continuing hope that a new east-west traffic would be generated. In fact the Board of Trade inspection was not able to be carried out until 2 May and the special passenger train could not be run. (Note: Byrom's text is confusing on this point: "The final stretch of line did not open until 1st May 1905, the day before the official Board of Trade inspection... There was no formal opening ceremony and, because the line had not yet been inspected, a planned inaugural excursion train from Aberdeen to Oban ... had to be re-routed via Dunblane and Callander." Thomas and Turnock give 1 May 1905 (on page 315).)

The junction station at Balquhidder was relocated about 170 yards (155 m) west of its former location; it was provided with 800 feet (244 m) long platforms. The branch faced south here; this was considered a disadvantage in the light of the intended Oban traffic. An 1897 plan prepared for the line had shown the line from St Fillans turning north and joining the Oban line nearer Killin Junction station, but this was abandoned.

=== World War I ===
In common with numerous stations on the Caledonian Railway system, Lochearnhead station was closed as an economy measure between 1 January 1917 and 1 February 1919.

=== Closure and current use ===
The thinly populated area brought little traffic to the railway and tourist traffic declined also in the middle decades of the 20th century. The rise of motor buses accelerated the loss of passenger business, and on 1 October 1951 the line closed between Balquhidder and Comrie. However the track remained in situ until 1959 as the line was used sporadically throughout the 1950s to transport materials to the Glen Lednock hydro-electric schemes under construction in the area.

A short section of the line between Balquhidder station and Lochearnhead has been converted into a cycle path, forming part of National Cycle Route 7 and the Rob Roy Way; both use much of the old Callander and Oban Railway trackbed along their routes between Drymen and Pitlochry. In 2001, the Kendrum viaduct was refurbished in connection with improvements to the cycle path, including the replacement of a missing steel span over the river.

As part of the Loch Earn Railway Path project, the section between Dalchonzie Halt and St Fillans now forms a section of a cycle route, with the reopening of a tunnel to the west of the village taking place in 2017. Further phases are planned to create a cycle path between St Fillans and Lochearnhead by using much of trackbed between the two villages.

Most of the stations along the route have now been converted into caravan parks, with the exception of Lochearnhead station, which has been restored by Hertfordshire Scouts.

== Topography ==
The line was constructed with the expectation of handling heavy through traffic and the structures were designed accordingly. Some of the shorter and moderate span bridges were constructed with in-situ concrete, then popular as a building material in the remoter areas.

The line climbed steadily from Comrie to St Fillans with a stiff section of 1 in 60 approaching that place. After St Fillans the route was undulating, but with equally severe ruling gradients, and the final section from Lochearnhead to Balquhidder also had a section of continuous 1 in 60 rising.

The line opened from Comrie to St Fillans on 1 October 1901, and from St Fillans to Lochearnhead on 1 July 1904; finally from Lochearnhead to Balquhidder on 1 May 1905. The line closed on 1 October 1951 except for the subsequent intermittent use for the Glen Lednock catchment scheme.

The stations were:

- Comrie; opened by the Crieff and Comrie Railway on 1 June 1893, and closed 6 July 1964;
- Dalchonzie Platform; opened 1 September 1903, later renamed Dalchonzie Halt;
- St Fillans;
- Lochearnhead; closed 1 January 1917; reopened 6 January 1919;
- Balquhidder; station on the Callander and Oban section, originally named Lochearnhead and opened on 1 June 1870; renamed Balquhidder in 1904; relocated and extended station was opened on 1 May 1905; remained open after closure of the St Fillans line and finally closed 28 September 1965.

== Notes ==
=== Sources ===
- Awdry, Christopher (1990). Encyclopaedia of British Railway Companies. Sparkford: Patrick Stephens Ltd. ISBN 1-8526-0049-7. OCLC 19514063. CN 8983.
- Jowett, Alan (March 1989). Jowett's Railway Atlas of Great Britain and Ireland: From Pre-Grouping to the Present Day (1st ed.). Sparkford: Patrick Stephens Ltd. ISBN 978-1-85260-086-0. OCLC 22311137.
- Sanders, Keith; Hodgins, Douglas (1998). British Railways Past and Present No 31 - North West Scotland (1st ed.). Great Addington, Kettering, Northants: Past & Present. ISBN 1-8589-5090-2. OCLC 41019274.
- Sanders, Keith; Hodgins, Douglas (2001). British Railways Past and Present No 31 - North West Scotland (Revised ed.). Great Addington, Kettering, Northants: Past & Present. ISBN 1-8589-5090-2. OCLC 54022071.
