= Neish =

Neish is a name of Scottish origin. Clan Neish (or MacNeish) is a sept of either Clan Gregor or Clan Innes.

== People with the name ==
- Arthur Charles Neish, late Canadian plant biologist and Fellow of the Royal Society of London
- Bruce Neish, former Australian rules footballer
- Clan Neish*

== Places with the name ==
- Neish Island

== See also ==
- McNeish
- MacNeish
