= Stùc a' Chroin =

Mountain of the southern Scottish Highlands

Coordinates: 56.32872°N 4.23826°W

- Stùc a' Chrodhain
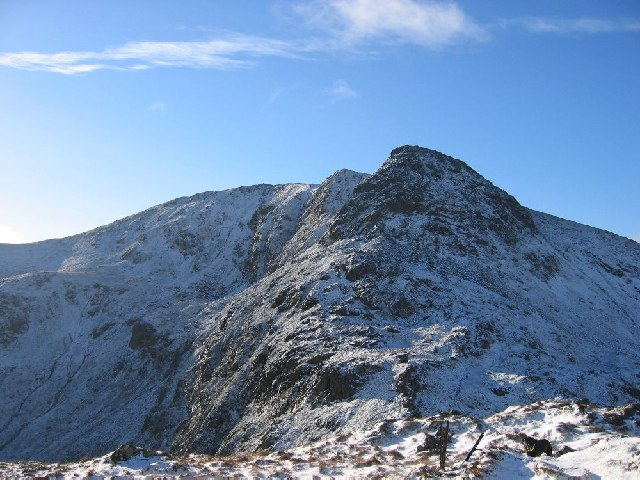
- Northern ridge of Stùc a' Chroin, November 2004

Highest point
- Elevation: 975 m (3,199 ft)
- Prominence: 252 m (827 ft)
- Parent peak: Ben Vorlich
- Listing: Munro, Marilyn

Naming
- English translation: cloven hoof peak
- Language of name: Gaelic
- Pronunciation: Scottish Gaelic: [ˈs̪t̪uːxk ə ˈxɾɔɲ]

Geography
- Location: Perth and Kinross/Stirling, Scotland
- Parent range: Grampian Mountains
- OS grid: NN617174
- Topo map: OS Landranger 57

Stùc a' Chroin (Scottish Gaelic: Stùc a' Chrodhain, 'cloven hoof peak') (also translated as 'hill of the little sheepfold' or 'peak of danger') is a mountain in the Breadalbane region of the southern Scottish Highlands. It is a Munro, with a height of 975 metres (3,199 ft). It lies a short distance south of Ben Vorlich and east of Strathyre. The boundary between the council areas of Perth and Kinross and Stirling passes through the summit of the peak, and the town of Callander lies to the south.

Stùc a' Chroin is most often climbed together with Ben Vorlich from Ardvorlich on Loch Earnside to the north. The normal routes of ascent is over the summit of Ben Vorlich and down its south west ridge to the Bealach an Dubh Choirein. From this bealach a series of rough paths cut very steeply up the right side of the prominent buttress, involving scrambling, to the summit of Stùc a' Chroin. Returning from the bealach, Ben Vorlich can be skirted utilising a faint, boggy path traversing the grassy slopes on its north west, eventually re-joining the initial ascent path.

An alternative is from Ardchullarie on Loch Lubnaig up the forest path to the head of Glen Ample and over Beinn Each, a Corbett. The linking ridge is very rough and rocky. On return, the open west slopes of Beinn Each can be descended, encountering the remarkable eggbox terrain of a large rock slope failure (see Lochearnhead, Glen Ample)

A longer, unfrequented route of ascent to Stùc a' Chroin from Arivurichardich ascends the mountain's south east ridge.
