= Neish Island =

Island in Perth and Kinross, Scotland

Coordinates: 56°23′32″N 4°7′18″W

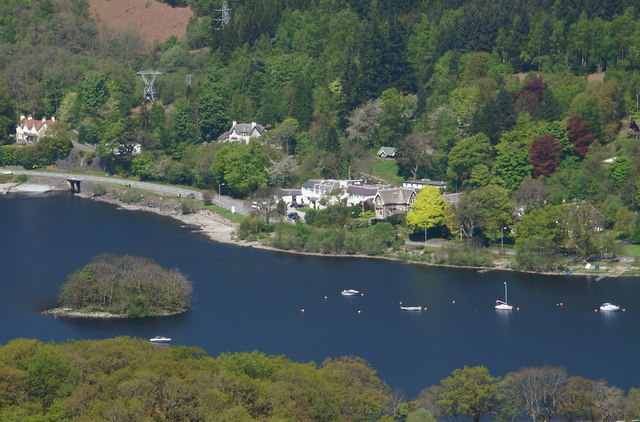
Neish Island on Loch Earn. Traditionally the island was the stronghold of the Clan Neish. The ruins of their small fort are on the Island.

Neish Island is an island in Loch Earn, Scotland.

== History ==
It is recorded that in 1490 James IV of Scotland ordered Lord Drummond to cast down the house of the Ester (eastern) Isle of Loch Ern (Neish Island) and destroy all the strengths of the same and take away the boat and put it at the Wester (western) Isle. The Neishes apparently had the only boat on the loch and although the dwelling was demolished the Neishes repaired it and continued to live there, occupying most of the land near St Fillans and as far west as Tyndrum. The Neishes apparently took refuge on the island after being defeated by the Clan Macnab at the Battle of Glenboultachan in 1522. The Neishes or MacNeishes are regarded as a sept of the Clan Gregor. In a later part of the feud, in 1612, when the Neishes robbed the Macnabs, the Macnabs apparently took revenge by attacking the Neishes on the island, all of whom were killed except for one small boy who hid under a bed and from who all of the name Neish are allegedly descended. According to the New Statistical Account of Scotland there is a tradition that the Neishes or Nishes felt that they were safe from reprisals on the island because they had the only boat on the loch, but the Macnabs went to the effort of carrying their own boat on their shoulders and over the Grampian Mountains to get to the island. The Neishes had a small castle on the island and the ruins of it still remain, and the remnants of a little boat abandoned by the Macnabs on their way back over the hills were still seen into the early part of the 20th Century. The castle on the island consisted of a square keep, divided into chambers and constructed with thick walls. A small harbour and landing place for boats still exists on the east side of the island.
