= Edinample Castle =

Castle in Stirling, Scotland

Coordinates: 56.3755°N 4.2657°W

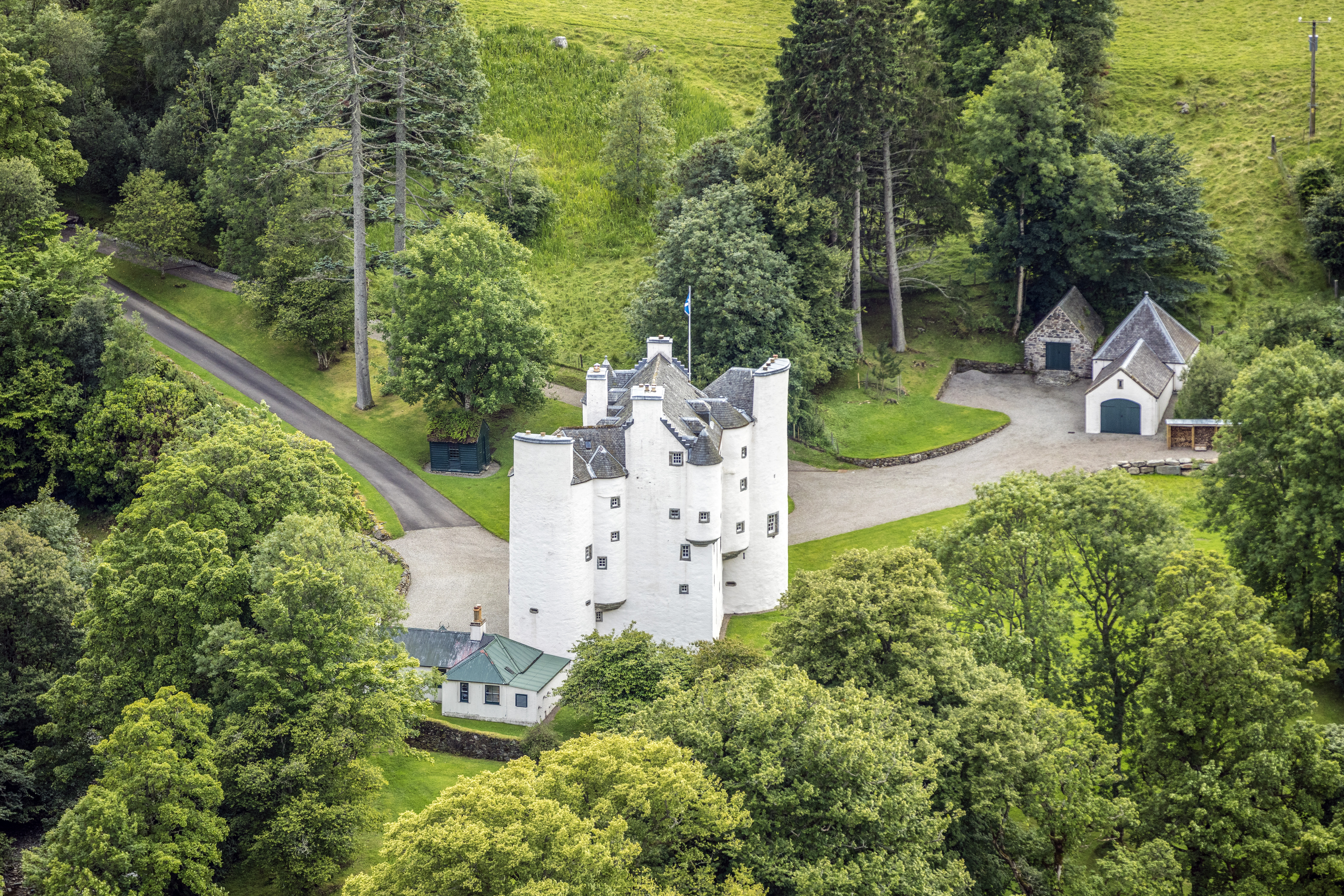
Aerial view of Edinample Castle

Edinample Castle is a late 16th-century tower house on the southern shores of Loch Earn near Balquhidder in the Stirling council area of Scotland. It was designated as a Category A listed building in 1971.

== History ==
The estate was granted to Colin Campbell, 6th Laird of Glenorchy in 1547 by Henry Stewart, 1st Lord Methven and his son, 'Black Duncan', Duncan Campbell of Glenorchy, (Donnchadh Dubh) probably built the castle in 1584.

== Description ==
The castle takes the form of a Z-plan tower house and most likely incorporates an earlier tower in its eastern side. The rectangular main block measures 43 by 27 feet (13.1 by 8.2 m) and is three storeys and an attic high. Circular bartizans are corbelled out at the north and south corners at the second-storey level. Four-storey round towers, roughly 23 feet (7.0 m) in diameter, are at the northwestern and southeastern corners. Circular stair towers are corbelled out at the first-storey level at the northern junctures with the main block.

The interior and the roofs were remodelled around 1790. Sometime during the 18th or 19th century a two-storey porch and stairway was built against the northern face of the castle. A single-storey U-plan corrugated-iron structure was erected in 1870 on the eastern side, probably as an office. In the early 20th century a five-storey addition was built, completely enclosing the southeastern tower. The castle fell into a state of dereliction by the 1960s, but it was renovated for use as a private family home from about 1968–1998 by a series of owners. As part of the remodelling, all of the external additions, except for the office, were demolished.
