= Loch Earn =

Loch in the southern Scottish Highlands

- Scottish Gaelic: Loch Èire
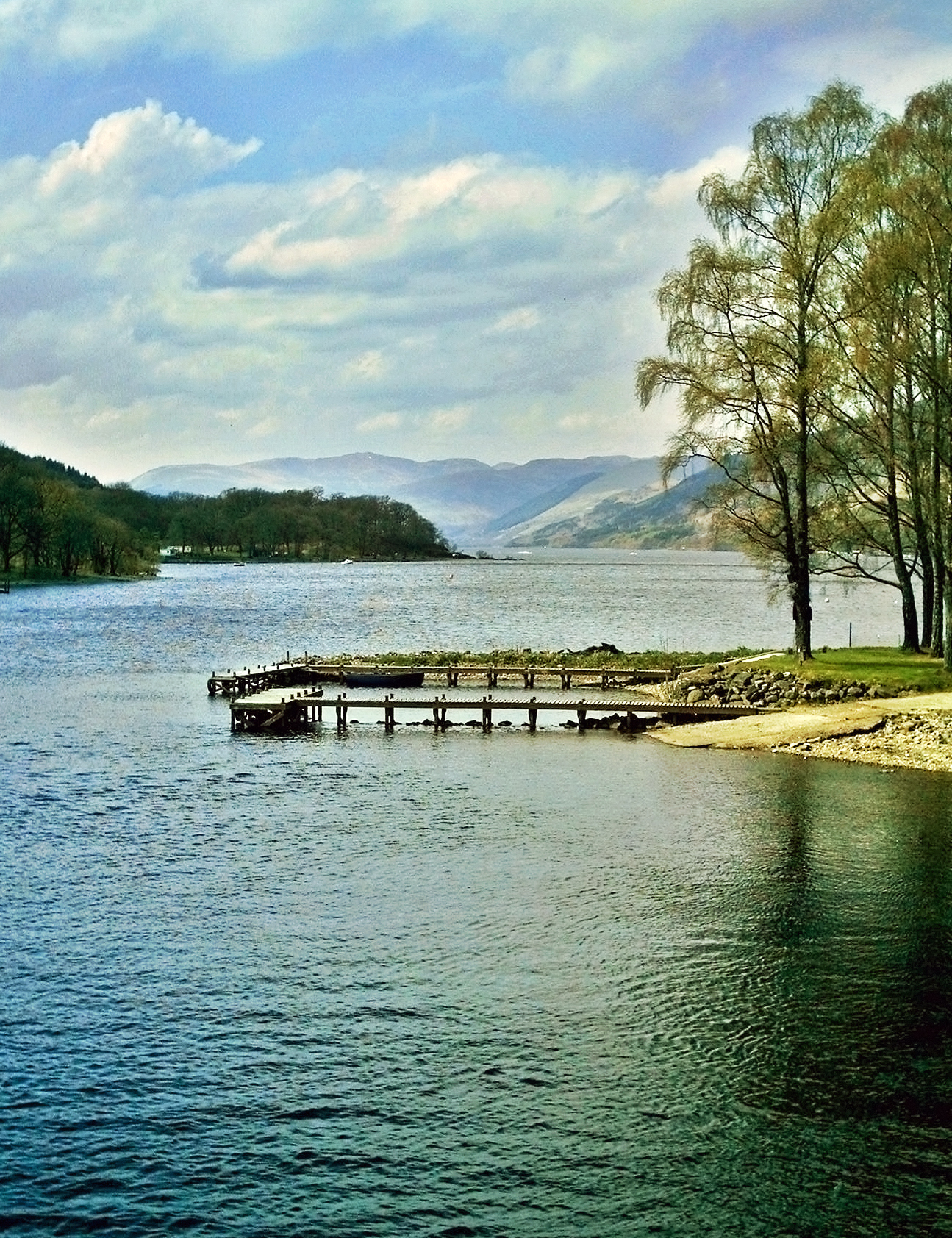

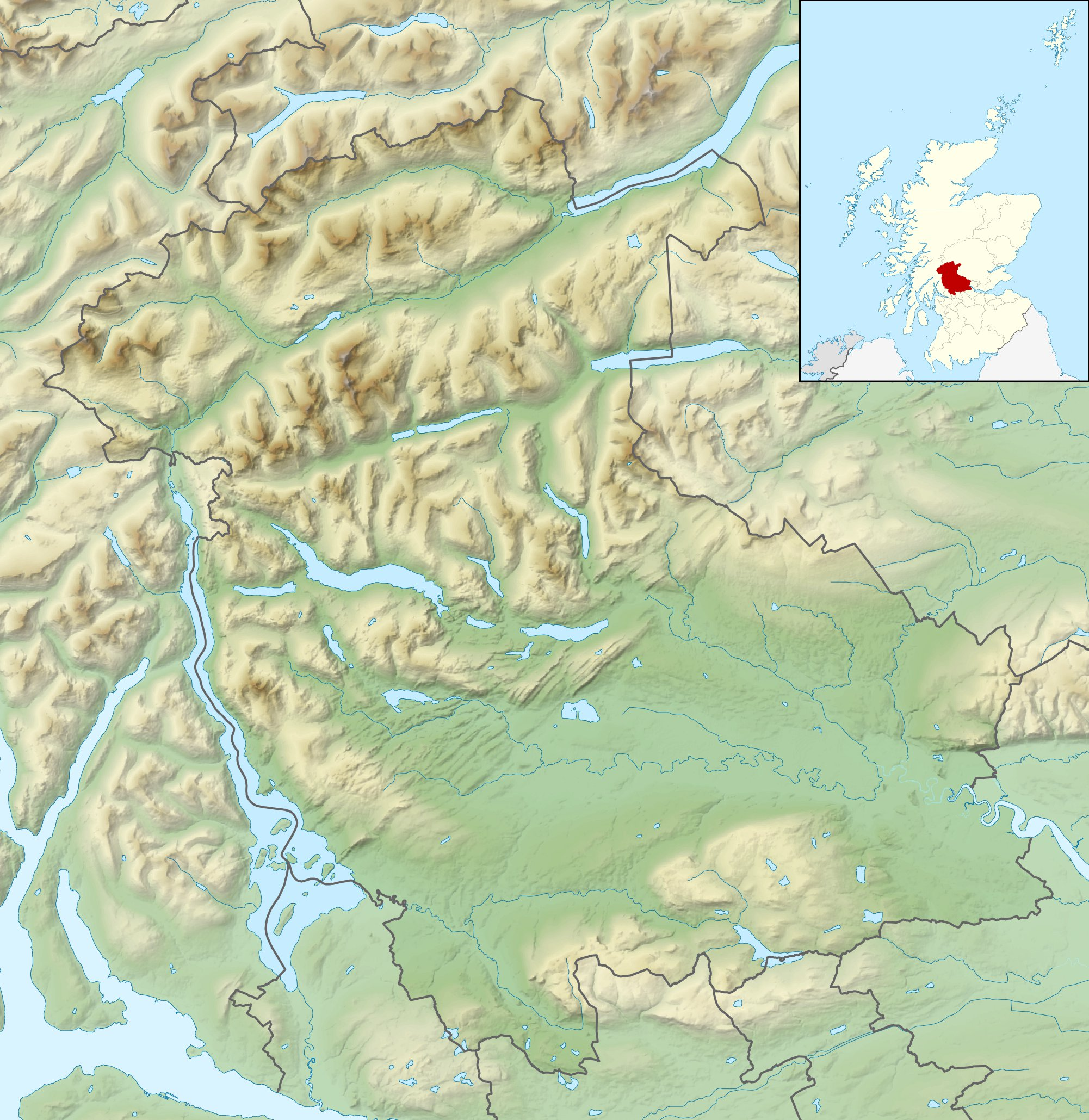
- Location within Stirling
- Location: Perth and Kinross, Scotland
- Coordinates: 56.3873°N 4.2025°W
- Type: Freshwater loch
- Primary outflows: River Earn
- Max. length: 10.46 km (6.50 mi)
- Max. width: 0.965 km (0.600 mi)
- Surface area: 946.7 ha (2,339 acres)
- Average depth: 138 ft (42 m)
- Max. depth: 287 ft (87 m)
- Shore length^{1}: 22.7 km (14.1 mi)
- Surface elevation: 97 m (318 ft)
- Islands: Neish Island
- Settlements: Lochearnhead St Fillans
- ^{1} Shore length is not a well-defined measure.

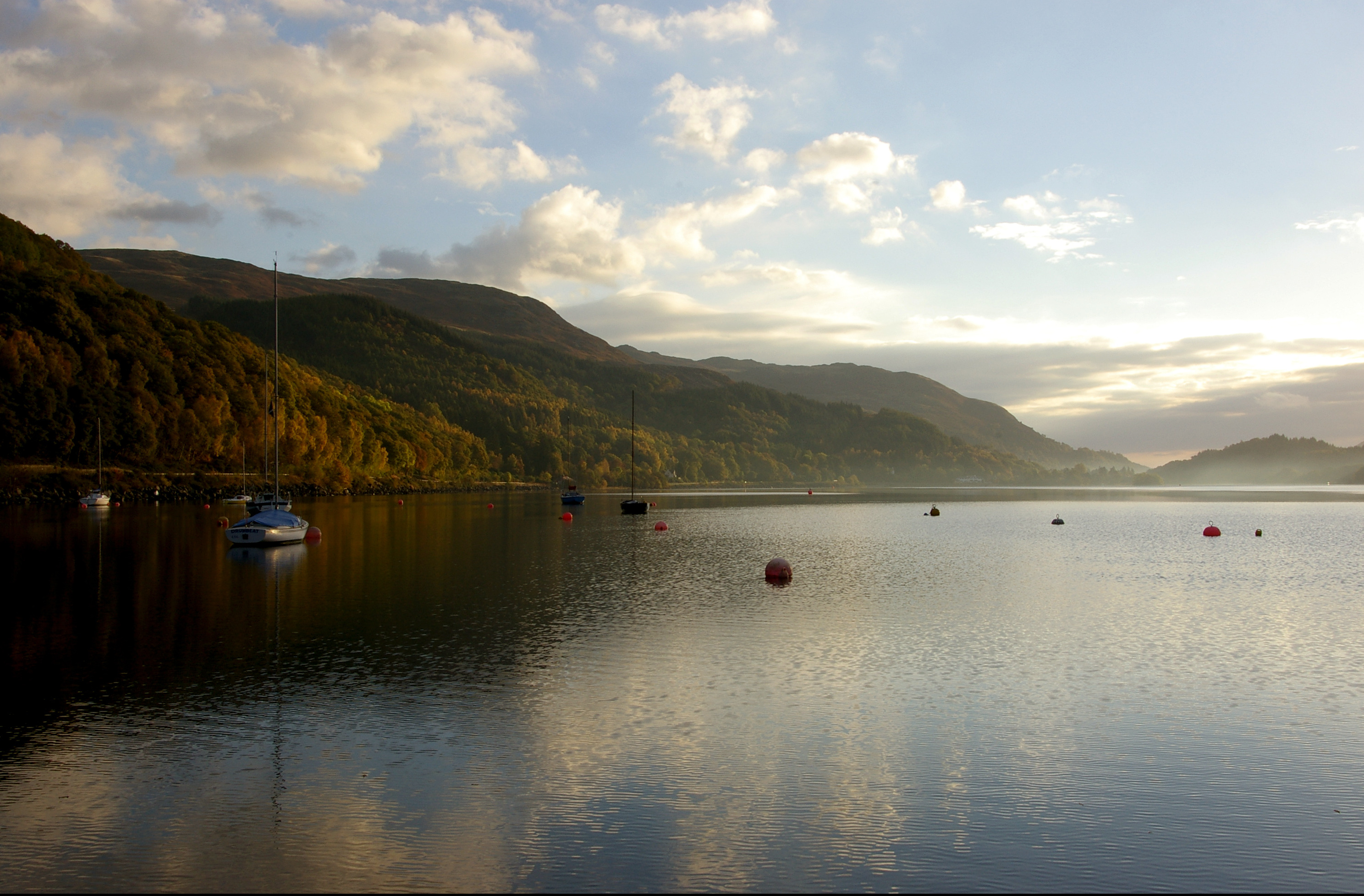
Loch Earn, looking towards St. Fillans

Loch Earn (Scottish Gaelic: Loch Èire or Loch Èireann) is a freshwater loch in the southern highlands of Scotland, in the districts of Perth and Kinross and Stirling.

The name literally means "Loch of Ireland", and it has been suggested that this might derive from the time when the Gaels were expanding their kingdom of Dál Riata eastwards into Pictland.

== Geography ==
It is a long narrow loch, 10 miles (16 km) west of Crieff and is approximately 7 miles (11 km) long, 3/4 mile (1.2 km) at its widest point (56.38N, 4.22W) and at its deepest point (approximately halfway along) about 285 feet (87 metres). Lochearnhead village is situated at the western end of the loch and St. Fillans village at the eastern end. From here, the River Earn flows eastwards from the loch, through Strathearn, and eventually joins the Firth of Tay some 50 miles (80 km) away. Lochearnhead is the centre for the water sports activities on the loch; water skiing, canoeing and sailing. The loch is also stocked regularly with brown and rainbow trout and fishing, by permit, is possible from the shore and by boat.

To the south of the loch lies Ben Vorlich, a steep sided pyramid shaped peak. At 3,232 feet (985 metres), this is a popular climb and the views from the top are spectacular. Just east of Lochearnhead, on the south side of the loch, is Edinample Castle, built by 'Black' Duncan Campbell of Glenorchy in 1584. Further east is Ardvorlich House, home to the Stewarts of Ardvorlich from 1580 (rebuilt in 1790).

Loch Earn is unusual in that it has its own apparent "tidal system", or seiche, caused by the action of the prevailing wind blowing along the loch. This wind pressure on the surface causes the water level to build up at one end of the loch. As with all damped mechanical systems, applied pressure can result in an oscillation, and the water will return to the opposite end of the loch over time. In the case of Loch Earn, this has a period of 16 hours and the effect can be measured, but is difficult to observe. The resulting currents can create complex turbulence patterns, as higher layers of warmer waters mix with the lower lying colder waters of the loch.

Other bodies of fresh water which experience this seiche effect include Lake Geneva, Lake Garda, the Great Lakes and Lake Baikal.

== Notable visitors ==
In August 1906, Edith Holden visited the Loch and while cycling along the North side observed "the finest Larches she had ever seen".

In October 1964, The Beatles stayed at The Four Seasons Hotel at St Fillans. They stayed in two of the chalets overlooking Loch Earn and also went boating on the loch.

== Sources ==
- David B. McNaughton, The History of Upper Strathearn, Jamieson & Munro (1988)
