= Ben Vorlich, Loch Earn =

Mountain in Scotland

Coordinates: 56.34254°N 4.21965°W

Ben Vorlich
- Beinn Mhùrlaig
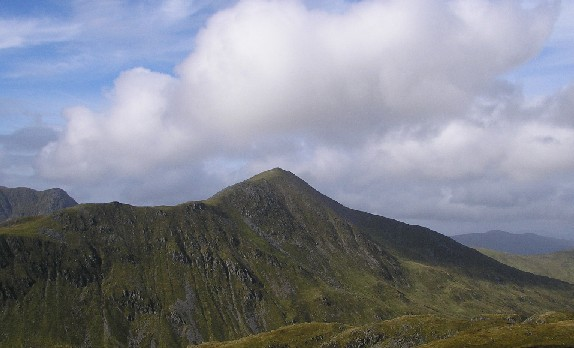
- Ben Vorlich seen from Meall na Feàrna to the southeast

Highest point
- Elevation: 985 m (3,232 ft)
- Prominence: c. 830 m Ranked 27th in British Isles
- Parent peak: Ben More
- Listing: Marilyn, Munro

Naming
- English translation: Hill of the bay
- Language of name: Gaelic
- Pronunciation: Gaelic [peɲ ˈvuːrˠl̪ˠɛkʲ]

Geography
- Location: Loch Earn, Scotland
- Parent range: Grampian Mountains
- OS grid: NN629189
- Topo map: OS Landranger 57

Ben Vorlich (Scottish Gaelic: Beinn Mhùrlaig) is a mountain in the Southern Highlands of Scotland. It lies south of Loch Earn and Ardvorlich, and a short distance north of the neighbouring mountain Stùc a' Chroin. Ben Vorlich reaches a height of 985 metres (3,232 ft), making it a Munro.

Due to its prominence when seen from the lower ground of the Central Belt, Ben Vorlich is one of the most commonly seen of Munros, Scotland's peaks of at least 3,000 ft (914.4 m) elevation. It lies in an area of land bounded to the north by Loch Earn and to the west by Loch Lubnaig. The town of Callander lies to the south.

Ben Vorlich is most frequently climbed from Ardvorlich to the north. A path leads up Glen Vorlich, and then heads for the mountain's northern ridge. The summit lies 4 km from Ardvorlich. Many walkers then continue on to the neighbouring mountain, Stùc a' Chroin, by way of Ben Vorlich's south west ridge. Return to Ardvorlich can be made without re-ascending Ben Vorlich, as a path leads from the bealach between the two hills round Ben Vorlich's northwestern slope to meet the main ascent path. Other possible routes from the southern side allow one to ascend Ben Vorlich by way of its southeastern ridge. This can be accessed either from Glen Artney to the southeast or Callander to the south.

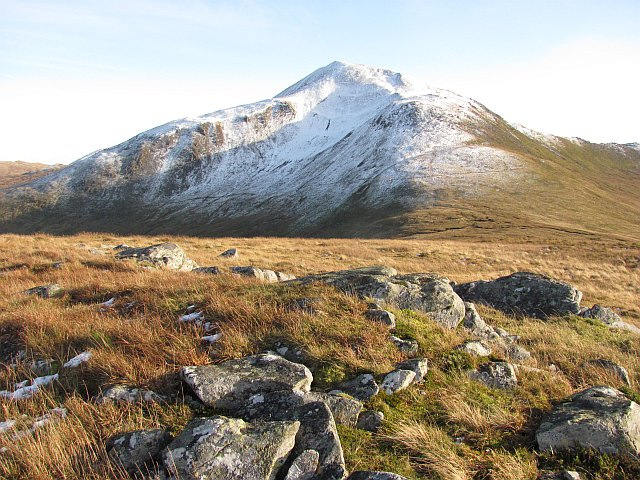
Ben Vorlich seen for Ben Our
