= St Fillans =

Coordinates: 56°23′27″N 4°06′44″W

St Fillans: Scottish Gaelic: Am Port Mòr; Scots: Meikle Port
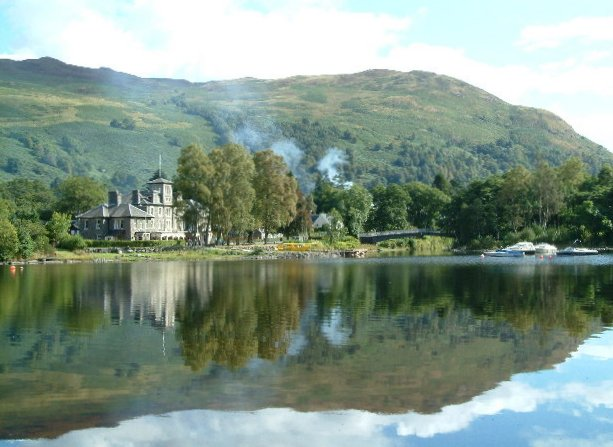
- St Fillans, from the southern bank of Loch Earn

- Location within Perth and Kinross
- Civil parish: Comrie
- Council area: Perth and Kinross
- Lieutenancy area: Perth and Kinross
- Country: Scotland
- Sovereign state: United Kingdom
- Post town: CRIEFF
- Postcode district: PH6
- Police: Scotland
- Fire: Scottish
- Ambulance: Scottish
- UK Parliament: Perth and Kinross-shire
- Scottish Parliament: Perth

St Fillans (Scottish Gaelic: Am Port Mòr) is a village in Perthshire in the central highlands of Scotland, in the council area of Perth and Kinross. The village lies at the eastern end of Loch Earn, 5 miles (8 km) west of Comrie on the A85 road, at the point where the River Earn leaves the loch. St Fillans was a small clachan in the 18th century, known as Port of Lochearn (Scottish Gaelic: Port Loch Èire), or Meikleport, which is a literal translation from the Gaelic name Am Port Mòr into Scots. In 1817 it was renamed St Fillans by Lord Gwydyr, the husband of Clementina Drummond, heiress to the Drummond Estate.

== Church ==
The pre-Reformation church, St Fillan's Chapel, whose kirkyard is the traditional burial place of the Stewarts of Ardvorlich, lies to the south of the River Earn, between St Fillans and the Iron Age Pictish hill fort of Dundurn. It is believed that the Irish missionary Saint Fillan lived on this hill. Not far from the foot of the hill is the Allt Ghoinean burn which is claimed to be the Gonan or Monan of Sir Walter Scott's poem The Lady of the Lake:

The stag at eve had drunk his fill, where danced the moon on Monan's rill.

== Electric power station ==
There is a large hydro-electric power station in St Fillans, fed from a dam at Loch Lednock high above the village. The power station, which forms part of the Breadalbane Hydro-Electric Scheme, is not visible within St Fillans as it is underground and was hewn from solid rock.

== Golf course ==
The golf course at St Fillans was created in 1903 by Willie Auchterlonie.

== River Earn ==
The section of the River Earn from St Fillans down to Comrie, along with much of the surrounding countryside, is designated as a national scenic area (NSA). It is one of 40 such areas in Scotland, which are defined to identify areas of exceptional scenery and to ensure its protection by restricting certain forms of development. The River Earn (Comrie to St Fillans) NSA covers 12 square miles (3,108 ha) in total.

== Rock of fairies ==
The village became the scene of controversy in November 2005 when a housing development was halted to avoid killing the fairies who allegedly lived under a rock on the proposed site. After some negotiation, the new housing estate was redesigned so that the rock in question was preserved, in a small park in the centre of the estate.

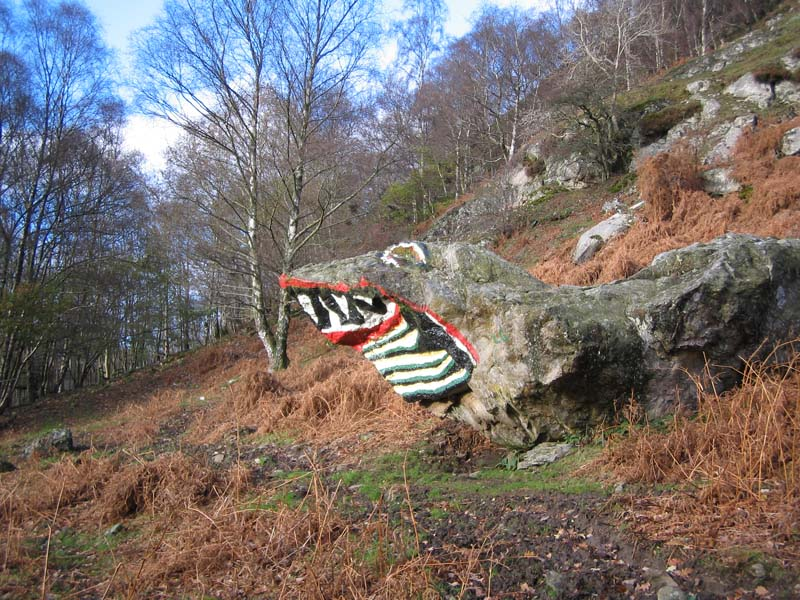
St Fillans dragon from the side

== Transport ==
=== Bus ===
==== Stagecoach ====
Stagecoach runs one route in the village. Services run towards Crieff and Perth.

==== Citylink ====
Citylink operate route 913 through the village. The route runs once a day in each direction and links Edinburgh (Twice a day) with Oban/Fort William (Once a day to each destination).

=== Road ===
On the A85 just to the east of St Fillans lies the St Fillans Dragon and the St Fillans Toad.
