= Long-distance footpaths in Scotland =

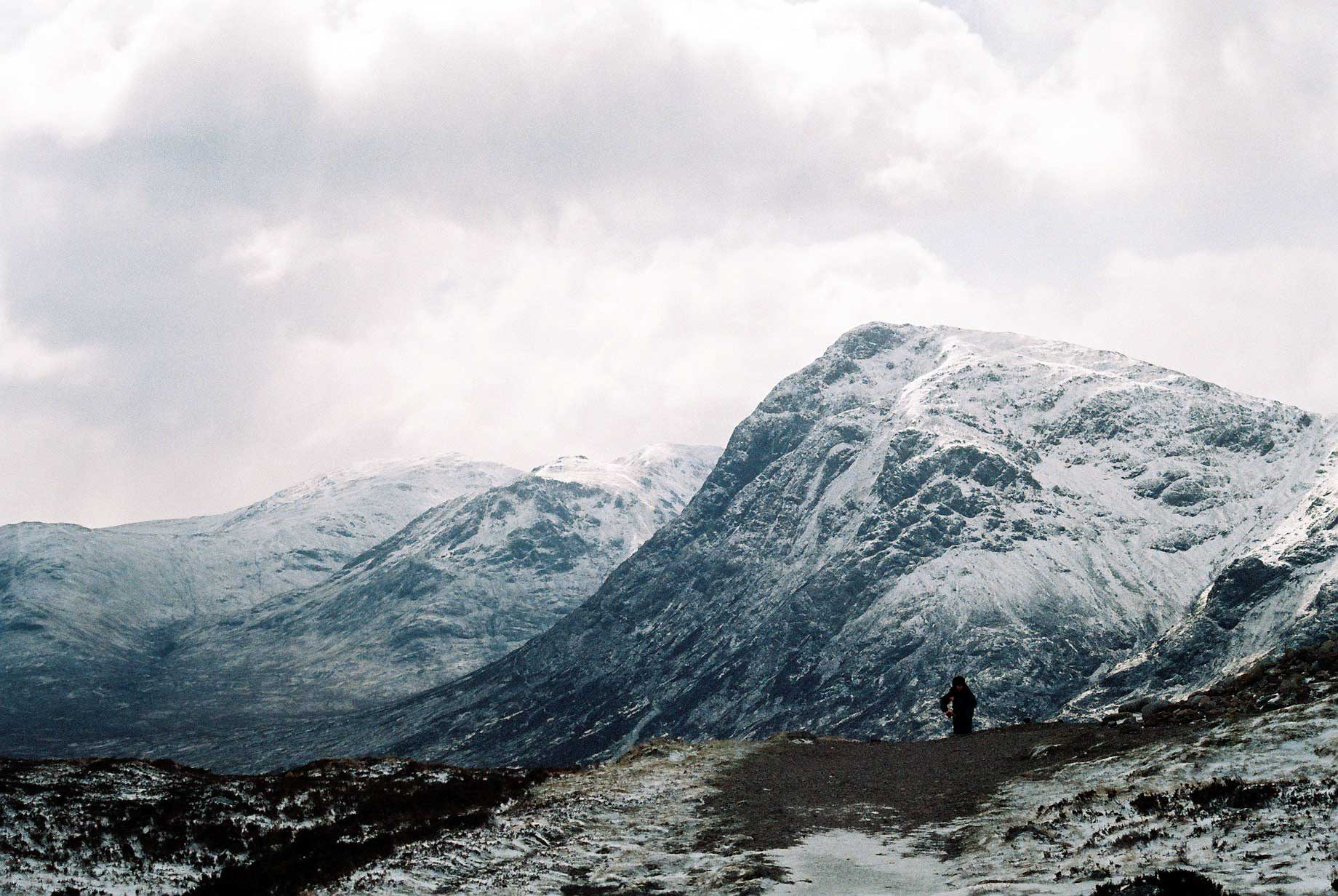
The Devil's Staircase on the West Highland Way

This page lists long-distance footpaths in Scotland. Scottish Natural Heritage have defined such paths as meaning a route that is at least 32 kilometres (20 mi) long and primarily off-road, or on quieter roads and tracks. This definition is consistent with that of the British Long Distance Walkers Association.

== Classification ==
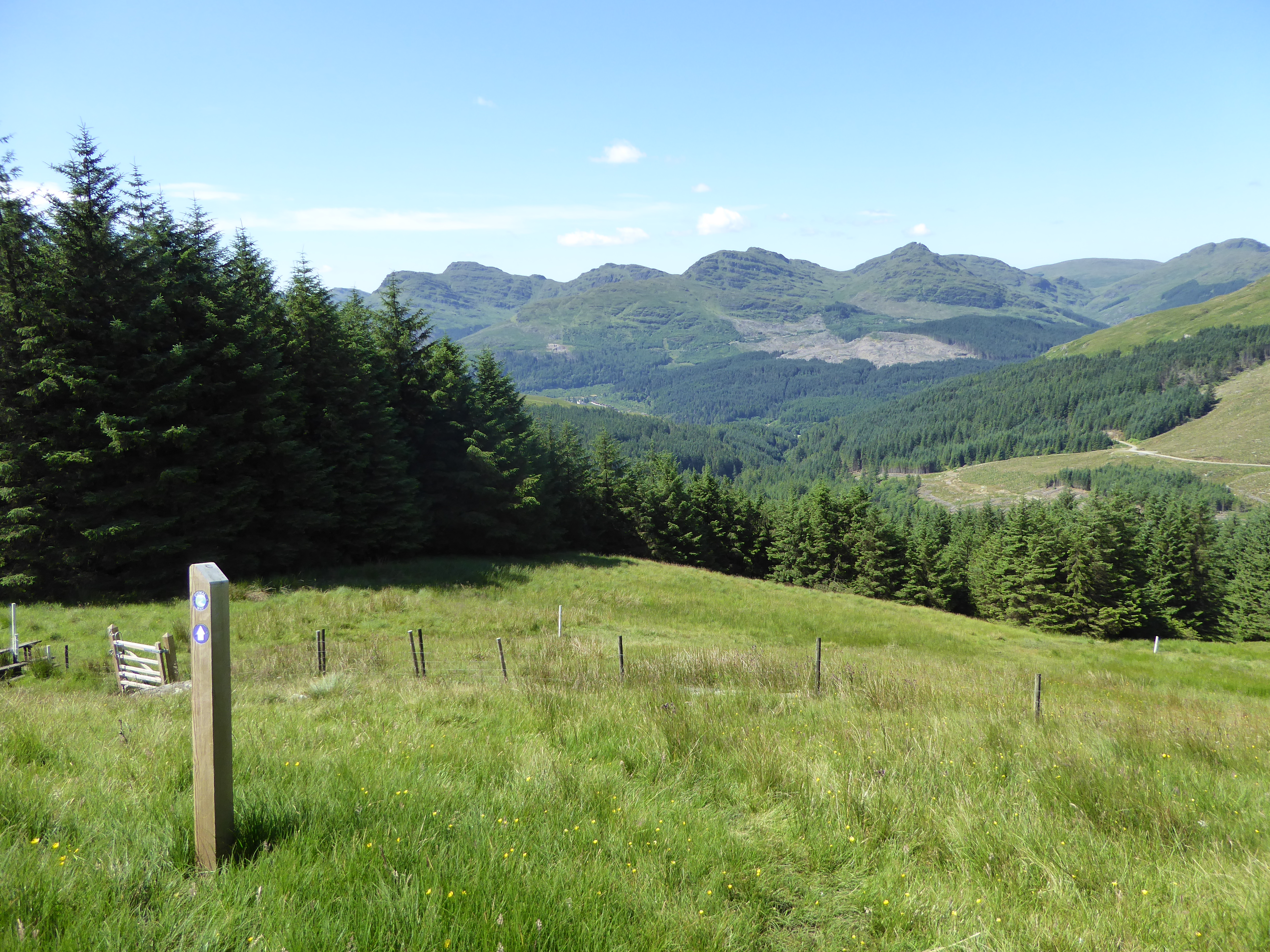
Cowal Way marker post above Donich Water.

Under Scots law the public has a right to responsible access to most land in Scotland, in accordance with the Scottish Outdoor Access Code, and access rights for new routes do not generally require to be negotiated. Many named walks have therefore been developed by local authorities, tourist organisations and guidebook authors. There is thus no single register or list of such paths, however some classifications have been developed by Scottish Natural Heritage (SNH):

- Scotland's Great Trails: these are routes judged as meeting standards defined by Scottish Natural Heritage. There are 29 such routes, offering over 3,000 kilometres (2,000 mi) of trails in total. Each of the routes is clearly waymarked with a dedicated symbol, and run largely off-road. They range in length from 24 to 210 miles (40 to 340 km), and are intended to be tackled over several days, either as a combination of day trips or as an end-to-end expedition. They are primarily intended for walkers, but may have sections suitable for cyclists and horse-riders. One of the trails, the Great Glen Canoe Trail, is designed for canoeists and kayakers.
- Heritage paths are routes that have historically been used for a specific purpose, such as Roman roads, drove roads, pilgrimage routes and miners’ paths.
- Themed routes are routes based on a specific topic, such as the social history or literary associations of the area through which the route passes.
- Virtual routes are routes which have do not have any official recognition or waymarking, but which have been promoted via media outlets such as websites, guidebooks or television programmes. A subcategory of these routes are "epic routes", defined as being routes that provide challenging travel over often rough ground in more remote ‘wild country’, being suitable for more experienced walkers with good navigation skills. These routes are not waymarked, so as to protect the ‘wild country’ qualities and to retain the element of challenge.
- Finally, the 6 miles (9.7 km) of the Pennine Way terminating at Kirk Yetholm are in Scottish Borders, Scotland, but are designated as one of the National Trails of England and Wales.

== List of Trails ==
Trail	Distance (km)	Start/Finish points	Description	Classification
Affric Kintail Way	71	Drumnadrochit & Morvich	Follows Glen Urquhart and Glen Affric between Loch Ness and the west coast.	Waymarked route
Annandale Way	90 (or 85)	Moffat & Newbie Barns	Follows the valley of the River Annan from its source in the Moffat Hills to the sea in the Solway Firth.	SGT
Arran Coastal Way	107	Circular route	Around the coastline of the Isle of Arran.	SGT
Ayrshire Coastal Path	161	Glenapp, Ballantrae & Skelmorlie	Along the length of the coastline of Ayrshire.	SGT
Berwickshire Coastal Path	48	Cockburnspath & Berwick-upon-Tweed	Along the length of the coastline of Berwickshire.	SGT
Borders Abbeys Way	109	Circular route: Kelso – Jedburgh – Hawick – Selkirk – Melrose	A circular route in the Borders passing the ruins of many abbeys.	SGT
Ca na Catanach	35	Dorrery Lodge & Achentoul	A medieval drovers' road in Caithness and Sutherland.	Heritage path
Cateran Trail	103	Circular route: Blairgowrie – Kirkmichael – Spittal of Glenshee – Alyth	A route following old drovers' roads, minor paved roads and farm tracks in Perth and Kinross and Angus.	SGT
Cape Wrath Trail	330	Fort William & Cape Wrath	Across the Northwest Highlands.	Virtual route
Clyde Coastal Path	176	Weymss Bay & Milngavie	Following the River Clyde until it reaches and crosses the Erskine Bridge. The path then goes inland across to Milngavie to the start of the West Highland Way. There are also two spurs to Paisley and Partick.	Waymarked route
Clyde Walkway	65	Glasgow & New Lanark	Along the course of the River Clyde.	SGT
Cross Borders Drove Road	82	Little Vantage (near Livingston) & Hawick	A route across the Borders region of Scotland, following tracks formerly used to drive cattle southwards for sale in England.	SGT
Dava Way	38	Grantown-on-Spey & Forres	Follow the trackbed of a closed section of the Highland Railway.	SGT
Deeside Way	66	Aberdeen & Ballater	Largely follows the trackbed of the former Deeside Railway.	Themed route
East Highland Way	132	Fort William & Aviemore	Links the West Highland Way and the Speyside Way.	Virtual route
Edinburgh the Walk	69	Edinburgh	Follows paths, roads and cycleways through Edinburgh's green spaces.	Virtual route
Formartine and Buchan Way	66 (or 68)	Dyce & Fraserburgh / Peterhead	Follows the track of the former railway line the Formartine and Buchan Railway which closed in 1970. The path branches into two sections at Maud.	SGT
Forth-Clyde/Union Canal Towpath	106	Bowling, West Dunbartonshire & Fountainbridge, Edinburgh	Follows the towpaths of the Forth and Clyde and Union canals between the Firth of Forth and the Firth of Clyde.	SGT
Great Glen Canoe Trail	96	Fort William & Clachnaharry	Follows the canals and lochs of the Great Glen.	SGT
Great Glen Way	125	Fort William & Inverness	Runs generally to the west of the canals and lochs of the Great Glen.	SGT
Great Trossachs Path	45	Callander & Inversnaid	A route through the forested hillsides of the Trossachs.	SGT
John Muir Way	215	Helensburgh & Dunbar	Named in honour of the Scottish conservationist John Muir, who was born in Dunbar in 1838 and became a founder of the United States National Park Service.	SGT
John o' Groats Trail	235	Inverness & John o' Groats	A largely coastal route in the North Highlands.	Waymarked route
Kintyre Way	161	Tarbert, Argyll & Machrihanish	A route across the Kintyre peninsula.	SGT
Loch Lomond and Cowal Way	92	Portavadie & Inveruglas	Across the Cowal peninsula.	SGT
Moray Coast Trail	72	Forres & Cullen	Along the coastline of Moray.	SGT
Mull of Galloway Trail	59	Mull of Galloway & Glenapp, Ballantrae	Links the Ayrshire Coastal Path to the Mull of Galloway.	SGT
North Highland Way	241	Cape Wrath & Duncansby Head	Along the north coast of Scotland.	Virtual route
Pennine Way	429	Edale & Kirk Yetholm	The northernmost 10 km are in Scotland.	National Trail (England and Wales)
River Ayr Way	66	Glenbuck & Ayr	Follows the course of the River Ayr.	SGT
Rob Roy Way	127 (or 154)	Drymen & Pitlochry	Links sites connected with the folk hero and outlaw Rob Roy MacGregor.	SGT
Romans and Reivers Route	84	Ae & Hawick	Much of the route follows former Roman roads in the Borders.	SGT
Roman Heritage Way	241	Wallsend & Melrose	Heads north from Hadrian's Wall into the Scottish Borders.	Virtual route
Scottish Coastal Way	-	N/A	A proposed route around the coastline of Scotland.	Proposed virtual route
Scottish National Trail	864	Kirk Yetholm & Cape Wrath	Devised by writer and broadcaster Cameron McNeish.	Virtual route
Sir Walter Scott Way	148 or 151	Moffat & Cockburnspath	Links places connected with Walter Scott.	Virtual route/themed route
Skye Trail	128	Rubha Hùinis & Broadford	A trail across the Isle of Skye.	Virtual route
Southern Upland Way	338	Portpatrick & Cockburnspath	A coast-to-coast walk across the Southern Uplands.	SGT
Speyside Way	107	Buckie & Aviemore (spur to Tomintoul)	Follows the course of the River Spey form near its source down to the sea.	SGT
St Cuthbert's Way	100	Melrose & Lindisfarne	A route linking sites associated with Cuthbert of Lindisfarne in both England and Scotland.	SGT
Sutherland Trail	111	Lochinver & Tongue	A trail across Sutherland, devised by writer and broadcaster Cameron McNeish.	Virtual route
Three Lochs Way	55	Balloch & Inveruglas	Links Loch Lomond, Gare Loch and Loch Long at the southern edge of the Highlands.	SGT
West Highland Way	154	Milngavie & Fort William	Scotland's first and most popular long-distance walking route.	SGT
West Island Way	48 (or 52)	Kilchattan Bay & Port Bannatyne	Located on the Isle of Bute, this was the first waymarked long-distance route on a Scottish island.	SGT

== See also ==
- List of long-distance footpaths in the United Kingdom
