= Scotland's Great Trails =

Long-distance routes in Scotland

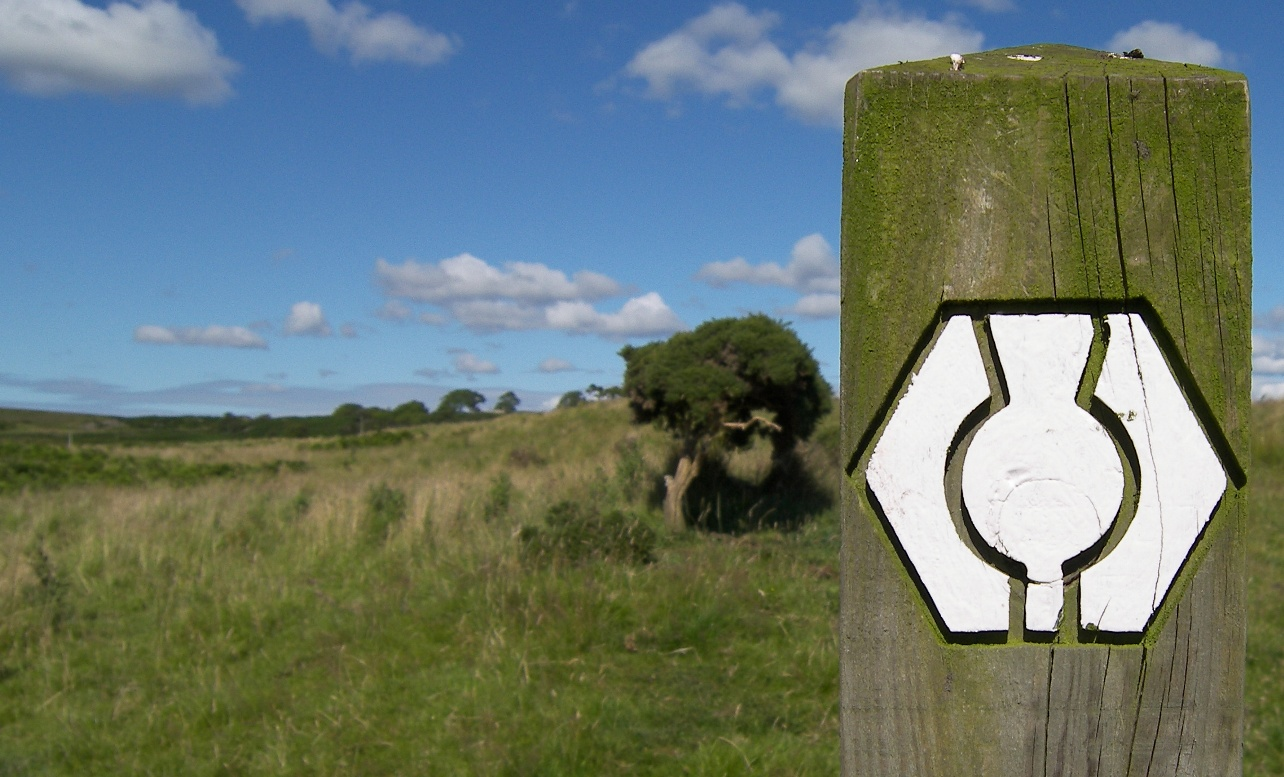
A typical waymark, on the Southern Upland Way

Map of mainland Scotland, with Scotland's Great Trails in red, excluding The Great Glen Canoe Trail.

Scotland's Great Trails are long-distance "people-powered" trails in Scotland, analogous to the National Trails of England and Wales or the Grande Randonnée paths of France. The designated routes are primarily intended for walkers, but may have sections suitable for cyclists and horse-riders; one of the trails, the Great Glen Canoe Trail, is designed for canoeists and kayakers. The trails range in length from 40 km (25 mi) to 340 km (210 mi), and are intended to be covered over several days, either as a combination of day trips or as an end-to-end trip.

In order to be classified as one of Scotland’s Great Trails, a route must fulfil certain criteria. The route must be at least 40 km (25 mi) in length, and be clearly waymarked with a dedicated symbol. It is expected that visitor services will be present along the way, and that the route will have an online presence to help visitors in planning their journey. Trails are required to run largely off-road, with less than 20% of the route on tarmac. NatureScot is the custodian of the Scotland's Great Trails brand, maintaining the official list and providing some finance and publicity, the responsibility however for creating and maintaining each route lies with the local authorities through which a route passes. There are 29 routes, providing 3,000 km (1,900 mi) of trails in total. Additionally, the northernmost 10 kilometres (6 mi) section of the Pennine Way between the Anglo-Scottish border and Kirk Yetholm lies within Scotland, although it is designated as one of the National Trails of England.

The route of each of the Great Trails is marked with coloured diamonds on Ordnance Survey Explorer (1:25000) and Landranger (1:50000) maps; the SGT logo of a thistle within a hexagon is also used to highlight the routes at the 1:25000 scale.

== History ==
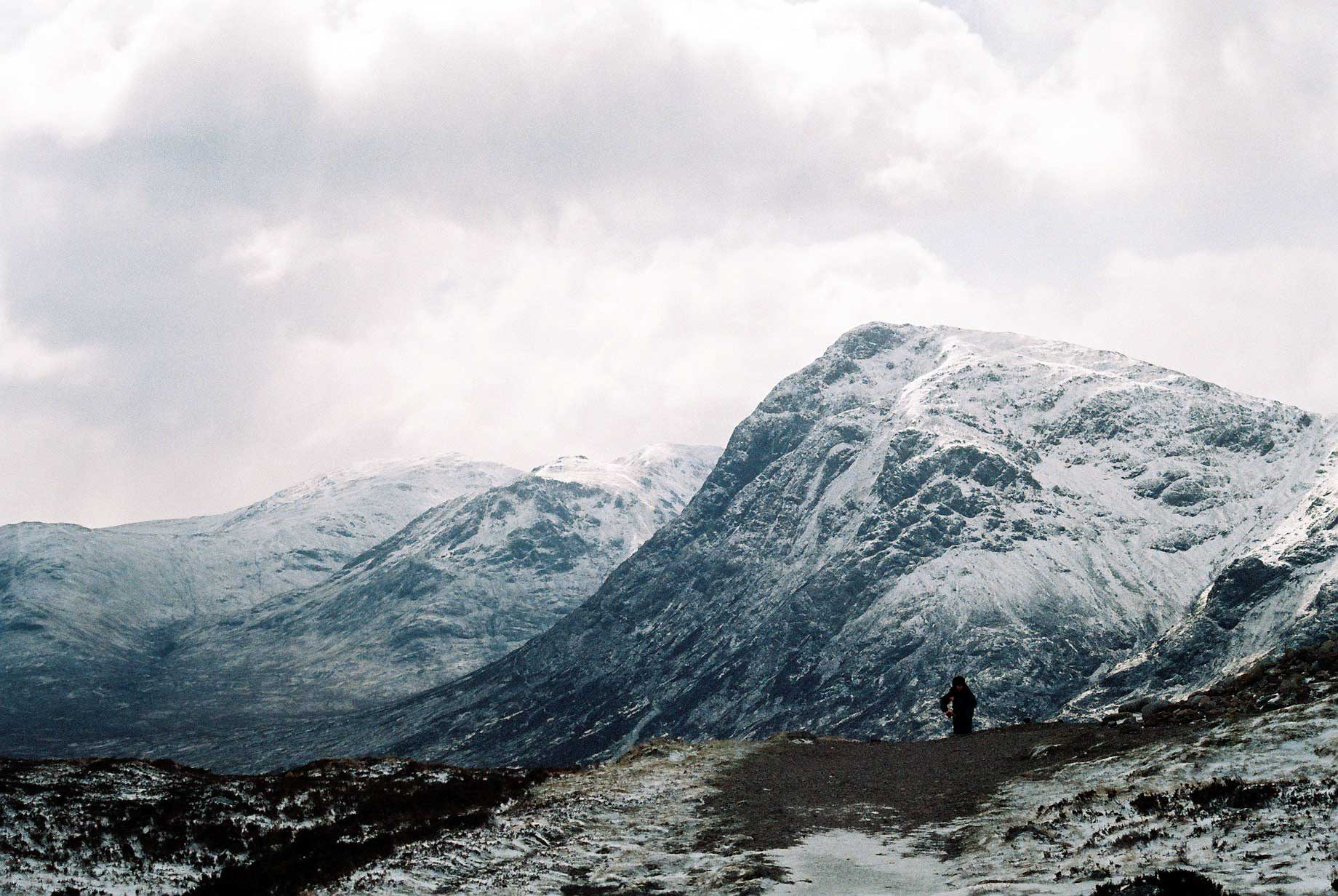
The Devil's Staircase on the West Highland Way, Scotland's first Long Distance Route

The trails grew out of the Long Distance Routes (LDRs), which were proposed and financially supported by Scottish Natural Heritage (SNH), and administered and maintained by the local authorities. The Countryside (Scotland) Act 1967 provided the legal basis for the Long Distance Routes, but the first one was not opened officially until 1980. By 2010 there were four LDRs:

- West Highland Way, opened in 1980
- Speyside Way, opened in 1981
- Southern Upland Way, opened in 1984
- Great Glen Way, opened in 2002

Following the passage of the Land Reform Act (Scotland) 2003, the public has a right to responsible access to most land in Scotland, in accordance with the Scottish Outdoor Access Code. Access rights for new routes therefore largely no longer required to be negotiated and many named walks have been developed by local authorities, tourist organisations and guidebook authors. In 2010 SNH decided that it would not formally designate any further LDRs, but would instead encourage more locally-based proposals for new routes for long-distance footpaths. Within this approach it was recognised that there was a need for a strong "brand identity" to aid marketing of Scotland’s longer distance routes internationally. Minimum standards would be applied in the selection of these branded routes, which would take account of factors such as:

Signage on the Fife Coastal Path

- safety
- attractiveness of scenery
- trail surfaces
- information
- facilities and services
- signage and waymarking
- route definition and continuity
- accessibility
- access by public and private transport
- route management

"Scotland's Great Trails" was chosen as the brand identity, and as of 2018 there were 29 officially recognised Great Trails.

== Routes ==
As of April 2024.

Trail	Distance (km)	Ascent (m)	Start/Finish points	Description
Annandale Way	90 (or 85)	1150	Moffat & Newbie Barns	Follows the valley of the River Annan from its source in the Moffat Hills to the sea in the Solway Firth.
Arran Coastal Way	107	390	Circular route	Around the coastline of the Isle of Arran.
Ayrshire Coastal Path	161	1110	Glenapp, Ballantrae & Skelmorlie	Along the length of the coastline of Ayrshire.
Berwickshire Coastal Path	48	1060	Cockburnspath & Berwick-upon-Tweed	Along the length of the coastline of Berwickshire.
Borders Abbeys Way	109	1300	Circular route: Kelso – Jedburgh – Hawick – Selkirk – Melrose	A circular route in the Borders passing the ruins of many abbeys.
Cateran Trail	103	2470	Circular route: Blairgowrie – Kirkmichael – Spittal of Glenshee – Alyth	A route following old drovers' roads, minor paved roads and farm tracks in Perth and Kinross and Angus.
Clyde Walkway	65	720	Glasgow & New Lanark	Along the course of the River Clyde.
Cross Borders Drove Road	82	2165	Little Vantage & Hawick	A route across the Borders region of Scotland, following tracks formerly used to drive cattle southwards for sale in England.
Dava Way	38	146	Grantown-on-Spey & Forres	Follows the trackbed of a closed section of the Highland Railway.
Fife Coastal Path	187	1865	Kincardine & Newburgh	Along the coastline of Fife.
Formartine and Buchan Way	66 (or 68)	420	Dyce & Fraserburgh / Peterhead	Follows the track of the former railway line the Formartine and Buchan Railway which closed in 1970. The path branches into two sections at Maud.
Forth-Clyde/Union Canal Towpath	106	158	Bowling, West Dunbartonshire & Fountainbridge, Edinburgh	Follows the towpaths of the Forth and Clyde and Union canals between the Firth of Forth and the Firth of Clyde.
Great Glen Canoe Trail	96	35	Fort William & Clachnaharry	Follows the canals and lochs of the Great Glen.
Great Glen Way	125	1835	Fort William & Inverness	Runs generally to the west of the canals and lochs of the Great Glen.
Great Trossachs Path	45	1165	Callander & Inversnaid	A route through the forested hillsides of the Trossachs.
John Muir Way	215	2015	Helensburgh & Dunbar	Named in honour of the Scottish conservationist John Muir, who was born in Dunbar in 1838 and became a founder of the United States National Park Service.
Kintyre Way	161	3140	Tarbert, Argyll & Machrihanish	A route across the Kintyre peninsula.
Loch Lomond and Cowal Way	92	1810	Portavadie & Inveruglas	Across the Cowal peninsula.
Moray Coast Trail	72	410	Forres & Cullen	Along the coastline of Moray.
Mull of Galloway Trail	59	480	Mull of Galloway & Glenapp, Ballantrae	Links the Ayrshire Coastal Path to the Mull of Galloway.
River Ayr Way	66	470	Glenbuck & Ayr	Follows the course of the River Ayr.
Rob Roy Way	127 (or 154)	2325	Drymen & Pitlochry	Links sites connected with the folk hero and outlaw Rob Roy MacGregor.
Romans and Reivers Route	84	1695	Ae & Hawick	Much of the route follows former Roman roads in the Borders.
Southern Upland Way	338	7775	Portpatrick & Cockburnspath	A coast-to-coast walk across the Southern Uplands.
Speyside Way	137	1485	Buckie & Newtonmore (spur to Tomintoul)	Follows the course of the River Spey form near its source down to the sea.
St Cuthbert's Way	100	2075	Melrose & Lindisfarne	A route linking sites associated with Cuthbert of Lindisfarne in both England and Scotland.
Three Lochs Way	55	1560	Balloch & Inveruglas	Links Loch Lomond, Gare Loch and Loch Long at the southern edge of the Highlands.
West Highland Way	154	3155	Milngavie & Fort William	Scotland's first and most popular long-distance walking route.
West Island Way	48 (or 52)	690	Kilchattan Bay & Port Bannatyne	Located on the Isle of Bute, this was the first waymarked long-distance route on a Scottish island.

== See also ==
- Long-distance footpaths in Scotland
- National Trails (English and Welsh equivalent)
- Long-distance footpaths in the UK
- Scottish Coastal Way
