= Great Trossachs Path =

Hiking path in Scotland

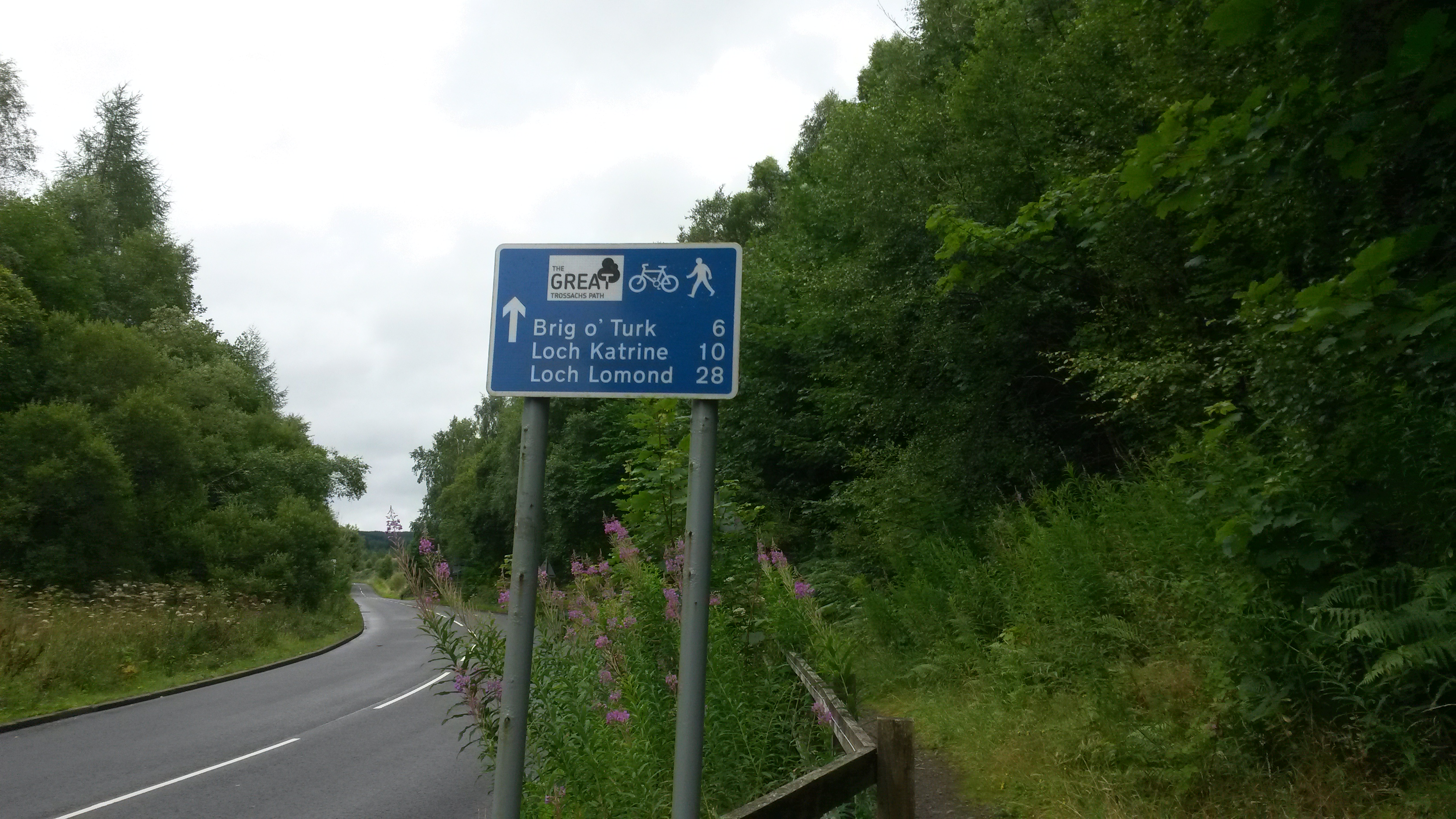
- Signage on the path at the A821 near Kilmahog.
- Length: 48 km (30 mi)
- Location: Stirling, Scotland
- Established: 2015
- Designation: Scotland's Great Trails
- Trailheads: Callander 56.244°N 4.217°W; Inversnaid 56.243°N 4.685°W
- Use: Walking, cycling, and horseriding.
- Elevation gain/loss: 1,165 metres (3,822 ft) gain
- Season: All Year
- Website: http://thegreattrossachsforest.co.uk/great-trossachs-path/what-is-the-great-trossachs-path/

The Great Trossachs Path is a 48-kilometre (30 mi) long-distance footpath through the Trossachs, in the Stirling council area of Scotland. It runs between Callander in the east and Inversnaid on the banks of Loch Lomond in the west, passing along the northern shores of Loch Katrine and Loch Arklet. The path is suitable for walkers and cyclists; much of the route is also suitable for experience horse riders, although the middle section along the shoreline of Loch Katrine is tarmacked and so may not be ideal for horses.

The path is listed as one of Scotland's Great Trails by NatureScot, and also links to two of the other Great Trails, the West Highland Way and the Rob Roy Way. It is also possible to link the path with two further Great Trails via the ferry across Loch Lomond from Inversnaid to Inveruglas, which is the terminus of both the Three Lochs Way and the Cowal Way. The path also links to National Cycle Route 7 at Callander.

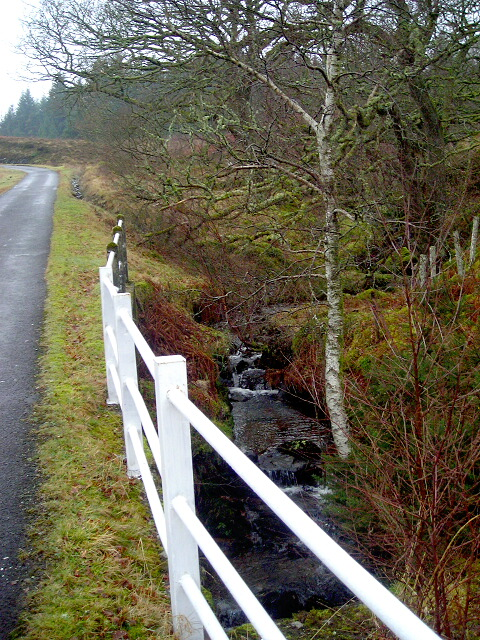
Great Trossach Path near Loch Katrine

Launched in April 2015, the path lies almost completely within the Great Trossachs Forest National Nature Reserve. The reserve is considered to be a "forest in the making", and is managed jointly by Forestry and Land Scotland, RSPB Scotland and Woodland Trust Scotland. The national nature reserve project aims to deliver a varied landscape that provides habitats for species that are otherwise rare in Britain, including black grouse, golden eagle, osprey, wildcat, pine marten, red squirrel, water vole and otter.
