= Beinn Challuim =

Scottish mountain in the Loch Lomond and the Trossachs National Park

Coordinates: 56.454°N 4.6198°W

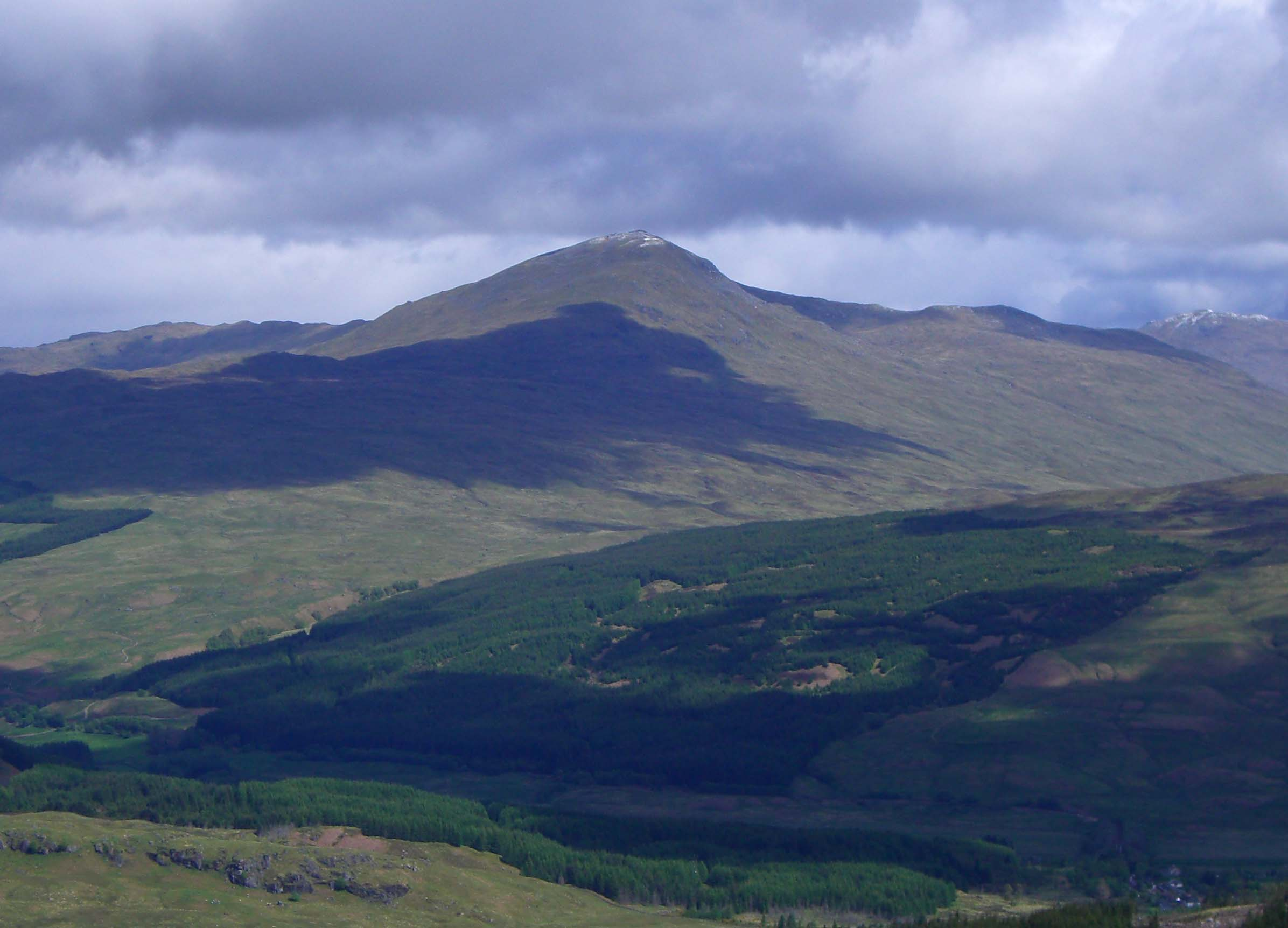
- Beinn Challuim seen from the high ground around Crianlarich, 12 km to the south.

Highest point
- Elevation: 1,025 m (3,363 ft)
- Prominence: 450 m (1,480 ft)
- Listing: Munro, Marilyn

Naming
- English translation: Callum's mountain
- Language of name: Gaelic
- Pronunciation: Scottish Gaelic: [peɲ ˈxal̪ˠəm]

Geography
- Location within Scotland
- Location: Stirling, Scotland
- Parent range: Grampians
- OS grid: NN386322
- Topo map: OS Landranger 50, OS Explorer 378

Listed summits of Beinn Challuim
Name	Grid ref	Height	Status
South Top	NN386315	998 m (3,274 ft)	Munro Top

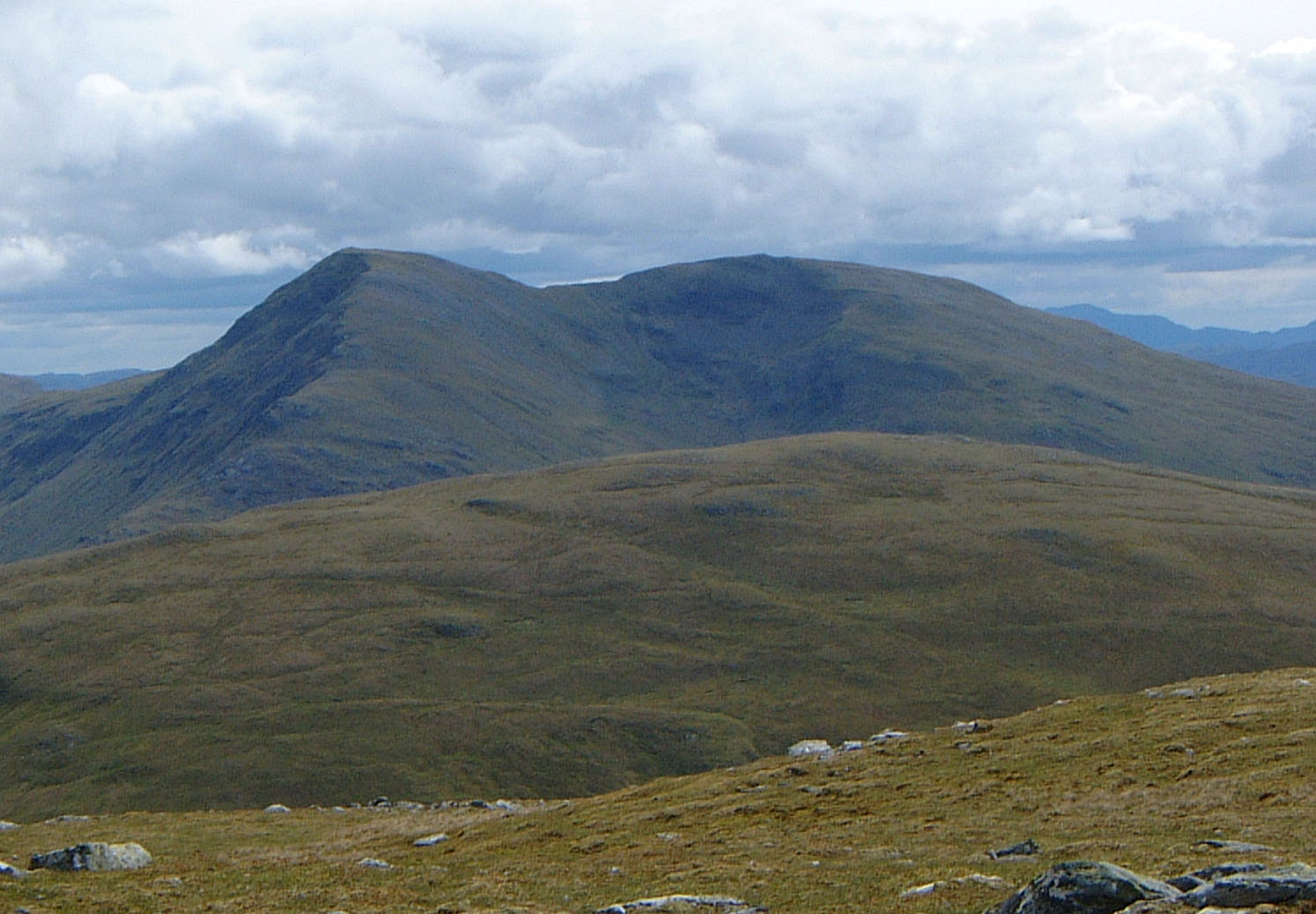
This view from the west shows both the main summit (left) and the South Top (right) of Beinn Challuim.

Beinn Challuim (English: Ben Challum) is a mountain in the Breadalbane region of the Scottish Highlands. It is east of the village of Tyndrum, in the Forest of Mamlorn, an ancient deer forest at the northern edge of Loch Lomond and the Trossachs National Park. It is a Munro with a height of 1,025 metres (3,363 ft).

== Overview ==
With a height of 1025 metres (3363 feet) and a prominence of 450 metres (1480 feet) Ben Challuim qualifies as a Munro and a Marilyn. It stands at the head of Glen Lochay and is a prominent peak when seen from the head of that glen, its western slopes dominate the north eastern side of Strath Fillan. When seen from the south the summit of the mountain cannot be seen, being hidden behind the south top. The mountain name was originally written as Beinn Challuim before Ben Challum became the norm. However in recent years the Ordnance Survey have reverted to using the original name on their maps.

The name translates as "Callum's mountain", which could refer to Saint Columba who is known in Scottish Gaelic as "Calum Cille". With St Fillan's priory lying on the south west foothills of the mountain (St Fillan brought Christianity from the monastery of St Columba on Iona into Breadalbane), the Columba connection is feasible.

== Geography ==
Beinn Challuim is often regarded as a smooth grassy hill mainly because these are the characteristics of the southern and western slopes which are seen by many people from the A82 road around Strath Fillan. However from the north it shows a more exciting form with a steep and rocky face overlooking the head of Glen Lochay. Beinn Challuim is made up of three ridges, the broad grassy south west ridge descends to Strath Fillan and is used in ascents from there. The north west ridge is steep and rocky and descends to the Bealach Ghlas-Leathaid (575 metres) and then connects to the Corbett of Cam Chreag. Another ridge goes easterly, descending into Glen Lochay.

The mountain has a subsidiary summit which is listed in the Munro Tables as a “Top”, The South Top reaches a height of 998 metres and lies 600 metres south of the highest point. The two summits are connected by a ridge and this area can be confusing in poor visibility with the logical temptation to go north to the main summit possibly resulting in encountering steep crags. The proper route from the south top is to go initially west for a short distance across a hollow and onto the ridge which leads north to the main summit. The summit ridge has two corries on either side, to the west is the Coire nan Each (Corrie of the Horse) and to the east is Coire Challuim (Callum's Corrie). Drainage from the mountain reaches both coasts of Scotland at the Firth of Tay on the east coast and the Firth of Clyde on the west coast.

== Ascents and summit ==
The most popular route of ascent starts at Kirkton Farm in Strath Fillan (grid reference NN358280), this gives the opportunity to visit the ruins of St. Fillans Priory at the beginning or end of the walk. The route continues north east up grassy slopes to reach the summit ridge. A more interesting ascent starts at the road end in Glen Lochay, this gives the chance to view the more noteworthy northern side of the mountain but involves a nine-kilometre walk up the glen to the foot of the eastern ridge. Hamish Brown recommends a northern approach starting at Auch (grid reference NN324355) “if you want to be different” but this requires good navigation and some mild scrambling up the north west ridge.

The actual summit of the mountain is named as Stob Glas (greenish-grey peak) on maps and has a large cairn which overlooks the sheer northern face. The view from the top gives fine views of the many peaks around the Tyndrum and Crianlarich area.
