= Edinburgh the Walk =

Edinburgh guidebook detailing long distance walk route around city

Edinburgh THE WALK
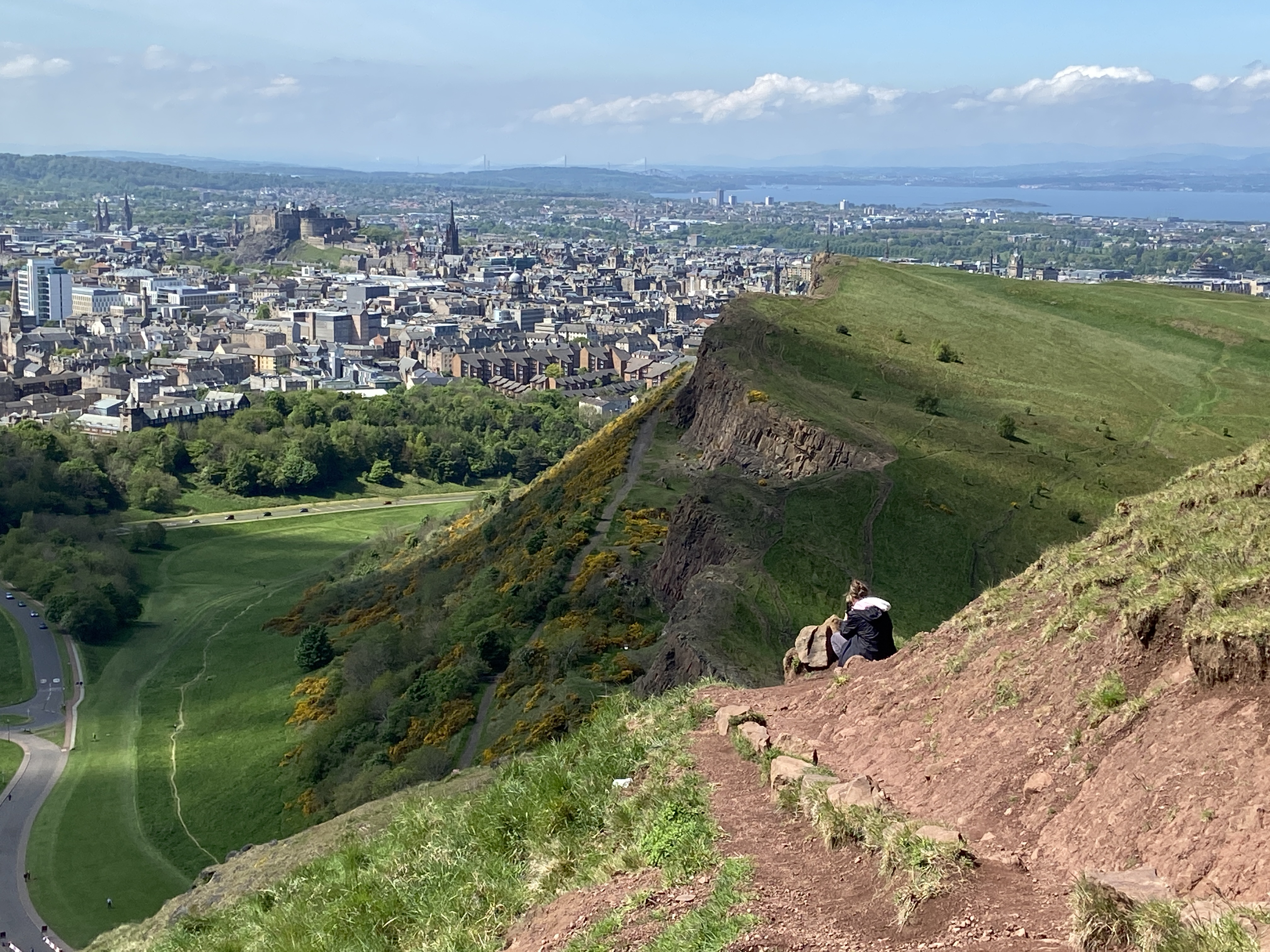
- Salisbury Crags and the Firth of Forth
- Length: 69 km (43 mi)
- Location: Edinburgh Scotland
- Established: 2022
- Designation: Long-distance footpaths in Scotland
- Trailheads: Edinburgh Castle Esplanade 55.948°N 3.197°W; Holyrood Palace 55.953°N 3.172°E
- Use: Hiking
- Elevation gain/loss: 251 metres (823 ft) gain
- Highest point: Arthur's Seat
- Sights: Edinburgh Castle Calton Hill Firth of Forth Cramond Craigmillar Castle Holyrood Palace

Edinburgh the Walk (stylized Edinburgh THE WALK), is a guidebook by Roddy McDougall and Elizabeth May. It describes a long-distance footpath linking the parks, green spaces and hills of Scotland's capital city. The book outlines a 69 kilometres (43 mi) long route which is divided into eight sections. While not currently waymarked, it follows parts of several long-established walking routes in the city - John Muir Way, Water of Leith Walkway, River Almond, Lothian Walkway as well as paths created from the city's former railway lines. It is intended to be for Edinburgh what the Capital Ring is for London - a walking route which leads through different parts of the city which might not otherwise be visited. The book highlights the geology, architecture and arts of Edinburgh beyond its better-known centre including some of those who have contributed to the city's history - novelist and poet Sir Walter Scott, geologist and writer Hugh Miller, geologist James Hutton and the Duke of Buccleuch.

The route starts at Edinburgh Castle and heads north east towards the port of Leith before going alongside the southern shore of the Firth of Forth. From there it turns inland at Cramond and heads south over Corstorphine Hill towards Craiglockhart Hill.The route then takes in the summits of Braid Hills and Blackford Hill before heading towards Craigmillar Castle. It then leads north towards the seaside resort of Portobello, Edinburgh before climbing up to the city's highest point, the extinct volcano Arthur's Seat. The route ends at the gates to Holyrood Palace beside the Scottish Parliament Building.

Travel-writer Richard Franks completed the whole walk in three and a half days. The route was also featured on 'Out of Doors' on BBC Radio Scotland in August 2022. Each section of the route begins and ends with access to public transport.

== Route ==
=== Edinburgh Castle to Leith ===
This section, which is 8.5 kilometres (5.3 mi) long, starts on the Esplanade at Edinburgh Castle and proceeds through Princes Street Gardens and over Calton Hill, passing one of Edinburgh's lesser-known lochs, Lochend, Edinburgh before ending at historic Shore at Leith.

=== Leith to Granton ===
This 8 kilometres (5.0 mi) section goes through the port of Leith and along the shore at Trinity to the harbour of Granton, an area of Edinburgh which is currently undergoing urban regeneration. This section makes use of some of Edinburgh's cycle paths, many of them former suburban railway lines.

=== Granton to Maybury Road ===
For the first half of this 10 kilometres (6.2 mi) section, the route stays close to the southern coast of the Firth of Forth with views over to Fife. There are stretches of beach beside Silverknowes and the route follows the River Almond Walkway inland, passing through the Cammo Estate to end at Maybury Road.

=== Maybury Road to Balgreen tram stop ===
This 7 kilometres (4.3 mi) section is the shortest on the route and climbs up Corstorphine Hill to the tower, passing the historic viewpoint of 'Rest and Be Thankful' and the back of Edinburgh Zoo. The route follows part of the John Muir Way before continuing through suburban housing to end at Balgreen tram stop.

=== Balgreen tram stop to Greenbank ===
Highlights of this 8 kilometres (5.0 mi) section include Saughton Park, site of the 1908 Scottish National Exhibition. It follows part of the Water of Leith and climbs to the Slateford Aqueduct carrying the Union Canal (Scotland) before rising to the top of Easter Craiglockhart Hill and finishing in the suburb of Greenbank.

=== Greenbank to Nether Liberton ===
This section features the southern hills of Braid Hills and Blackford Hill, the latter the home of the Royal Observatory, Edinburgh, before ending at Nether Liberton, Edinburgh. This 8.5 kilometres (5.3 mi) section is probably the most open and rural of what is an urban walk and has fine views of the city.

=== Nether Liberton to Portobello ===
This is a relatively flat section 11 kilometres (6.8 mi) of the route which passes the ruins of historic Craigmillar Castle where the murder of Mary Queen of Scots' husband Henry Stuart, Lord Darnley was plotted in 1567. The route then follows Edinburgh's newest urban park, Little France Park, and finishes at the seaside resort of Portobello, Edinburgh.

=== Portobello to the Palace of Holyroodhouse ===
The final section 8 kilometres (5.0 mi) is strenuous as it involves a climb up Arthur's Seat as well as a challenging descent down the Zigzag path. There are excellent views of the city from the summit and the route ends at the foot of the Royal Mile by the gates of Holyrood Palace and yards from the Scottish Parliament Building.
