= Wallace's Isle =

Island in Scotland

Coordinates: 56°14′44″N 4°42′38″W

Wallace's Isle is an island in Loch Lomond, Scotland.

Wallace's Isle is a low, flat island in the mouth of Inveruglas Water, just south of Inveruglas and not far from Inveruglas Isle. It is covered with alder trees.

The island may be named after the Scottish patriot William Wallace, who may have sought refuge on it.
