= Loch Lomond and Cowal Way =

Long distance footpath in Scotland

Loch Lomond & Cowal Way
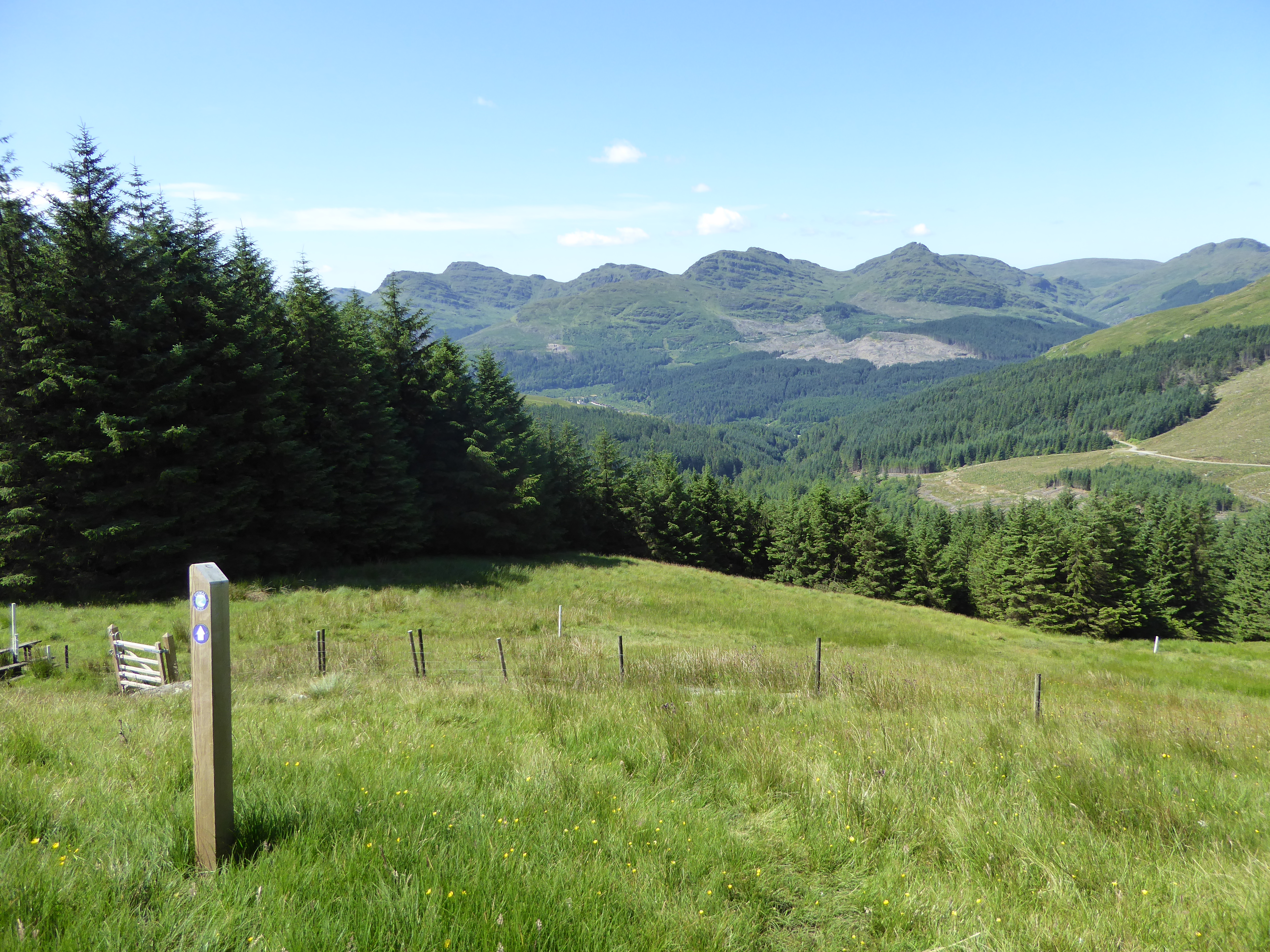
- Cowal Way marker post above Donich Water
- Length: 92 km (57 mi)
- Location: Cowal, Argyll and Bute, Scotland
- Established: 2000
- Designation: Scotland’s Great Trails
- Trailheads: Portavadie 55.876863°N 5.3132076°W; Inveruglas 56.251516°N 4.7086493°W
- Use: Hiking, Biking
- Elevation gain/loss: 1,810 metres (5,940 ft) gain
- Highest point: 520 m (1,710 ft)
- Lowest point: Sea Level
- Season: All Year
- Waymark: Yes
- Website: http://www.lochlomondandcowalway.org

The Loch Lomond and Cowal Way is a waymarked footpath in Argyll and Bute, Scotland, which runs between Portavadie and Inveruglas. It was formerly known as the Cowal Way, a reference to the Cowal peninsula, but was renamed in December 2018 to reflect the fact that half of the route lies with the Loch Lomond and The Trossachs National Park. The way is 92 kilometres (57 mi) long, and is suitable for both walkers and mountain bikers. Much of the route is also suitable for experienced horseriders, although in some places steps, narrow footbridges and gates may restrict access for horses. A review to identify these obstacles and suggest alternative routes and/or remedial measures was undertaken in 2016.

The route was first established in 2000, and is managed by the Colintraive and Glendaruel Development Trust. It was renamed in 2018 to in order to increase usage of the trail, as the Trust considered that Loch Lomond had higher brand recognition in the target markets.

Since 2016 the trail has been listed as one of Scotland's Great Trails by NatureScot. The route is fully waymarked with the Loch Lomond and Cowal Way logo, which depicts a stylised image of a path in a landscape of hills and lochs. The trail links directly to another of the Great Trails, the Three Lochs Way, which shares the section between Arrochar and Inveruglas. There are also indirect links to three further Great Trails at both end points of the Loch Lomond and Cowal Way: at Portavadie there is a Caledonian MacBrayne ferry service to Tarbert, which is one of termini of the Kintyre Way, whilst at Inveruglas there is a passenger ferry across Loch Lomond to Inversnaid, which is one of the termini of the Great Trossachs Path, and lies on the West Highland Way.

As of 2018 around 45,000 people use the way each year, of whom over 3,000 walk, cycle or run the complete route. The top five markets for users are Scotland, England, the Netherlands, Germany, and North America.
