= Three Lochs Way =

Long-distance path in the west of Scotland

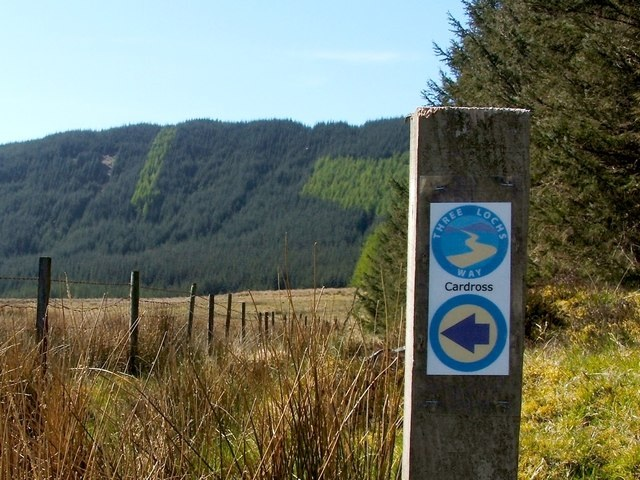
- The Three Lochs Way near Craigendoran
- Length: 55 km (34 mi)
- Location: Argyll and Bute, Scotland
- Designation: Scotland's Great Trails
- Trailheads: Balloch (56.003°N 4.584°W); Inveruglas (56.252°N 4.710°W)
- Use: Hiking
- Elevation gain/loss: 1,560 metres (5,120 ft) gain
- Waymark: Yes
- Website: http://threelochsway.co.uk

The Three Lochs Way is a 55-kilometre (34 mi) long-distance path in Argyll and Bute in Scotland that links Balloch and Inveruglas. The path crosses the Highland Boundary Fault, which divides the Scottish Highlands from the Lowlands, and is named for the three major lochs linked by the route: Loch Lomond, the Gare Loch and Loch Long. About 1,500 people use the path every year, of whom about 300 complete the entire route.

The route was first conceived of in 1991 by Alan Day, secretary of the Helensburgh & District Access Trust. The trust began promoting the route in 2010, and have since undertaken work across the route to improve the signage and path conditions, leading to the route now being designated as one of Scotland's Great Trails by NatureScot. The Three Lochs Way links directly to the Cowal Way (also designated as one of the Great Trails), which shares the section along Glen Loin between Arrochar and Inveruglas. The Way crosses the route of a second Great Trail, the John Muir Way, either side of Helensburgh. The West Highland Way, Scotland's first officially designated long distance trail can also be linked to the Three Lochs Way via a ferry over Loch Lomond from the start/finish point of Inveruglas, joining the West Highland Way at Inversnaid. By combining sections of the three paths and the ferry, a circular walk around southern Loch Lomond is possible.

In April 2018 an ultramarathon was due to be held along the route of the Three Lochs Way, but was cancelled with less than 24 hours' notice due to the company organising the event going into administration. Around 60 of the 700 people entered in the event chose to complete the course despite the lack of any organised support.
