= Arran Coastal Way =

Coastal path around Arran, Scotland

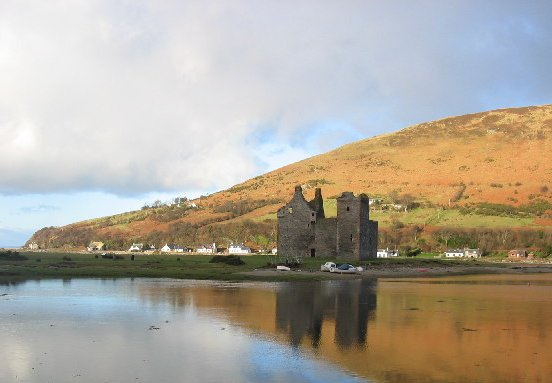
- Lochranza Castle
- Length: 107 km (66 mi)
- Location: Arran, Scotland
- Established: 2003
- Designation: Scotland's Great Trails
- Trailheads: Circular, typically started and finished in Brodick. 55.576°N 5.151°W
- Use: Hiking
- Elevation gain/loss: 390 metres (1,280 ft) gain
- Lowest point: Sea level
- Website: http://www.coastalway.co.uk/

The Arran Coastal Way is a 107 kilometre long-distance trail that goes around the coastline of Arran in Scotland. As the route is circular, following the coastline of the island, it can be started and finished at any location, however in recognition of the fact that most visitors to the island arrive and depart via the Caledonian MacBrayne ferry a start/finish monument is located on the seafront near Brodick ferry terminal. The route is fully waymarked, using marker posts featuring a gannet.

The idea of the Arran Coastal Way was conceived by Hugh McKerrell and Richard Sim in the 1990s, which was formally opened by Cameron McNeish on 28 March 2003. The route is maintained by the Arran Access Trust, and was designated as one of Scotland's Great Trails by NatureScot in June 2017.
