= Rob Roy Way =

Scottish trail

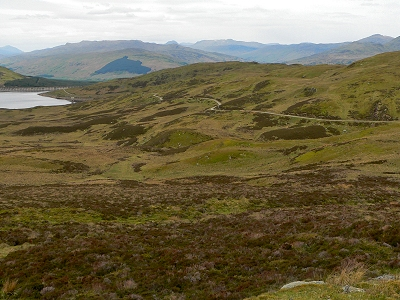
- The Rob Roy Way near Killin
- Length: 127 kilometres (79 mi) or 154 kilometres (96 mi)
- Location: Stirling and Perth and Kinross, Scotland
- Established: 2002
- Designation: Scotland's Great Trails
- Trailheads: Drymen; 56.0658°N 4.4524°W; Pitlochry; 56.7022°N 3.7326°W
- Use: Walking
- Elevation gain/loss: 2,325 metres (7,628 ft) gain
- Waymark: Yes
- Website: http://www.robroyway.com

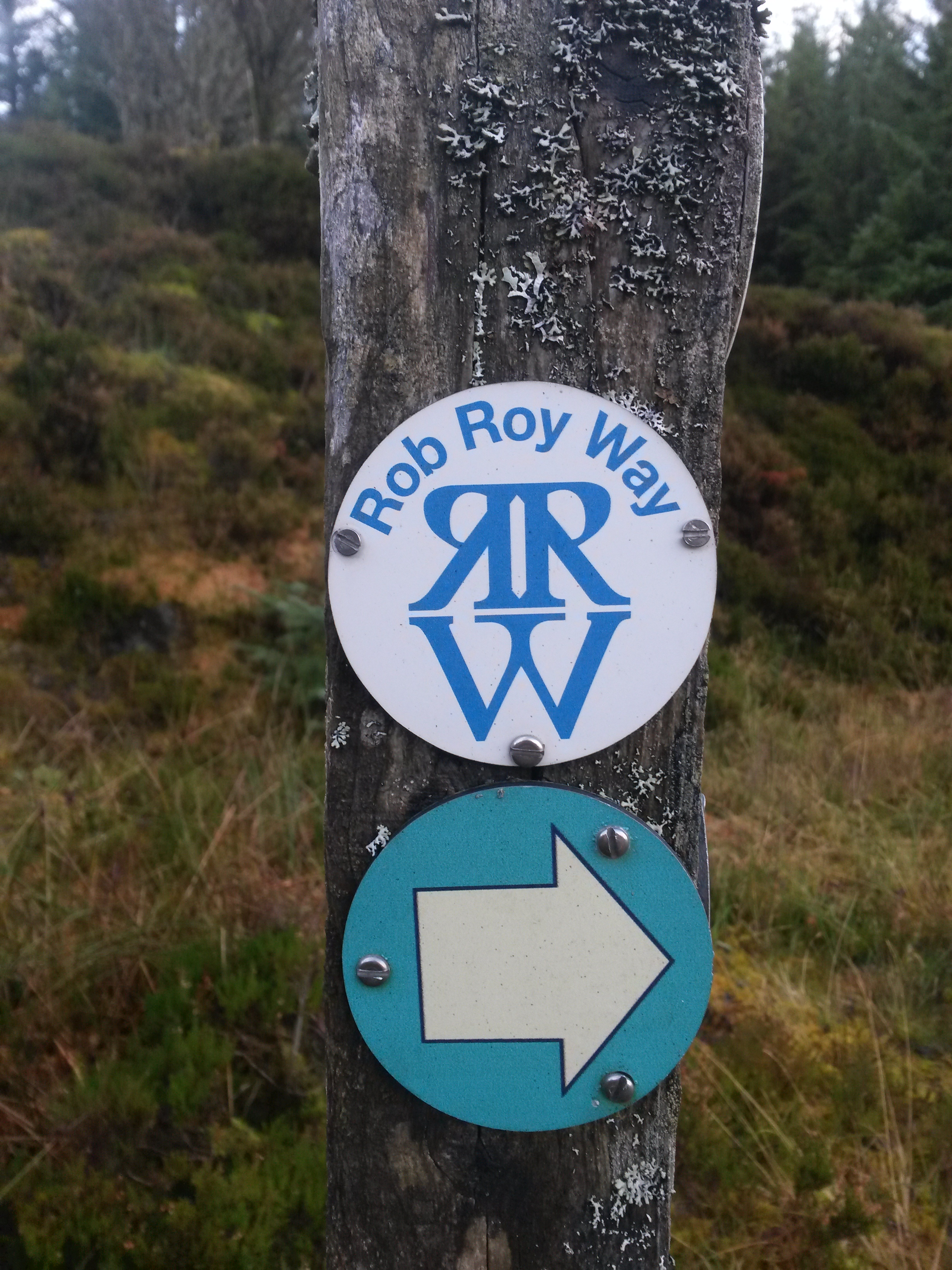
Signage on the Rob Roy Way south of Loch Tay.

The Rob Roy Way is a Scottish long distance footpath that runs from Drymen in Stirling to Pitlochry in Perth and Kinross. The path was created in 2002, and takes its name from Rob Roy MacGregor, a Scottish folk hero and outlaw of the early 18th century. It traverses countryside that he knew and travelled frequently. The route crosses the Highland Boundary Fault, a geological fault where the Highlands meet the Lowlands. Views from the trail overlook Loch Lubnaig, Loch Earn, Loch Venachar and Loch Tay. The way is 127 kilometres (79 mi) in length if the direct route along the southern shore of Loch Tay and the River Tay is followed between Ardtalnaig and Aberfeldy. An optional loop also links these places via Amulree: choosing this option increases the length by a further 27 kilometres (17 mi) to 154 kilometres (96 mi).

The Rob Roy Way was designated as one of Scotland's Great Trails by NatureScot in spring 2012, and also links to two further Great Trails, meeting the Great Trossachs Path near Callander, and the West Highland Way just north of Drymen. The Rob Roy Way also shares sections of route with Route 7 of the National Cycle Network, which also links Drymen and Pitlochry. Shared sections include the minor road on the south side of Loch Tay and the section following the route of the former Callander and Oban Railway, including Glen Ogle viaduct.

Besides Drymen and Pitlochry, the way passes through Aberfoyle, Callander, Strathyre, Killin, Amulree and Aberfeldy.

About 3,000 people use the path every year, of whom about 450 complete the entire route.
