= River Ayr Way =

Long-distance path in southern Scotland

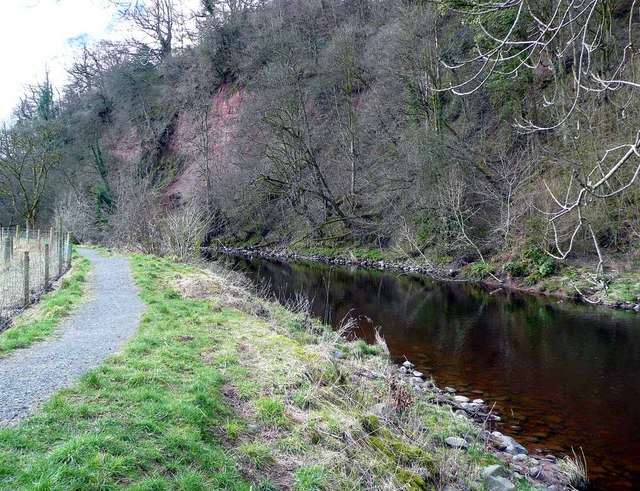
- The River Ayr Way west of Catrine
- Length: 66 km (41 mi)
- Location: Ayrshire, Scotland
- Established: 2006
- Designation: Scotland's Great Trails
- Trailheads: Glenbuck Loch55.537°N 3.974°W; Ayr55.469°N 4.642°W
- Use: Hiking
- Elevation gain/loss: 470 metres (1,540 ft) gain
- Lowest point: Sea level
- Waymark: Yes
- Website: https://eastayrshireleisure.com/countryside-outdoor/the-river-ayr-way/

The River Ayr Way is a long-distance path in Ayrshire, Scotland. The route, which is 66 km long, follows the course of the River Ayr from its source at Glenbuck Loch to the sea at Ayr, where the trail links with the Ayrshire Coastal Path. The path was developed as part of the Coalfield Access Project, a funding package of £2.5m that was used to improve public access to the countryside in the former mining districts of Ayrshire. The route was officially opened in 2006 by broadcaster Fred Macaulay, and is now designated as one of Scotland's Great Trails by NatureScot. As of 2018 about 137,000 people were using the path each year, of whom about 41,000 walked the entire route.

An ultramarathon is held annually along the entire length of the route, running "downhill" from source to sea. A relay race is also run, allowing teams of two or three persons split the route into three sections. The three sections are:

- Section 1: Glenbuck to Sorn, 27 kilometres (17 mi)
- Section 2: Sorn to Annbank, 23 kilometres (14 mi)
- Section 3: Annbank to Ayr, 14 kilometres (9 mi)
