= Kintyre Way =

Long-distance path in Argyll and Bute, Scotland

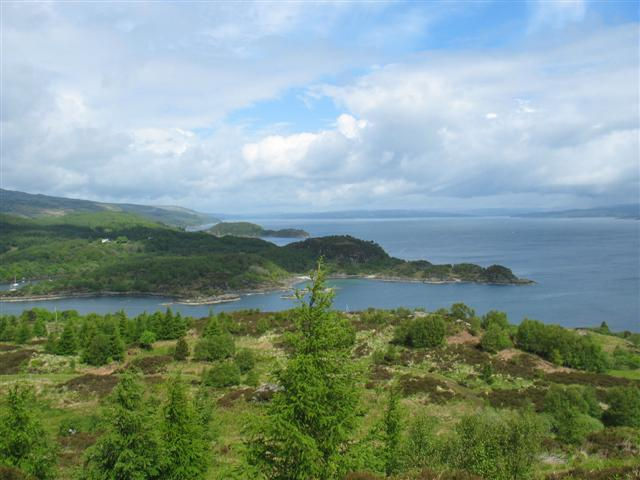
- East Loch Tarbert from the Kintyre Way.
- Length: 161 km (100 mi)
- Location: Kintyre, Argyll and Bute, Scotland
- Designation: Scotland's Great Trails
- Trailheads: Machrihanish 55.424°N 5.734°W; Tarbert 55.863°N 5.414°W
- Use: Walking, cycling
- Elevation gain/loss: 3,140 metres (10,300 ft) gain.
- Lowest point: Sea Level
- Season: All Year
- Waymark: Yes

The Kintyre Way is a waymarked footpath through the Kintyre Peninsula in Argyll and Bute, west of Scotland. It runs between Machrihanish near the southern end of the peninsula's west coast, and Tarbert at the northern end of Kintyre where the peninsula is linked to Knapdale, via Campbeltown. The way is 161 kilometres (100 mi) long, and is fully waymarked. Additionally there are distance markers at 1 mile (1.6 km) intervals along the route. The route is primarily intended for walkers, but most sections can also be cycled.

The Kintyre Way is designated as one of Scotland's Great Trails by NatureScot. It can be linked to another one of the Great Trails via Tarbert, where there is a Caledonian MacBrayne ferry service to Portavadie, which is the start/finish point of the Cowal Way. As of 2018, it was estimated that between one and two thousand people completed the entire route each year.

The Kintyre Way ultramarathon has been held annually along parts of the route since 2007. Originally held over a 108 km (67 mi) course between Tarbert and Campbeltown, a shorter 56 km (35 mi) route from Tayinloan to Campbeltown was later introduced. Due to the relative popularity of the two routes, the longer course is no longer run. The 2016 edition of the race featured in an episode of BBC Scotland's The Adventure Show. For 2019 the route of the race will be changed again, utilising a 51 km (32 mi) section between Tayinloan and Tarbert.

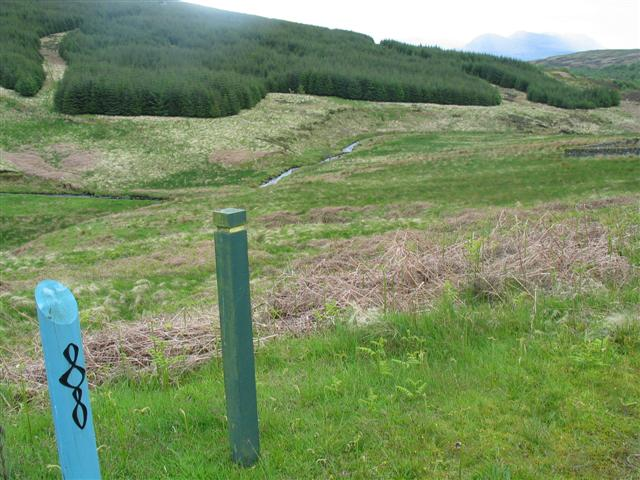
Waymarking on the Kintyre Way.
