= Rob Roy MacGregor =

Scottish Jacobite and outlaw (1671–1734)

Robert Roy MacGregor
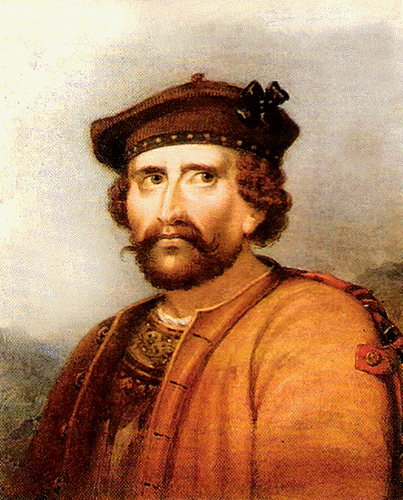
- An engraving of Rob Roy, c. 1820
- Born: Robert MacGregor; 7 March 1671; Loch Katrine, Perthshire, Scotland
- Died: 28 December 1734 (aged 63); Balquhidder, Perthshire, Scotland
- Other names: Robert Campbell (alias); Rob Roy
- Occupations: Soldier, cattle dealer
- Known for: Scottish folk hero
- Children: 4

Robert Roy MacGregor (Scottish Gaelic: Raibeart Ruadh MacGriogair; 7 March 1671 – 28 December 1734) was a Jacobite Scottish outlaw, who later became a Scottish and Jacobite folk hero.

== Early life ==
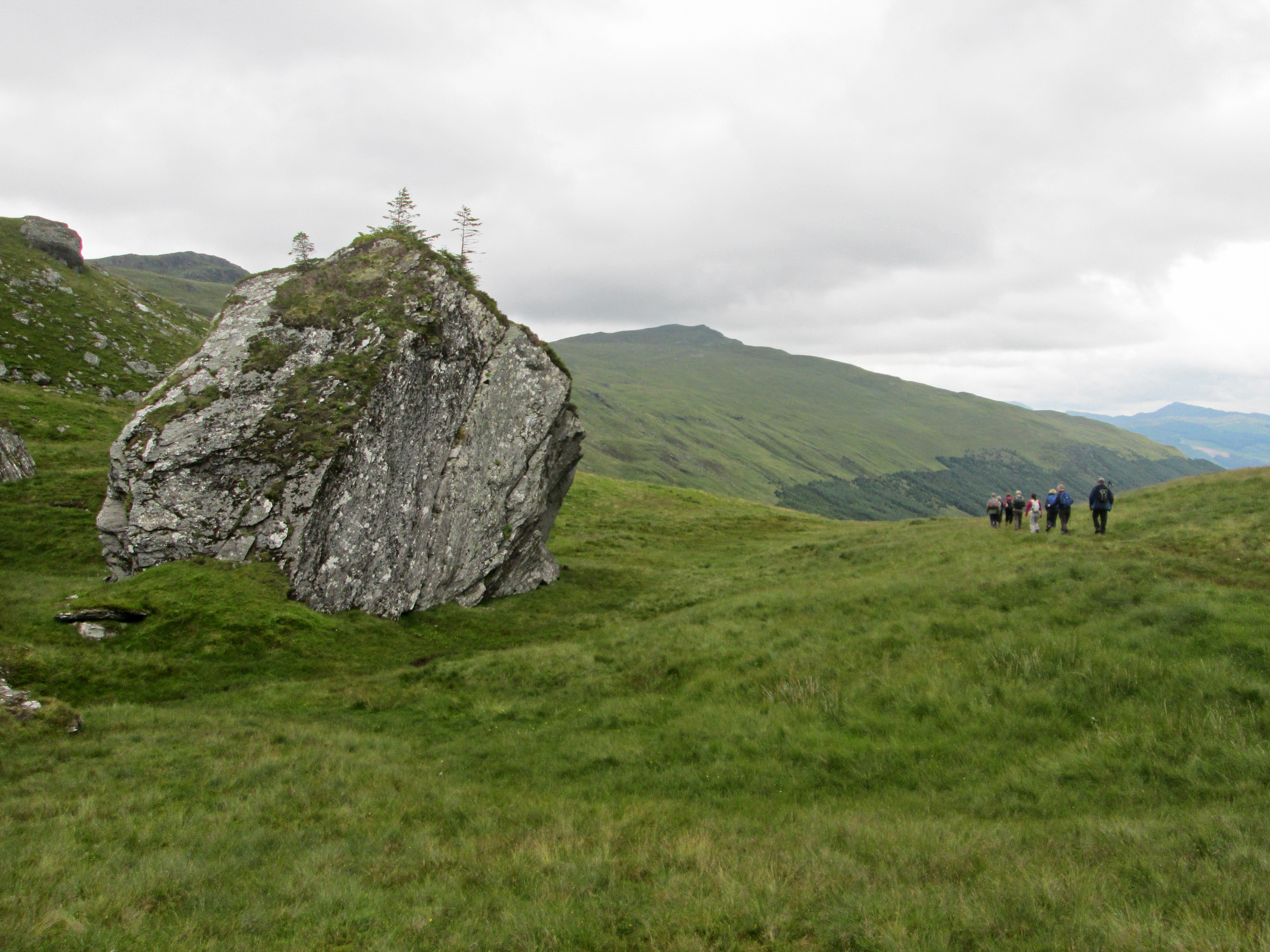
Rob Roy's Putting Stone, a boulder he supposedly used for stone putting, near Lochan nan Eireannaich at the head of Kirkton Glen where the pass leads from Balquhidder to Glen Dochart.

He was born in the Kingdom of Scotland at Glengyle, at the head of Loch Katrine, as recorded in the Church of Scotland baptismal register of Buchanan, Stirling. His parents were the local Clan MacGregor tacksman, Donald Glas MacGregor, and Margaret Campbell. He was also descended from the Clan MacDonald of Keppoch through his paternal grandmother. Because the name MacGregor was outlawed, Rob Roy sometimes went by his mother's name of Campbell. Roy, meaning red, was known for his red hair.

In January 1693, at Corrie Arklet farm near Inversnaid, he married Mary MacGregor of Comar (1671–1745), who was born at Leny Farm, Strathyre. The couple had four sons: James Mor MacGregor (1695–1754), Ranald (1706–1786), Coll (died 1735) and Robert (1715–1754), known as Robìn Òig or Young Rob. It has been argued that they also adopted a cousin named Duncan, but this is not certain.

== Jacobite risings ==
Along with many Highland clansmen, at the age of eighteen, Rob Roy MacGregor, together with his father, joined the Jacobite rising of 1689 led by John Graham, 1st Viscount Dundee and Sir Ewen Cameron of Lochiel to support the Stuart King James VII. James's flight from Britain following the Glorious Revolution of 1688 had been declared by the English Convention Parliament to be an abdication, and then in Scotland the Convention of Estates had adopted the Claim of Right and declared that James had forfeited the Scottish throne. Although victorious in initial battles, Dundee was killed at the Battle of Killiecrankie in 1689, deflating the rising which then lost the Battle of Dunkeld. Donald MacGregor was taken to jail, where he was held on high treason charges for two years. Margaret Campbell's health failed during Donald's time in prison. By the time Donald was finally released, his wife was dead.

Like many other Scottish clan chiefs during the 17th and 18th centuries, Rob Roy operated an extralegal Watch over the cattle herds of the Lowland gentry in return for black mail (protection money), which was used to feed the families of his tenants and clansmen. Any cattle that were stolen from herds under his Watch were either retrieved or paid for in full.

Rob Roy became a respected cattleman – this was a time when cattle raiding and protection rackets, selling protection against theft, were commonplace means of earning a living. MacGregor borrowed a large sum to increase his own cattle herd, but owing to the disappearance of his chief herder, who was entrusted with the money, MacGregor defaulted on his loan.

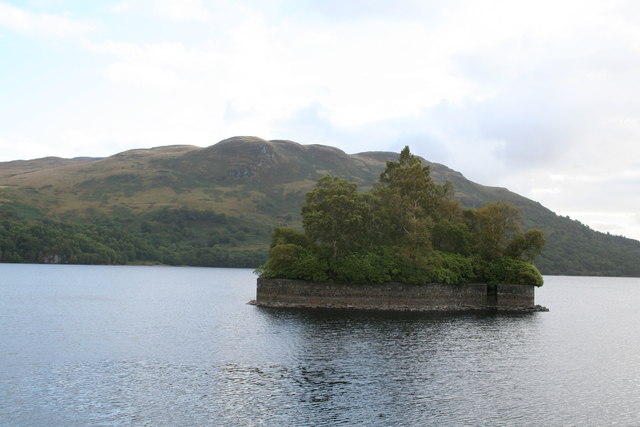
Factor's Island (Gaelic: Eilean a' Bhàillidh), Loch Katrine, where Rob Roy once imprisoned the Duke's factor.

His principal creditor, James Graham, 1st Duke of Montrose, then seized his lands. In a letter later circulated on his behalf and widely believed at the time, Rob Roy alleged that Montrose had twice offered to forgive his debts in return for perjured testimony that would help to frame John Campbell, 2nd Duke of Argyll for both high treason and Jacobitism. Rob Roy further claimed that when he indignantly refused, he was branded an outlaw, and his wife and family were evicted from their house at Inversnaid, which was then burned down. Rob Roy made also similar allegations against John Murray, 1st Duke of Atholl, which he also indignantly refused. In retaliation, Rob Roy waged a private blood feud against Montrose, both raiding his cattle and robbing his rents.

Another version states that Rob Roy's estates of Craigrostan and Ardess were forfeited for his part in the Jacobite rising of 1715. The Duke of Montrose then acquired the property in 1720 by open purchase from the Commissioners of Enquiry.

== Glen Shira ==
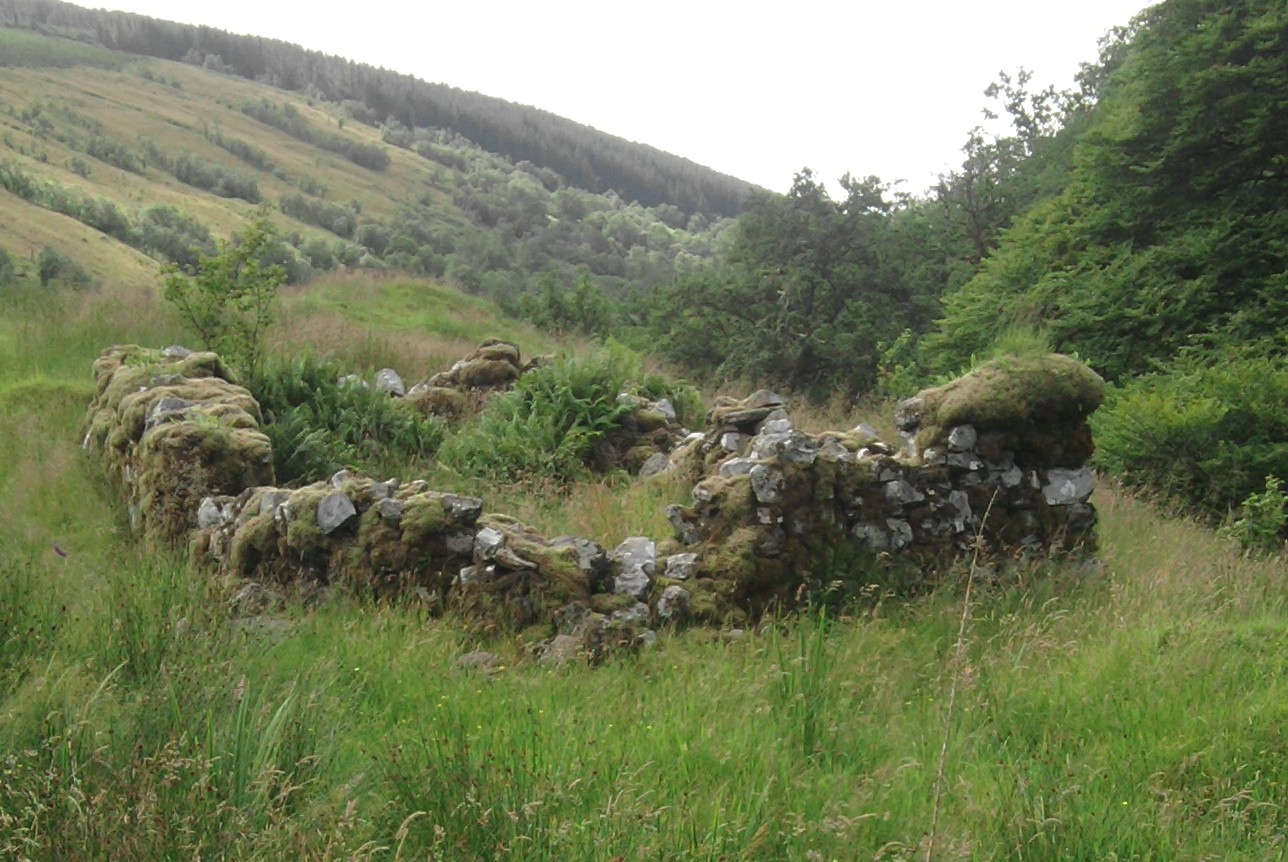
The remains of Rob Roy MacGregor's house in upper Glen Shira

Despite having fought on opposing sides during the 1715 rising, Rob Roy and his family moved immediately afterwards to Glen Shira, where they lived under the protection of John Campbell, 2nd Duke of Argyll. Argyll sought to negotiate an amnesty and protection for MacGregor. When Rob Roy's allegations about the reasons for his outlawry were made public by the Duke, it was widely believed, according to a surviving letter by a Church of Scotland minister, that Montrose and Atholl were both part of a plot by Argyll's enemies in the House of Lords and at Court.

The Duke also granted him permission to build a house in the Glen for the surrendering up of weapons, "Traditionally the story goes that Argyll only received a large cache of rusty old weapons." A sporran and dirk handle which belonged to Rob Roy may still be seen at Inveraray Castle. He allegedly continued to use Glen Shira as a base for cattle raiding against the Montrose estates and despite repeated demands from the latter, Argyll refused to hand Rob Roy MacGregor over or otherwise curb his activities.

In July 1717, Rob Roy and the whole of the Clan Gregor were specifically excluded from the benefits of the Indemnity Act 1717 which pardoned all others who took part in the Jacobite rising of 1715.

Rob Roy participated in the Battle of Glen Shiel in 1719, in which a British Government army with allied Highlanders defeated a force of Jacobite Scots supported by the Spanish. Two of the Jacobite commanders, Lord George Murray and the 5th Earl of Seaforth, were badly wounded. Some accounts claim that Rob Roy himself was wounded, but the actual text of Ormonde's account of the battle provides no evidence for this claim. Instead, it states that Seaforth was wounded: "Finding himself hard-pressed, Lord Seaforth sent for further support. A reinforcement under Rob Roy went to his aid, but before it reached him the greater part of his men had given way, and he himself had been severely wounded in the arm."

Sometime around 1720 and after the heat of Rob Roy MacGregor's involvement at the Battle of Glen Shiel had died down, he moved to Monachyle Tuarach by Loch Doine. Sometime before 1722, he finally moved to Inverlochlarig Beag on the Braes of Balquhidder.

== Later life ==
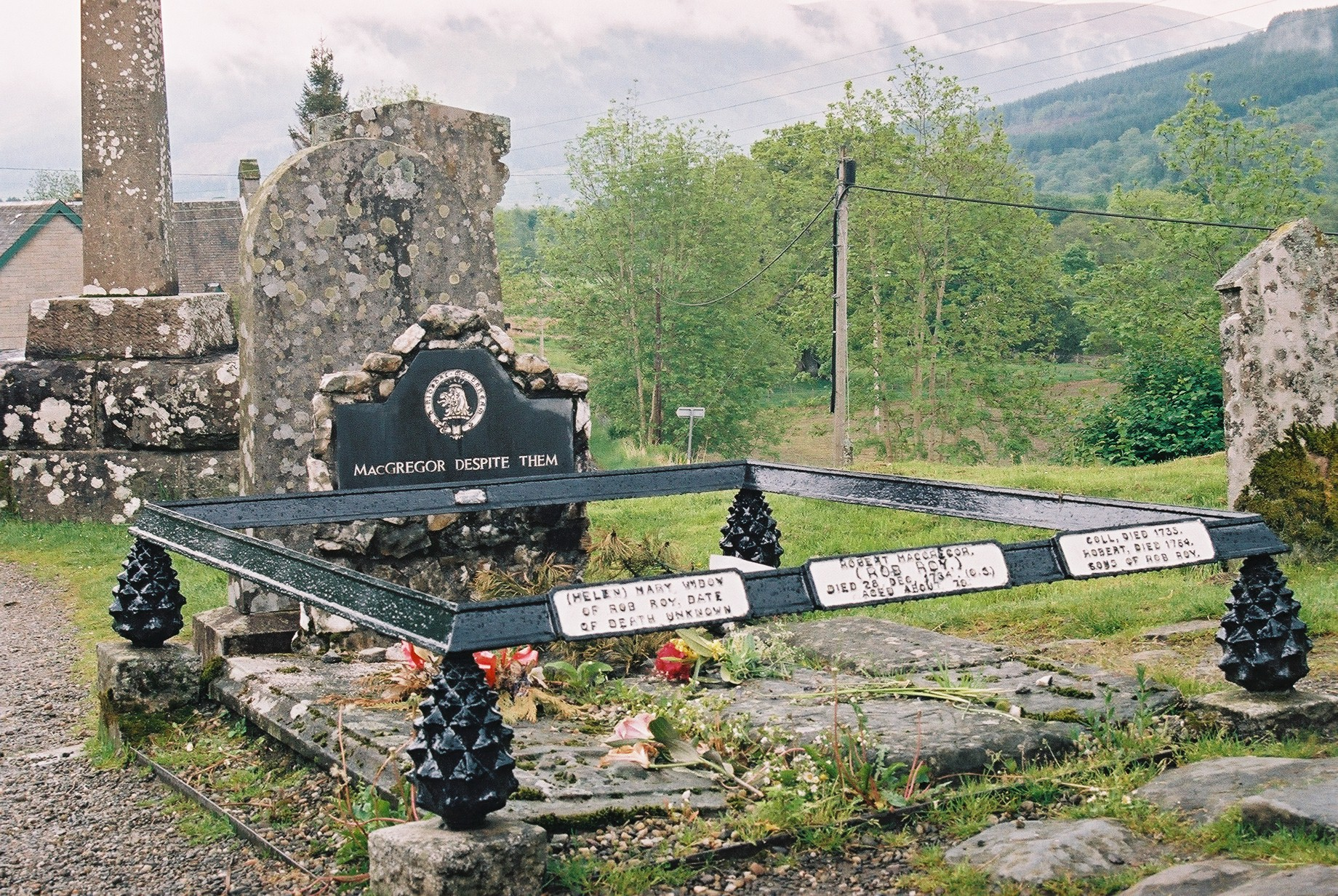
Grave site of Rob Roy MacGregor, marking his wife (Helen) Mary, and sons Coll and Robert (Balquhidder)

Rob Roy's feud against the Duke of Montrose continued until 1722, when he was forced to surrender. Later imprisoned, he was finally pardoned in 1727. He died in his house at Inverlochlarig Beg, Balquhidder, on 28 December 1734 after an illness brought on by old age and a bad winter, aged 63.

K. Macleay, M.D., in Historical Memoirs of Rob Roy and the Clan MacGregor quotes, "but he had taken the resolution of becoming a Catholic, and he accordingly left the lonely residence we have described, and returning to Perthshire, went to a Mr. Alexander Drummond, an old priest of that faith, who resided at Drummond Castle." Macleay takes the view that Rob Roy did this out of sorrow for his crimes.

== Legacy ==
Glengyle House, on the shore of Loch Katrine, dates back to the early 18th century, with a porch dated to 1707, and is built on the site of the 17th century stone cottage where Rob Roy is said to have been born. Since the 1930s, the Category B-listed building had been in the hands of successive water authorities, but was identified as surplus to requirements and put up for auction in November 2004, despite objections from the Scottish National Party.

The Rob Roy Way, a long distance footpath from Drymen to Pitlochry, was created in 2002 and named in Rob Roy's honour.

Descendants of Rob Roy settled around McGregor, Iowa, United States, and in 1849 it was reported that the original MacGregor seal and signet was owned by Alex McGregor of Iowa. The Scots Gaelic clan seal was inscribed "S' Rioghal Mo Dhream" ("Royal is my race"). The signet was a bloodstone from Loch Lomond, and was sketched by William Williams.

In 1878, the football club Kirkintilloch Rob Roy was founded and named in his memory.

Early settlers to New Zealand named Rob Roy Peak and Rob Roy Glacier in honour of Rob Roy MacGregor.

Japanese thoroughbred racehorse Zenno Rob Roy was named after Rob Roy, and became famous for his unbeaten record winning time of 2:29.5 at the 2004 Arima Kinen.

== In popular culture ==
Rob Roy on the Rock, a statue located on the spot where Rob Roy leapt across the Culter Burn, Peterculter, Aberdeen, while on the run from Montrose's men

A fictionalised account of his life, The Highland Rogue, was published in 1723. Rob Roy became a legend in his own lifetime and George I was moved to issue a pardon for his crimes just as he was about to be transported to the colonies. The publication of Rob Roy by Sir Walter Scott in 1817 further added to his fame and fleshed out his biography. Hector Berlioz was inspired by the book to compose an overture. William Wordsworth wrote a poem called "Rob Roy's Grave" during a visit to Scotland; the 1803 tour was documented by his sister Dorothy in Recollections of a Tour Made in Scotland and the editor of the book changed the place of burial to the present location.

Adaptations of his story have also been told in film, including the silent film Rob Roy (1922), the Walt Disney Productions film Rob Roy: The Highland Rogue (1953) and the 1995 film Rob Roy directed by Michael Caton-Jones (starring Liam Neeson as the title character and shot entirely on location in the Scottish Highlands). The 1995 Rob Roy film was also novelised in that year by Donald McFarlan (based on the screenplay by Alan Sharp) and adapted to a Nova abridged audiobook read by British actor Brian Cox, who also appeared in the film.

In 1894, a bartender at the Waldorf Hotel in New York City created the Rob Roy cocktail in honour of the premiere of Rob Roy, an operetta by composer Reginald De Koven and lyricist Harry B. Smith loosely based upon Robert Roy MacGregor.

In 2017, a new statue of Rob Roy was commissioned to be installed in Peterculter, Aberdeen. The sculptor appointed was David J. Mitchell, a graduate of Grays School of Art in Aberdeen. The statue was publicly unveiled at a ceremony on the bridge on 16 September 2017.

== Bibliography ==
- Defoe, Daniel (1723). The highland rogue: or, The memorable actions of the celebrated Robert Macgregor, commonly called Rob-Roy. OCLC 176650784.
- Macleay, Kenneth (1881). Historical memoirs of Rob Roy and the Clan Macgregor. [With plates.] Edinburgh: W. Brown. OCLC 316575085.
- Murray, W. H. (1996). Rob Roy MacGregor, His Life and Times (3rd ed.). Canongate books Ltd.
- Stevenson, David (2004). The Hunt for Rob Roy, The Man and the Myths. John Donald Publishers. ISBN 0-85976-590-3.
- Tranter, Nigel (1991). Rob Roy MacGregor (2005 reprint ed.). New York: Barnes and Noble. ISBN 1-897784-31-7.
