= Drymen =

Coordinates: 56.06496°N 4.45107°W

Drymen: Scottish Gaelic: Druiminn
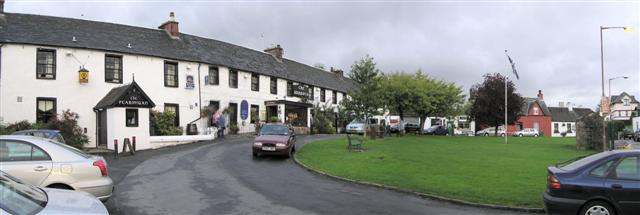
- The Square, Drymen

- Location within the Stirling council area
- Population: 830 (2020)
- OS grid reference: NS475885
  - Edinburgh: 49 mi (79 km)
  - London: 361 mi (581 km)
- Civil parish: Drymen
- Council area: Stirling
- Lieutenancy area: Stirling and Falkirk
- Country: Scotland
- Sovereign state: United Kingdom
- Post town: GLASGOW
- Postcode district: G63
- Dialling code: 01360
- Police: Scotland
- Fire: Scottish
- Ambulance: Scottish
- UK Parliament: Stirling and Strathallan
- Scottish Parliament: Stirling

Drymen (/ˈdrɪmɪn/; from Scottish Gaelic: Druiminn [ˈt̪ɾɯmɪɲ]) is a village in the Stirling district of central Scotland. Once a popular stopping place for cattle drovers, it is now favored by visiting tourists given its location near Loch Lomond. The village is centred around a village green, which is an unusual feature in Scottish villages but more common in other parts of the United Kingdom.

== Location ==
Drymen is located west of the Campsie Fells and enjoys views to Dumgoyne on the east and to Loch Lomond on the west. The Queen Elizabeth Forest reaches down to the village edge, and the whole area is part of the Loch Lomond and The Trossachs National Park (the first national park in Scotland).

== History ==
There is remains of a medieval motte-and-bailey castle in the village.

In the 18th and 19th centuries Drymen was used as a stopover point for Highland cattle drovers as they made their way to and from markets in central Scotland.

One mile from Drymen is the ruins of the country house Buchanan Castle, owned by the Duke of Montrose, which was also used as a hospital in World War II, and which housed Nazi senior officer Rudolf Hess. At one time the estate was also home to the seat of Clan Graham.

The Clachan Inn, which was first licensed in 1734 claims to be one of the oldest pubs in Scotland. The first licensee of the inn is said to be Rob Roy MacGregor's sister Mistress Gow.

== Village today ==
Despite the growth in the numbers of villagers commuting to Glasgow to work, there remains an agricultural tradition in the area. Every year, in early summer, an agricultural show is held in the fields around the Endrick Water.

It is often used as an overnight stop for hikers on the West Highland Way, and forms the western end of the Rob Roy Way. There are a couple of pubs and a walkers' shop.

In 2019 planning permission was given for a residential development for over eighty new homes. As part of the development a financial contribution was made for improvements for the local primary school to increase its capacity.

== Notable people ==
- Duncan Macfarlan, minister of Drymen church and principal of the University of Glasgow.
- Catherine Roy, decorated World War I military nurse.
- Billy Connolly, lived in the village during the 1970s.
