= Inveruglas =

Hamlet in Argyll and Bute, Scotland

Coordinates: 56.250021°N 4.7131245°W

Inveruglas: Scottish Gaelic: Inbhir Dhubhghlais
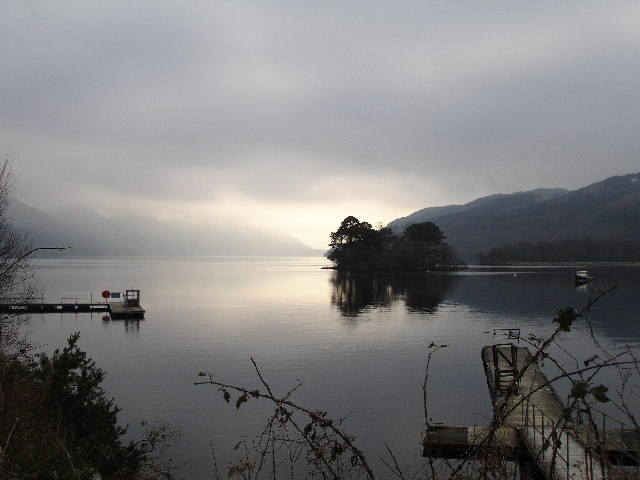
- Inveruglas, Loch Lomond - geograph.org.uk - 120041

- Location within Argyll and Bute
- OS grid reference: NN 32000 09700
- Council area: Argyll and Bute
- Lieutenancy area: Argyll and Bute
- Country: Scotland
- Sovereign state: United Kingdom
- Post town: Alexandria
- Postcode district: G83
- Dialling code: 01301
- UK Parliament: Argyll, Bute and South Lochaber
- Scottish Parliament: Argyll and Bute

Inveruglas (Scottish Gaelic: Inbhir Dhubhghlais) is a hamlet on the west shore of Loch Lomond, fairly near the north end of the loch and is within the Loch Lomond and The Trossachs National Park. It is situated on the A82 trunk road, connecting Glasgow to Inverness. It is within the historic county of Dunbartonshire, and since 1996 it has been part of the Argyll and Bute council area.

Nearby isles include Inveruglas Isle and Wallace's Isle. Inversnaid is roughly opposite on the east shore, there is a pedestrian ferry.

The Inveruglas Water flows into the loch at the hamlet, flowing down from Loch Sloy. The name of this watercourse is a curious back-formation, since Inveruglas means "the mouth of the Douglas". It may have acquired this name to differentiate it from the Douglas Water a few miles further south.

Inveruglas Isle lies in Inveruglas Bay, an inlet of Loch Lomond.

== Loch Lomond and Cowal Way ==
The Loch Lomond and Cowal Way starts and finishes at Inveruglas. This 92-kilometre (57-mile) waymarked footpath terminates at Portavadie in the Cowal Peninsula, on the east shore of Loch Fyne.

== Loch Sloy Hydro-Electric Scheme ==
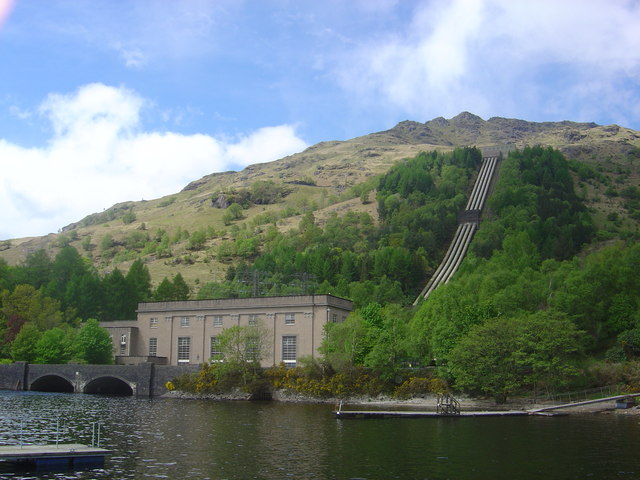
Loch Sloy hydro-electric power station - geograph.org.uk - 173508

The renewable hydroelectric schemes generation hall is located on the shore of Loch Lomond at Inveruglas, part of the Sloy/Awe Hydro-Electric Scheme. Opened by Queen Elizabeth in 1950.
