= Inversnaid =

Coordinates: 56.244°N 4.683°W

Inversnaid: Scottish Gaelic: Inbhir Snàthaid
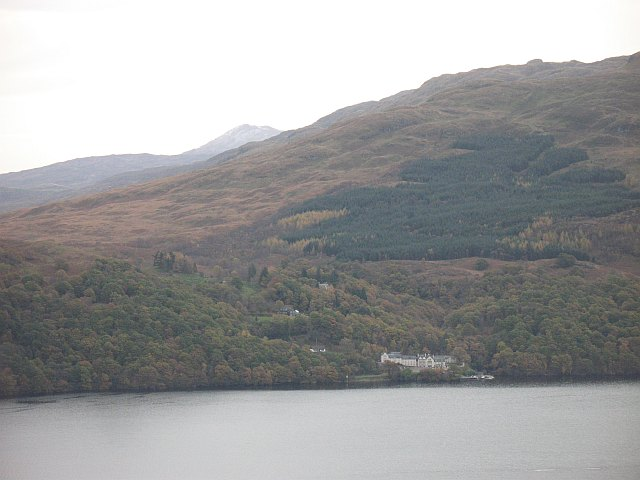
- Inversnaid viewed from across Loch Lomond, with Ben Venue in the background

- Location within the Stirling council area
- OS grid reference: NN337089
- Civil parish: Buchanan
- Council area: Stirling
- Lieutenancy area: Stirling and Falkirk
- Country: Scotland
- Sovereign state: United Kingdom
- Post town: STIRLING
- Postcode district: FK8
- Dialling code: 01877
- Police: Scotland
- Fire: Scottish
- Ambulance: Scottish
- UK Parliament: Stirling
- Scottish Parliament: Stirling

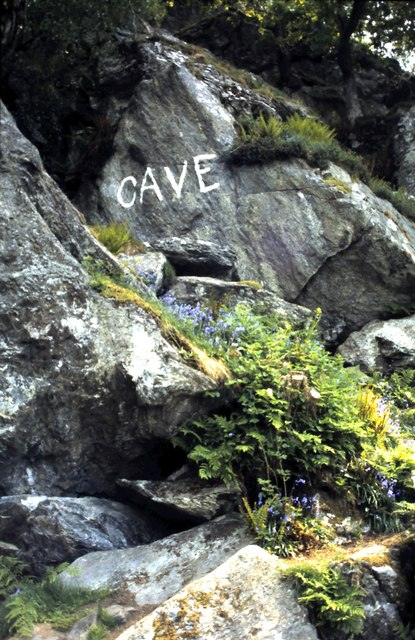
Rob Roy's Cave

Inversnaid (Scottish Gaelic: Inbhir Snàthaid) is a small rural community on the east bank of Loch Lomond in Scotland, near the north end of the loch. It has a pier and a hotel, and the West Highland Way passes through the area. A small passenger ferry runs from Inversnaid to Inveruglas on the opposite shore of the loch, and also to Tarbet. There is a seasonal ferry that also operates between Ardlui and Ardleish as well, which is a walkable distance from Inversnaid. To reach Inversnaid by road involves a 15-mile (24-kilometre) route from Aberfoyle. Nearby is an alleged hideout of Rob Roy MacGregor known as Rob Roy's Cave. The cave is difficult to access, and is best seen from Loch Lomond, where there is white paint indicating the location of the hideout.

== Inversnaid Hotel ==
The Inversnaid Hotel is situated on the banks of Loch Lomond, next to Arklet Falls and on the West Highland Way. The hotel was built in 1790 for the Duke of Montrose as a hunting lodge.

The hotel offers food & drinks to hikers on the West Highland Way in a separate extension to the building. It offers chartered tours of the area. The hotel has had many distinguished guests including authors William Wordsworth and Sir Walter Scott, Queen Victoria, and later American writer Nathaniel Hawthorne and English poet Gerard Manley Hopkins.

== Inversnaid Bunkhouse ==
The Inversnaid Bunkhouse is a hostel with restaurant facilities situated 1 km off the West Highland Way and Loch Lomond. The hostel was converted from the original church building, St. Kentigerna's Parish Church, in the 1990s as an outdoor centre for the Boys' Brigade into its present configuration. The original stained glass is on display in the restaurant on the upper floor.

== Garrison Farm ==
The historic Garrison of Inversnaid that was established by the Duke of Montrose during the time of Rob Roy MacGregor is now a working farm that also offers Bed & Breakfast accommodation, year round.

== RSPB Reserve ==
While most of the surrounding countryside is part of the Loch Lomond and The Trossachs National Park, and is also under the stewardship of the Woodland Trust, a large portion of the hill and loch side in and around Inversnaid, specifically on the northern side, is given over to an open nature reserve established and maintained by the RSPB.

== School ==
Due to having only two pupils Inversnaid Primary School made headlines in 2010 when it was deemed to cost £54,000 per pupil, making it the most expensive primary school in the UK on a per capita basis. The following year the school was closed and the building put up for sale by Stirling Council.
