= Archibald Kay =

Scottish artist (1860–1935)

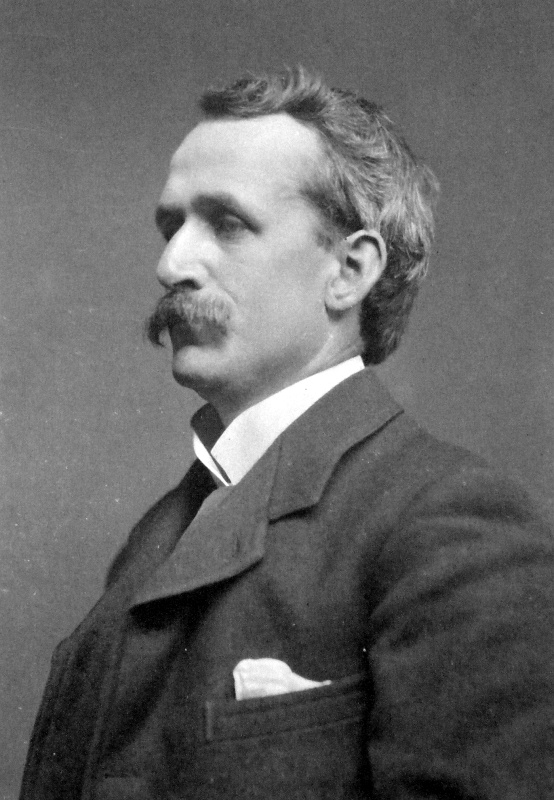
Archibald Kay RSA RSW pictured around 1920

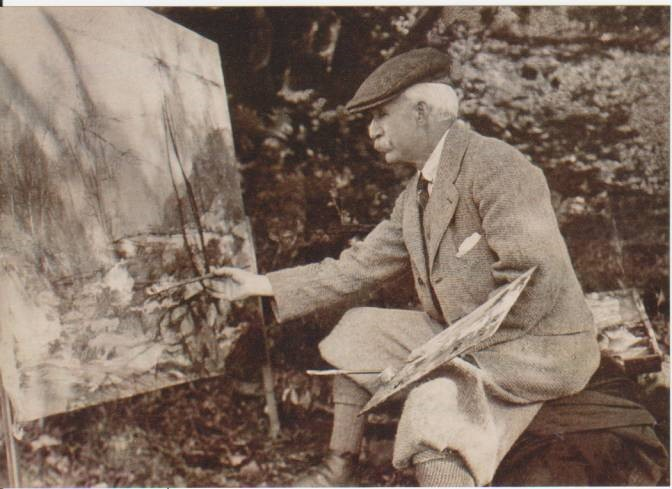
Archibald Kay RSW at his easel on the River Leny near Callendar around 1930

Archibald Kay RSA RSW (4 September 1860 – 6 September 1935) was a Scottish painter of landscapes of the Scottish Highlands. Many of his paintings are held in private hands but also by the national museums and galleries of Scotland.

== Early life ==
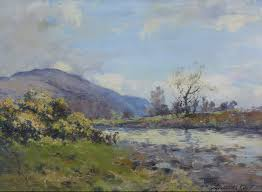
Scottish Highland scene

Born on 4 September 1860 in Glasgow, he showed talent as an artist from an early age. He went to work for Peterson & Co. at the age of 14 but was so driven by his love for art that he joined a local art school before becoming a full time professional artist. Kay studied at the Glasgow College of Art and the Académie Julian in Paris. His tutor at the Glasgow College of Art was Robert Greenlees. In 1882 Kay was listed as living at 294 St Vincent Street with his studio in West Regent Street. In 1882 he moved his studio to 120 Mains Street where he remained until 1891.

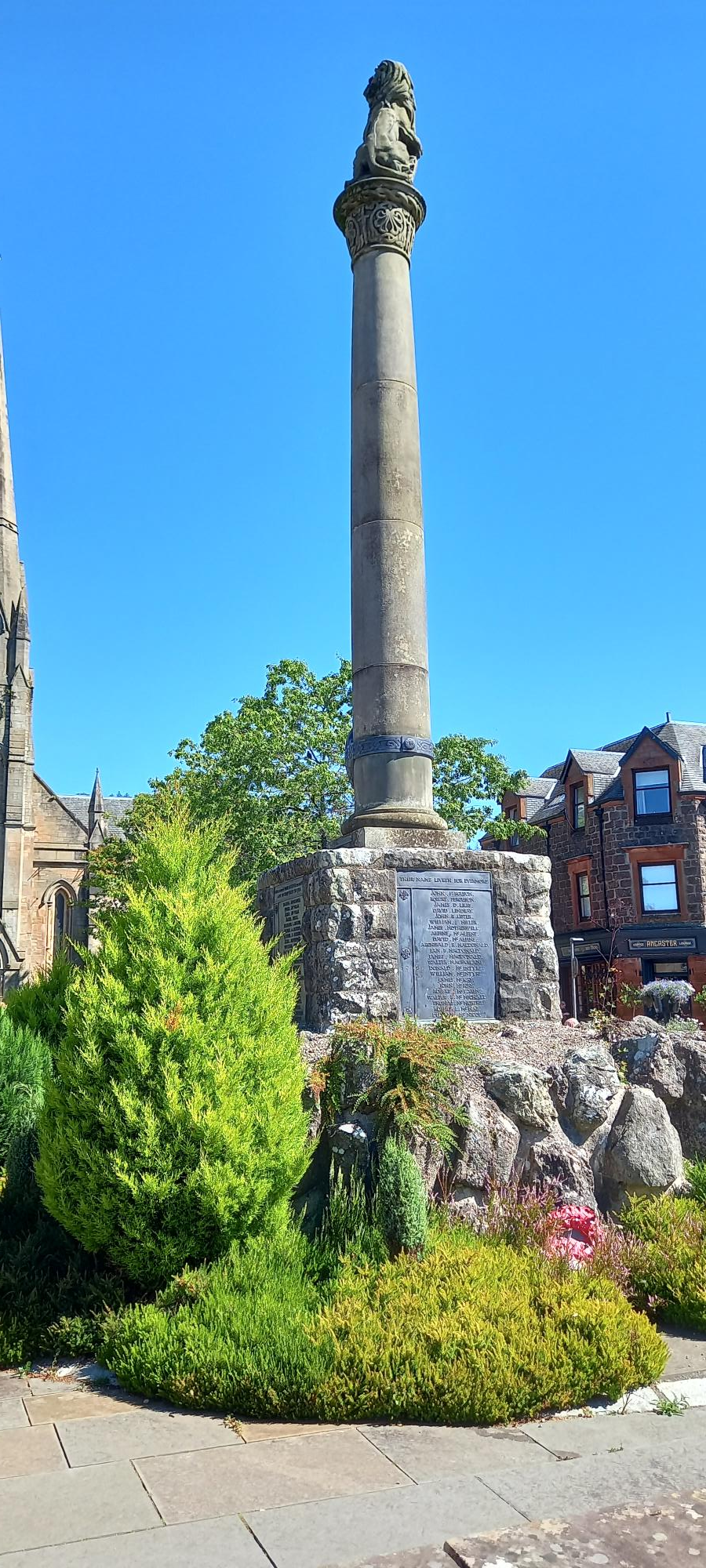
The war memorial in Callandar, Perthshire, designed by Archibald Kay

== Early career ==
To improve his draughtsmanship, Kay went to Paris where he studied under Gustave Boulanger who held a strong dislike of Impressionism; hence Kay was a realist painter. By 1892 he had been admitted into the Royal Scottish Society of Painters in Watercolour (RSW). A close friend of Rennie Mackintosh, Kay was a popular member of the art scene in turn of the century Glasgow.

He married Mary Margaret Thompson, and their son Archibald Alexander was born in 1895. In 1911, the census records them as living at 11 Berkeley Terrace. By 1903, Kay was exhibiting works in London and Paris, but he also sold to buyers in Germany and Italy. In Venice he sold paintings to the King of Italy and in 1904 he was invited by the Royal Commission to send two paintings to the International Exhibition in St Louis and in 1906 to Christchurch, New Zealand.

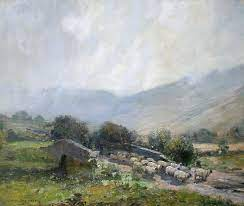
One of the typical Highland scenes painted by Archibald Kay

From 1903-1904 Kay was elected vice president of the Glasgow Art Club and became president for 1904-1905. Archibald Kay was an Associate of the Royal Scottish Academy in 1916 and was made a full member in 1931. Kay worked alongside many notable Scottish artists of the early modernist period such as Thomas Hunt, Joseph Morris Henderson, George Houston and Helen Russell Salmon.

== Tragedy ==
Kay lived in Kilmahog near Callander for 20 years. The whole area become the palette for his paintings, especially the waterfalls and weirs of the River Lenny and Ben Ledi.

In 1907, Kay's son, Archibald Alexander, who was aged 12, and his cousin George Whitelaw who was aged 56, died in a drowning accident at Port Appin.

In future years, Kay became leader of the Callander Boys' Brigade and designed the community war memorial after The Great War.

== Later life, legacy and death ==
Archibald Kay created over 500 paintings during his career, the majority in oil but also numerous watercolours. Kay is listed in The Dictionary of Victorian Painters and other publications. His main area of interest was the river Leny and the Trossachs, where his autumnal scenes of vibrant running water and trees with vivid leaf colours became the hallmark of his works. He also painted a suite of five paintings which focussed on the roadstone quarry at Furnace on the shore of Loch Fyne in Argyll. These paintings immortalise the grand scale and labour of the quarries which provided the stone for the roads and tramways of expanding Glasgow. The Glasgow School of Art also has a collection of five paintings by Archibald Kay.

Archibald Kay married in Glasgow for a second time to Margaret Moir on 4 March 1931. Throughout 1935 Kay suffered from an attack of Malta Disease, or Brucellosis, and he died at home at 16 Kensington Gate on 6 September 1935. His grave was rediscovered in Callander Cemetery in 2022. In a poor state of repair, Archibald Kay is buried alongside his son, George Whitelaw and his first wife. In March 2023 a new book by Philip Kay-Bujak was published entitled 'My Heart is in the Highlands' (ISBN 9780992690724).
