= Falls of Leny =

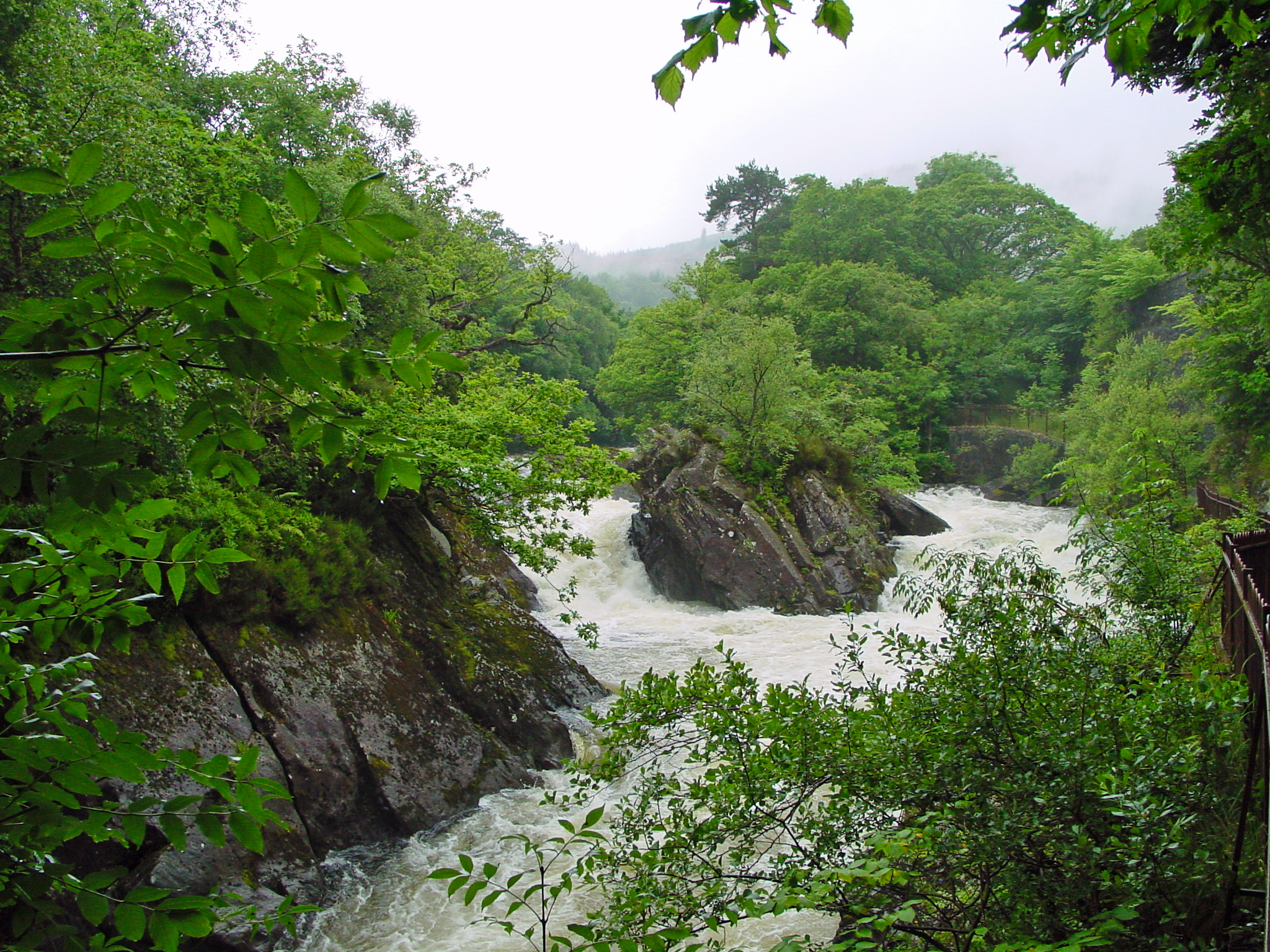
- Falls of Leny

- Location within Scotland
- Location: Callander, Stirling, Scotland
- Coordinates: 56.24989°N 4.27401°W
- Watercourse: Garbh Uisge

The Falls of Leny are a series of waterfalls in the Trossachs of Scotland on the course of the Garbh Uisge, otherwise known as the River Leny, where the river crosses the Highland Boundary Fault. The falls are located near the Pass of Leny, just north-west of Callander.

== Etymology ==
The name Leny may be Gaelic in origin, and derived from lanaigh meaning "boggy meadow".

== Nature conservation ==
The waterfall and its surrounding area belongs to the Loch Lomond and The Trossachs National Park.

== See also ==
- Waterfalls of Scotland
