= Loch Venachar =

Lake in Stirlingshire, Scotland

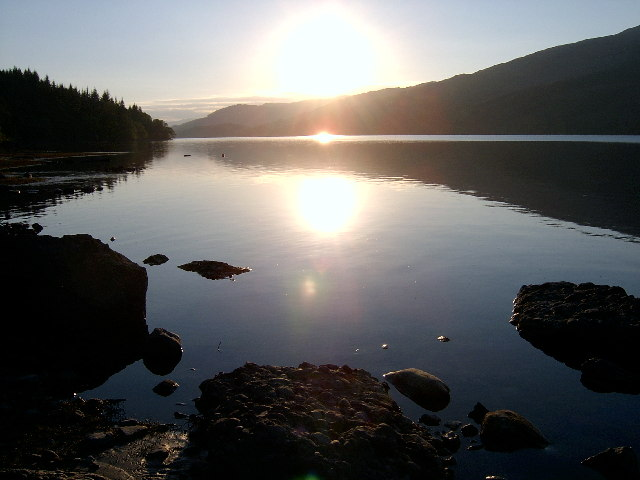
- Early morning view

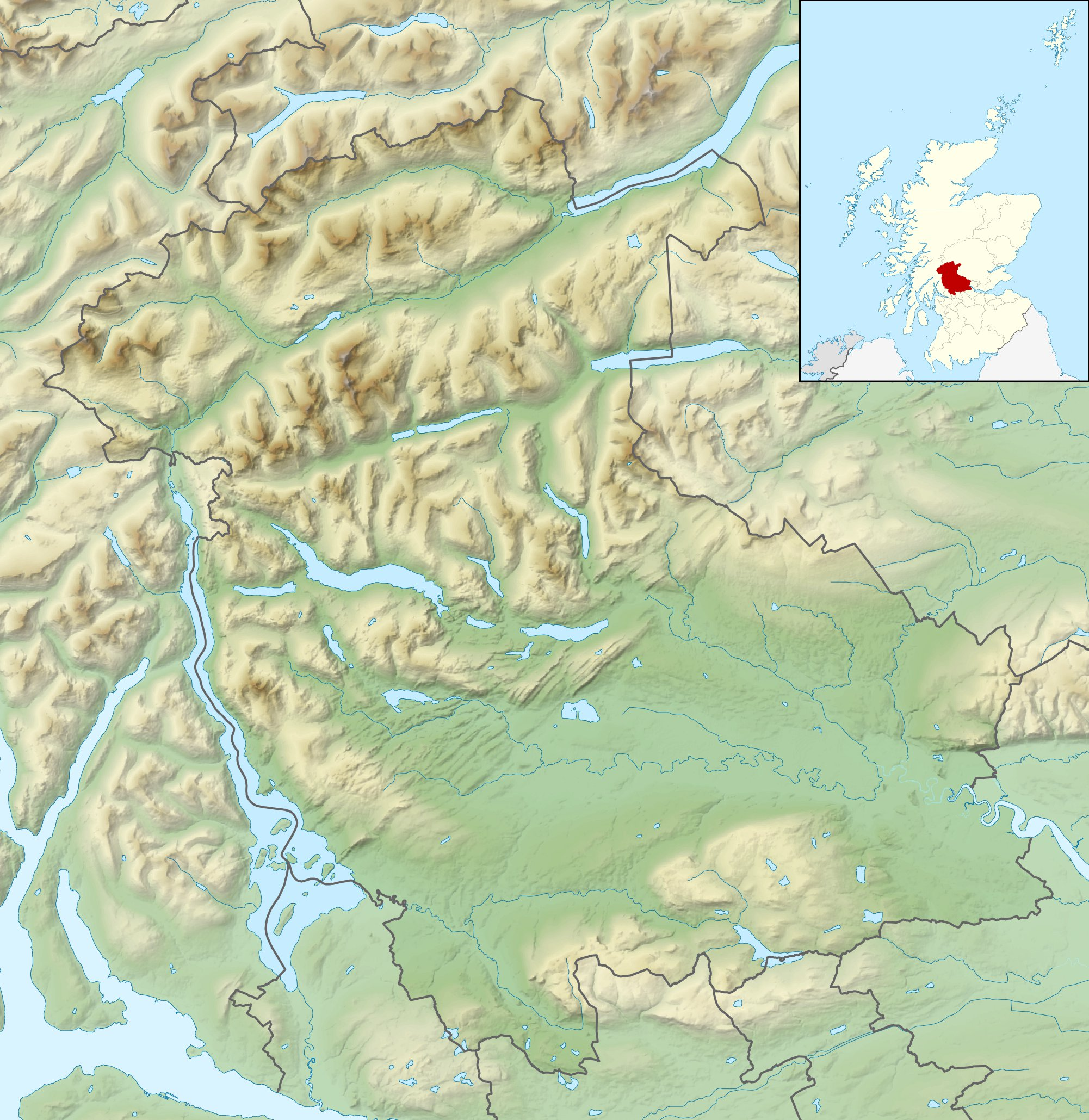
- Location within Stirling
- Location: Callander, Perthshire, Scotland
- Coordinates: 56.22076°N 4.30226°W
- Type: freshwater loch
- Primary inflows: Black Water
- Primary outflows: Eas Gobhain
- Basin countries: United Kingdom
- Max. length: 6 km (3.7 mi)
- Max. depth: 33 m (108 ft)
- Surface elevation: 82 m (269 ft)

Loch Venachar (Scottish Gaelic: Loch Bheannchair) is a freshwater loch in Stirling district, Scotland.

== Geography ==
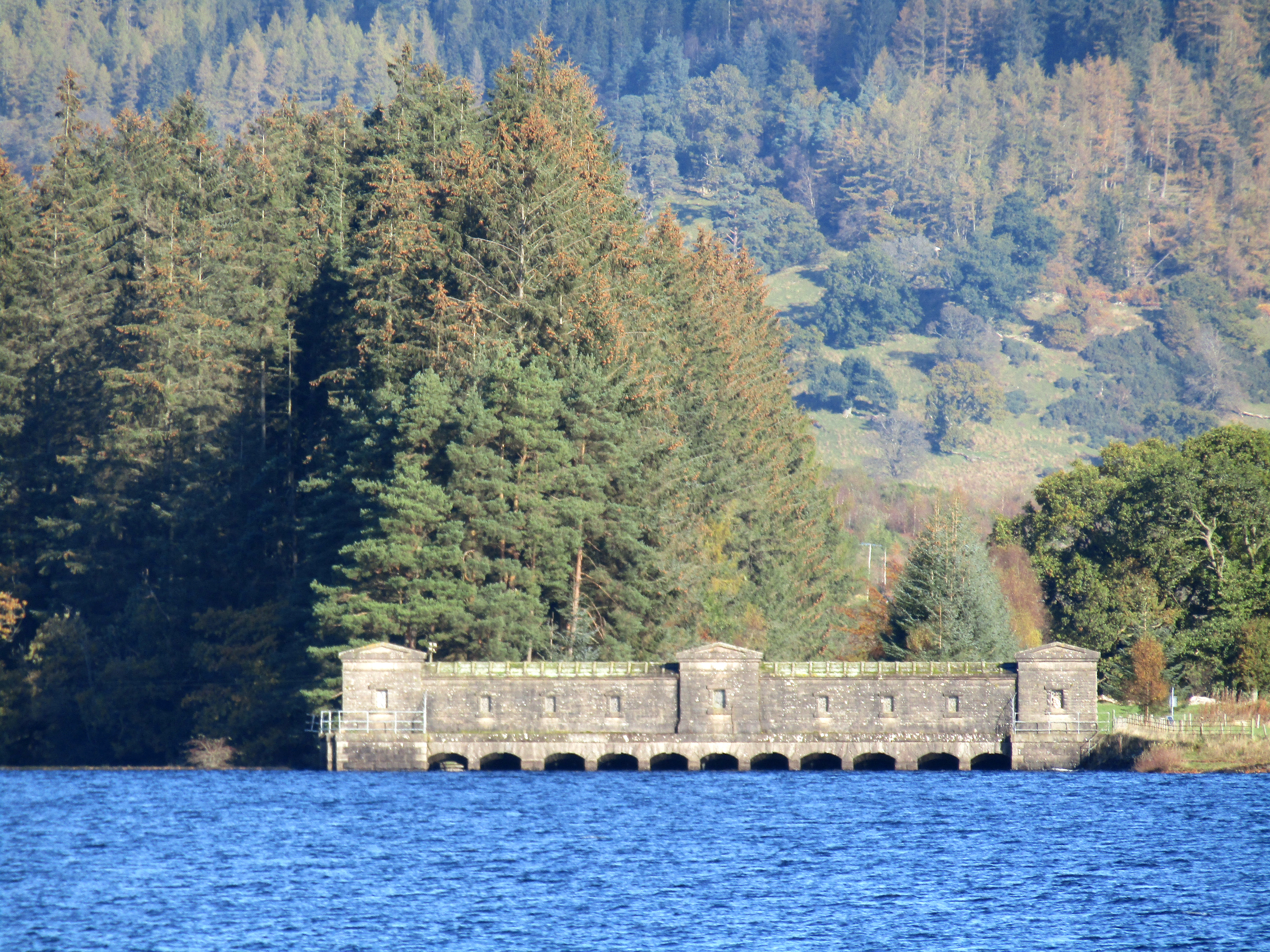
The old dam

The loch is situated between Callander and Brig o' Turk. It lies approximately 82 metres (269 ft) above sea level, and is 6 kilometres (3.7 mi) long with a maximum depth of approximately 33 metres (108 ft).

The Black Water discharges from Loch Achray into the western end of Loch Venachar, and at the eastern end emerges the Eas Gobhain which joins with the Garbh Uisge (River Leny) at Callander to form the River Teith. A small dam, which controls the water level, was built in the 19th century by John F. Bateman and is now a Listed building.

An island in the loch, Portnellan island, is an Iron Age crannog and has been designated as a Scheduled Ancient Monument.

The south shore of the loch is covered by woodland containing numerous forest tracks, some leading over the hills to the Lake of Menteith and some leading westward along the loch to Loch Achray and the Trossachs. The woodland landscape of the Invertrossachs estate was further developed during the later 19th century following the purchase of the Invertrossachs estate in 1875 by George Addison Cox, who undertook extensive planting and estate improvements. By 1883, Thomas Hunter recorded that Cox had added about 200 acres of woodland, principally of larch, Scots pine and spruce, to the estate. Invertrossachs House, which was visited by Queen Victoria in 1869, is also located on the south shore.

In 1893 Malcolm Ferguson described a day on Loch Venachar and Invertrossachs House as occupying "a beautiful site on the brow of an elevated eminence overlooking the lake".

== Leisure ==
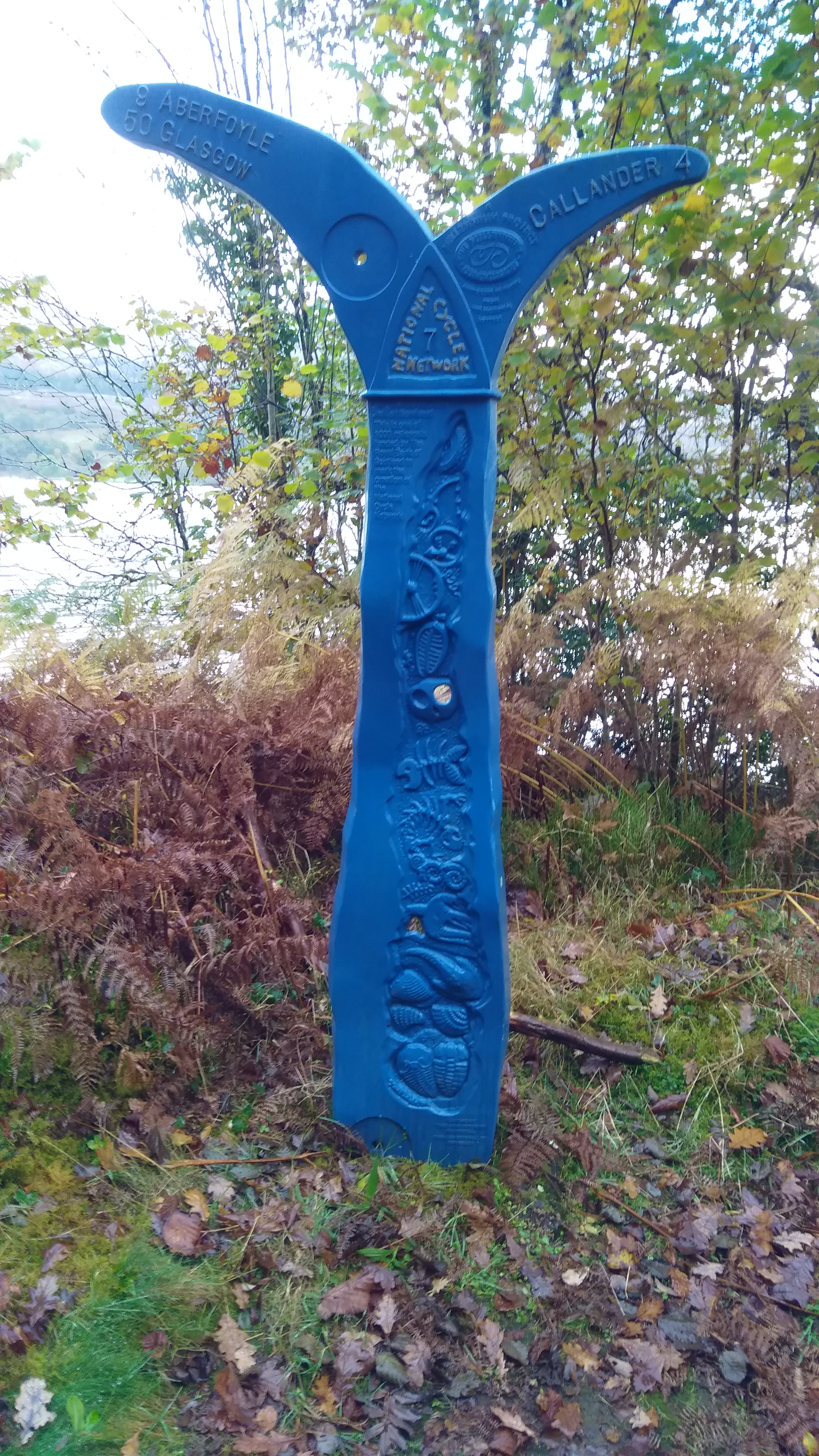
National Cycle Network sign on the South shore

Venachar sailing club is accessible from the Invertrossachs private road. This sailing club uses the loch for regular racing events between March and October. To the North of the loch is Ben Ledi, which at 879 metres (2,884 ft) is classified as a Corbett.

A brown trout stocking programme recommenced in 2016 under the management of the Loch Venachar Association and the loch also has stocks of pike, salmon, sea trout and perch. Fishing is available, by permit, from the shore and by boat.
