= Auchterarder (Parliament of Scotland constituency) =

Auchterarder was a constituency of the Parliament of Scotland.

== History ==
Auchterarder had been made a royal burgh in 1246, but the only known burgh commissioner was John Graham of Callander, who attended Parliament on 22 August 1584.
