= Doune =

Coordinates: 56.19°N 4.053°W

Doune: Scottish Gaelic: An Dùn
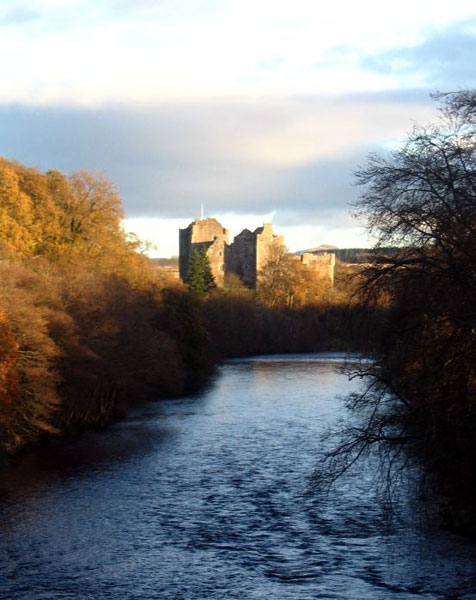

- Location within the Stirling council area
- Population: 2,200 (2020)
- OS grid reference: NN726016
- Civil parish: Kilmadock
- Council area: Stirling
- Lieutenancy area: Perthshire
- Country: Scotland
- Sovereign state: United Kingdom
- Post town: Doune
- Postcode district: FK16
- Dialling code: 01786
- Police: Scotland
- Fire: Scottish
- Ambulance: Scottish
- UK Parliament: Stirling and Strathallan
- Scottish Parliament: Stirling

Doune (/duːn/; from Scottish Gaelic: An Dùn, meaning 'the fort') is a burgh within Perthshire. The town is administered by Stirling Council. Doune is assigned Falkirk postcodes starting "FK". The village lies within the parish of Kilmadock and mainly within the area surrounded by the River Teith and Ardoch Burn.

In the 2001 Scottish census, 2.75% residents of Doune could speak Scottish Gaelic.

Doune has a small primary school with 183 pupils on the roll (June 2016), drawn from a catchment area which extends outside the town, especially to the north. It is located on the site of Doune Roman fort. Gaelic is taught in Primary 1–7 and Spanish is now taught from P5 upwards .

== History ==
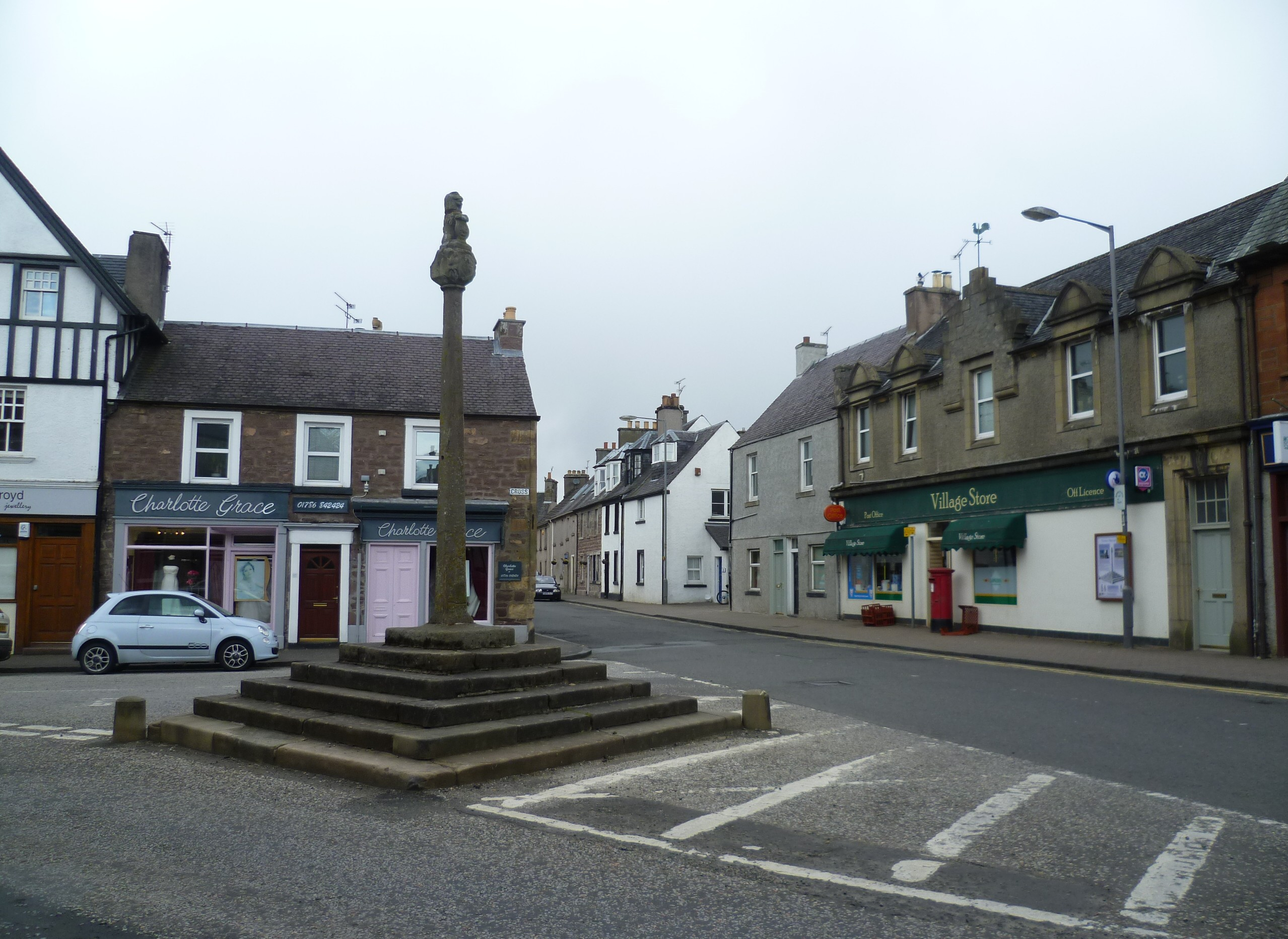
Village centre and mercat cross

The town is dominated by Doune Castle, built in the late 14th century. Architecturally it is a mixture of fortress and manor house.

Bonnie Prince Charlie passed through Doune in 1745.

Doune was also famous for its manufacture of pistols, but this eventually ceased due to the competition of manufacturers in, for example, Birmingham where production was cheaper. Today, these pistols are collected and can be found in major museums, including the Museum of Scotland in Edinburgh. Allegedly a Doune pistol fired the first shot of the American War of Independence.

Throughout the parish the names most often met with are Campbell, Stewart, Ferguson, Morrison, McAlpine, McLaren, MacDonald, Mathieson and Cameron.

Land east of Doune was owned by the Stirling of Keir family (who still own a lot of the land around Keir House, but sold the house itself), and the current owner of the Keir Estates is the politician Archie Stirling. One member of the family, SAS founder David Stirling, is memorialised at a monument on the Keir land near Doune known as the Hill o' Rou.

== Sports ==
The local amateur football team Doune Castle AFC play in the Caledonian Amateur Football League. The local cricket team play in the Strathmore & Perthshire Cricket Union.

== Archaeology ==
Photograph and reconstruction drawing of the bread oven, Doune, Roman Fort

Doune is well-known for its pistols and Roman remains, but the Doune area has been inhabited a lot longer and many burial mounds and standing stones supporting this are clearly evident and plentiful. To the rear of Doune where the ponds and the Doune Riggs housing development now sits was known locally as Currachmore. This area contained the bluebell wood, an area popular with walkers; it was also part of the Doune Golf course. This area was quarried and the sand coming from here was used in the construction of Longannet. Also lost to the quarrying was a mound measuring 150 yards (140 metres) long, 100 yd (90 m) wide and 30 ft (9 m) high, known locally as the Round Wood. At the time of quarrying, a stone cist or coffin was uncovered and in it were remains of a small boy aged 6, with a small stone axe. He was identified as one of the Beaker people of the early Bronze Age, c. 1800 BC.

The remains of a Roman fort were excavated by Headland Archaeology. Three ditches and the base of a rampart were investigated comprising part of the defence works. Set into the back of the rampart five circular stone bread ovens were located. Running behind the ovens a gravel track was interpreted as the intervallum way (one of the internal roads of the fort). The foundations of a building that it is thought served as the fort’s hospital were also uncovered and an iron-smelting shaft furnace, a first for Roman Scotland. Fragments of samian ware and amphorae were recovered dating to the Flavian period and the first Roman incursion into Scotland (from 79 AD to the mid-80s AD). The remains of the Roman fort are a scheduled monument.

== Folklore ==
As in other Celtic lands, Doune has tales of fairies. One place associated with such folklore is Ternishee, a small wood east of the Annat chapel, above Doune Lodge, 1 1/2 miles (2.5 kilometres) from Doune. Its name comes from the Scottish Gaelic: tìr na sìdhe, lit. 'land of the fairies'. Fairy dancing parties are recounted on the Fairy Knowe, a hillock on the right bank of the Ardoch, 1/2 mile (800 metres) east of Doune. Near the Bridge of Teith, on the low road to Callander, a burial mound called Tullochanknowe is said to be a favourite haunt of the fairies.

== Other information ==
Doune Speed Hillclimb is the most prestigious hillclimb motorsport course in Scotland, and hosts a round of the British Hill Climb Championship each year.

The town used to be served by Doune railway station.

Doune has often been used as a filming location, most famously for Monty Python and the Holy Grail which was filmed at Doune Castle. The castle has also been used for major TV series, most notably Ivanhoe, Game of Thrones and Outlander.
