= Benvane =

Mountain in Stirling, Scotland

Coordinates: 56.293295°N 4.368435°W

- Scottish Gaelic: Beinn Bhàn
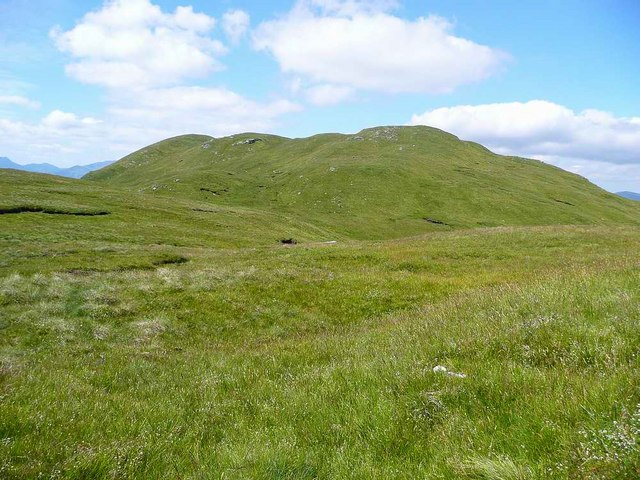
- Benvane from its south ridge

Highest point
- Elevation: 821 m (2,694 ft)
- Prominence: 215 metres (705 ft)
- Parent peak: Ben Ledi
- Listing: Corbett, Marilyn

Naming
- English translation: White Mountain
- Language of name: Gaelic

Geography
- Location: Stirling, Scotland
- Parent range: Trossachs
- OS grid: NN535137
- Topo map: OS Landranger 57

Benvane (Scottish Gaelic: Beinn Bhàn) is a mountain in the Trossachs, in Stirling council area, Scotland. It lies within Loch Lomond and The Trossachs National Park and the Queen Elizabeth Forest Park, and the summit is on the western boundary of the Trossachs National Nature Reserve. It is 821 metres (2,694 ft) high, and is classified as a Corbett, being joined by a ridge to the neighbouring Corbett of Ben Ledi.

Benvane may be climbed by several routes, which can be combined to make for a circular route. From the south the summit can be reached via the 6 km-long ridge that connects it to Ben Ledi: the bealach between the two peaks can be reached via Ben Ledi itself or directly: either from the Stank Glen on the west side of this ridge, ascending from the shores of Loch Lubaig; or from Brig o' Turk via the Glen Finglas reservoir and Glen Casaig. Brig o' Turk also serves as the start point for a route ascending directly to Benvane's summit via its south ridge. On the northern side of the hill there are also routes from Strathyre, and from Glen Buckie near Balquhidder via a route up the hill's north ridge.

The Ben Ledi-Benvane ridge marks the boundary between West Strathyre estate (owned by Forestry and Land Scotland), and Glen Finglas Estate, which is owned by the Woodland Trust.
