= Bracklinn Falls =

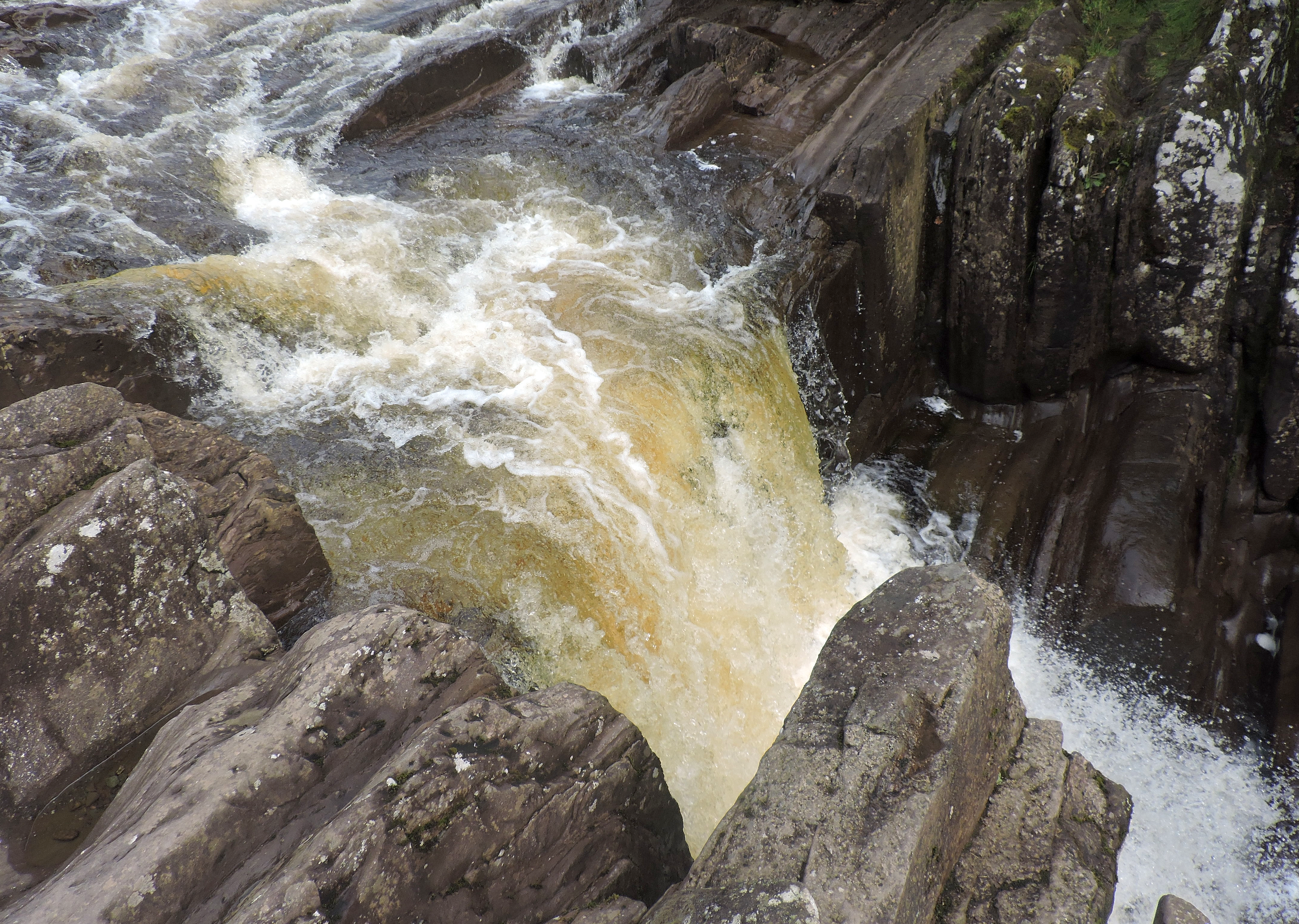
- The highest drop from above

- Location within Scotland
- Location: Callander, Stirling, Scotland
- Coordinates: 56.24963°N 4.18844°W
- Watercourse: Keltie Water

The Bracklinn Falls are a series of waterfalls north-east of Callander, Scotland on the course of the Keltie Water, where the river crosses the Highland Boundary Fault.

Over recent years there have been a number of tragic incidents at the falls.

== Toponymy ==
The name of the falls should mean speckled or white foaming pool.

== The Bridge ==
In 2004, a long-standing steel footbridge over the falls was washed away by severe floods. In October 2010, a new, 20-tonne wood-and-copper footbridge, spanning 20m across a very deep gorge, was hauled into place by hand because the location made it impossible to use a crane. In July 2011, this new bridge won an award at the International Footbridge Awards. In the winter of 2020, "some areas of deterioration requiring further examination" were noted on the bridge, and it was closed for several months. The wooden, award-winning bridge was deemed unsafe and a replacement metal bridge was commissioned, expected to open in 2022 and finally opening to the public in March 2023.

== Access to the falls ==
The falls can be reached with an easy walk from a car-park close to Callander; the itinerary is signposted and takes a couple of hours there and back.

== Nature conservation ==
The waterfall and its surrounding area belongs to the Loch Lomond and The Trossachs National Park.

== Photo gallery ==
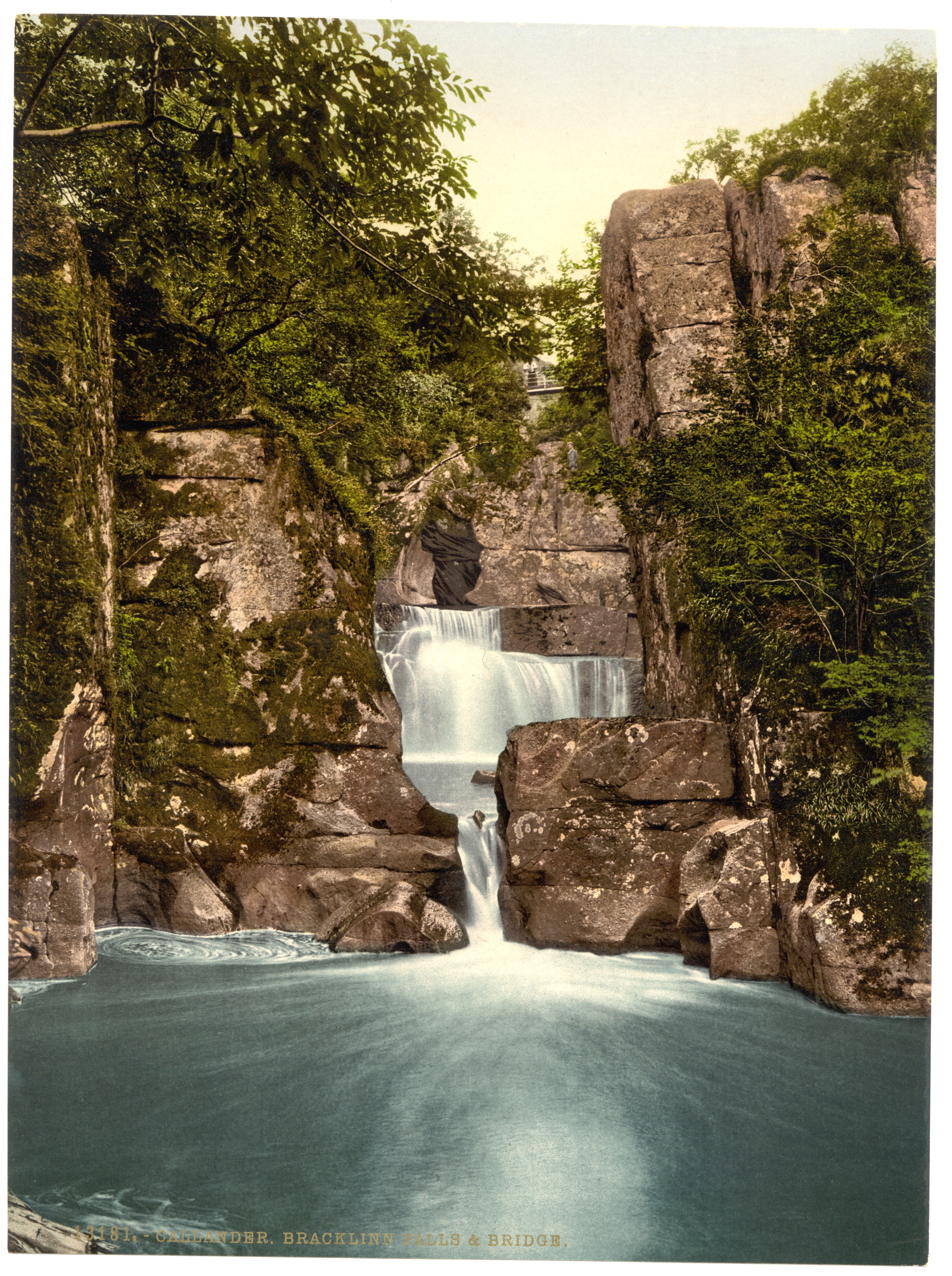
Falls and bridge in 1890s

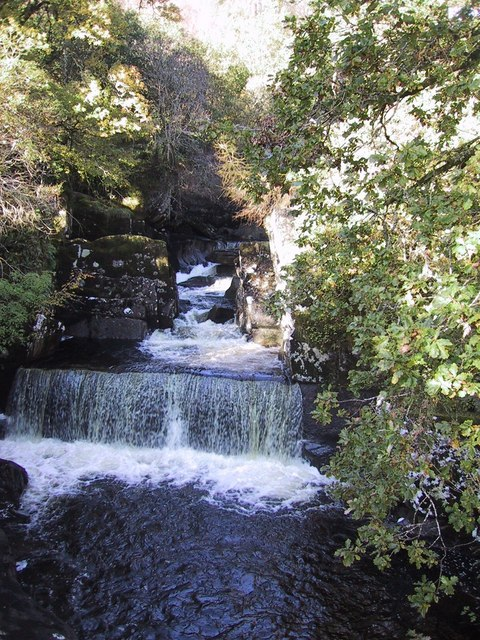
Falls in 2002

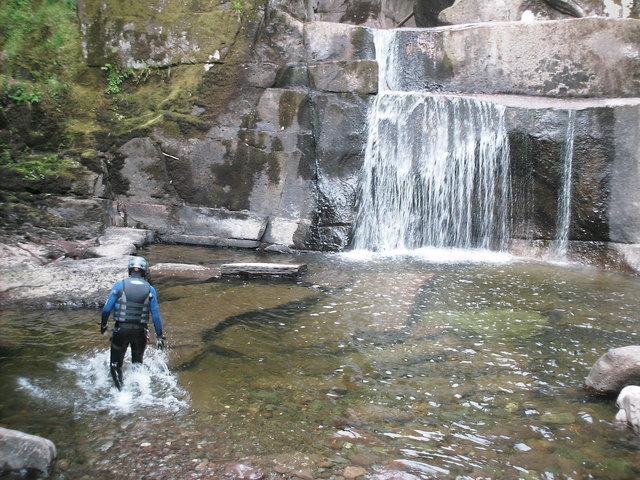
Falls with human for scale

== See also ==
- Waterfalls of Scotland

Media related to Bracklinn Falls, Callander at Wikimedia Commons
