= Kilmahog =

Coordinates: 56.248°N 4.245°W

Kilmahog: Scottish Gaelic: Cille MoChùig
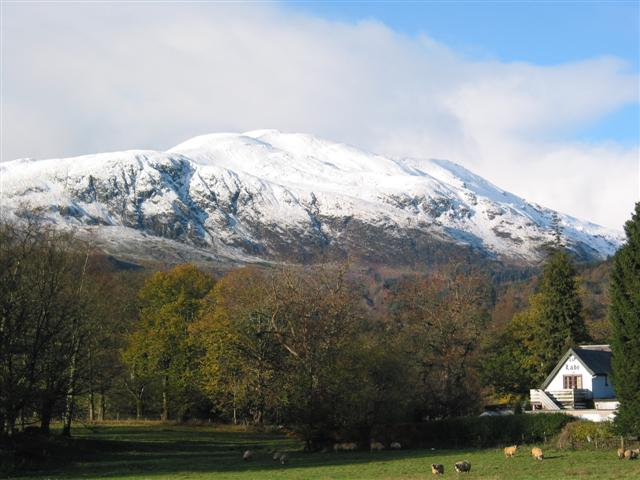
- Ben Ledi viewed from Kilmahog

- Location within the Stirling council area
- OS grid reference: NN609084
- Civil parish: Callander
- Council area: Stirling
- Lieutenancy area: Stirling and Falkirk
- Country: Scotland
- Sovereign state: United Kingdom
- Post town: CALLANDER
- Postcode district: FK17
- Dialling code: 01877
- Police: Scotland
- Fire: Scottish
- Ambulance: Scottish
- UK Parliament: Stirling and Strathallan
- Scottish Parliament: Stirling

Kilmahog (Scottish Gaelic: Cille MoChùig: Cell of St. Chug) is a hamlet situated half a mile to the west of Callander, Scotland.

== Toponym ==
Kilmahog is supposedly derived from the Scottish Gaelic, Cille MoChùig, meaning cell of Chug (a church dedicated to Saint Chug). Although a medieval chapel was located at Kilmahog, the identity of Chug is not authentically known. Place name scholars have proposed that this could be Saint Cuaca from Meath in Ireland. Alternative evidence suggests that this Saint is the sixth century Saint Machutus (who may have originally been named Mahagw).

== Geography ==
Kilmahog lies on the Garbh Uisge, also known as the "River Leny", at the junction of the Trossachs and Lochearnhead roads. The village today consists of a few houses and two woollen mill retail facilities (the Trossachs Woollen Mill and the Kilmahog Woollen Mill,) with farm land to the north and forestry to the south. One of the woollen mills retains a working loom. There is a local pub, near the site of the old chapel, called The Lade Inn, and the Scottish Real Ale shop, which aims to stock all bottled Scottish ales. The "lade" is a man-made diversion from the river that was used to power the watermills.

Nearby, Samson's Putting Stone sits precariously on Bochastle hill. Local legend has it that the stone came to be there as a result of a putting competition between a family of giants. The winner of the competition was Samson who lived on Ben Ledi (other versions of the legend mention Ben Lawers). A modern interpretation is that the stone is a glacial erratic carried from the Glen Dochart region and left there when the ice retreated at the end of the last ice age.

== History ==
South of Kilmahog the remains of an ancient hillfort can be seen at Dunmore overlooking Loch Venachar. The fort is semi-oval in shape and occupies a defensive position on a low hill. It was likely a large defended structure visible from some distance. Excavations have revealed a well in the inner area and signs of vitrified stonework. Although the fort remains undated it was likely to have been founded no later than the Iron Age and may have been in use until the Middle Ages. Today only the remains of the ramparts are visible.

Nearby, the remains of first century Roman ramparts attributed to the campaigns of Agricola can be seen at Bochastle in the fields to the east of the former railway. The fortification was constructed during the Flavian occupation in Scotland around 80 CE and it may have served as a northern fort of the Gask Ridge frontier. It was situated to overlook the approach to Loch Katrine and the Pass of Leny. The fort was likely in use for a few years at most and only the earthworks are visible today.

Kilmahog used to be the site of St. Chug's chapel, after which it is named. Ecclesiastical letters record a chapel at Kilmahog in 1239 as a mensal church of the Bishop of Dunblane. All that remains of the chapel is a small burial ground with stones dating back to the late 17th century. Kilmahog was the site of an early 19th-century toll house and later a tweed mill.

The former Callander and Oban Railway line passed through Kilmahog; the trackbed is now part of the National Cycle Network (route 7) and the Rob Roy Way. The village sits at the Northern point of a loop known as the Trossachs Bird of Prey Trail.

== Use in fiction ==
- Kilmahog was used as the inspiration for the main setting in the novel "Under the Mountain" by Sophie Cooke.
