= Ardoch Burn =

Stream in Scotland

Ardoch: Scottish Gaelic: Àrdach
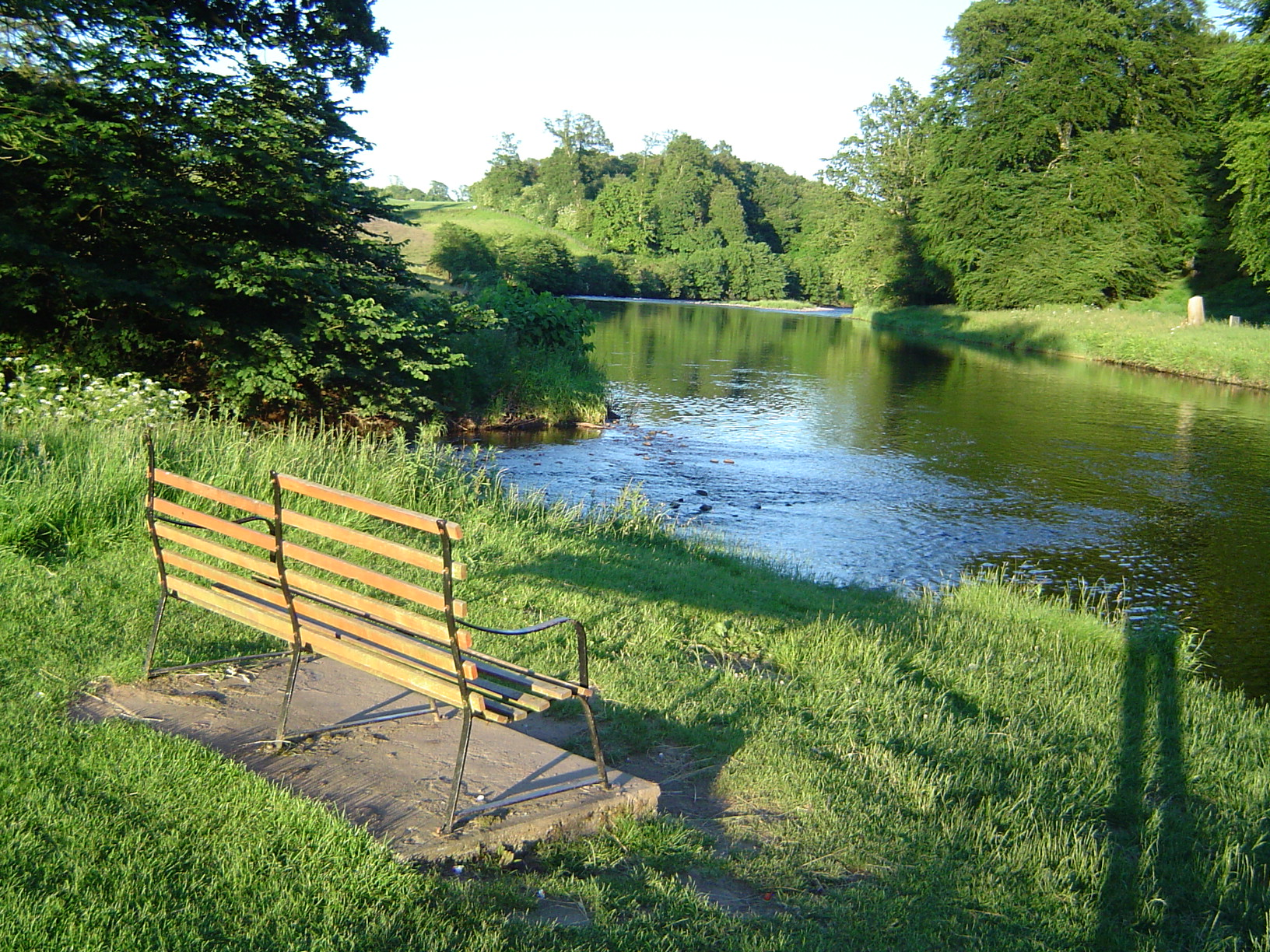
- Country: Scotland
- Sovereign state: United Kingdom
- Police: Scotland
- Fire: Scottish
- Ambulance: Scottish

The Ardoch Burn is a stream in Stirling council area, Scotland, which flows from the Braes Of Doune into the River Teith at Inverardoch, just behind Doune Castle.

== Etymology ==
From the Scottish Gaelic ard, which translates into English as "high," with the -ach suffix, which could mean "place" or "field." In Perthshire and Stirlingshire Gaelic the ends of words were dropped. Achadh, the Gaelic for field, often becomes ach.

== Course ==
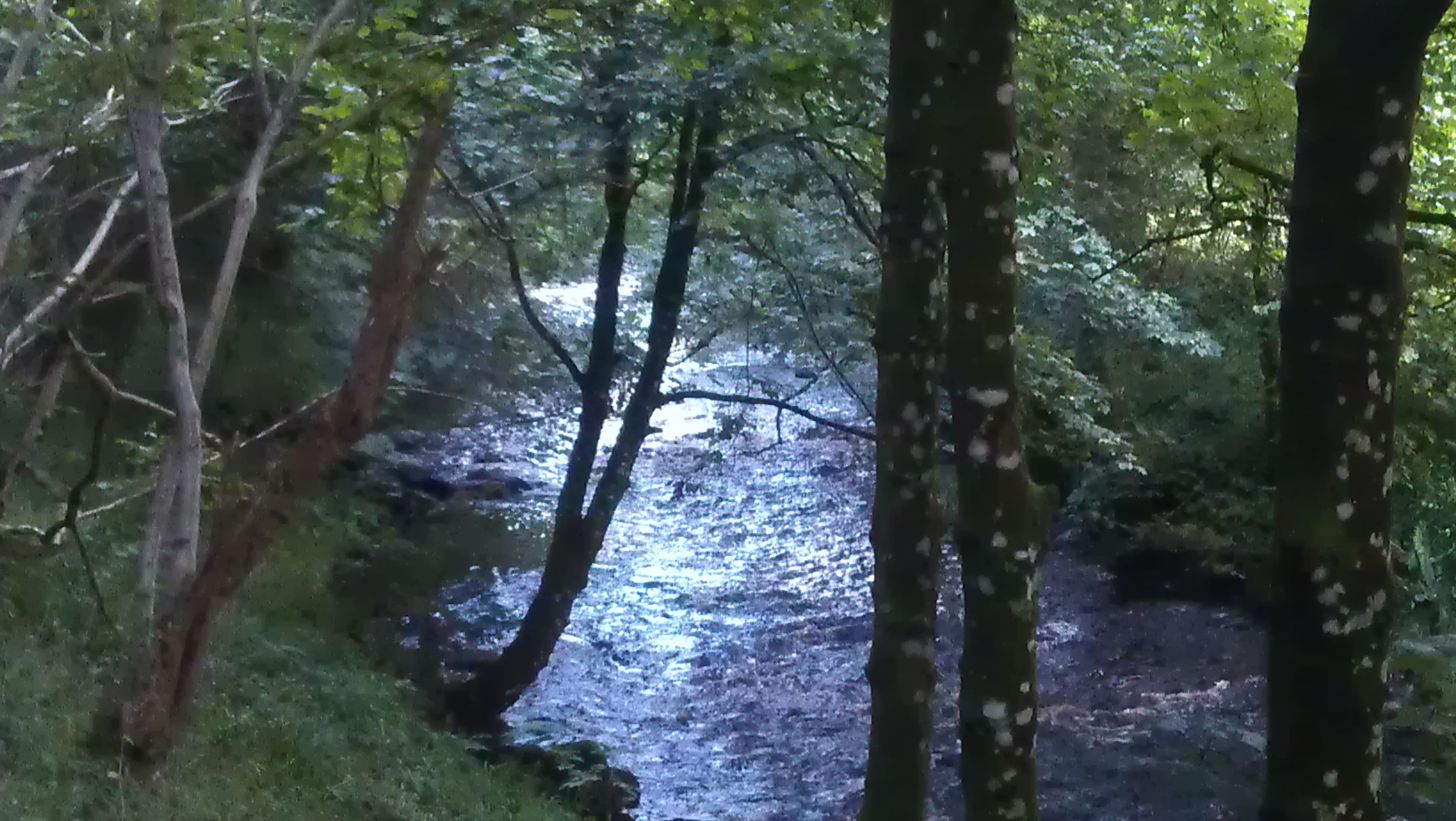
Ardoch Burn near Argaty

The Ardoch Burn begins at Loch Mahaick in the high braes (56.2361°N 4.0842°W), eventually reaching the end of its journey where it meets the River Teith at Inverardoch (56.1815°N 4.0471°W). It has several tributaries along its course as it drains the south western slopes of Uamh Mhor before passing Kilbride Castle and west to Doune where it meets the River Teith. The stream's course flows broadly southwards and is approximately 7 miles in length from source to its convergence with the River Teith.
