= Eas Gobhain =

Location
- Country: Scotland

Physical characteristics
- Source: Loch Venachar
  - location: 56.23002°N 4.26271°W
- Mouth: River Teith
  - location: Callander
  - coordinates: 56.24132°N 4.22443°W

Eas Gobhain is a river in the Trossachs of Scotland just west of Callander . It is the outflow of Loch Venachar and joins with Garbh Uisge west of Callander to form the River Teith. The name of the river, Eas Gobhain, translates from Gaelic as "the smith's cascade".
