= River Teith =

River in Scotland

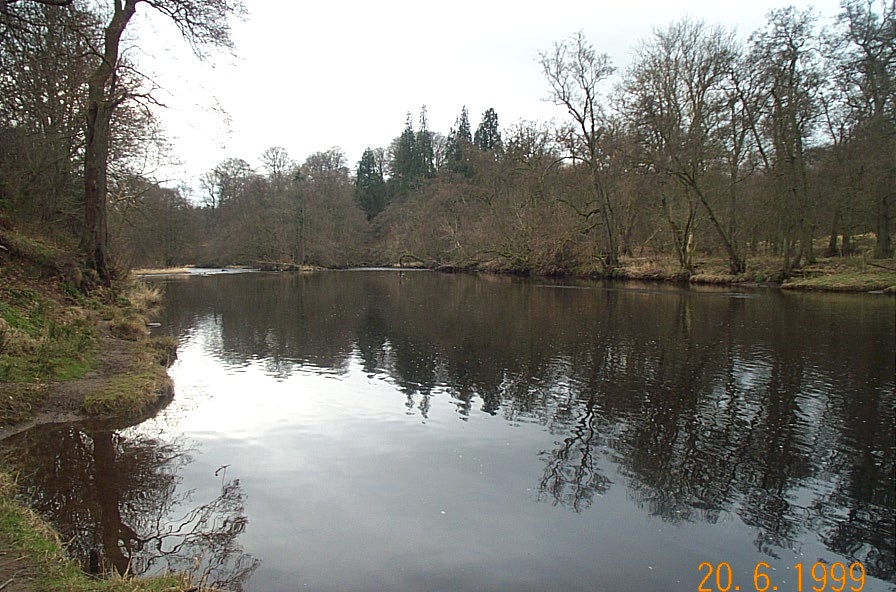
- Castle Pool, 2 km downstream from Doune
- Native name: Uisge Thèadhaich

Location
- Country: Scotland

Physical characteristics
- Source
  - location: Callander
  - coordinates: 56.24132°N 4.22443°W
- Mouth: River Forth
  - coordinates: 56.14230°N 3.98155°W
- Length: 113 km (70 mi)
- Discharge
  - location: River Forth

The River Teith (Scottish Gaelic: Uisge Thèadhaich)is a river in Scotland, which is formed from the confluence of two smaller rivers, the Garbh Uisge (River Leny) and Eas Gobhain at Callander, Stirlingshire. It flows into the River Forth near Drip north-west of Stirling.

== Etymology ==
The name Teith is obscure, but the Gaelic name has been translated into English as the "quiet and pleasant water".

The place-name Callander may conserve an older name for the Teith, derived from Brittonic *caleto-dubro, meaning "hard-water".

== Course ==
The Teith is formed from the confluence of two smaller rivers: one from Loch Venachar, the Eas Gobhain which translates as "the smith's cascade", and one from Loch Lubnaig - Garbh Uisge which translates as "the rough water". The river flows through Callander and is joined by the Keltie Water one mile (1.5 kilometres) south of Keltie Bridge. The Teith continues to Deanston and Doune where the Ardoch Burn meets it, before its confluence with the (smaller) Forth upstream of Stirling.

== Importance ==
The Teith is renowned for its fishing and for the splendid arched bridge 1/2 mile (800 metres) southwest of Doune.

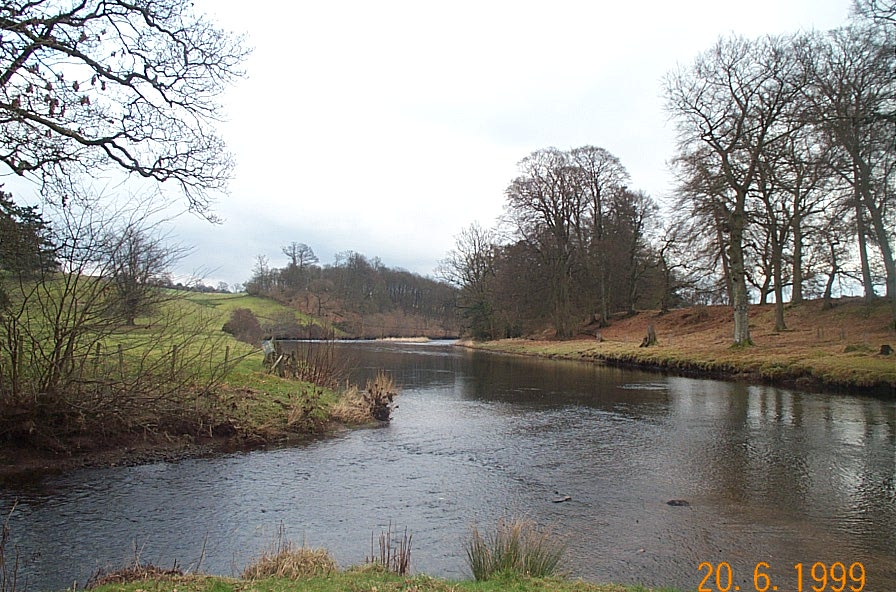
Confluence of Ardoch with Teith, 3 km downstream from Doune

The Deanston Distillery near Doune uses the Teith to supply water for the manufacture of Deanston Single Malt Whisky.

The 'Brig o' Teith' was constructed in 1535 by Robert Spittal, a Royal tailor to Margaret Tudor, wife of James IV. According to Charles Rogers in A Week at Bridge of Allan (1851), a ferryman refused Spittal passage across the Teith as he did not have his purse and could not pay. The bridge was built in retaliation.
