= Garbh Uisge =

River in Scotland

Garbh Uisge River Leny
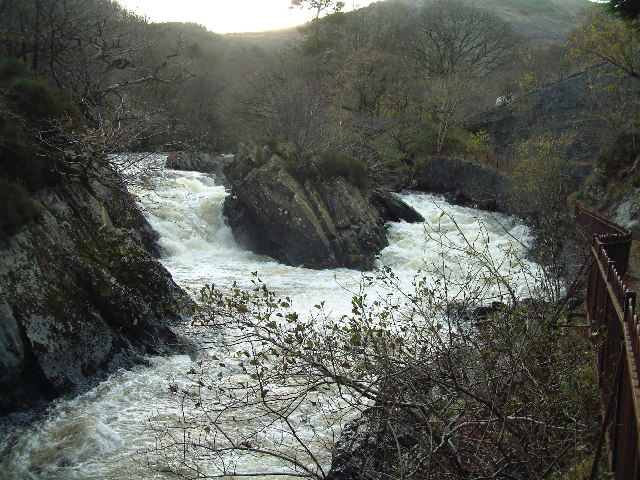
- The Falls of Leny, upstream from Kilmahog

Location
- Country: United Kingdom
- Constituent country: Scotland

Physical characteristics
- Source
  - location: Loch Lubnaig
- Mouth: River Teith
  - location: Callander
  - coordinates: 56.24132°N 4.22443°W
- Discharge
  - location: River Teith

Garbh Uisge is a river of approximately 7 km in the Trossachs of Scotland just north-west Callander. It is the outflow of Loch Lubnaig and joins with Eas Gobhain west of Callander to form the River Teith. The name of the river, Garbh Uisge, is Gaelic for "Rough Water". The river is often informally called the River Leny due to the Falls of Leny, where the river crosses the Highland Boundary Fault, and because it flows through the Pass of Leny.
