= George Houston (painter) =

Scottish artist (1869–1947)

George Houston RSA, RI, RSW (20 January 1869 – 5 October 1947) was a Scottish artist. He was a prolific landscape painter, using both oil and watercolour. He primarily depicted scenes of Argyll and Ayrshire.

== Life and death ==
Houston was born in Dalry, North Ayrshire. In the 1880s he stayed at North Bank Cottage in Portencross, where he formed a long-lasting friendship with the noted Scottish author Neil Munro. In 1912 Neil Munro wrote a book entitled "Ayrshire Idylls", and this was illustrated by George Houston. It is possible that Houston and his family moved to the nearby town of Saltcoats before moving back to Dalry. Thereafter he lived at West Lynn until his death on 5 October 1947.

In his works, Houston took inspiration from the landscapes of Ayrshire and the Mull of Kintyre.

== Notable works ==
An Ayrshire Landscape was purchased by Glasgow Corporation in 1904 and remains in the Glasgow Museums collection. Houston was a friend of the writer Neil Munro and illustrated Munro's book Ayrshire Idylls (A&C Black, 1912). Munro also provided commentary on Burns' Country, a series of 12 etchings made by Houston published in 1915. These etchings are now in the possession of the North Ayrshire Council Museums Service.

== Family ==
Houston married Anne Kerr Crawford in 1889 and the couple had ten children together.
