= Ben Ledi =

Mountain in Stirling, Scotland

Coordinates: 56.25886°N 4.32298°W

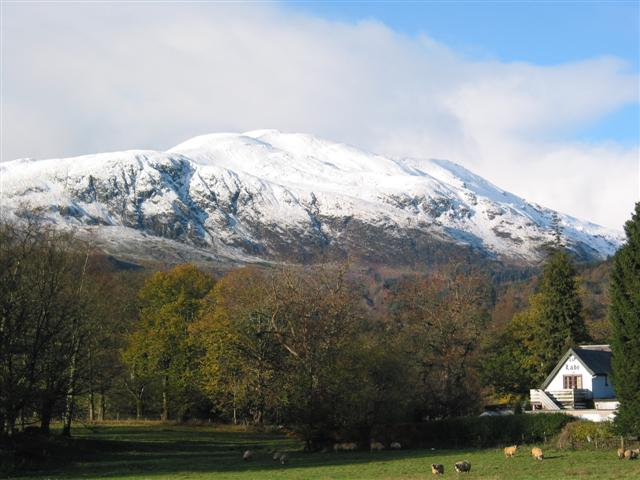
- Ben Ledi seen from Kilmahog

Highest point
- Elevation: 878.6 m (2,883 ft)
- Prominence: c. 528 m
- Parent peak: None
- Listing: Corbett, Marilyn

Naming
- Native name: Beinn Leitir (Scottish Gaelic)
- English translation: Hill of the long shoulder
- Pronunciation: Scottish Gaelic: [peɲ ˈʎehtʲɪrʲ]

Geography
- Location: Stirling, Scotland
- Parent range: Trossachs
- OS grid: NN562098
- Topo map: OS Landranger 57

Ben Ledi (Beinn Leitir in Scottish Gaelic) is a mountain in Stirling, Scotland. It is 878.6 metres (2,883 feet) high, and is therefore classified as a Corbett. It lies about six kilometres (four miles) northwest of Callander, near the village of Kilmahog. It is situated in the Trossachs, an area often regarded as having some of the most romantic scenery in the Highlands.

== History ==
Ben Ledi is particularly well known through Walter Scott's poem Lady of the Lake. Supposedly in ancient times, Beltane rites were observed on the summit. There are what is thought to be possible references to these Beltane rights in some of the Gaelic names on the mountain: Creag Ghorn; "Rock of Embers" and Creag Loisgte; "Burned Rock". In 1791 the Rev Doctor James Robertson, being minister of the parish at the time, was required to write a description of the parish for the First Statistical Account of Scotland. In his report he mistakenly (due to the similarity to le dia) took the name Ben Ledi to mean "hill of god" which suited the purposes of the kirk of the day. The name is in fact a corruption of Beinn Leitir which translates to "the Hill of the Slope", which is a very suitable description of the long south shoulder used to access the summit. A cairn was built on the top in 1887 to commemorate Queen Victoria's jubilee.

A small lochan, Lochan nan Corp, lies at 655 m above sea level about 1.5 km to the north of the summit. The name means "the little loch of the dead", and was thought to be named for an accident to a funeral party at which 200 lives were lost. In truth the lochan is on the old coffin road from Glen Finlas to St Bride's chapel close to Loch Lubnaig. The pass is therefore named Bealach nan Corp – the Pass of the Dead – and the lochan is named after the pass.

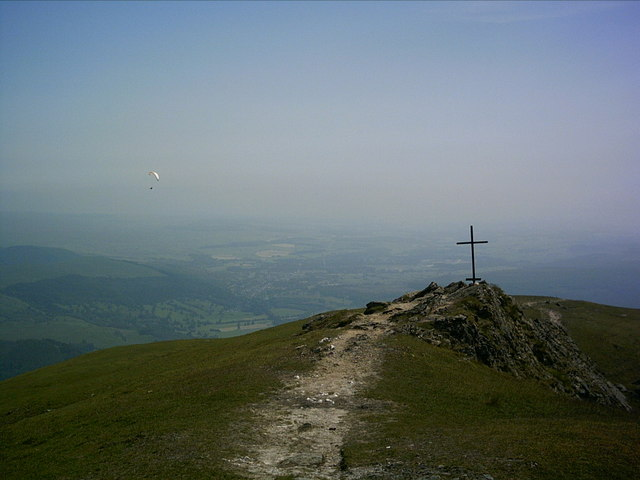
View from the summit towards Callander past the iron cross commemorating Sgt. Harry Lawrie of Killin Mountain Rescue

== Access routes ==
The eastern slopes of Ben Ledi are owned by Forestry and Land Scotland, and form part of the Queen Elizabeth Forest Park. A constructed path leads from a car park on the A84 road just south of Loch Lubnaig to a fence at about 270 m above sea level, where a rough track continues to the summit via the south shoulder, a distance of just over 3 km. An alternative route following Stank Glen leaves the shores of Loch Lubnaig about 1.5 km north of the start of the main route, reaching the summit ridge near Lochan nan Corp. The two routes may be combined to give a circular walk of about 9 km.

A short distance down to the south-east of the summit trig point, an iron cross commemorates Sergeant Harry Lawrie of the Killin Scottish Mountain Rescue team, who died on 1 February 1987 during a rescue operation on Ben More near Crianlarich when the helicopter crashed.

In addition to hiking the Ben is occasionally used as a take-off point for paragliding.

The Ben Ledi ridge continues north, dropping down to about 600 m before climbing again to the summit of Benvane, a Corbett not to be confused with Ben Vane, a Munro on the west side of Loch Lomond.
