= Callander =

Town in Stirling, Scotland

Coordinates: 56.24403°N 4.21446°W

Callander: Scottish Gaelic: Calasraid
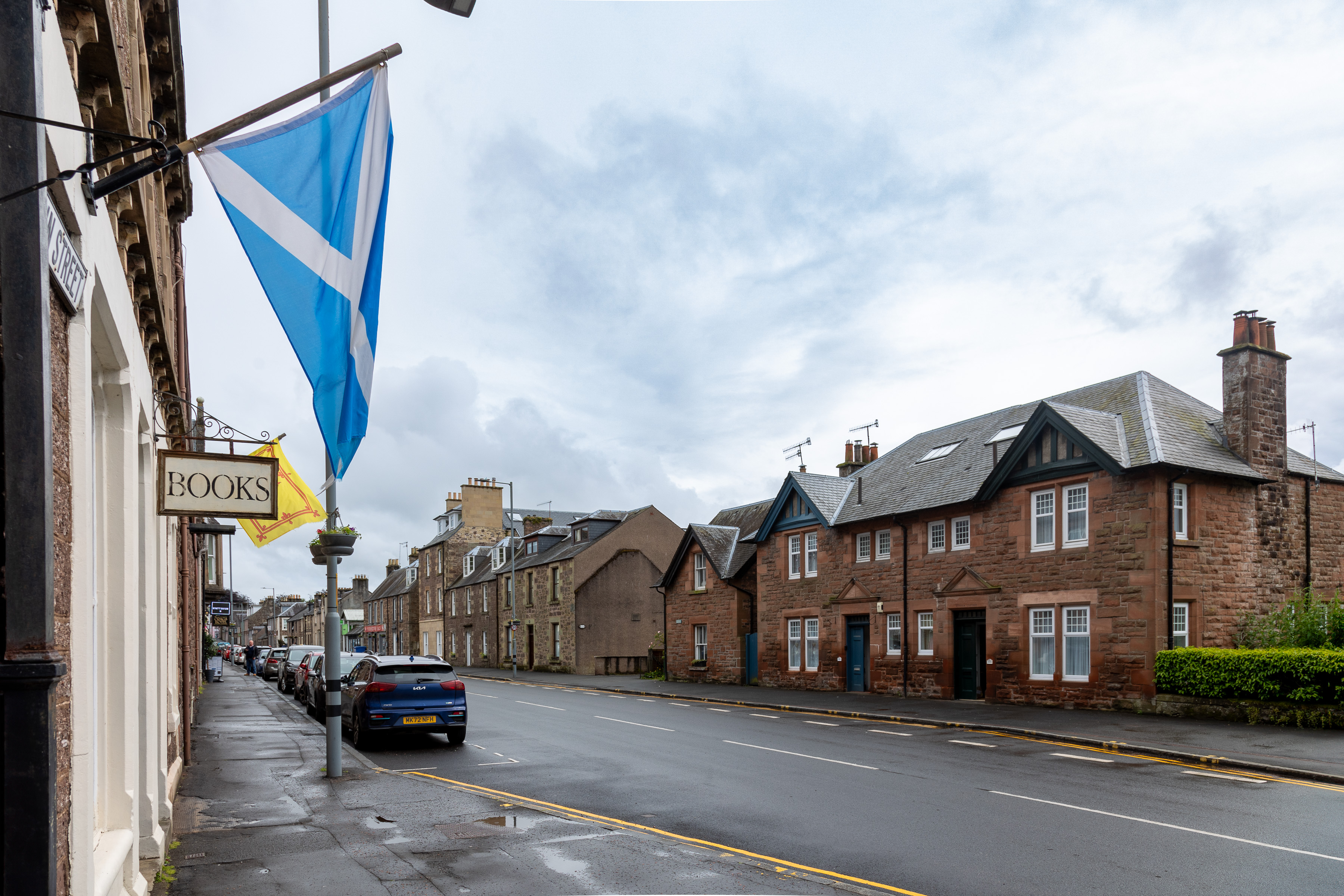

- Location within the Stirling council area
- Population: 3,080 (2020)
- OS grid reference: NN628079
  - Edinburgh: 44 mi (71 km)
  - London: 367 mi (591 km)
- Council area: Stirling
- Country: Scotland
- Sovereign state: United Kingdom
- Post town: CALLANDER
- Postcode district: FK17
- Dialling code: 01877
- Police: Scotland
- Fire: Scottish
- Ambulance: Scottish
- UK Parliament: Stirling and Strathallan
- Scottish Parliament: Stirling

Callander (/ˈkæləndər/; Scottish Gaelic: Calasraid) is a small town in the council area of Stirling in Scotland, situated on the River Teith. The town is located in the historic county of Perthshire and is a popular tourist stop to and from the Highlands.

== Description ==
The town serves as the eastern gateway to the Loch Lomond and the Trossachs National Park, the first National Park in Scotland, and is often referred to as the "Gateway to the Highlands".

Dominating the town to the north are the Callander Crags, a visible part of the Highland Boundary Fault, rising to 343 metres (1,125 ft) at the cairn. Ben Ledi (879 metres, 2,884 ft) lies north-west of Callander. Popular local walks include Bracklinn Falls, The Meadows, Callander Crags and the Wood Walks. The Rob Roy Way passes through Callander. The town sits on the Trossachs Bird of Prey Trail. The River Teith is formed from the confluence of two smaller rivers, the Garbh Uisge (River Leny) and Eas Gobhain about 1/3 mile (500 m) west of the bridge at Callander.

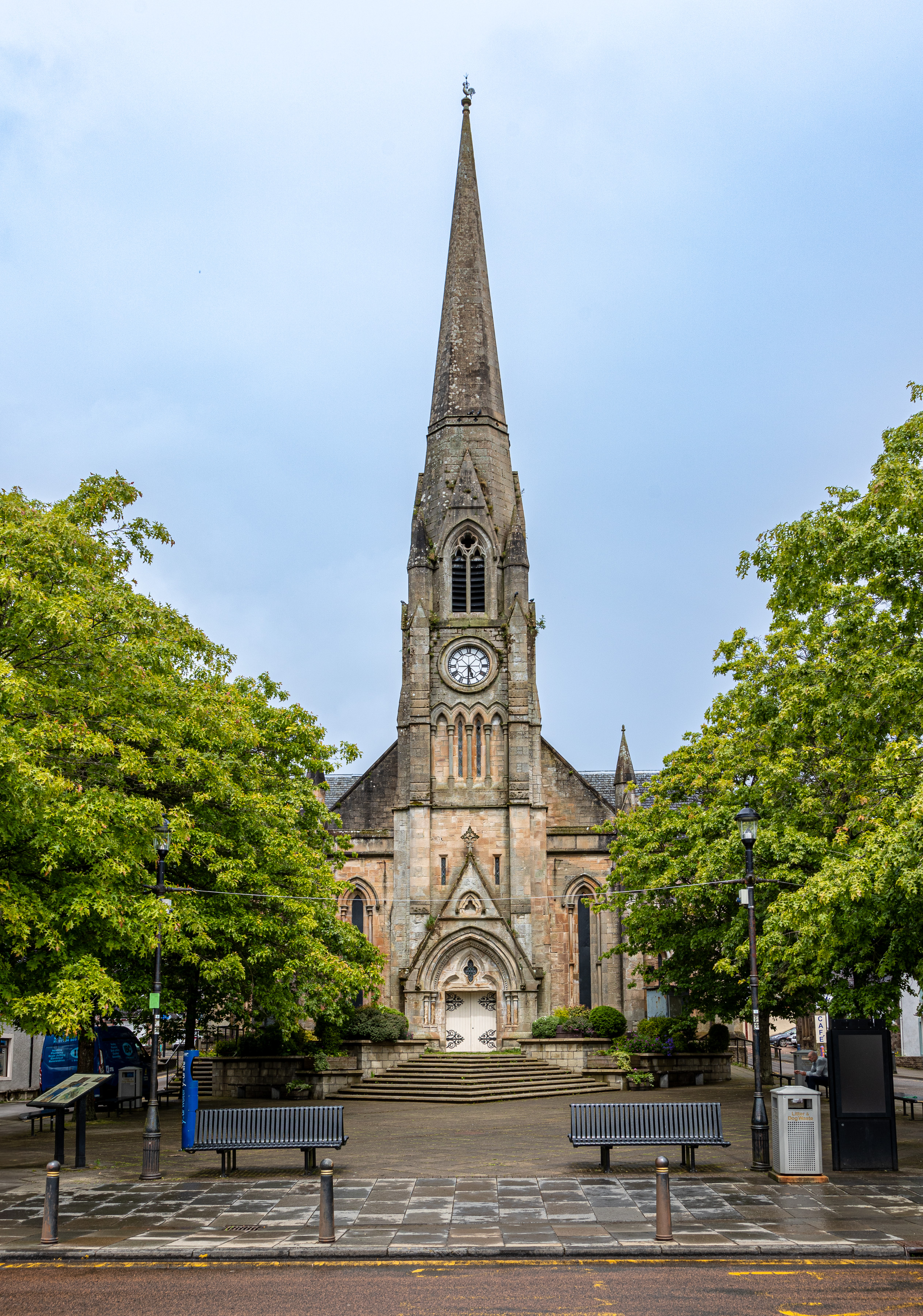
St. Kessog's Church

A 19th-century Gothic church stands in the town square, named after Saint Kessog, an Irish missionary who is said to have preached in the area in the sixth century. The church closed in 1985 and between 1990 and 2006 the building, after undergoing substantial interior alterations, was home to a visitor centre and audio-visual attraction telling the story of local outlaw, Rob Roy MacGregor. The church building was occupied by The Clanranald Trust for Scotland between 2015 and 2018, but it now lies empty.

Founded in 1892, McLaren High School educates pupils aged 11 to 18 from a wide catchment area extending as far as Killin, Tyndrum and Inversnaid.

In 2018 Callander was named Scotland's First Social Enterprise Place, due to the amount of social enterprise activity within the town. This includes Callander Community Hydro Ltd., a community owned renewable energy project which distributes funds to a variety of local projects.

== Toponym ==
The name Callander was first recorded, perhaps erroneously, as Callander in 1238, and Kallandrech in 1438, and the etymology is uncertain. William J Watson had the derivation as Gaelic Calasraid, meaning "harbour-street" or "ferry-street" in 1913. By 1926, Watson stated "Callander on Teith…is a transferred name from Callander near Falkirk", and indeed, it is probable that from at least the 16th century, Callander was influenced by that spelling. Early forms with Calen- may relate to the original name of the estate, which may have straddled the Teith. Calendrate may have been a subdivision of this estate, and the sraid element may relate to a Roman road. Some of the early forms contain –drate, which might be Gaelic drochaid "bridge".

Callander may also be of Brittonic origin, and derived from *caleto-dubro- (Welsh caled-dŵr), meaning "hard-water". The -n- in the name Callander is intrusive. It may originally have been a river-name, perhaps that of the present River Teith. A name of the Calder type, Callander may share an etymology with the Callater Burn in Aberdeenshire, as well as the English names Calder in West Yorkshire, and Kielder in Northumberland.

== History ==
A Neolithic settlement situated south of the river was excavated in 2001 finding evidence of a timber building 25 metres (80 ft) in length along with Neolithic pottery. The Auchenlaich Cairn, a Neolithic chambered cairn which at 322 metres (1,056 ft) in length is the longest in Britain, is situated near Keltie Bridge just east of Callander. The remains of an ancient hillfort can be seen at Dunmore overlooking Loch Venachar, near Kilmahog. This fort was likely a large defended structure visible from some distance and excavations have revealed a well and signs of vitrified stonework. Nearby, the remains of Roman ramparts constructed during the campaigns of Agricola in the first century AD are visible at Bochastle Farm.

Saint Kessog, a disciple of Columba of Iona, preached and taught in this area in the early sixth century. A small mound by the River Teith is named in pseudo-Gaelic as "Tom na Chessaig", meaning "the Hill of Kessog". This man-made mound is circular with a level top approximately 10 metres (30 ft) in diameter. It is reputed to have been constructed as a memorial to the Saint or even to be the remains of Callander's original church (situated close to the old graveyard). The structure has actually been identified as a medieval motte, although no excavation has confirmed this. Historians record that an annual market called "Feill ma Chessaig" (festival of Kessog) was held here until the early 19th century.

A medieval tower house, Callander Castle, once stood south of the river, which is said to have been "a square tower of considerable height". This belonged to the Livingstons of Callendar House near Falkirk. The only remains of the castle are some masonry and a possible datestone inscribed 1596, which is now incorporated within the old St Kessog's Manse on the same site.

In 1645, during the campaigns of Montrose, a battle was fought at Callander between the Campbells of Argyll and the Atholl men. The Campbells were harassing the McGregors and the McNabs for their allegiance to Montrose. While besieging Castle Ample, the news came of the advance of 700 Atholl men under Inchbrakie. A retreat was made southwards, but, as the Campbells were crossing a ford to the east of the village of Callander, they were overtaken and compelled to give battle. Inchbrakie, advancing part of his force to attack the defenders, quietly marched another detachment towards a ford higher up near the present bridge. A crossing was soon effected, and the Campbells, being unexpectedly attacked on the rear, broke and fled, leaving eighty of their men dead on the field.

Although it is not known when the area was first settled, Callander is mentioned in parish records since at least the 15th century. The Medieval Parish of Callander was a patchwork of estates, settlements and farms and some of these survive in the present street names, such as Murdiestoun, Balgibbon and East Mains. The area around Callander was cleared for sheep before 1800 as part of the early phases of the Highland Clearances.

Scottish Gaelic was once widely spoken. In 1803, William Wordsworth and his sister, Dorothy, visited Callander and the Trossachs and recorded everyday encounters with Gaelic language and culture. In the 1840s sermons were delivered in both Gaelic and English, and Gaelic was taught in at least two schools in the area. By the 1880s most locals were speaking a mixture of Gaelic, Scots and English. In the 1900s, Celtic scholar, William J. Watson, documented, "four Gaelic-speaking men born near Callander, two of whom were over 80 and had excellent knowledge of the place-names." However, one 19th century writer (Alexander MacGibbon) took objection to the local dialect, stating, "The true Gaelic is a noble language, worthy of the fire of Ossian, and wonderfully adapted to the genius of a warlike nation; but the contemptible language of the people about Callander, and to the east, is quite incapable of communicating a noble idea."

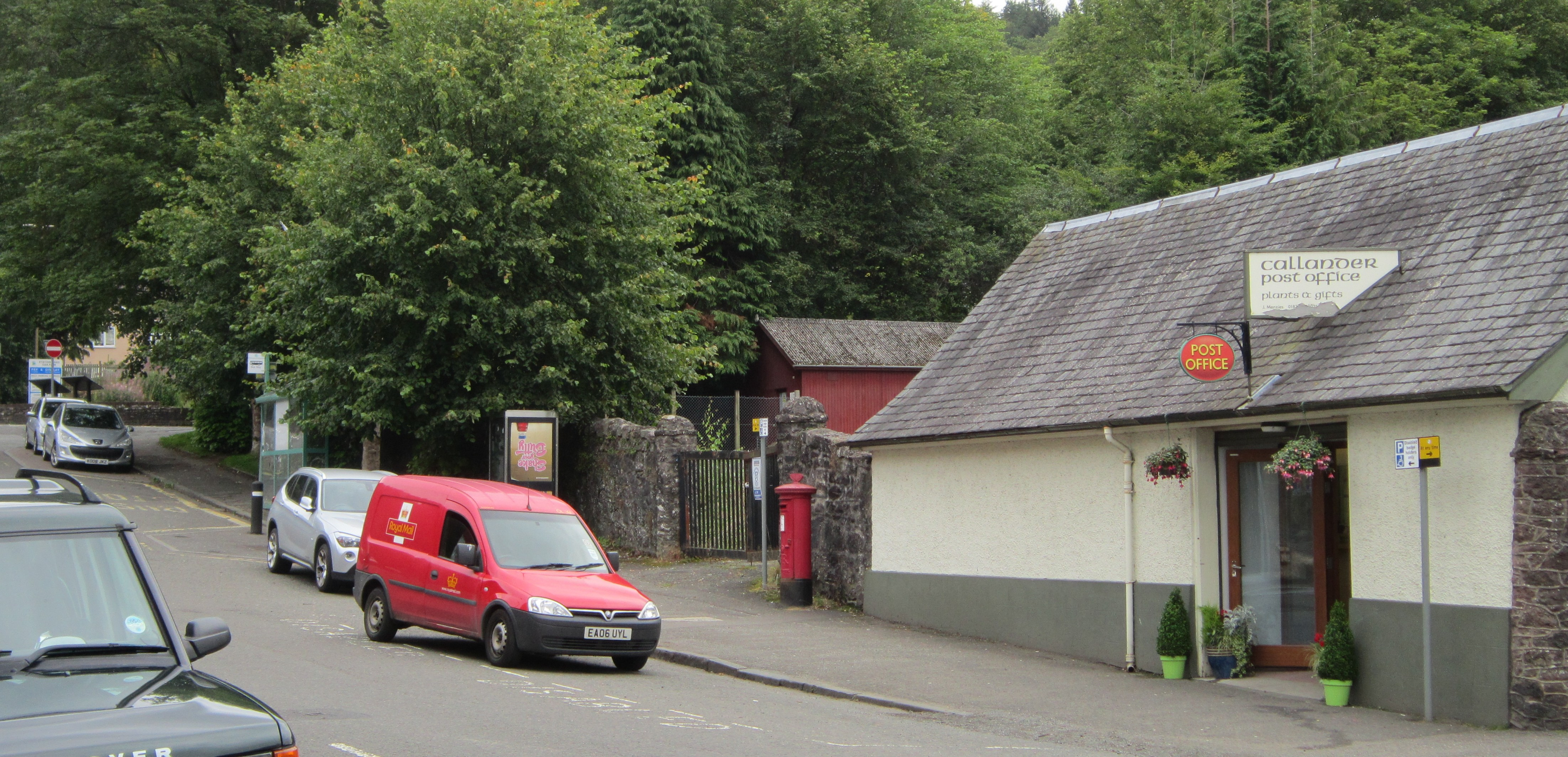
Post Office

Callander was served by rail from 1 July 1858 as the terminus of a branch line from Dunblane. A second Callander railway station was opened about 1/2 mile (800 m) to the west, behind the Dreadnought Hotel, on 1 June 1870 when the railway was extended to Killin en route to Oban, and closed on 5 November 1965. Sections of this former Callander and Oban Railway line, between Callander and Strathyre and between Balquhidder and Killin Junction, are now part of the National Cycle Network (route 7) and the Rob Roy Way. Track from the dismantled Callander and Oban Railway was used in the construction of the transit system for the 1968 Summer Olympics in Mexico City.

The noted Scottish landscape artist Archibald Kay RSW RSA chose Callander as his home from 1904 and he became a noted resident of the town. A member of the Glasgow Art Club, The Paisley Art Institute and a close associate of fellow artist George Houston, Kay painted all around the River Leny and the hills of the Trossachs National Park and Kay is noted especially for his views of Ben Ledi overlooking Callander. Elected a member of the Scottish Royal Society of Arts, Kay was elected a member of the school board for McLaren High School in 1911 and was commissioned by Callander town council to design the war memorial to honour the fallen from the town and this was erected in Ancaster Square. Kay died in 1935 and is buried in Callander alongside his twelve-year-old son Archie, who drowned in a boating accident in 1907, and Archibald Kay's cousin George Whitelaw who also drowned trying to save him. Kay's second wife Mary also rests in the impressive Georgian style monument in the Stirling Road Cemetery.

== Notable residents ==
- Reverend Andrew Nisbet Bogle (1868-1957) Moderator of the General Assembly of the Church of Scotland in 1930.
- John Michael Baillie-Hamilton Buchanan, the current Chief of Clan Buchanan and the first Chief in over 330 years.
- Francis Buchanan-Hamilton (1762–1829), physician and biologist, was born in Callander
- Helen Duncan, from Callander, was the second to last person to be tried and imprisoned for the crime of Witchcraft in the UK, during World War Two.
- Saul Davies, James' guitarist, moved to Callander with his young family in 2013.
- Archibald Kay (1860-1935), landscape artist, lived in Callander

== Callander in popular culture ==
Callander achieved prominence during the 1960s as the fictional setting "Tannochbrae" in the BBC television series Dr. Finlay's Casebook.

In the fictional setting of the G.I. Joe: A Real American Hero franchise, the villainous character Destro, portrayed by Christopher Eccleston in the 2009 live-action film G.I. Joe: The Rise of Cobra, was born in Callander.

The fictional teenager, Adrian Mole, while on holiday at Loch Lubnaig walks to Callander to buy a Mars bar and play Space Invaders (The Secret Diary of Adrian Mole, Aged 13¾ by Sue Townsend).

== Annual events ==
- Official Opening of Salmon fishing on the River Teith, Callander (February)
- Callander Summerfest (July)
- Callander Highland Games (July)
- Trossachs Beer Festival (August/September)
- Callander Jazz & Blues Festival (September/October)
- Callander Winterfest (December)

== Postcard gallery ==
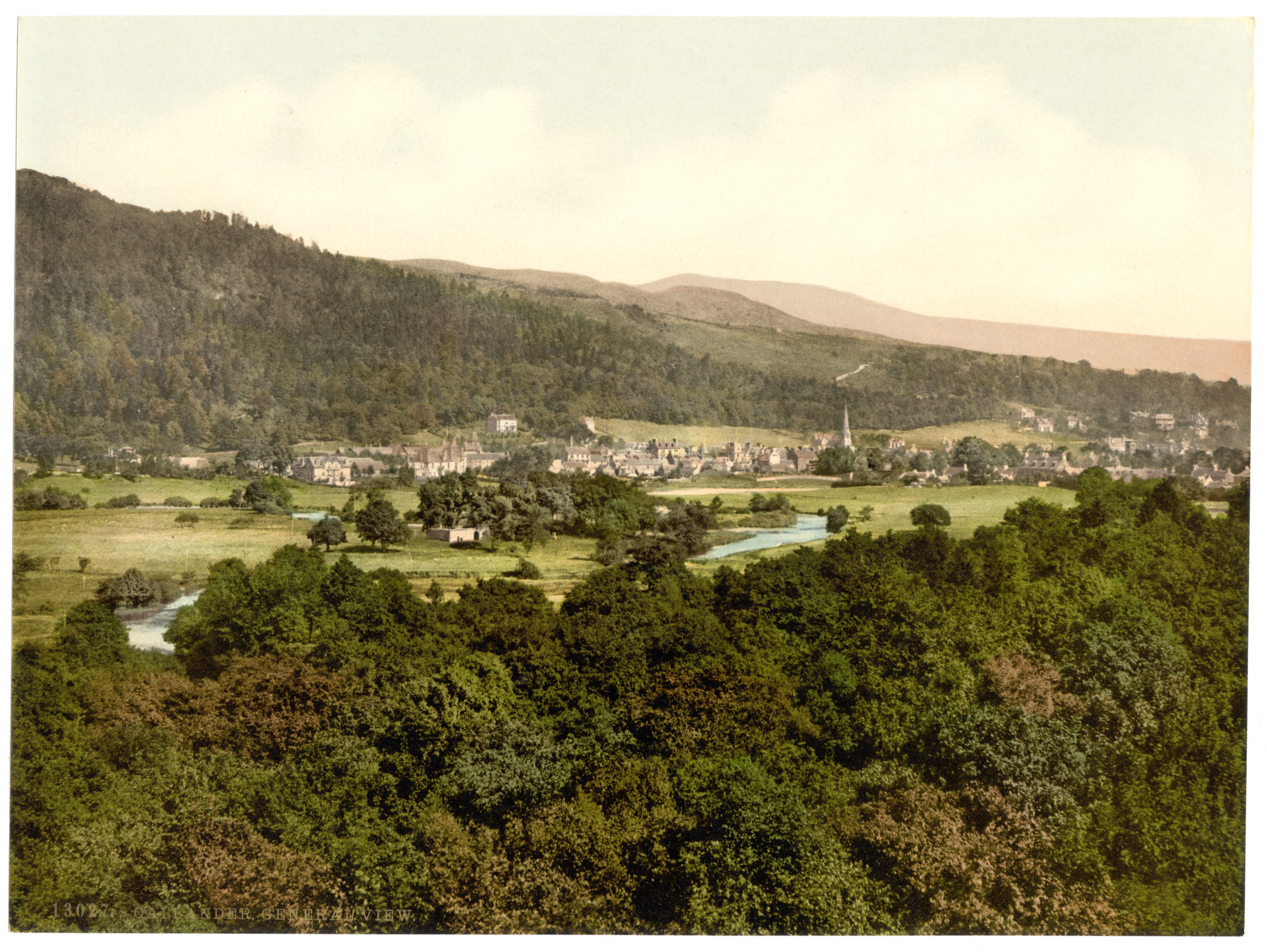
General view Callander

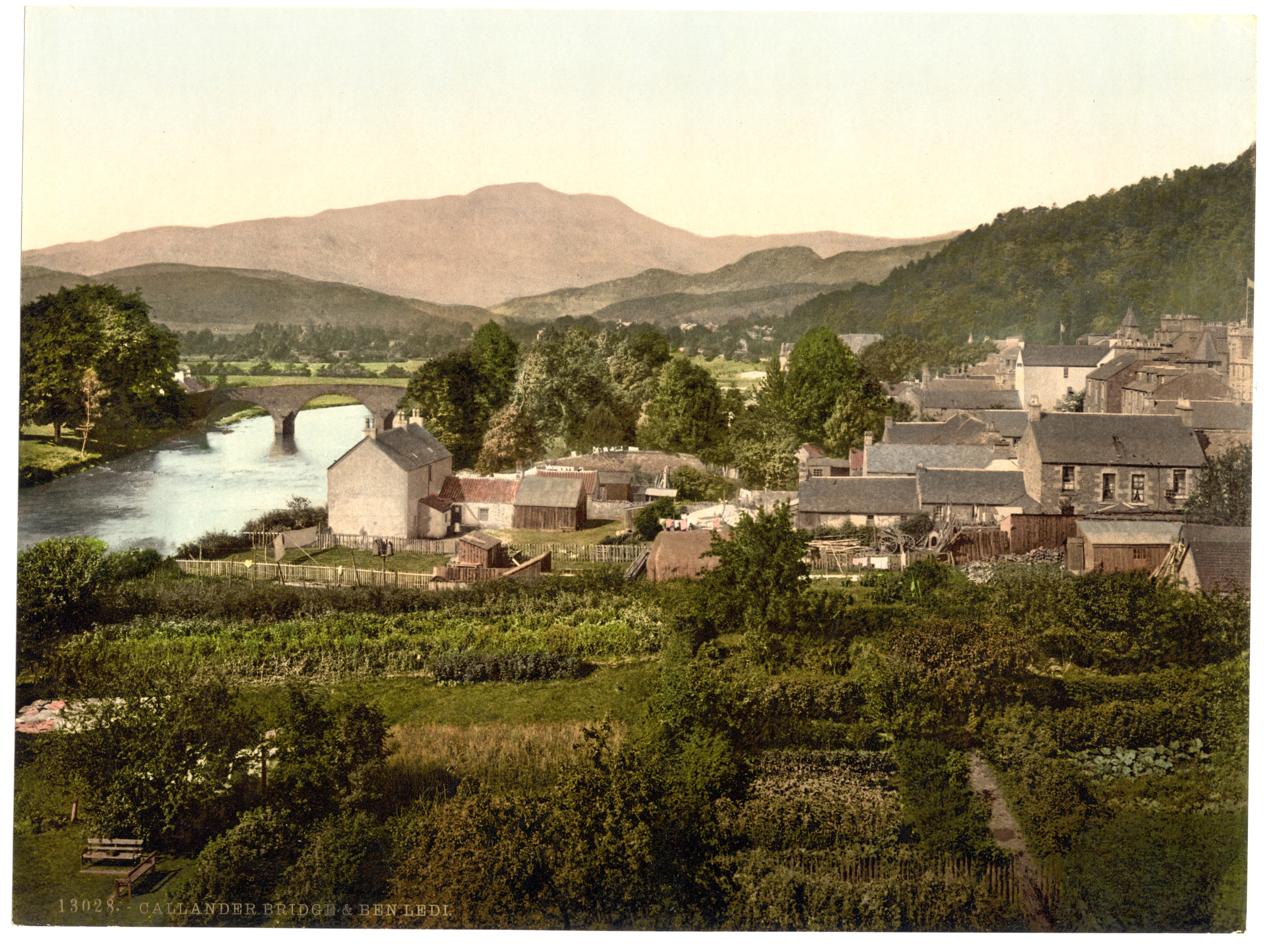
Callander Bridge

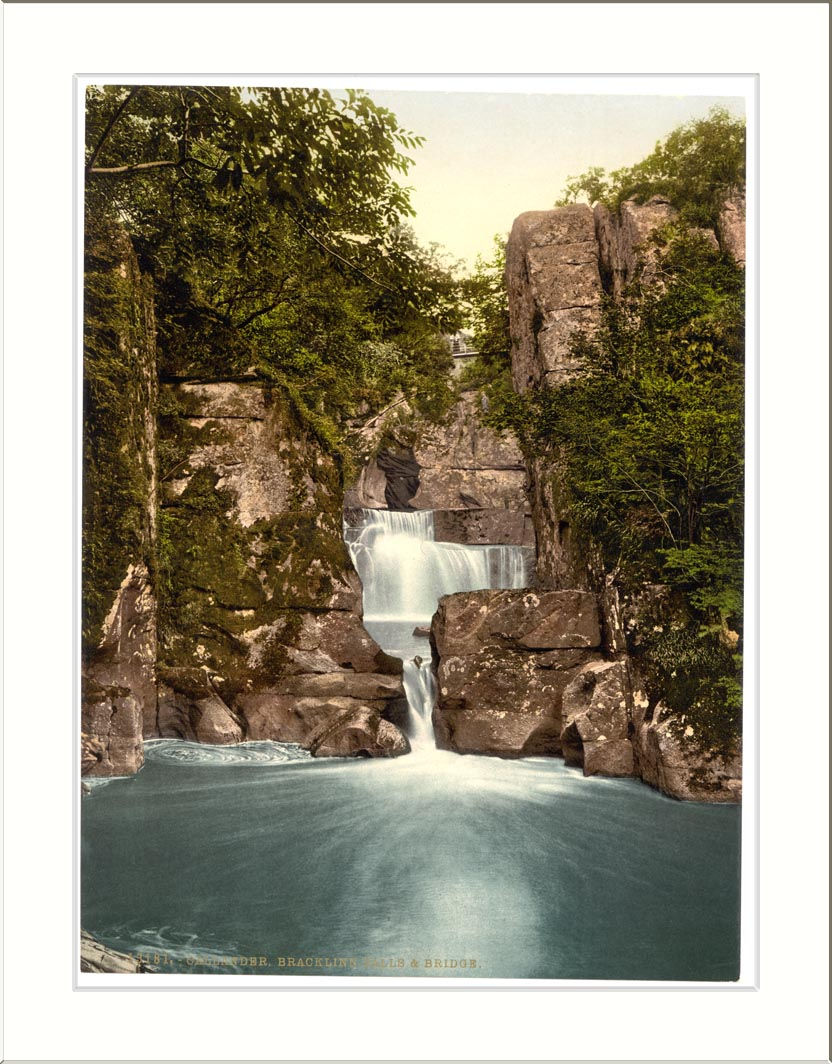
Bracklinn Falls
