= David Limond =

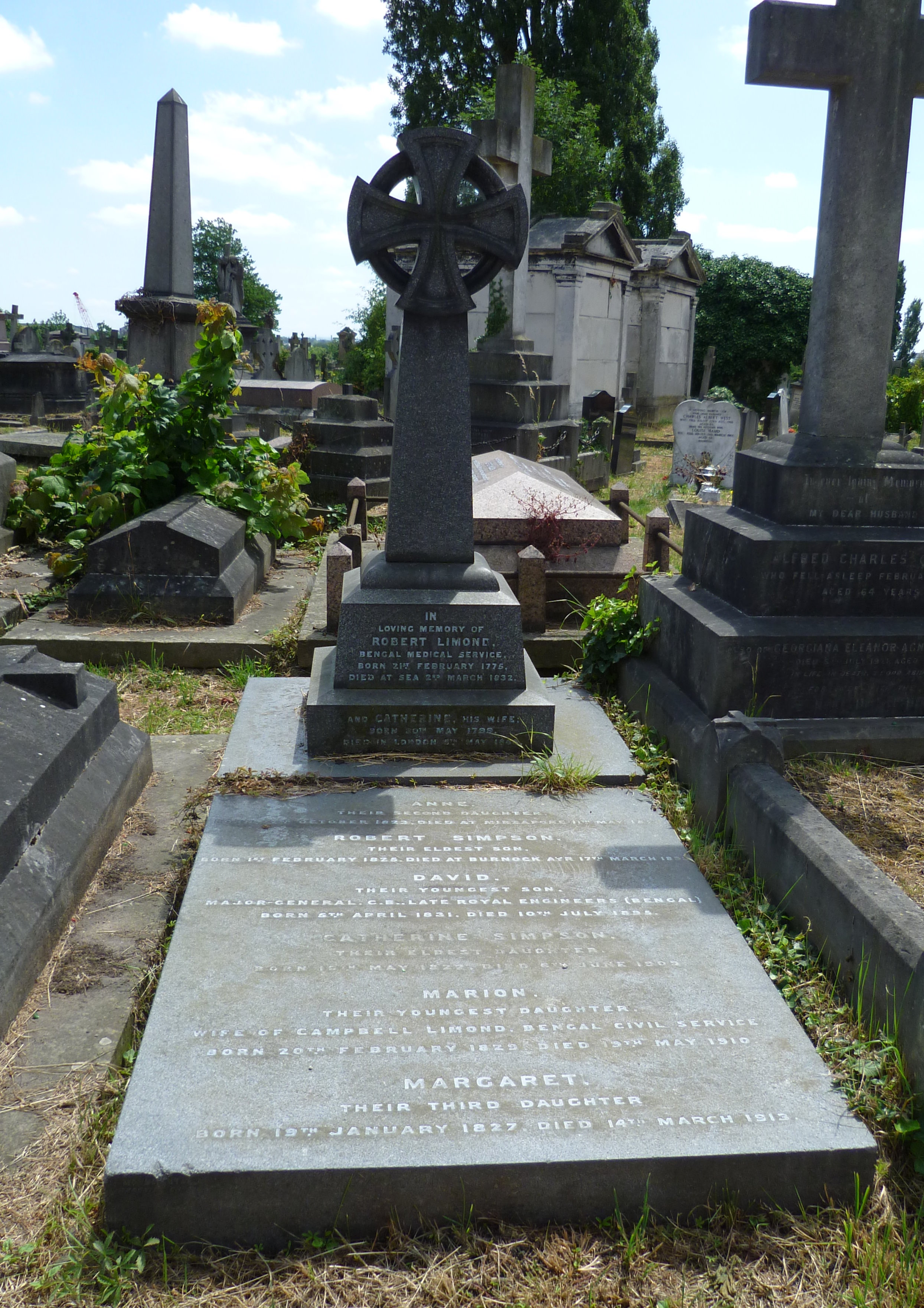
Grave of the Limond family at Kensal Green Cemetery

Major-General David Limond C.B. (5 April 1831 – 10 July 1895) was a British soldier of the Royal Engineers (Bengal) and a member of a family with a strong tradition of military service.

== Military career ==
Early in his career, Limond was with the Lucknow garrison in 1857 at the time of the Indian Mutiny. Later, he was commanding Royal Engineer (as Lieutenant-Colonel) with companies of the Bengal Sappers of the Khyber Division during the Second Anglo-Afghan War (1878–80).

Following the conclusion of that war, Limond was made a Companion of the Bath in 1881, one of a number of officers who were honoured or promoted following the cessation of hostilities.

== Family ==
Limond's father was Robert Limond (1775-1832) (died at sea) of the Bengal Medical Service and his mother was Catherine Limond (born 1799). David had siblings Anne, Robert Simpson, Catherine Simpson, Marion, and Margaret.

His son, Alexander Limond, a Lieutenant in the 6th Punjab Infantry, died of injuries inflicted by "Ghazi fanatics" at Camp Boya at the close of the Waziristan Campaign on 14 May 1895 according to an inscription in the church at Sandhurst.

== Death ==
Limond died on 10 July 1895, not long after his son Alexander died on active service. David Limond is buried at Kensal Green Cemetery along with his parents and siblings. A memorial plaque to him is located in the Trossachs Parish Church, to the west of the village of Brig o' Turk overlooking Loch Achray in Stirling. The memorial includes the brass figure of a centurion and a hunting scene.
