= Bicycle Tree =

Tree in Stirling, Scotland

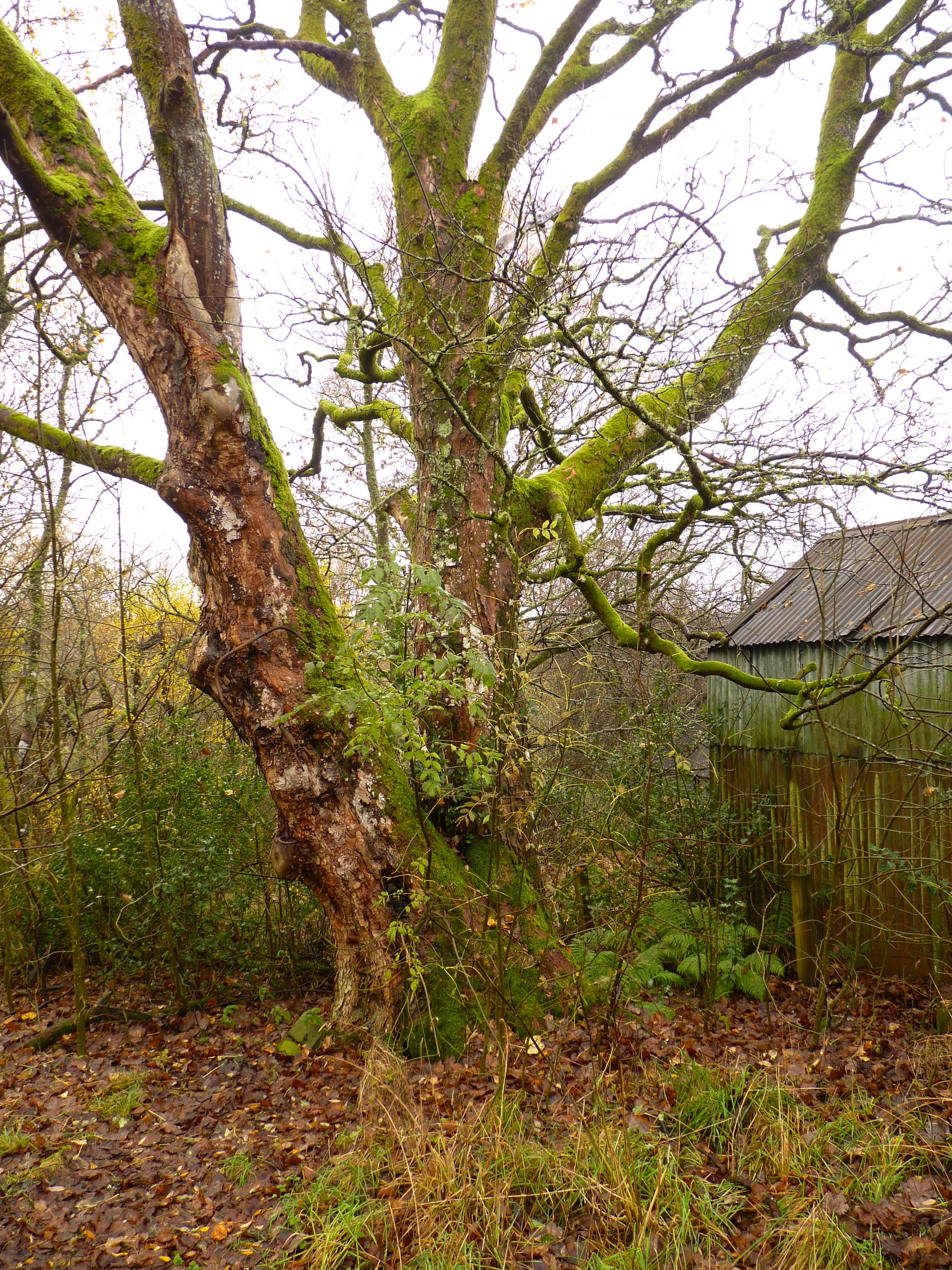
- Interactive map of Bicycle Tree
- Species: Sycamore (Acer pseudoplatanus)
- Location: Brig o' Turk, the Trossachs, Scotland
- Coordinates: 56.2307°N 4.3655°W
- Date seeded: circa 1860–1900

The Bicycle Tree is a veteran tree near Brig o' Turk in the Trossachs, Scotland. Dating from the late 19th century, the tree grew in or near to the scrap heap of the village blacksmith and has encapsulated several metal objects over the years. Most notably this includes an early 20th-century bicycle (from which it received its name) and, reputedly, a ship's anchor and chain. The Bicycle Tree is recognized as a landmark of the local area and has become a tourist attraction. It was granted the protection of a Tree Preservation Order by the Loch Lomond and The Trossachs National Park Authority in March 2016.

== Description ==
The Bicycle Tree, a sycamore (Acer pseudoplatanus), is situated approximately .5 miles (0.80 km) north of the Trossachs village of Brig o' Turk in Scotland. It lies in the north-west corner of a parcel of land known as Dorothy's Field which lies south of the road leading to the Glen Finglas dam. Dorothy's Field is unmanaged land containing scattered trees and vegetation. The main trunk of the bicycle tree splits into two at around 1 metre (3 ft 3 in) above ground level.

== History ==
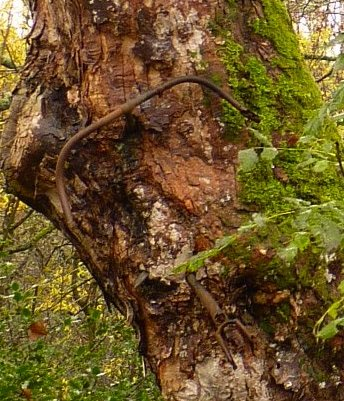
A view of the bicycle frame and handlebars protruding from the tree

The tree is thought to have self-seeded approximately 1860–1900 on or near the site of a blacksmith's scrap heap. After the death of the blacksmith in 1923, the smithy closed down and the land was abandoned, allowing the tree to grow unhindered. Dozens of metal items from the scrap heap, or which had been hung on the tree, have become encapsulated partially or wholly within its bark. This is thought to have included a horse's bridle, and a ship's anchor and chain. Most notably the frame and handlebars of an early 20th-century bicycle can be seen protruding from the bark. The tree is often described as having "eaten" the metal objects or else having the metal "growing out of it".

Several stories have attached themselves to the tree, including that the bicycle was left by a villager conscripted to fight in the First World War. The villager is said variously to have died in combat or else to have been away so long that the bicycle was absorbed by the tree before he returned. Studies of the tree have shown that it does not appear to have suffered any adverse effect from the metal it has encapsulated, being in fair condition with a life expectancy of 40 to 100 years.

== Recent events ==
The Bicycle Tree has been a tourist attraction since the late 1990s and has been described as "one of Scotland's greatest arboricultural curiosities". It was listed as one of the country's 130 "most remarkable trees" by the Forestry Commission in the 2006 book Heritage Trees of Scotland. The tree was assessed for a tree preservation order (TPO) by the Loch Lomond and The Trossachs National Park Authority in 2007; this would have granted it legal protection from felling, pruning, or other damage, but it was decided against granting the order. The Bicycle Tree was surveyed during the Woodland Trust Ancient Tree Hunt of 2009 and the 2013 Trossachs Countryside Trust veteran tree survey. The tree was granted temporary TPO protection in December 2015 following an eight-year campaign by a local author; this was upgraded to a permanent TPO in March 2016. As a local landmark, the tree features in the logo of the local primary school, and the village newsletter is named after it.

== See also ==
- Hungry Tree, a London Plane in Dublin encapsulating a park bench
- List of individual trees
