= Ben A'an =

Hill in Stirling, Scotland

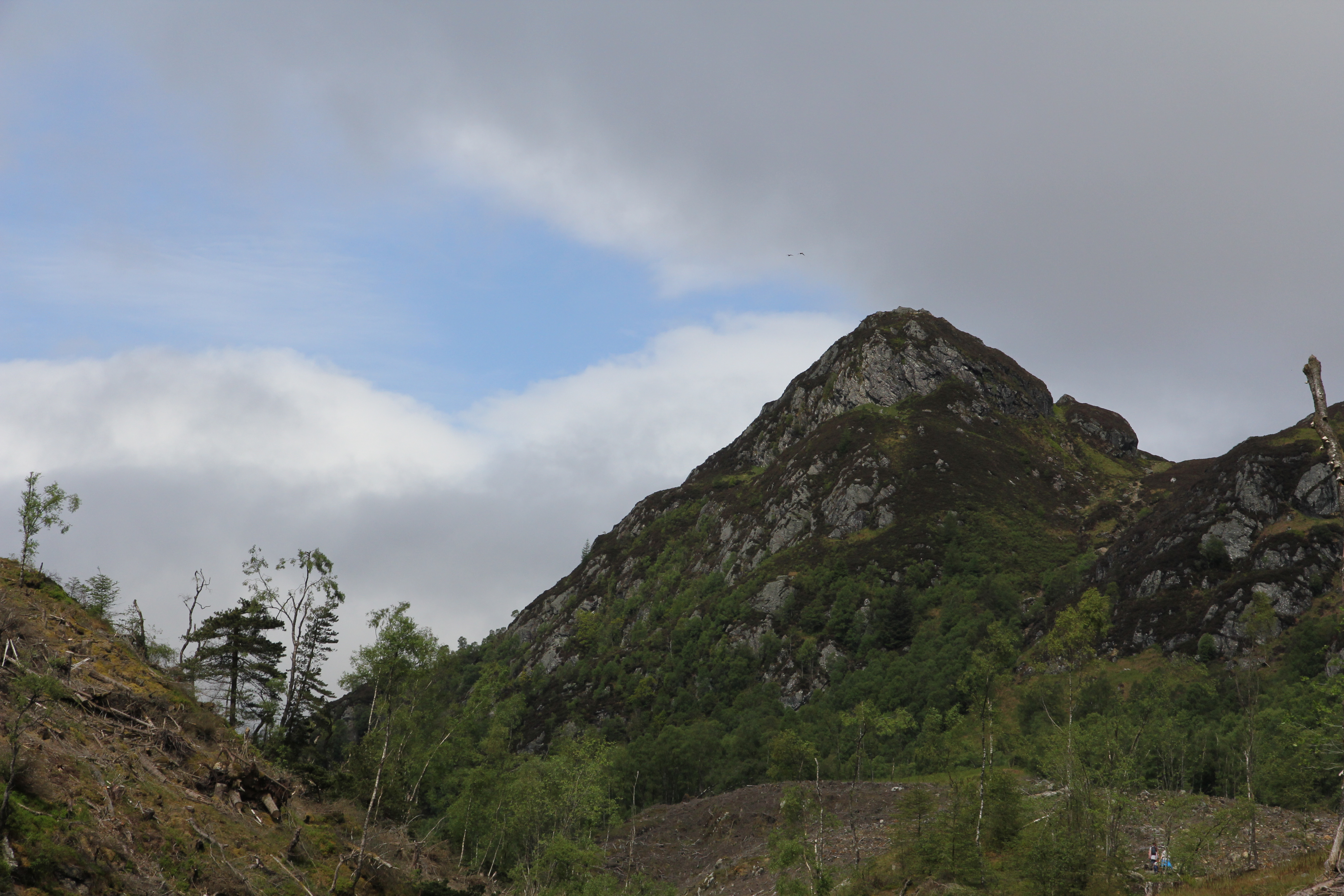
- The hill of Ben A'an in the Scottish Highlands

Highest point
- Elevation: 454 m (1,490 ft)
- Coordinates: 56.2427°N 4.4188°W

Naming
- English translation: Small Pointed Peak
- Language of name: Scottish Gaelic

Geography
- Location within Scotland
- Location: Stirling (council area), Scotland
- Parent range: Trossachs
- OS grid: NN 502 082
- Topo map: OS Landranger 57

Ben A'an is a hill in the Trossachs in Scotland. The pointed peak of its west top (454 metres or 1,490 feet in elevation) resembles a small mountain.

== Location ==
Ben A'an is situated in the Trossachs area of the highlands north of Glasgow, rising above Loch Katrine and Loch Achray. The summit area is largely treeless and comprises several rock outcrops and crags, its highest point being a rounded summit of 454 metres (1,490 feet) elevation, unlike its lower west top.

== Ascent ==
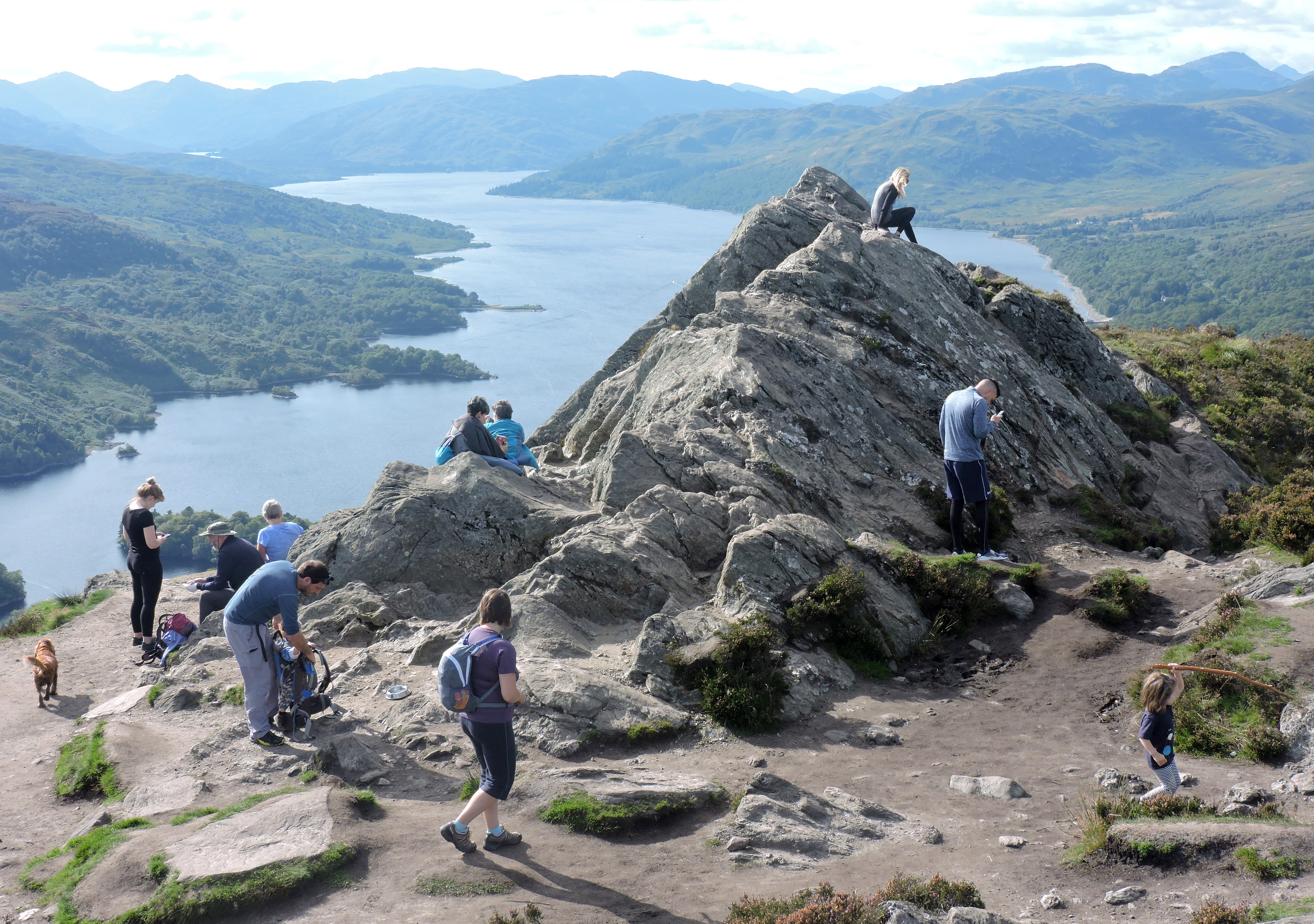
HIkers near Ben A'an's summit

The normal route is from the pay and display car park of "Ben An" (sic) by the shore of Loch Achray. From there the signed path heads straight uphill in a north-northeasterly direction before picking up the course of a burn, the Allt Inneir, and heading north-northwest up to a low saddle (246 m). The path crosses the saddle heading northwest before picking up the course of another burn, the Allt na Cailliche, and following it steeply uphill below the crags of Ben A'an. Close to the source of the burn the path swings westwards and behind the west top of the hill onto a col, from which it is a short climb to the summit of the west top which is the destination for most hikers. There is no obvious path to the main summit.

== Views ==
Even though Ben A’an is not particularly high, it offers panoramic views of the surrounding lochs, glens, straths and mountains, including Loch Katrine, Loch Achray, Ben Venue and even as far as the Arrochar Alps on the western shore of Loch Lomond.

== Name ==
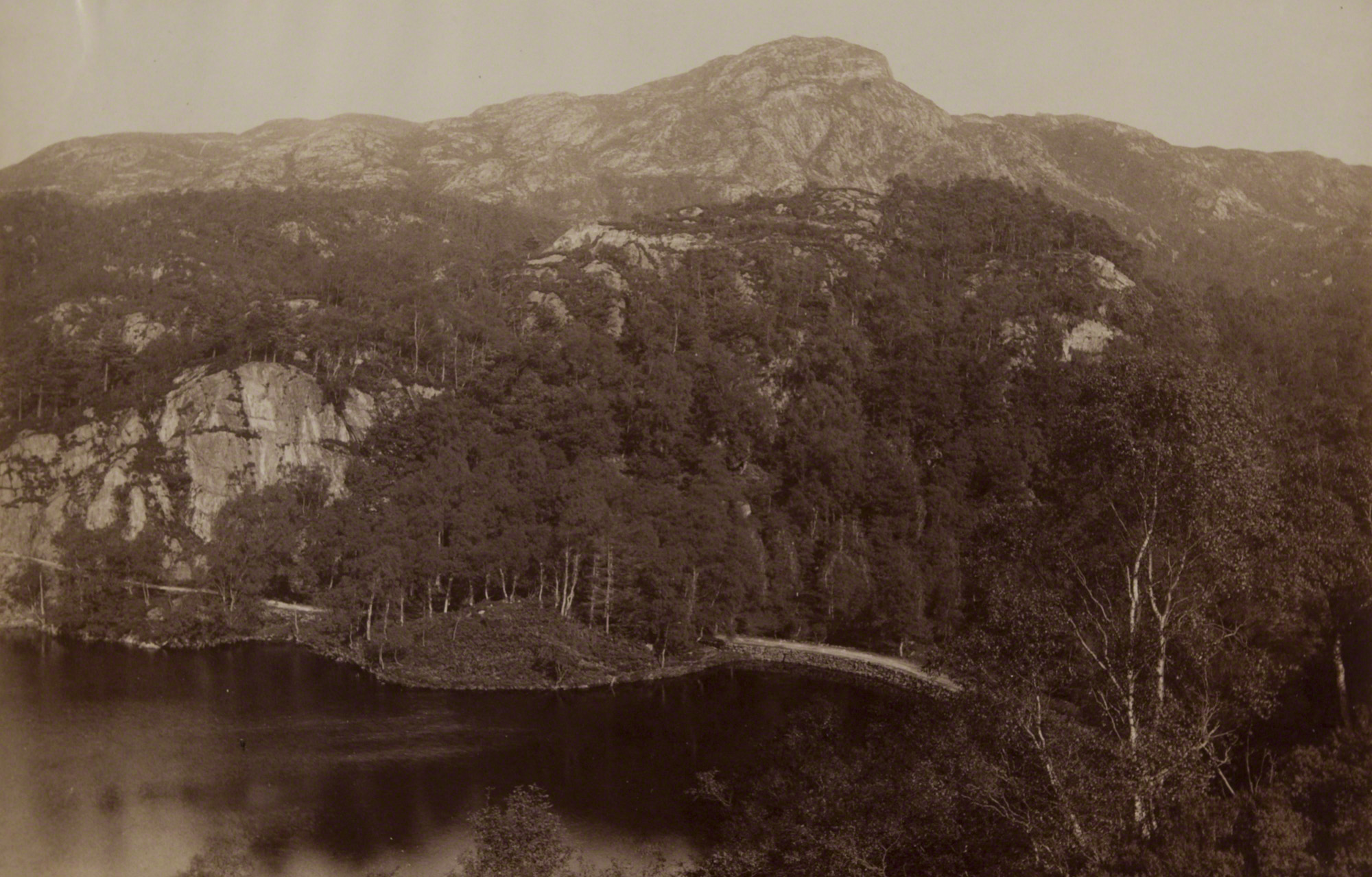
The hill in a James Valentine picture

The name "Ben A’an" is an erroneous Anglicization by Sir Walter Scott. Its original name is uncertain, but it has been suggested that it may have been Am Binnean which means "the pinnacle", although some sites cite its meaning as "the small pointed peak".
