= Ben Venue =

Mountain in Stirling, Scotland

Coordinates: 56.225006°N 4.461986°W

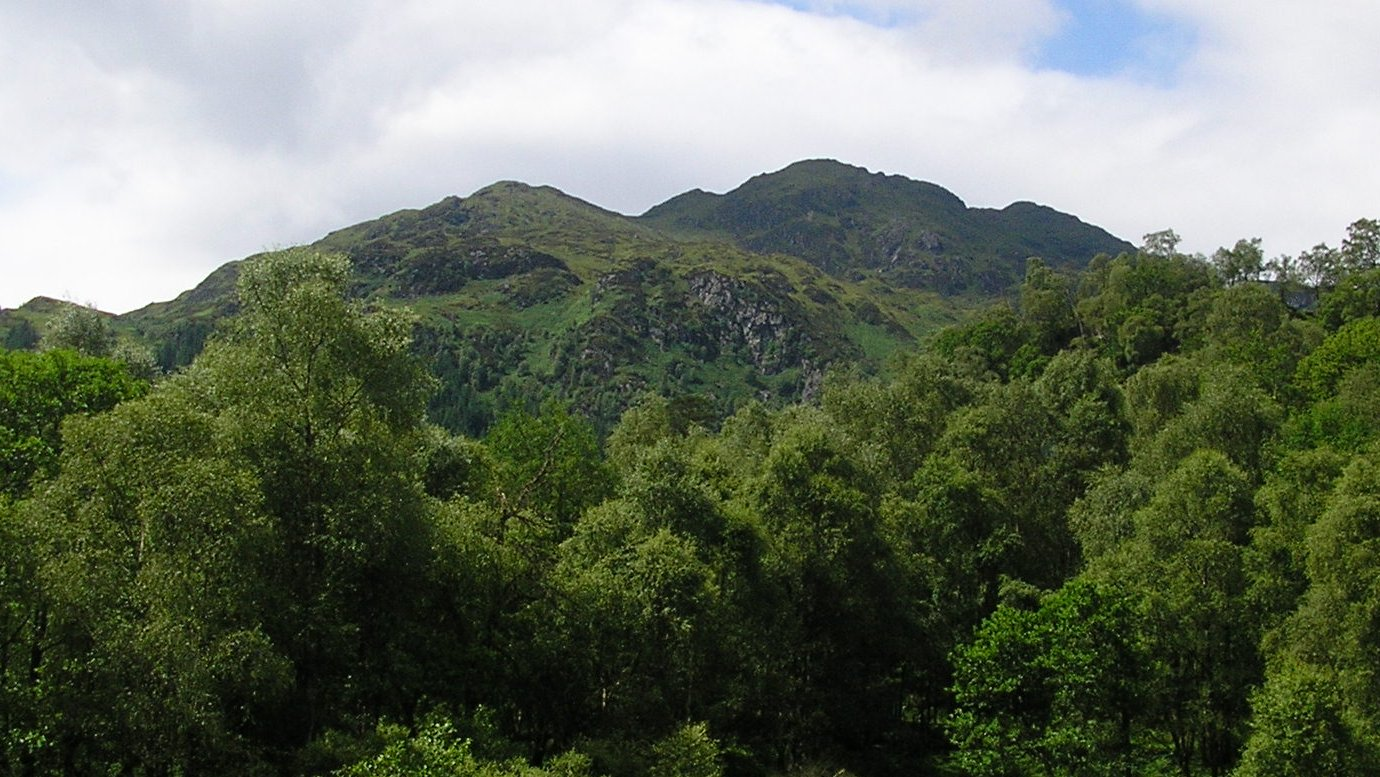
- Ben Venue and Achray Forest

Highest point
- Elevation: 729.5 m (2,393 ft)
- Prominence: c. 545 m
- Parent peak: Ben Lomond
- Listing: Marilyn, Graham

Naming
- English translation: The Miniature Mountain
- Language of name: Scottish Gaelic

Geography
- Location: Stirling (council area), Scotland
- Parent range: Trossachs
- OS grid: NN477061
- Topo map: OS Landranger 57

Ben Venue (Scottish Gaelic: A' Bheinn Mheanbh) is a mountain in the Trossachs area of Scotland. The name Ben Venue is derived from the Scottish Gaelic words meaning "the miniature mountain". The summit lies approximately 2 kilometres south-west of the pier at the southern end of Loch Katrine. At the foot of the mountain close to the shore of Loch Katrine is Bealach nam Bò meaning the "pass of the cattle", a reference to the lawless days when Highland cattle "lifters" used the pass to drive stolen herds to their land.

Ben Venue is a popular walk and can be accessed from either Ledard farm track at Loch Ard, via the Beinn an Fhogharaidh ridge, or from the car park at the head of Loch Achray: both routes are approximately 5 km in length. A sign in the forestry warns that the mountain should not be approached or descended directly to or from Loch Katrine, as the slopes on this side are very steep and littered with dangerous cliffs. Several indistinct paths do exist on this side of the hill however.

Ben Venue has two summits a short distance apart. The triangulation pillar on the eastern summit has a height of 728.1 m above sea level, and this height is often given as the height of Ben Venue as a whole. However the western summit is shown to be slightly higher, 729.5 m, on the Ordnance Survey's 1:25000 map. From (either) summit on a clear day the view extend to the Firth of Forth, the Clyde and Isle of Arran and the Paps of Jura. Good views can be seen along Loch Katrine, Ben A'an, Ben More, Stob Binnein, Ben Lomond and the Arrochar Alps.
