= Hungry Tree =

Tree in Dublin, Ireland

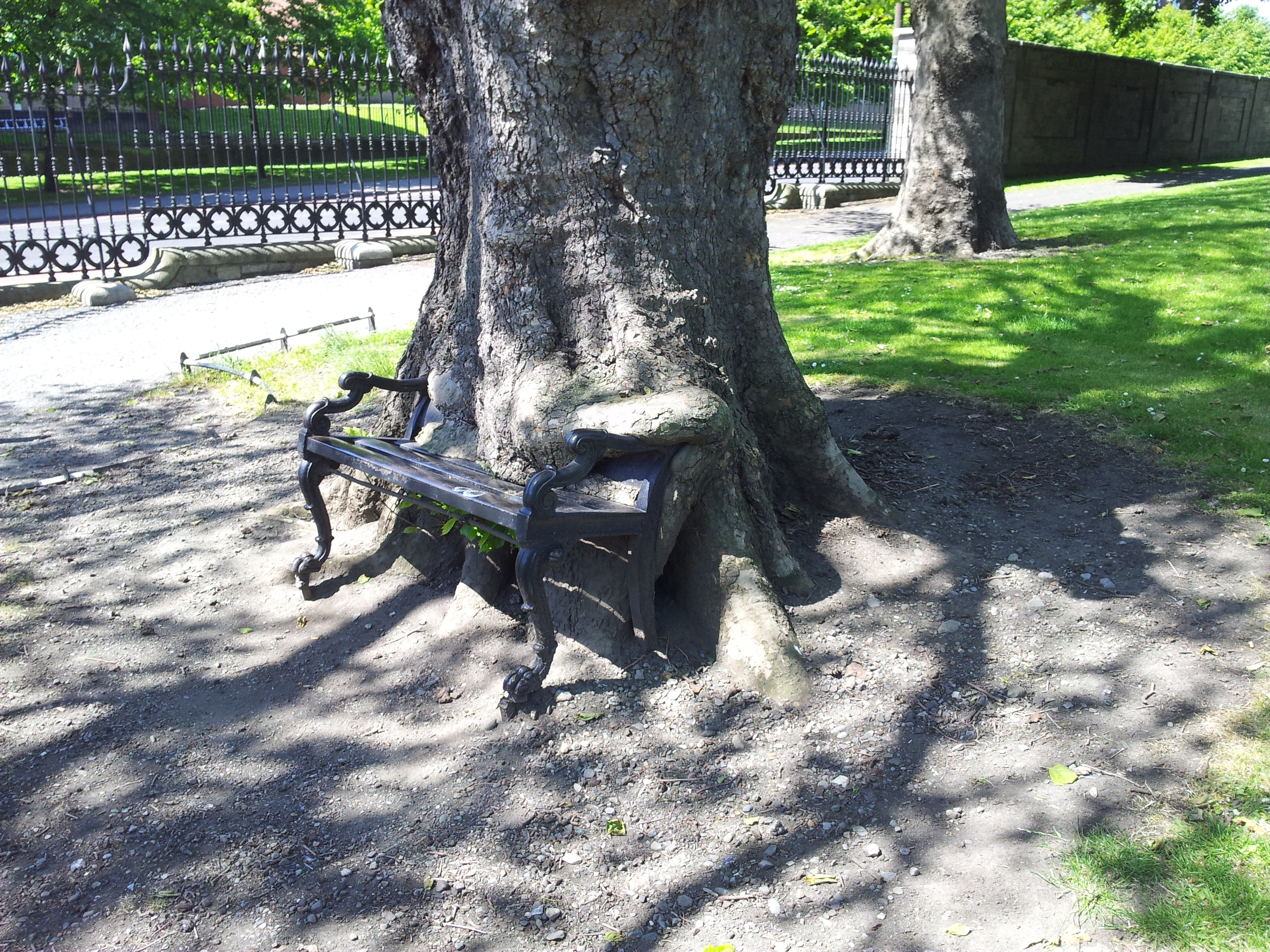
- The Hungry Tree and bench
- Species: London plane (Platanus × hispanica)
- Location: King's Inns, Dublin
- Coordinates: 53.3521°N 6.2731°W
- Date seeded: circa 1900–1940

The Hungry Tree is a tree in the grounds of the King's Inns in Dublin, Ireland. An otherwise unremarkable specimen of the London plane, it has become known for having partially consumed a nearby park bench. It has become a tourist attraction and is frequently photographed. The Hungry Tree was the subject of a campaign by Green Party politician Ciarán Cuffe to ensure its preservation.

== Description ==
The tree lies just inside the south gate of the grounds of the King's Inns (the Irish inn of court) on Constitution Hill in Dublin. It is a London plane (Platanus × hispanica) of the type widely planted in Dublin in the 19th century. It has been estimated to be between 80 and 120 years old. The tree, described as an unremarkable specimen "mediocre in appearance", is 21 metres (69 ft) in height and 3.47 metres (11.4 ft) in girth.

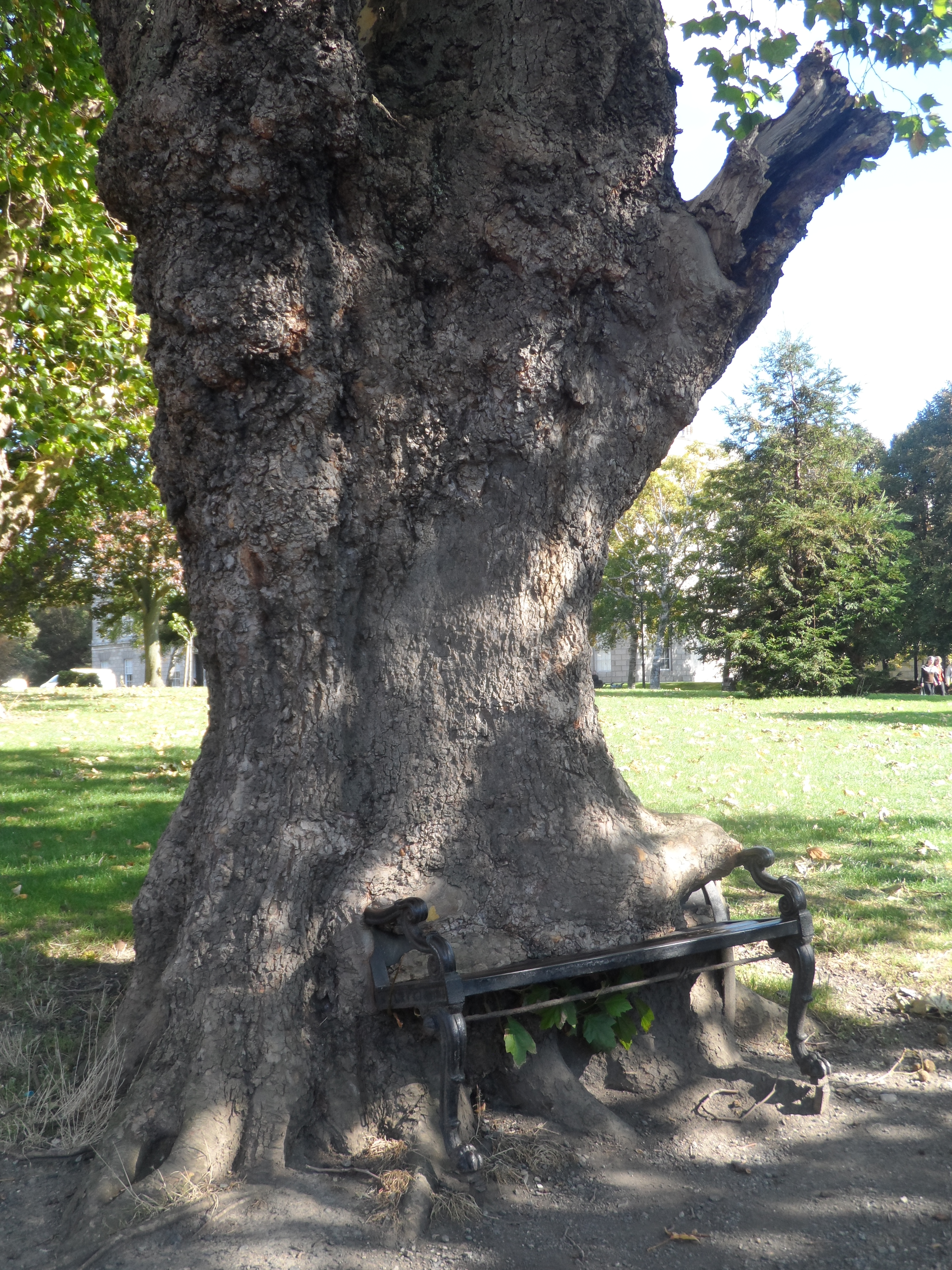
Hungry Tree in 2018

The tree was planted adjacent to a cast iron bench dating from the early 1800s. Over decades the tree has grown to encompass the bench. The tree is said to be "eating" the bench, which is how its name originated. The grounds of King's Inns are open to the public between 7 a.m. and 7.30 p.m. every day and the tree has become something of a tourist attraction. It is much photographed and has appeared on the cover of the tourist guidebook Secret Dublin – an unusual guide and in artist Robert Ballagh's 1981 book Dublin.

== Preservation campaign ==
The tree has been listed as one of the country's "Heritage Trees" by the Tree Council of Ireland. It has been listed largely for its value as a curiosity and tourist attraction rather than its age or rarity.

Green Party councillor Ciarán Cuffe campaigned in 2017 for the Dublin Central Area Committee to grant the tree a version of the UK tree preservation order (TPO). Cuffe stated that the Hungry Tree and neighbouring trees "are a lovely part of the history of the north inner city. A bit like the Blessington Street Basin, it is a hidden gem. I love it and I’d hate to lose it... They have witnessed history and they are all the more precious for their age." The application for the TPO was refused as it was considered that the tree lay within the curtilage of other structures and by extension benefited from the protections already granted to these buildings. Consideration was given to listing the bench as a protected structure but was decided against as there could then have been a requirement imposed on the council to destroy the tree to protect the bench.

== See also ==
- Bicycle Tree (Trossachs), a sycamore in Scotland that has encapsulated a bicycle
- List of individual trees
