= Brig o' Turk =

Village in Stirling, Scotland

Coordinates: 56.229°N 4.364°W

Brig o' Turk: Scottish Gaelic: Drochaid Tuirc
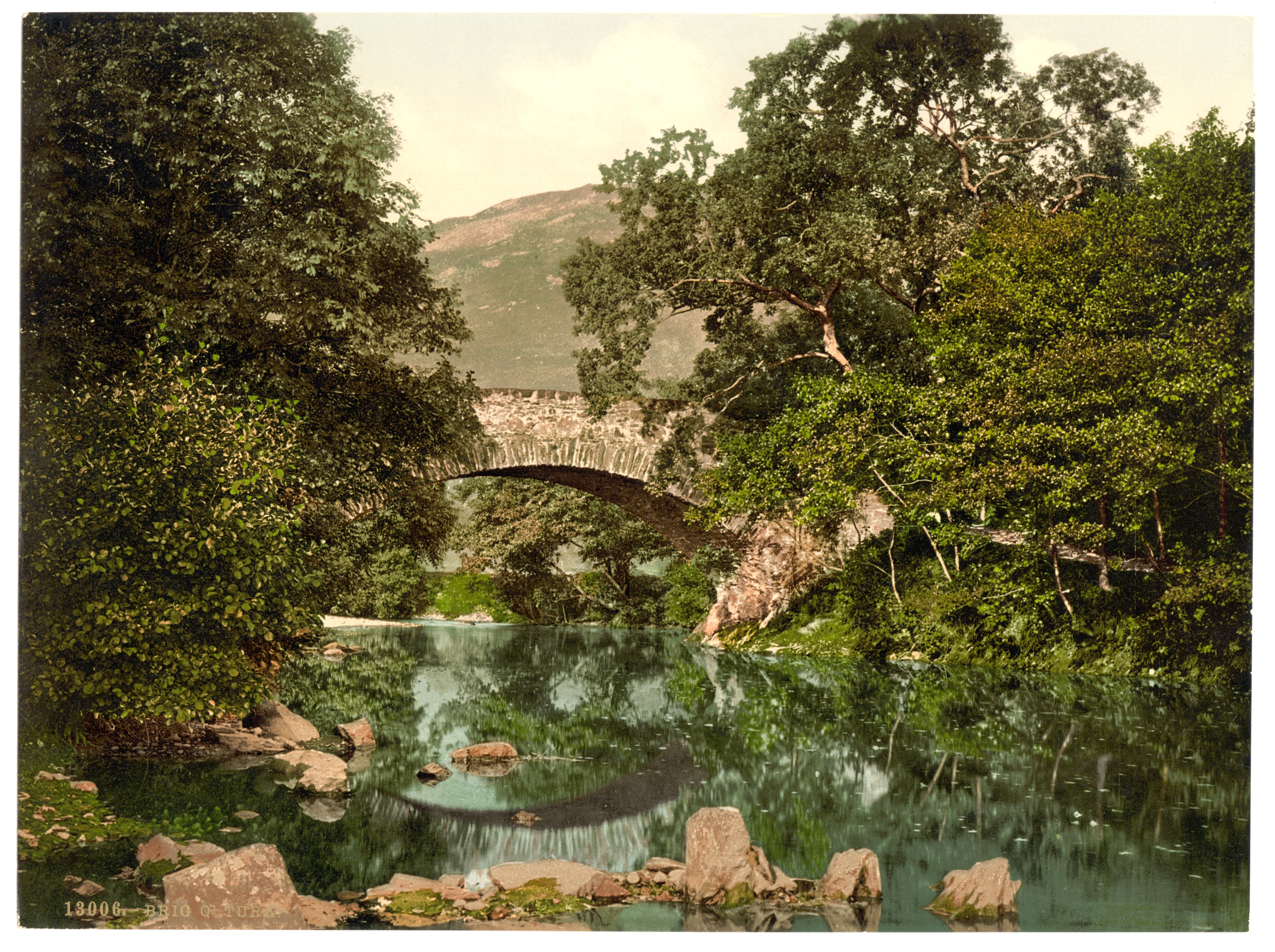
- The eponymous Brig o' Turk

- Location within the Stirling council area
- OS grid reference: NN535065
- Civil parish: Callander
- Council area: Stirling
- Lieutenancy area: Stirling and Falkirk
- Country: Scotland
- Sovereign state: United Kingdom
- Post town: CALLANDER
- Postcode district: FK17
- Dialling code: 01877
- Police: Scotland
- Fire: Scottish
- Ambulance: Scottish
- UK Parliament: Stirling
- Scottish Parliament: Stirling

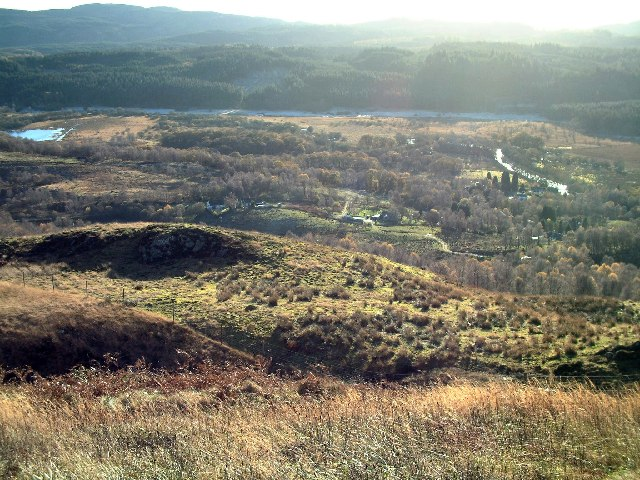
Brig o' Turk from Glen Finglass Forest

Brig o' Turk (Scottish Gaelic: Drochaid Tuirc) is a small rural village historically in Perthshire and today within the council area of Stirling, Scotland. It is situated in the Trossachs, a range of hills on the A821 road.

== Features ==
Brig o' Turk has a rare 1930s wooden tea room, which featured in the 1959 remake of The 39 Steps. Brig o' Turk also features a village hall which hosts many craft fairs, dances and other events, a small primary school (Trossachs Primary of 1875) serving the village and the surrounding areas, a small post office (located in someone's house) and a pub-restaurant, called The Byre Inn, which is made to look like the cow barn attached to the large neighbouring house, Dundarroch. The Bicycle Tree, located half a mile north of the village, is a local landmark and tourist attraction.

=== Trossachs Parish Church ===
The Church of Scotland parish church, called the Trossachs Parish Church, is located to the west of the village overlooking Loch Achray. It was built in 1849 in the early Gothic style, to cater for tourists visiting the area. It contains a memorial plaque to Major-General David Limond C.B. (1831–1895), a veteran of the Siege of Lucknow in the Indian Mutiny. The church, together with the graveyard and boundary wall, is a Category C(S) listed building.

== History ==
=== Etymology ===
The village is named after the Brig o' Turk, which spans the River Turk a short distance west of the village. The current bridge was built in 1796, although bridges have crossed the river since 1451.

=== Jacobite insurgency ===
In 1708, Brig o' Turk was the venue for a gathering of prominent Jacobite lairds in support of the expected invasion by James Stuart, the "Old Pretender". In the event, the commander of the French fleet of 30 ships carrying James's 6,000-strong force withdrew rather than risk an action with the Royal Navy; however, the gathering later was used as evidence of treason against the participants.

=== Ruskin ===
In the mid nineteenth century the village was the location of a famous Victorian love triangle involving John Ruskin, his wife Effie Gray, and protégé John Everett Millais.

== Community ==
There are a number of community groups based in the area such as the Trossachs Welfare association, Trossachs Community Council and Trossachs Community Trust.
