= SS Sir Walter Scott =

Small steamship ferry service on Loch Katrine in the scenic Trossachs of Scotland

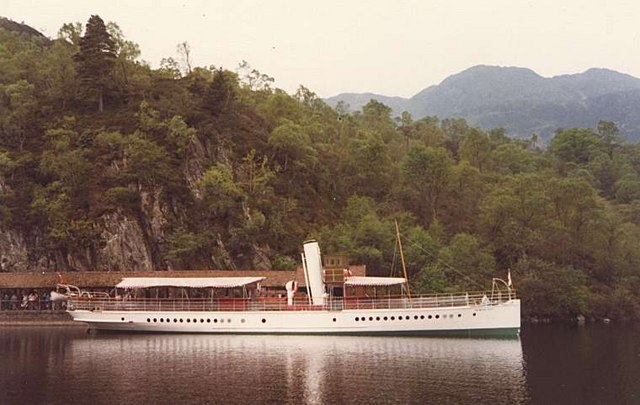
- Sir Walter Scott at Trossachs Pier, 1981

History

United Kingdom
- Name: Sir Walter Scott
- Namesake: Sir Walter Scott
- Port of registry: (United Kingdom) Glasgow
- Route: Loch Katrine
- Builder: William Denny and Brothers
- Cost: £4,269
- Yard number: 623
- Launched: 1900
- Completed: 1900
- Identification: Official Number 111266
- Status: In Service

General characteristics
- Class & type: Pleasure steamer
- Tonnage: 115 grt
- Length: 110 ft (34 m)
- Beam: 19 ft (5.8 m)
- Depth: 9.6 ft (2.9 m)
- Installed power: Three-cylinder triple-expansion steam engine
- Propulsion: Propeller
- Crew: Five

SS Sir Walter Scott is a small steamship that has provided pleasure cruises and a ferry service on Loch Katrine in the scenic Trossachs of Scotland for more than a century, and is the only surviving screw steamer in regular passenger service in Scotland. She is named after the writer Walter Scott, who set his 1810 poem Lady of the Lake, and his 1818 novel Rob Roy around Loch Katrine.

In 1859 Loch Katrine became Glasgow's main water supply, connected by aqueducts and tunnels to the city more than 30 miles (50 kilometres) away through a hilly landscape. The Trossachs became very popular in the Victorian era, and there were early steamship services on the loch. The Loch is surrounded by wooded mountains, and has romantic historical connections including the birthplace of the outlaw Rob Roy MacGregor. Queen Victoria had a holiday house built overlooking the loch.

William Denny and Brothers built Sir Walter Scott as a "knock-down" ship; that is, the steamer was assembled with bolts and nuts at Denny's shipyard at Dumbarton on the River Leven in 1899, launched and undertook performance trials in the Firth of Clyde, including recording her speed on the measured mile. She was then dismantled and the numbered pieces were transported by barge up Loch Lomond and overland by horse-drawn cart to Stronachlachar pier on Loch Katrine where the steamer was reassembled with permanent rivets and, in 1900, relaunched. The original cost was £4,269, which included a delivery charge of £2,028.

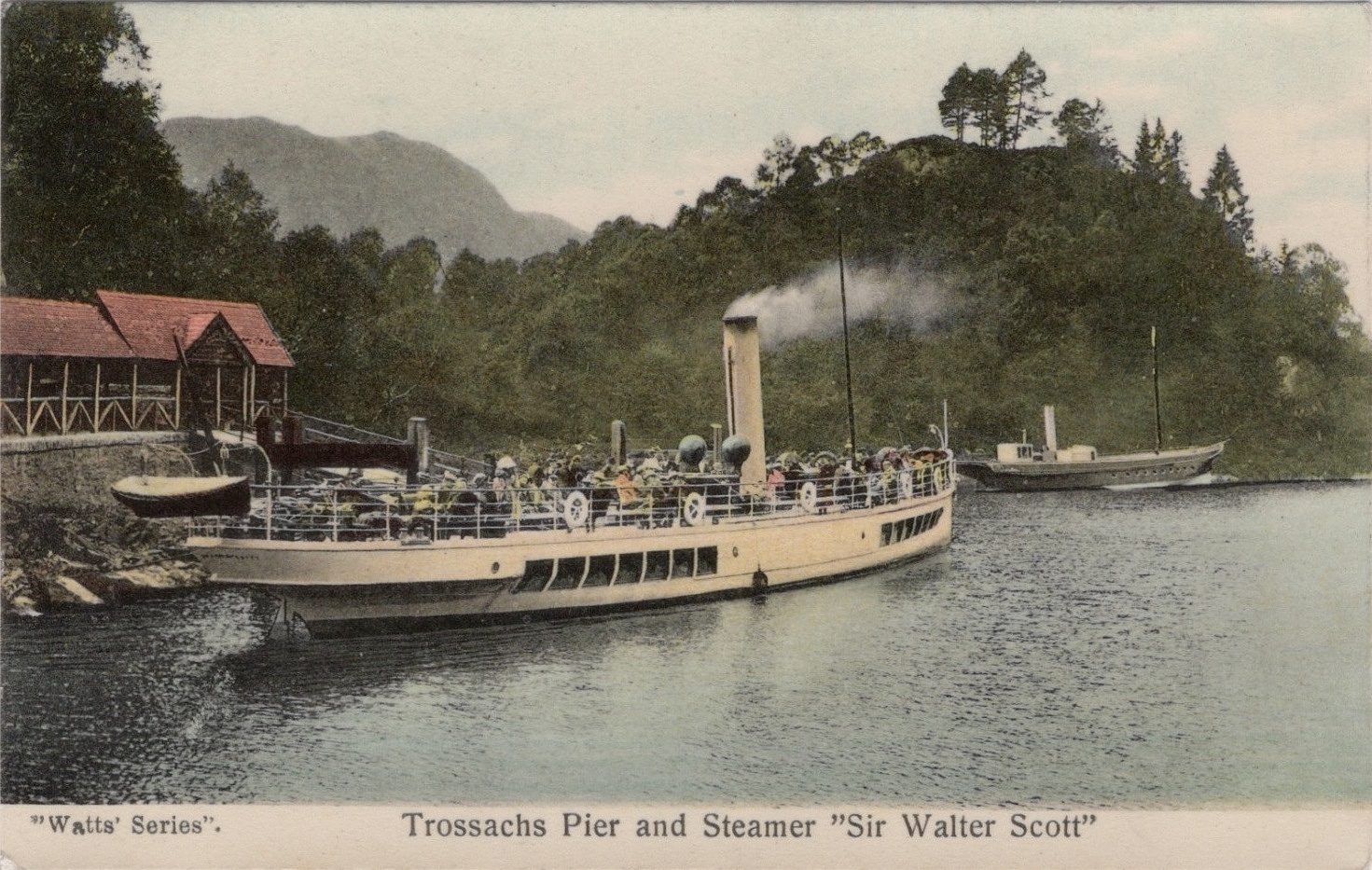
Sir Walter Scott, as built

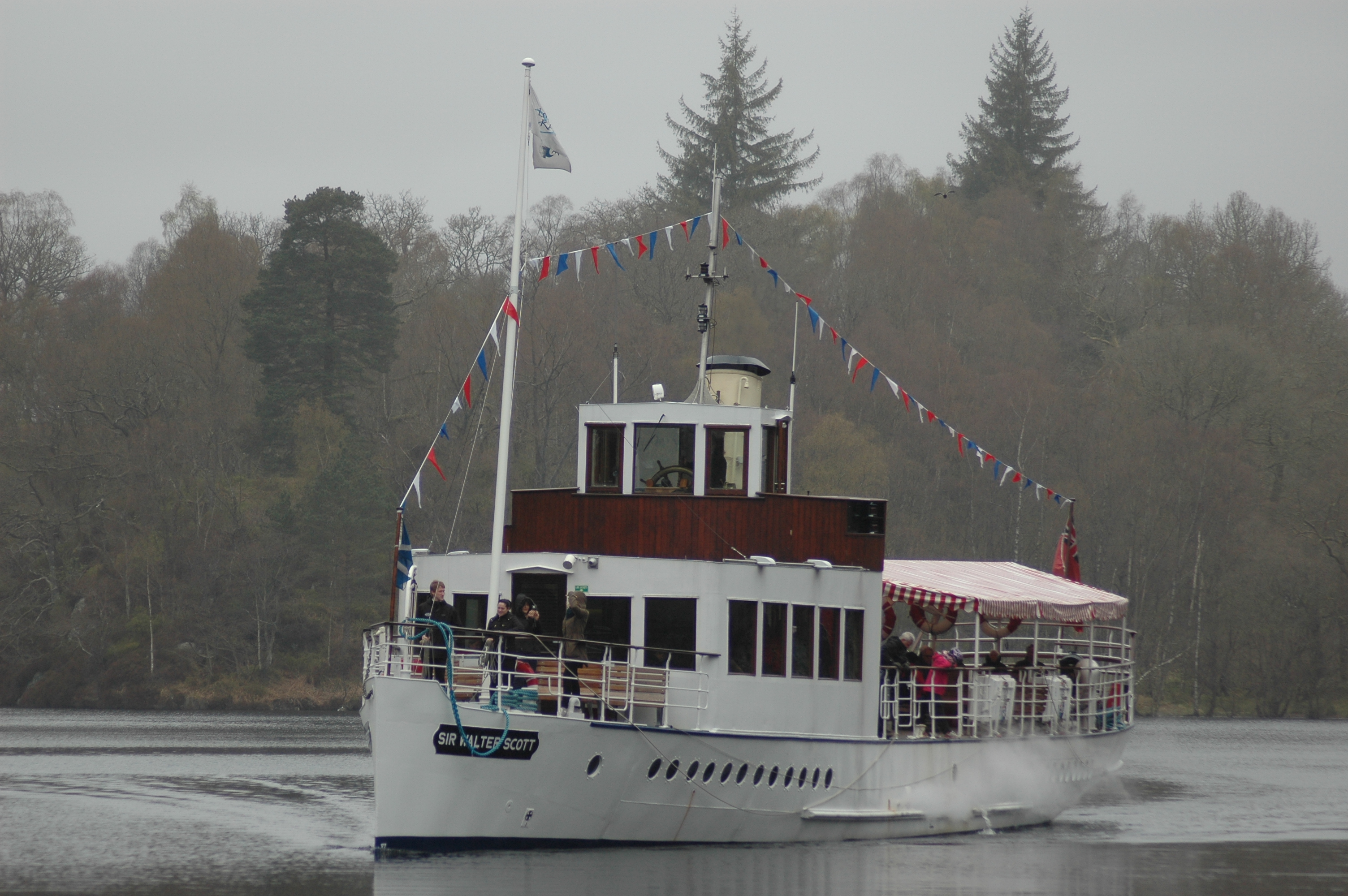
Sir Walter Scott, in 2013

Sir Walter Scott measures 115 gross register tons, is 110 feet (34 metres) long and has a 19-foot (5.8-metre) beam. She is powered by the original three-cylinder triple-expansion steam engine made by Matthew Paul & Company, Dumbarton, and has two locomotive-type boilers which until the end of 2007 were fired by solid fuel fed into the firebox by a stoker. At a time when most steamers changed to oil-fired boilers, Sir Walter Scott kept using solid fuel to meet the requirement of ensuring that Glasgow's water supply was not polluted, changing from coal to coke to reduce air pollution. In a refit at the end of the 2007 season the boilers were altered to run on biofuel. During this refit, the superstructure was rebuilt and a forward deck cabin was added. The vessel has a crew of five.

Sir Walter Scott sails from Trossachs pier at the east end of the loch, 7 miles (11 kilometres) northwest of Callander and runs a ferry service 8 miles (13 kilometres) west along the loch to Stronachlachar pier. She runs in the morning at 10:30, taking walkers and cyclists who return by land. She then takes those embarking at the pier and those doing the round trip back to Trossachs pier. In the afternoon she also does one or more shorter scenic cruises. Between January and March the ship is taken up on a slipway for maintenance work. A second boat, Lady of the Lake, runs return trips to Stonachlachar in the summer months and also runs between January and March on Wednesdays, Saturdays and Sundays.

== See also ==
- List of ships built by William Denny and Brothers
- List of oldest surviving ships
