= The Athole Highlanders' Farewell to Loch Katrine =

Scottish march music

"The Athole Highlanders Farewell to Loch Katrine"
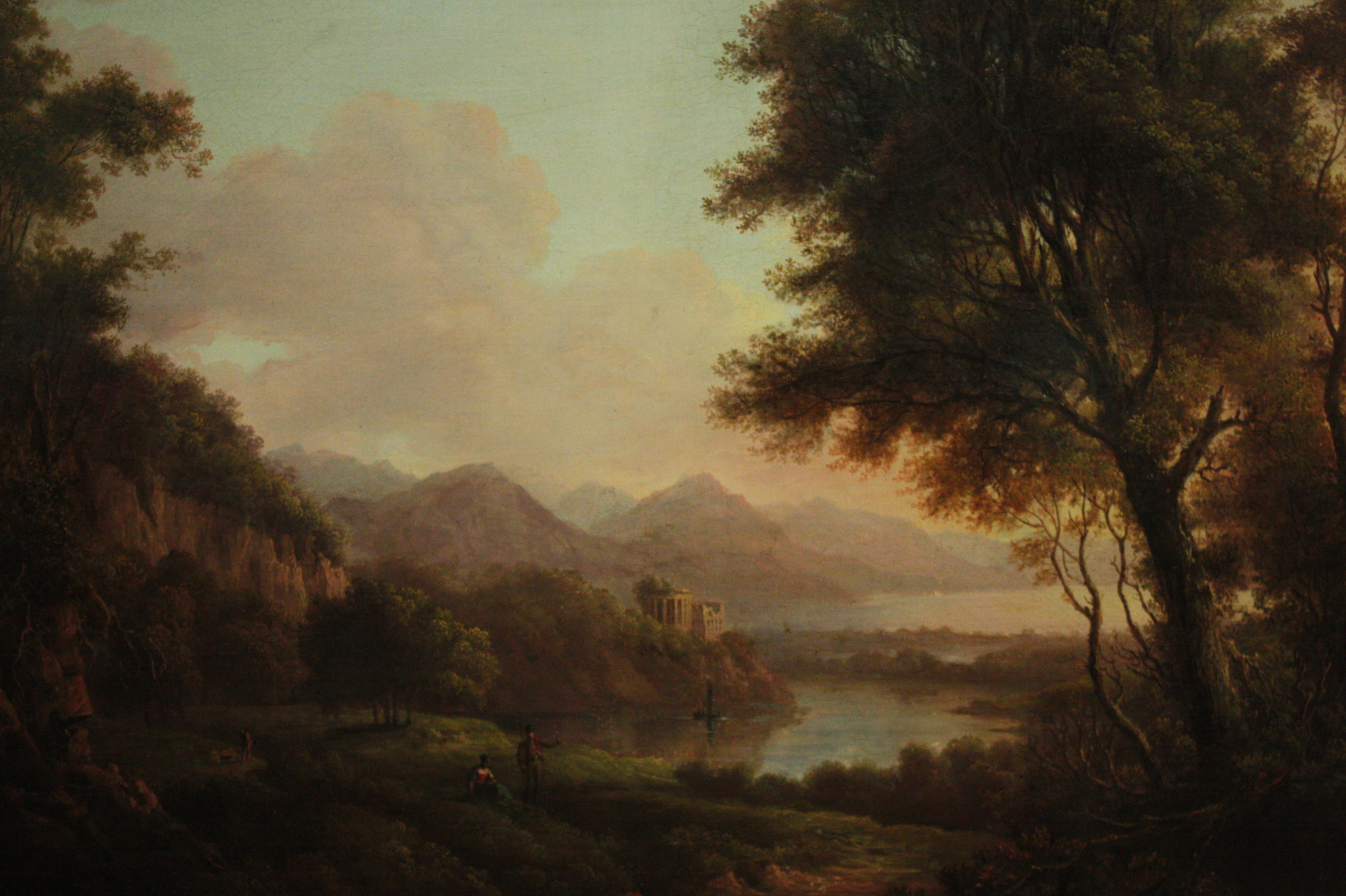
- Loch Katrine, setting of the march, by Alexander Nasmyth, 1810

Song
- Composer(s): William Rose

The Athole Highlanders Farewell to Loch Katrine is a popular Scottish bagpipe march in 2/4 time composed by William Rose. in the 1890s. It is in the key of A Mixolydian. James Scott Skinner called it "The King of Pipe Marches". It appears in the album The Strathspey King in two of the medleys, namely Bagpipe Marches and the Cradle Song medley. The music was recorded in Maybole, Ayrshire in 1963 by the School of Scottish Studies. It was included in a collection, Traditional Fiddle Music Of Cape Breton Volume 1: Mabou Coal Mines. It is in a historic recording from London made before July 1898, played on the bagpipes, possibly by the piper John MacKenzie Rogan or Henry Forsyth. It is also in a historic recording of traditional fiddle and accordion music from Canada.
