= Stob a' Choin =

Mountain in Stirling, Scotland

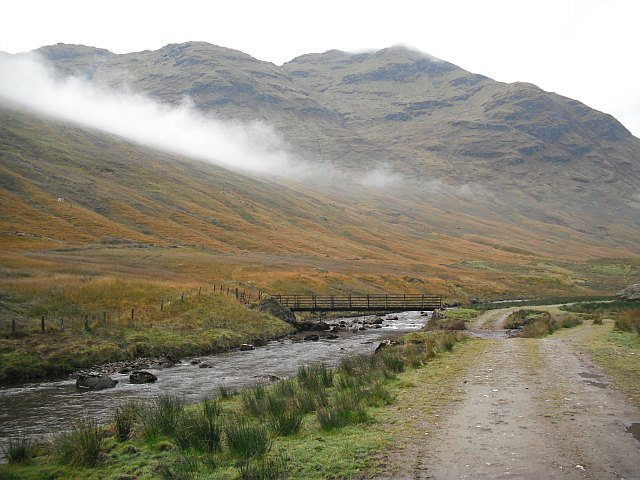
- Stob a'Choin from the River Larig

Highest point
- Elevation: 867.2 m (2,845 ft)
- Prominence: 478 m (1,568 ft)
- Listing: Corbett, Marilyn
- Coordinates: 56°18′37″N 4°33′40″W

Geography
- Location: Stirling, Scotland
- Parent range: Grampian Mountains
- OS grid: NN417159
- Topo map: OS Landranger 56

Stob a'Choin (867.2 m) is a mountain in the Grampian Mountains, Scotland, north of Loch Katrine in the Loch Lomond and The Trossachs National Park.

The nearest village is Balquhidder.
