= Trossachs =

Area in the southern Scottish Highlands

Coordinates: 56°13′52″N 4°25′30″W

The Trossachs: Scottish Gaelic: Na Tròiseachan
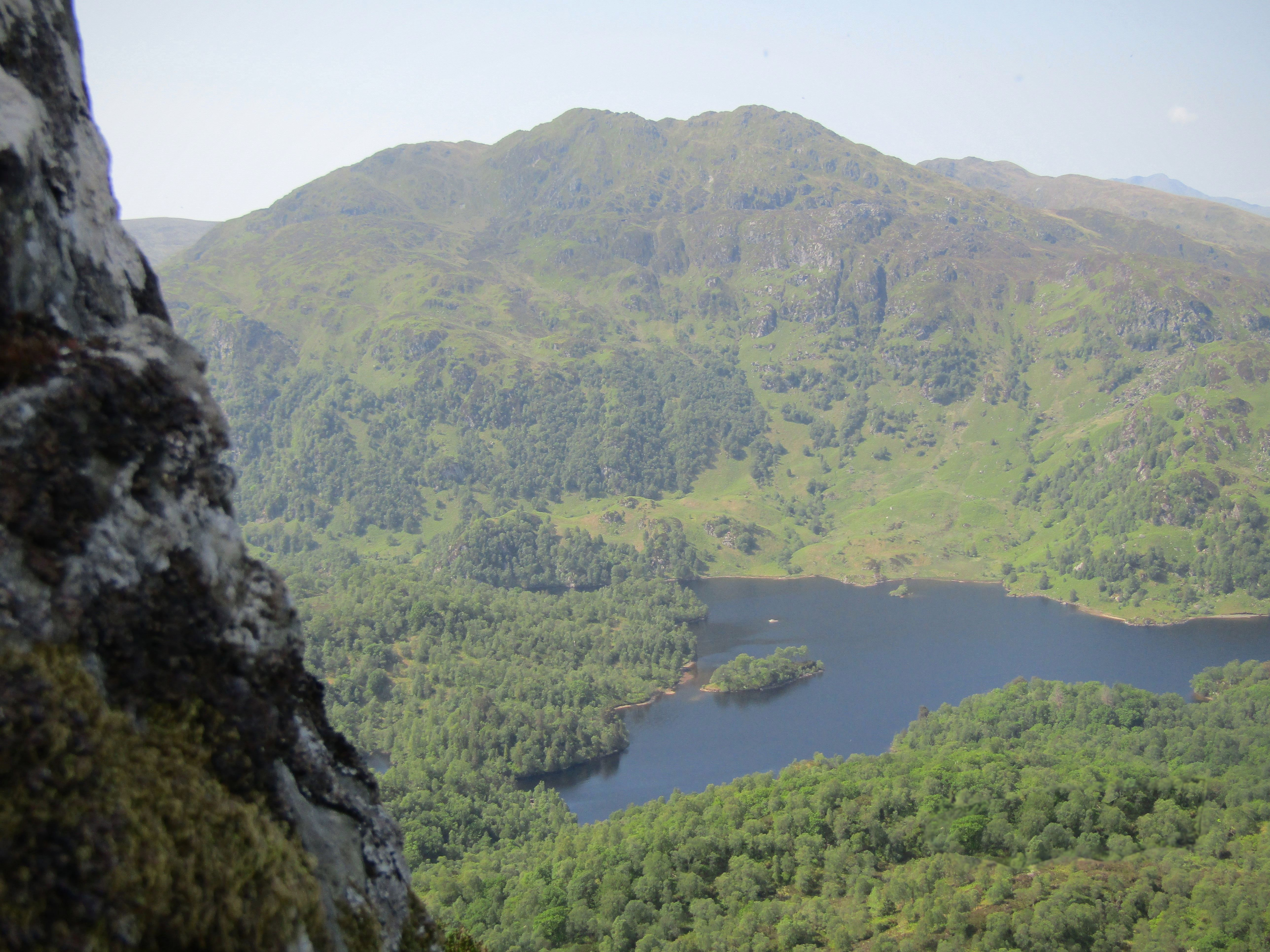
- The forested area at the eastern end of Loch Katrine

- Location within the Stirling council area
- OS grid reference: NN498068
- Council area: Stirling
- Country: Scotland
- Sovereign state: United Kingdom
- Police: Scotland
- Fire: Scottish
- Ambulance: Scottish

The Trossachs (Scottish Gaelic: Na Tròiseachan) generally refers to an area of wooded glens, braes, and lochs lying to the east of Ben Lomond in the Stirling council area of Scotland. The name is taken from that of a small woodland glen that lies at the centre of the area, but is now generally applied to the wider region.

The wooded hills and lochs of the area may be considered to represent a microcosm of a typical highland landscape, and the woodlands are an important habitat for many species. Much of the Trossachs area is protected by various different conservation designations, including the Great Trossachs Forest National Nature Reserve.

The Trossachs form part of the Loch Lomond and The Trossachs National Park, which was established in 2002. The area has long been visited by tourists due to the relative proximity of major population centres such as Glasgow and Stirling, and remains popular with walkers, cyclists and tourists. Scenic boat rides on Loch Katrine are popular with visitors: the steamer SS Sir Walter Scott, launched in 1899, remains in operation. The Great Trossachs Path, one of Scotland's Great Trails, is a 48 km route suitable for walkers, cyclists and horse riders. It runs between Callander in the east and Inversnaid on the banks of Loch Lomond in the west, passing along the northern shores of Loch Katrine and Loch Arklet.

== Name and etymology ==
The name Trossachs involves the Brittonic root trōs meaning "across" (cf. Welsh traws), perhaps conserving the compound trawsfynydd meaning "cross-hill".

Also suggested is a derivation from a Gaelic word for "bristly".

== Geography ==
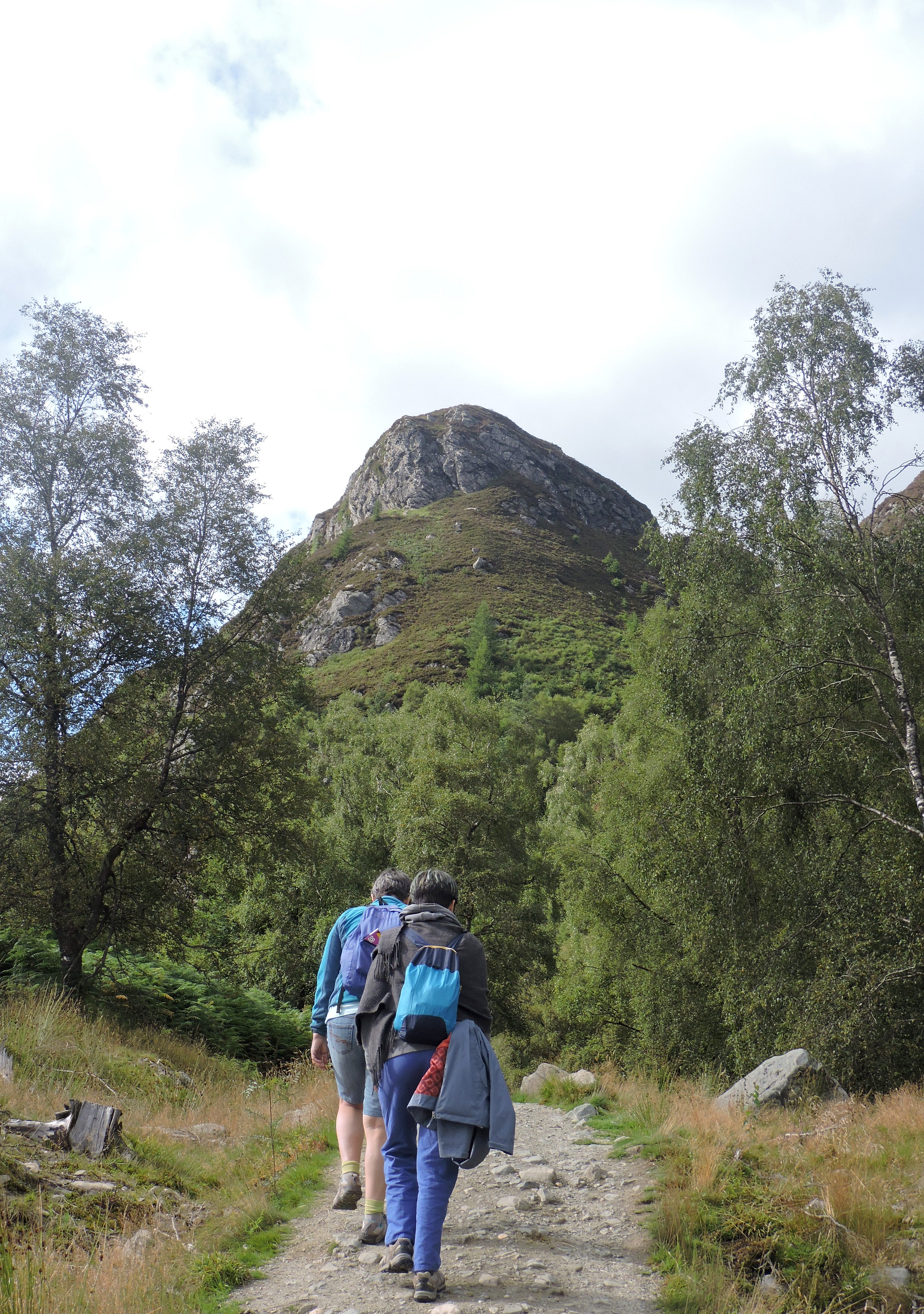
The hill of Ben A'an.

The Trossachs glen lies between Ben A'an to the north and Ben Venue to the south, with Loch Katrine to the west and Loch Achray to the east. It lies at the centre of the wider region, which is generally regarded as being bounded by Glen Gyle to the south, with the western boundary being the road between Stronachlachar and Aberfoyle. Loch Doine, Loch Voil, and Loch Lubnaig form the northern and eastern boundary of the area.

The A821 road between Aberfoyle and Callander runs through this glen, and is the main access route into the Trossachs from the south and east. The section between Aberfoyle and the Trossachs glen runs through the Achray Forest, reaching a height of 238 m above sea level at the summit of the Duke's Pass. The main route to Callander continues east via the north shores of Loch Achray and Loch Venachar, whilst a branch of the A821 heads west to finish at the western end of Loch Katrine. No public road continues along the shore of Loch Katrine, although the Great Trossachs Path allows walkers and cyclists to follow the northern shore round to Stronachlachar on the western shore. From here a minor road heads west to Loch Lomond. Stronachlachar can also be reached by the B829 road from Aberfoyle, which passes north of Loch Choin and Loch Ard.

The small town of Callander and the village of Aberfoyle lie at the edge of the Trossachs, however Brig o' Turk is the only settlement of any size within the Trossachs. The Lake of Menteith, situated near Aberfoyle, lies about six miles (10 km) to the south east of the glen, on the edge of the Trossachs area. The lake is a fishing destination that features the ruins of Inchmahome Priory on one of its islands, Inchmahome, where Mary, Queen of Scots was taken as a child before being taken to France for her protection.

== History ==
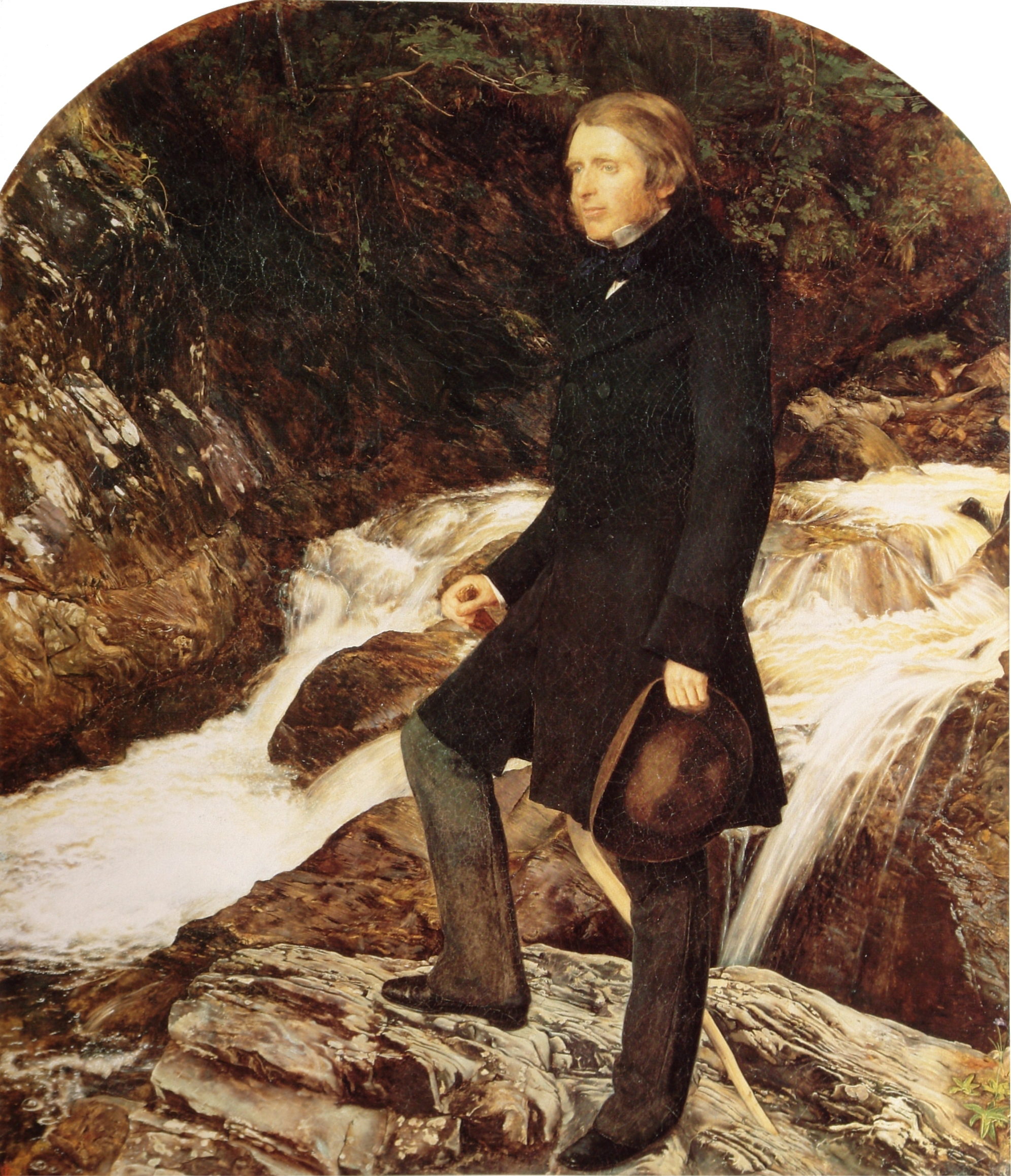
John Ruskin painted at Glenfinlas in the Trossachs by John Everett Millais in 1853–54.

There are several prehistoric sites in the area, including a cup and ring marked rock and burnt mounds in Glen Finglas. There are crannogs on Loch Ard and Loch Venachar, and an Iron Age hill fort at Dunmore.

The Trossachs were one of the first parts of Scotland to become a recognised tourist destination due to the area's position on the southern edge of the Scottish Highlands and the quality of the scenery, which may be considered to represent a microcosm of a typical highland landscape. The poet William Wordsworth and his sister Dorothy visited the area, with Dorothy publishing an account of their visit in Recollections of a Tour Made in Scotland in 1803.

The scenic charms of the area came to popularity with Sir Walter Scott's 1810 poem The Lady of the Lake, extending his romantic portrayal of Scotland's past from border ballads to poems of a medieval past rich in chivalry and symbolism. The poem gives a roll call of Trossachs place names, the lady herself being found on Loch Katrine. Scott followed up with his 1817 historical novel Rob Roy romanticising the outlaw cattle thief Raibert Ruadh, who was born by Loch Katrine and buried at nearby Balquhidder.

The leading Victorian art critic John Ruskin (1819–1900) and the Pre-Raphaelite painter John Everett Millais (1829–1896) spent the summer of 1853 together at Glenfinlas in the Trossachs. Millais started a painting of John Ruskin during the visit, which he finished the following year. The painting is held in a private collection, but was on show at an exhibition on the Pre-Raphaelites at Tate Britain in London during 2004. John Ruskin himself was especially interested in the rock formations in the area and undertook his own studies of these.

The Trossachs Hotel was built on the north bank of Loch Achray in response to the growing number of tourists visiting the region. The building now functions as the Tigh Mor Trossachs holiday apartments, owned by the Holiday Property Bond (HPB). In 1859, a dam was built at the eastern end of Loch Katrine and connecting aqueducts were added to as part of a new main water supply to Glasgow. At the expense of the Glasgow water company, Queen Victoria had a holiday house built overlooking the loch. The queen never stayed in the house, named Royal Cottage, as the windows were broken by the 21-gun salute that welcomed her, and the cottage later became accommodation for the employees of Scottish Water.

== Nature and conservation ==
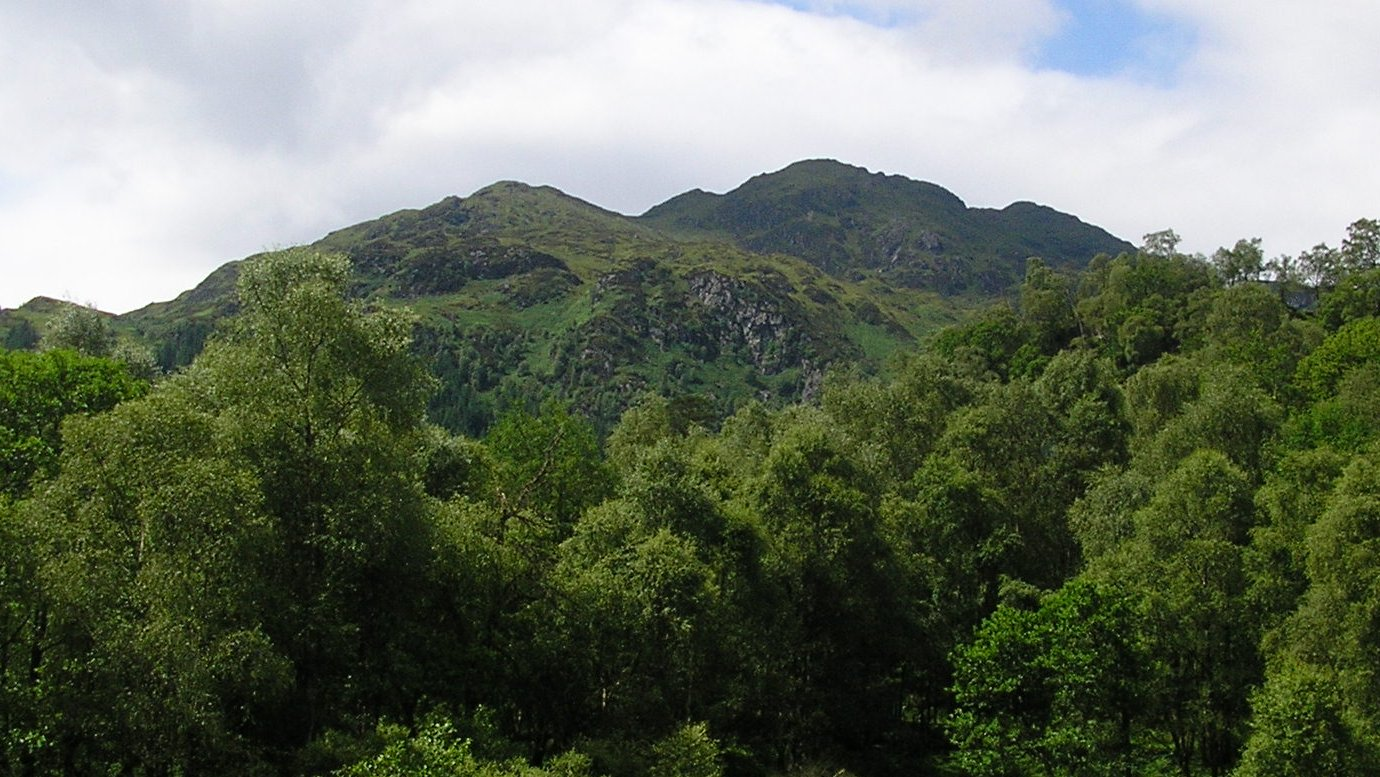
Ben Venue and Achray Forest in the southern park of the Great Trossachs Forest.

The forests of the Trossachs comprise both areas of ancient, semi-natural and traditionally managed woodland alongside commercial forestry plantations. The native woodland is largely deciduous, whilst the commercial forestry consists mostly of conifers.

Fauna found in the woods of the Trossachs include black grouse, western capercaillie and Eurasian goshawk; mammal species include red and roe deer, red squirrel and European pine marten. Eurasian beavers are also now present in the area, with signs of beaver activity being observed on Loch Achray during a survey undertaken over the winter of 2017–18; the beavers are assumed to have spread there from the existing population on the River Tay.

Species of fish found in the lochs of the Trossachs include brown trout, perch and pike, and the lochs are also a habitat for osprey and otter. Arctic char are known to have lived in Loch Venachar and Loch Achray, but as of 2006 it was believed that they were no longer present. The more farmed areas of the Trossachs provide areas of marshland that are habitat for wildfowl and waders, with both wintering and breeding species recorded. In 2011 the pearl-bordered fritillary butterfly - a species considered rare in Britain - was found to be living around Loch Katrine, the first time the species had been identified in the area for 25 years.

Much of the Trossachs area is protected via several different conservation designations.

=== Great Trossachs Forest National Nature Reserve ===
The Great Trossachs Forest is a project that aims to deliver a 165 km^{2} forest in the heart of the Trossachs in order to develop a wide range of habitats for invertebrates, mammals, birds and other wildlife. Since 2015 the area, which covers much of the core area of the Trossachs around Loch Katrine and Loch Arklet (including the Trossachs glen), has been classified as national nature reserve with the title Great Trossachs Forest National Nature Reserve. The reserve is considered to be a "forest in the making", and is managed jointly by Forestry and Land Scotland, RSPB Scotland and Woodland Trust Scotland. The reserve is classified as a Category II protected area by the International Union for Conservation of Nature. The project aims to deliver a varied landscape that provides habitats for species that are otherwise rare in Britain, including black grouse, golden eagle, osprey, European wildcat, European pine marten, red squirrel, European water vole and Eurasian otter.

=== Other conservation designations ===
A smaller area (378 ha) of the Trossachs is protected as a Special Area of Conservation due to importance of the existing native forest. The Trossachs are also defined as a national scenic area, being one of 40 such areas in Scotland, which are defined so as to identify areas of exceptional scenery and to ensure its protection from inappropriate development. Areas of forestry owned by Forestry and Land Scotland within the Trossachs form part of the Queen Elizabeth Forest Park, and the entire area lies within the Loch Lomond and The Trossachs National Park.

== Government and politics ==
The Trossachs area forms part of the council area of Stirling; at the most local level there is a Trossachs Community Council.

The area is part of the registration county of Perth, lying in the most westerly part of the county, close to the border with County of Stirling. The area is represented in the Scottish Parliament as part of the constituency of Stirling, which elects one Member of the Scottish Parliament (MSP) by the plurality (first past the post) method of election. The area also forms part of the Mid Scotland and Fife electoral region, which elects seven additional members, in addition to nine constituency MSPs, to produce a form of proportional representation for the region as a whole. At Westminster the Trossachs area is represented as part of a constituency also entitled Stirling, however this constituency, which elects one Member of Parliament (MP) by the first past the post system of election, has different boundaries from the Scottish Parliament constituency.

== Hills and lochs ==
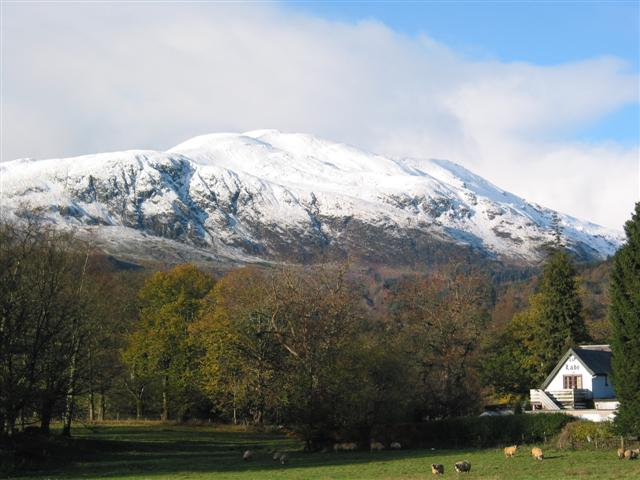
Ben Ledi seen from Kilmahog.

The chief hills of the Trossachs are:

- Ben Venue (729.5 m)
- Ben A'an (454 m)
- Ben Ledi (878.6 m)
- Benvane (821 m)
- Ceann na Baintighearna (770.9 m)
- Stob a' Choin (867.2 m)

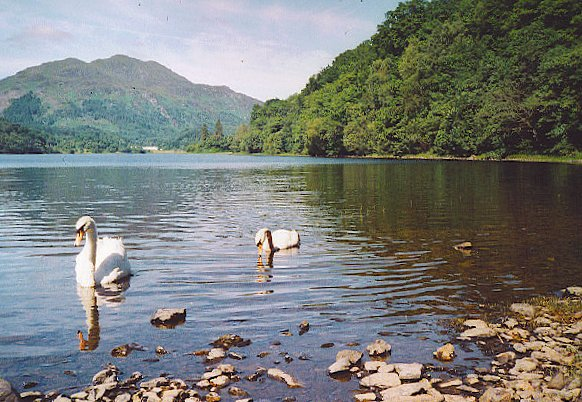
Loch Achray and Ben Venue.

The major lochs in the area are:

- Loch Katrine
- Loch Arklet
- Loch Achray
- Loch Venachar
- Loch Drunkie
- Loch Voil
- Loch Doine
- Loch Lubnaig
- Loch Chon
- Loch Dubh
- Loch Ard

Additionally, the Lake of Menteith may be regarded as lying on the boundaries of the district.

== Gallery ==
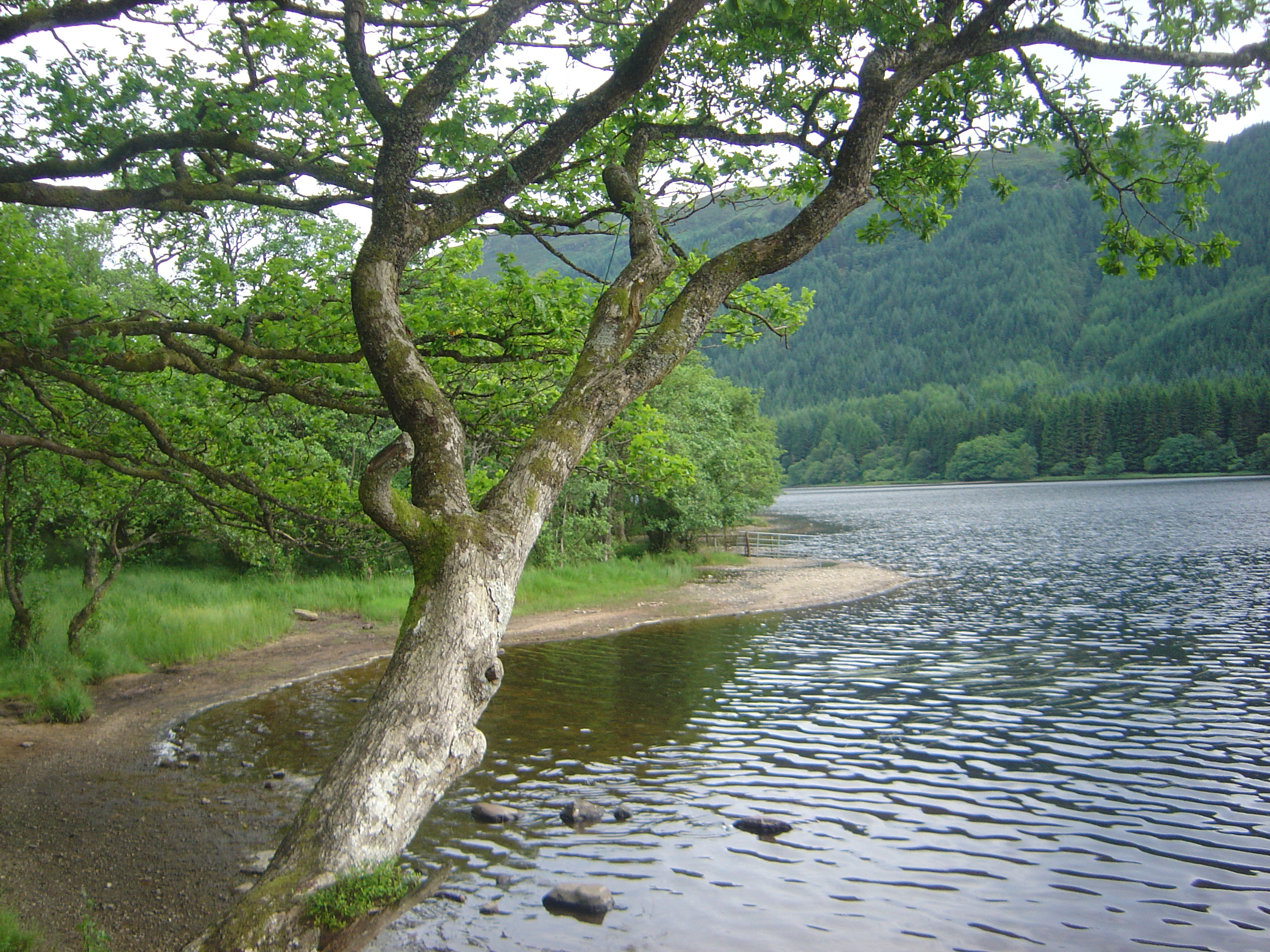
A loch in the Trossachs

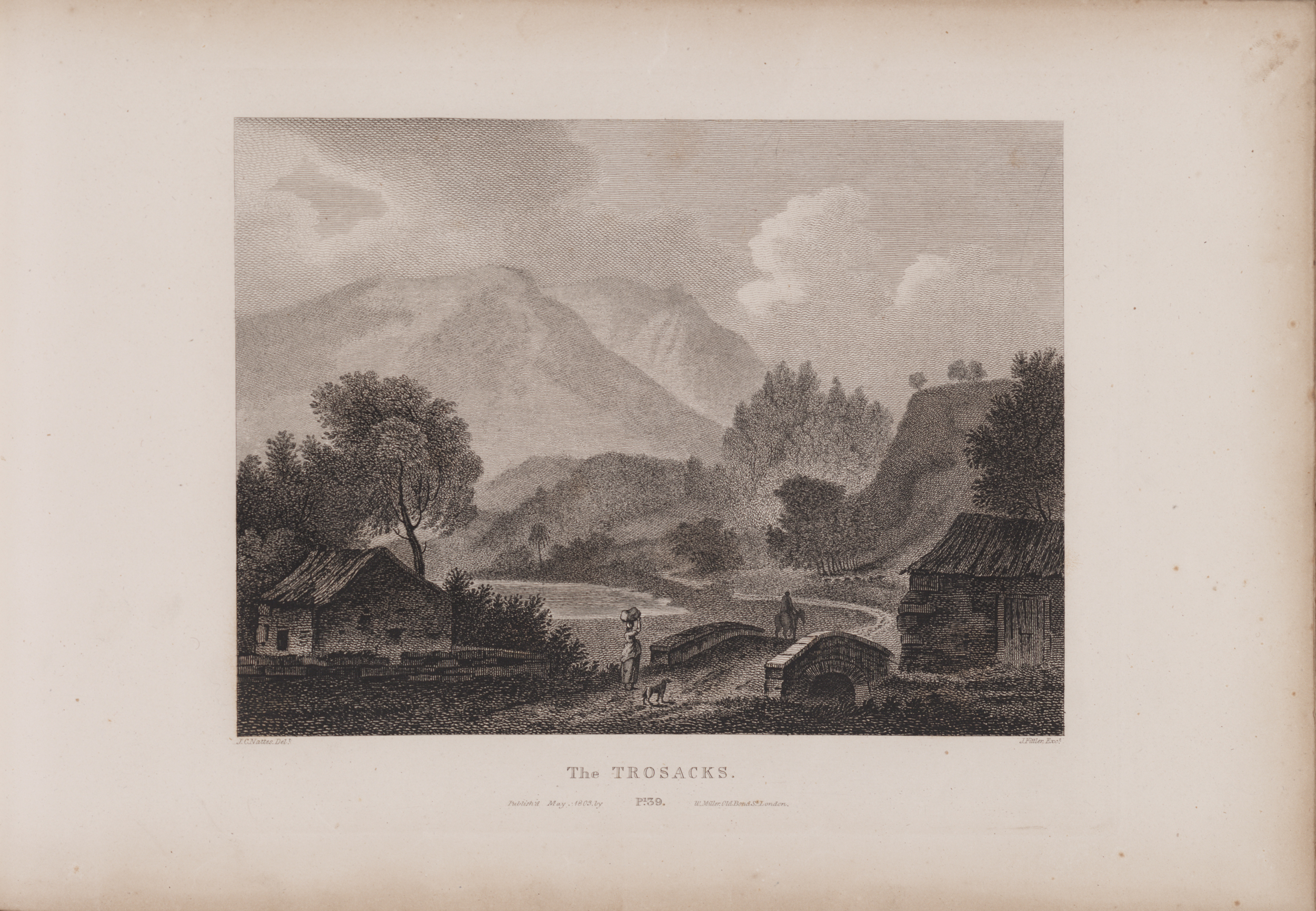
Engraving of a view of the Trossachs by James Fittler in Scotia Depicta, published 1804

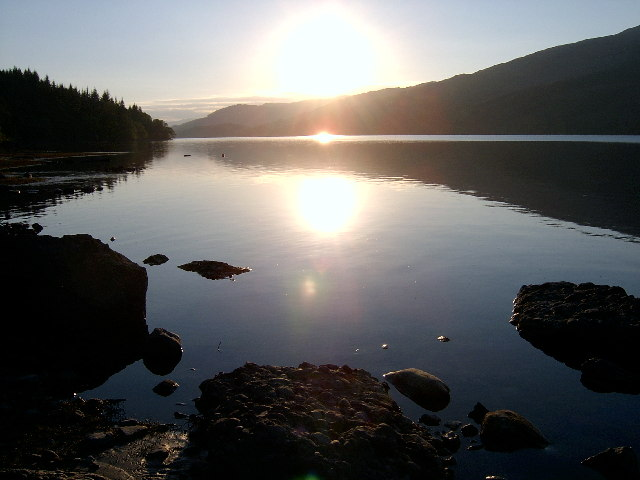
Early morning view of Loch Venachar
