= Loch Arklet =

Reservoir in Stirling, Scotland

Coordinates: 56°14′46″N 4°37′18″W

Loch Arklet is a freshwater loch and reservoir in the Trossachs area of the Scottish Highlands. It is within the historic county and registration county of Perthshire and the district of Stirling.

It is situated to the east of Loch Lomond, with which it is connected by the Arklet Water. The western end of Loch Arklet was dammed between 1910 and 1915, raising the water level to provide Glasgow with fresh drinking water.
