= Tree preservation order =

National planning order to protect trees

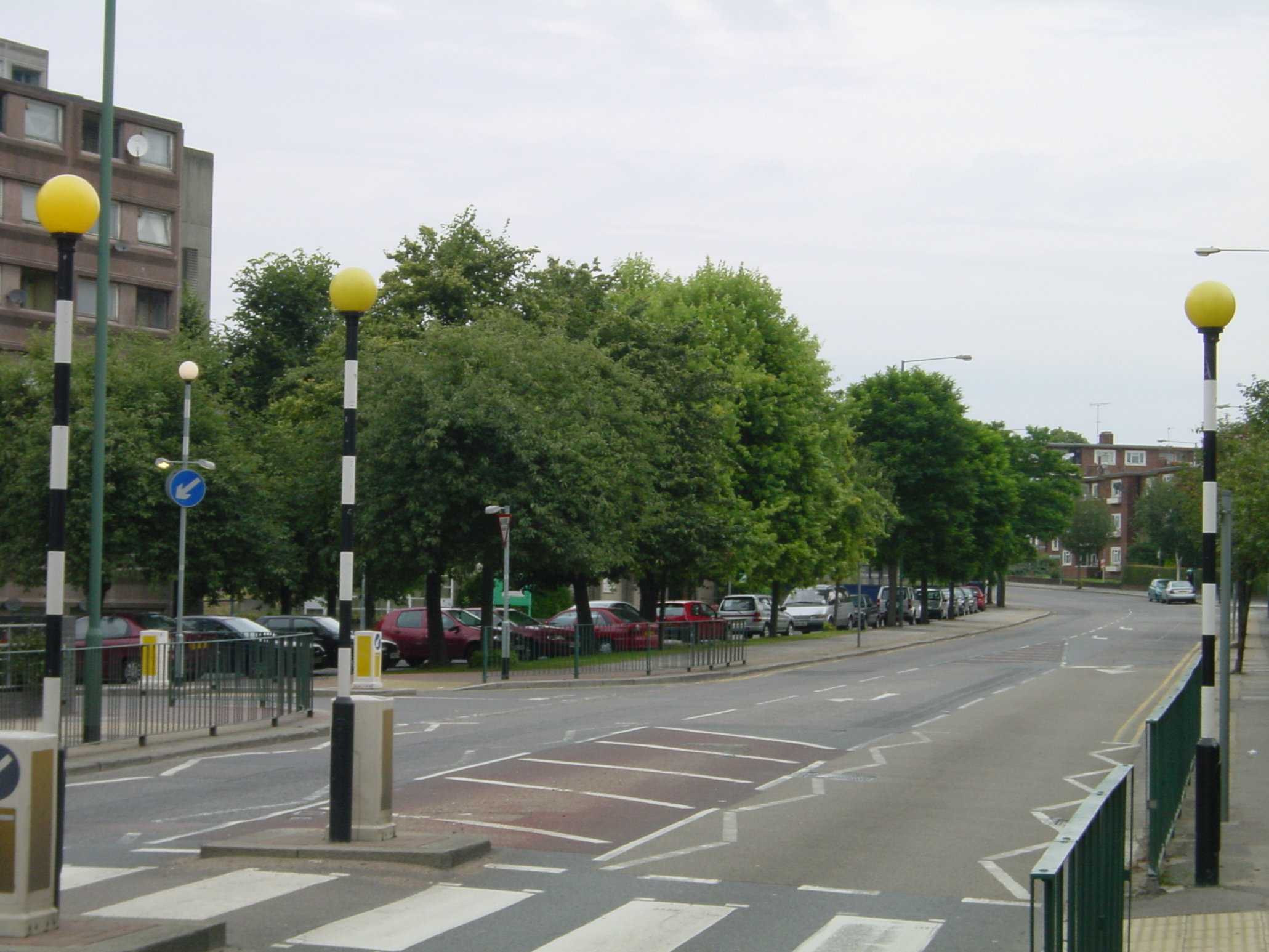
An example of a TPO: This line of trees on private land in Winchelsea Road, north London, was protected from imminent felling for development by action by the London Borough of Brent, after a local campaign by residents

A tree preservation order (TPO) is a part of town and country planning in the United Kingdom. A TPO is made by a local planning authority (usually a local council) to protect specific trees or a particular area, group or woodland from deliberate damage and destruction if those trees are important for the amenity of the area. In Scotland TPOs can also be used to protect trees of historic or cultural significance. TPOs make the felling, lopping, topping, uprooting or otherwise willful damaging of trees without the permission of the local planning authority a legal offence, although different TPOs have different degrees of protection.

They can be made very quickly and in practice it is normal for a council to make an emergency TPO in less than a day in cases of immediate danger to trees.

== Legal basis ==
TPOs were originally introduced in the Town and Country Planning Act 1947 and the Town and Country Planning (Scotland) Act 1947. Some TPOs therefore may be over 70 years old, and still valid. Current tree preservation orders in England and Wales are made under the Town and Country Planning Act 1990 and the Town and Country Planning (Tree Preservation) (England) Regulations 2012.

In Scotland, similar provision is made under the Town and Country Planning (Scotland) Act 1997 (amended by the Planning etc. (Scotland) Act 2006) and the Town and Country Planning (Tree Preservation Order and Trees in Conservation Areas (Scotland) Regulations 2010. Near equivalent legislation in Northern Ireland is the Planning Act (Northern Ireland) 2011. At 2019 the Welsh assembly is proposing separate Welsh legislation.

== Exemptions ==
The following works normally do not require permission under any TPO:

1. Works approved by the Forestry Commission under a felling licence or other approved scheme.
2. Felling or working on a dead or dangerous tree. The onus is on the person who authorises the work to prove that the tree was dead or dangerous — this can cause problems if the tree is felled and removed, as then there is no proof of its condition. Normally this requirement is fulfilled by obtaining a report by a qualified person made before the works are done.
3. Where there is an obligation under an Act of Parliament (for example, to maintain a public highway).
4. Works at the request of certain agencies or organisations which are specified in the order.
5. Works where there is a direct need to work on the tree to allow development for which detailed planning permission has been obtained.
6. Works to fruit trees cultivated in the course of a business for fruit production, as long as the tree work is in the interests of that business. This means that fruit trees are not automatically exempt unless they are actively being used for a business.
7. Works to prevent or remove (abate) a nuisance (in the legal sense only).

== See also ==
- Town and country planning in the United Kingdom

== Sources ==
- Naturenet
