= Loch Katrine =

Loch Katrine Loch Ceiteirein
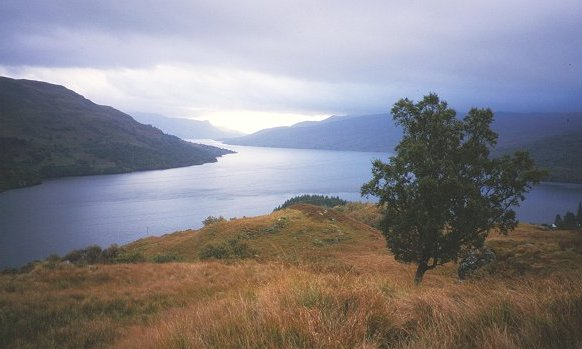
- Above Stronachlachar, looking eastward along the length of the loch

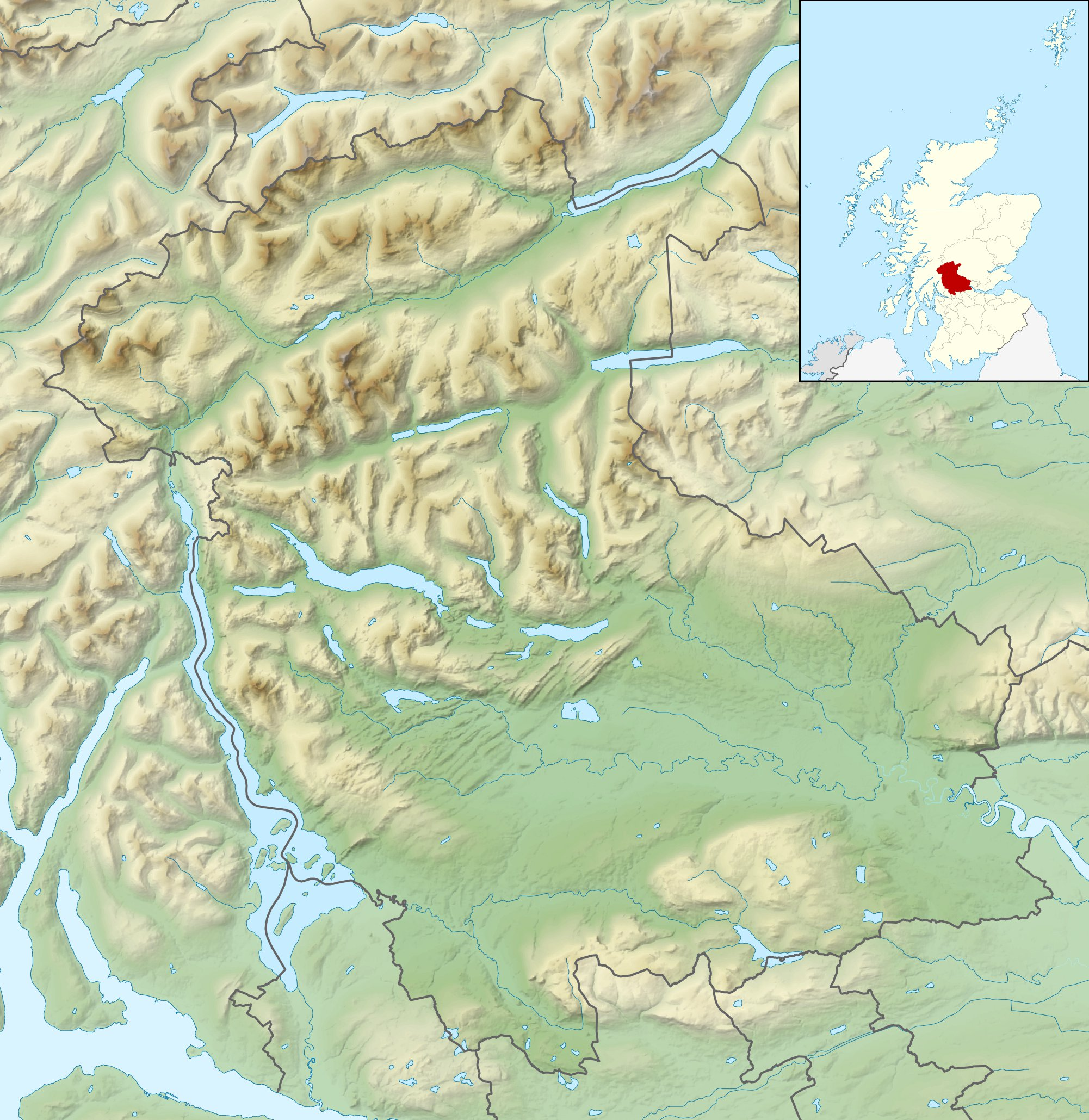
- Location within Stirling
- Location: Stirling area, Scotland
- Coordinates: 56°15′16″N 4°30′56″W
- Type: freshwater loch, reservoir
- Primary outflows: Achray Water and Katrine aqueduct
- Basin countries: Scotland
- Max. length: 13 km (8.1 mi)
- Max. width: 1 km (0.62 mi)
- Islands: Ellen's Isle, Black Isle, Factor's Isle or Island

Loch Katrine (Scottish Gaelic: Loch Ceiteirein [l̪ˠɔx ˈkʲʰeʰtʲɪɾʲɛɲ] or Loch Ceathairne) is a freshwater loch in the Trossachs area of the Scottish Highlands, east of Loch Lomond within the Stirling council area. It mostly lies within the historic and registration county of Perthshire, with Glengyle Water and the northern part of the loch's mid-line forming part of the boundary with historic Stirlingshire. The loch is about 8 miles (13 km) long and 1 mile (1.6 km) wide at its widest point, and runs the length of Strath Gartney (Gaelic: Srath Ghartain). It is within the drainage basins of the River Teith and River Forth.

It is a popular scenic attraction for tourists and day-visitors from Glasgow and nearby towns; fly and boat fishing for trout are permitted on the loch from spring to autumn. It also serves as a reservoir for the water supply of the Glasgow conurbation, some 30 miles (48 km) south, being connected by two aqueducts constructed in 1859.

It is the fictional setting of Sir Walter Scott's poem The Lady of the Lake and of the subsequent opera by Gioachino Rossini, La donna del lago.

== Toponym ==
William Watson, a renowned scholar of Scottish place names, judged Katrine to be "thoroughly Pictish" in origin, and to derive from an extension of the Celtic root *ceit, meaning "dark, gloomy place", a name referring to the loch's heavily forested shores.

The name Katrine has also been hypothesized to represent cateran, from the Gaelic ceathairne, a collective word meaning cattle thief or possibly peasantry.

== Physical geography ==
1910 Bathymetric chart of Loch Katrine

Loch Katrine is a serpentine lake oriented WNW–ESE, about 8 miles (13 km) long, with a maximum width of almost exactly 1 mile (1.6 km) between the mouths of the Letter Burn and the Strone Burn on the northern shore to a small bay on the opposite shore. The mean breadth, obtained by dividing the area of the loch by its length, is 0.6 miles (0.97 km), 7.5% of the length.

The loch covers an area of 3,059 acres (1,238 ha), and drains a mountainous area, some eight times greater, of about 24,900 acres (10,100 ha). It contains an estimated 27,274,000,000 cubic feet (772,300,000 m^{3}) of water with a mean depth of 99 feet (30 m), being over 40% of the maximum observed depth of 495 feet (151 m).

The surface of the loch is 364 feet (111 m) above sea-level, so some 645 acres (261 ha) of its bottom lies below sea-level, the deepest part being 131 feet (40 m) below sea-level. In this respect Loch Katrine differs from the other lakes in the Forth Basin, none of which have any portion of their bottoms below sea level.

Loch Katrine forms a single basin, not being divided, like Loch Lomond and Loch Lubnaig, for instance, into separate basins by any important ridges or rises on the bottom. The deepest part is in the centre of the loch, a long narrow depression, with depths exceeding 400 feet (120 m), extending for over 4 miles (6.4 km) from opposite Coilachra to opposite Huinn Dubh-aird, with a maximum width of over one-quarter of a mile (0.40 km); this 400-feet depression has an area of about 515 acres (208 ha), or 17% of the entire superficial area of the loch. The deepest sounding is situated at the very eastern extremity of the 400-feet depression.

The 300 feet (91 m) depression is over 5 miles (8 km) long, with a maximum breadth of one-third of a mile (0.54 km); it extends from off Coilachra to near Ellen's Isle. The area enclosed between the 300-feet and 400-feet contour lines is about 415 acres (168 ha), or 13% of the entire area of the loch.

The 200 feet (61 m) depression is five and a half miles (8.9 km) in length and one-half a mile (0.80 km) in maximum breadth, extending from south of Ellen's Isle to near Black Island, where it is separated (by a sounding of 198 feet (60 m)) from a small isolated area, lying between Coilachra and Black Island, one-third of a mile (0.54 km) in length by nearly one-eighth of a mile (0.20 km) broad. The area between the 200- and 300-feet contours is about 510 acres (210 ha), or 17% of the area of the loch.

There are two 100 feet (30 m) depressions, the principal one (6 miles (10 km) long) stretching from close to Ellen's Isle to Black Island, the other extending from Black Island towards the point called Rudha nam Moine, with a total length of over one-half a mile (0.80 km). The area between the 100- and 200-feet contours is about 670 acres (270 ha), or 22% of the area of the loch.

The 50 feet (15 m)-feet line follows pretty closely the contour of the loch, from Rudha nam Moine into the eastern arms of the loch at the Trossachs, running outside of Black island, Ellen's isle, and the small islands near the shore all round, with a small isolated patch at the junction of the Trossachs arm with the arm leading to Achray Water; it encloses a small shallow, with a beacon on it, opposite the entrance of the Glasahoile. The area between the 50- and 100-feet contours is about 400 acres (160 ha), or 13% of the area of the loch, while the area between the coast-line and the 50-feet contour is nearly 550 acres (220 ha), or 18% of the loch area; so that 82% of the floor of the loch is covered by over 50 feet (15 m) of water.

=== Geology ===
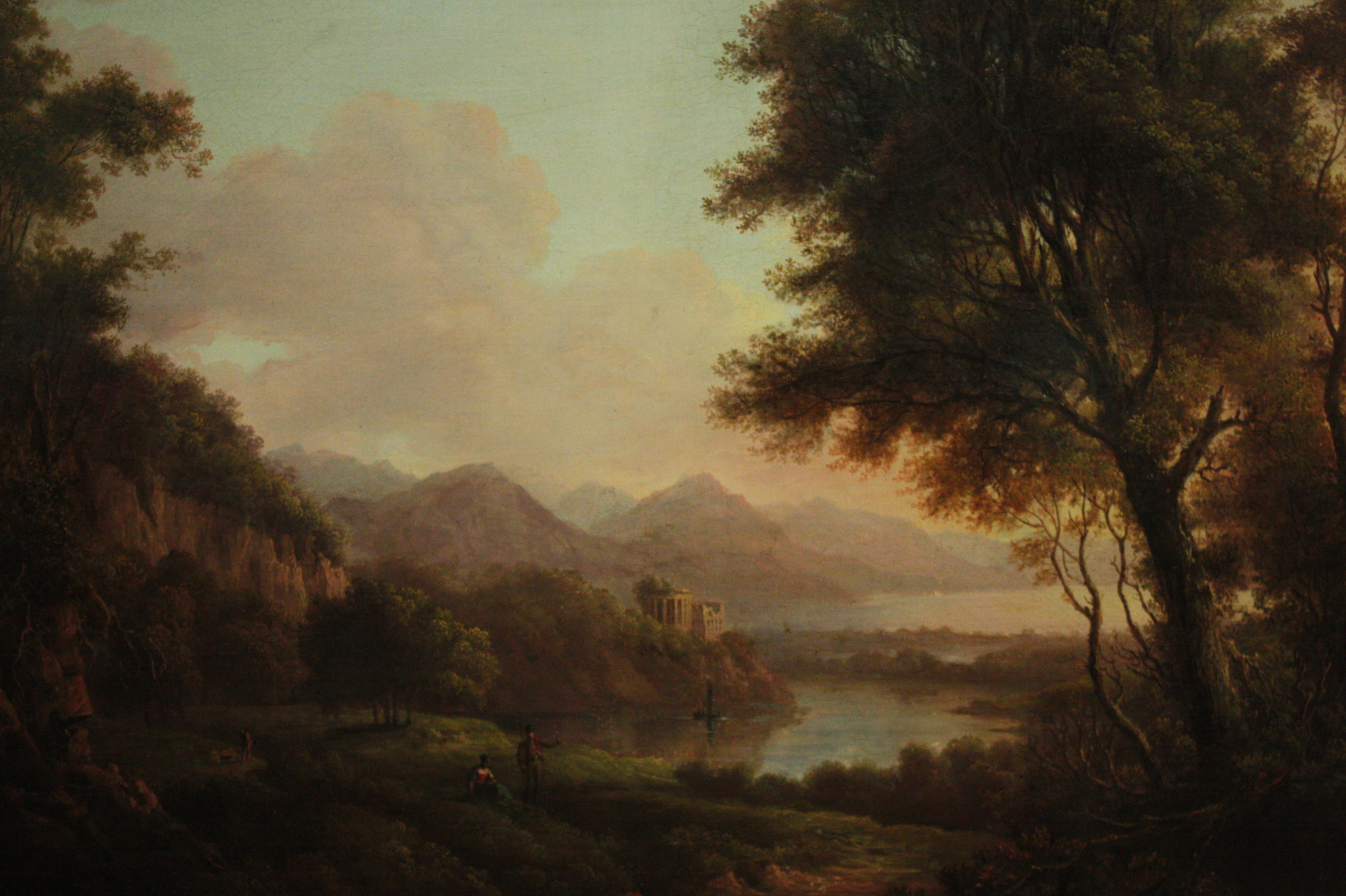
Loch Katrine by Alexander Nasmyth, 1810

For four miles (six kilometres) west from Brenachoil Lodge to Stronachlachar — about the half of the total length of the loch – Loch Katrine has a comparatively flat bottom, enclosed by the 400-foot (120-metre) contour line. The deepest sounding in Loch Katrine,495 feet (151 metres), is at the eastern limit of this basin, nearly due south of Brenachoil. Bathymetric charts show that the soundings throughout this basin gradually increase in depth eastwards to Brenachoil Lodge. The position of the deepest sounding is of interest, seeing that the strata which form the floor of the lake at this point consist of schistose micaceous grits, to the north-west of the epidotic grits ("Green Beds") and Ben Ledi grits, the two latter groups having formed the great rocky barrier at and above the outlet of the lake.

Near the upper end of the loch a rocky barrier crosses the lake from Portnellan by the Black Island to Budha Maoil Mhir an-t Salainn. The deepest sounding along this barrier is 90 feet (27 m), and the shallowest is 48 feet (15 m). On its lower side the 100 feet (30 m) contour line almost crosses the lake. Above it there is another basin over 1/2 mile (800 m) in length, the greatest depth of which is 128 feet (39 m), immediately in front of the rocky ridge just referred to. Westwards the lake shallows, and at its head it has been silted up for a distance of 1/2 mile (800 m) by alluvium laid down by Glengyle Water.

Below Brenachoil Lodge the soundings show an uneven floor, due probably to ridges of rock rather than to morainic deposits, judged from the geological features on both sides of the lake. Ellen's Isle is composed of epidotic grits ("Green Beds"), and the promontories of Am Priosan partly of "Green Beds" and partly of Ben Ledi grits. The promontory between the pier and the sluice is formed of Ben Ledi grits.

Several small faults cross Loch Katrine, but these are of minor importance, and have produced locally a slight brecciation of the strata. It is a typical example of a rock basin. The deepest sounding occurs in the front of the great rocky barrier in the lower part of the lake, in accordance with a theory of glacial erosion.

=== Settlements ===
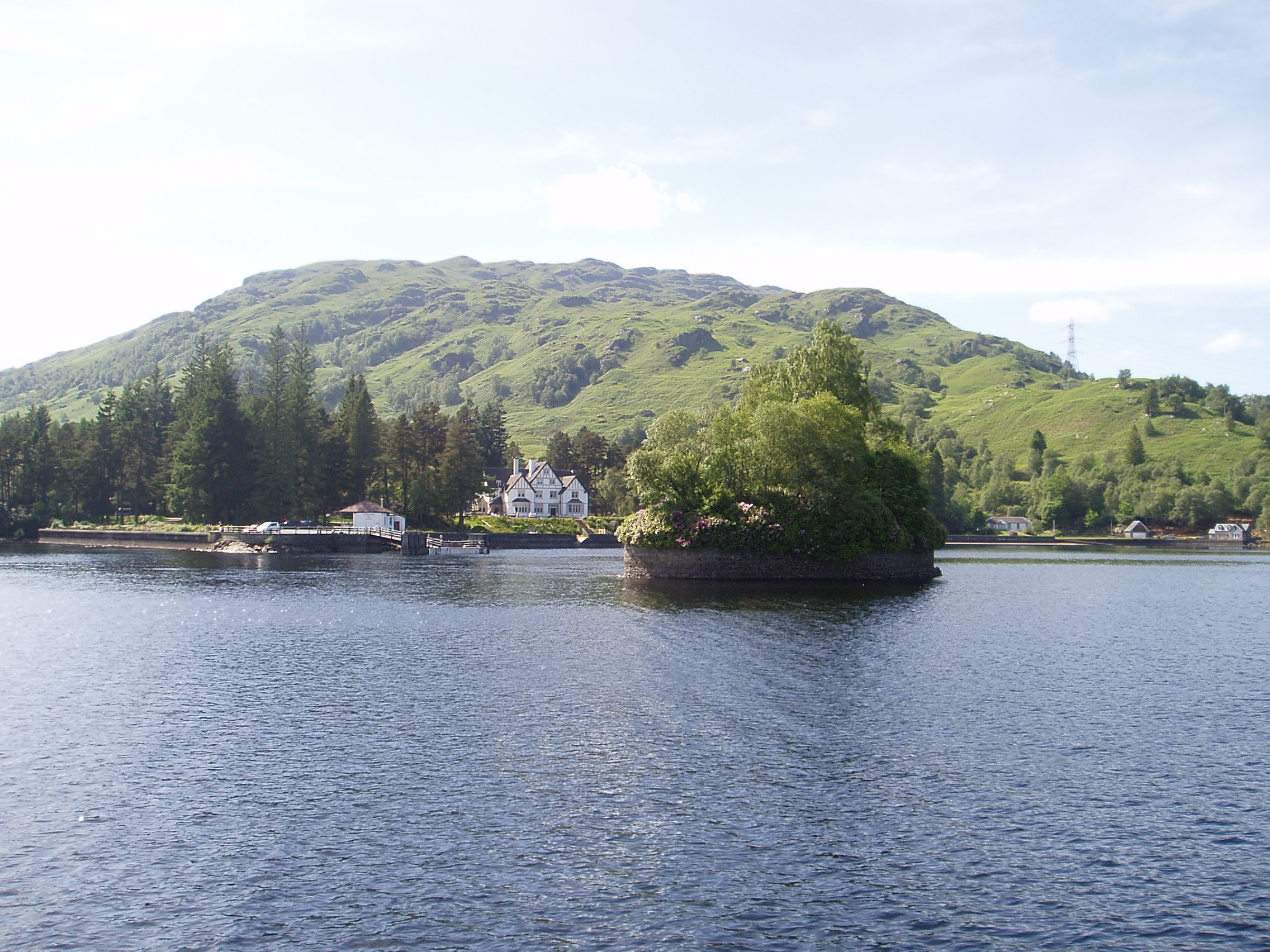
Stronachlachar from Loch Katrine with Factor's Isle in the foreground.

The main access points for Loch Katrine are either via Trossachs Pier at the loch's eastern end or Stronachlachar (Gaelic Sròn a' Chlachair "the headland of the stonemason") towards the western end of the loch. Trossachs Pier essentially consists of a parking space, pier, gift shop and cafe (Katrine Cafe) which are open from the first to the last sailing of the cruise boats (normally 6pm).

On the northern shore are the Brenchoile hunting lodge and the farms Letter (Gaelic: Leitir), Edra (Gaelic: Eatarra "between them"), Strone (Gaelic: An t-Sròn "the nose"), Coilachra, Portnellan (Gaelic: Port an Eilein "port of the island") and Glengyle (Gaelic: Gleann Goill "glen of a lowlander"); on the southern are The Dhu (Gaelic: An Dubh "the black") at the western end of the loch, Stronachlachar, the Royal Cottage, Culligart and Glasahoile (Gaelic: Glas-choille "greywood"). The roads and paths do not circle the loch completely, as the southern road stops at Glasahoile.

=== Islands ===
There are several small islands in Loch Katrine such as Ellen's Isle (Gaelic: An t-Eilean Molach "the shingly isle"), the Black Isle and Factor's Island (Gaelic: Eilean a' Bhàillidh).

== History ==
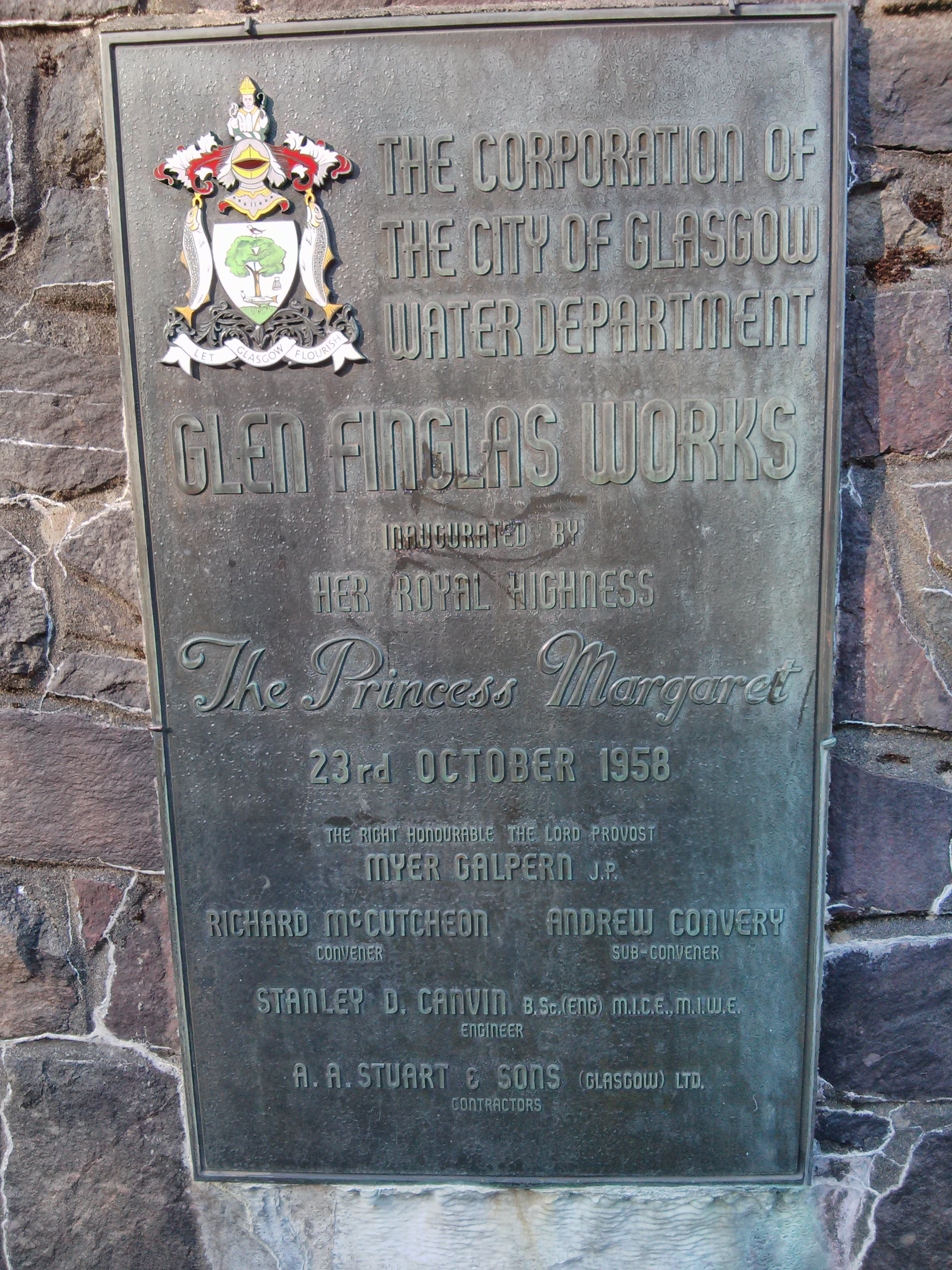
Plaque commemorating the Glen Finglas expansion of Loch Katrine waterworks, completed in 1958

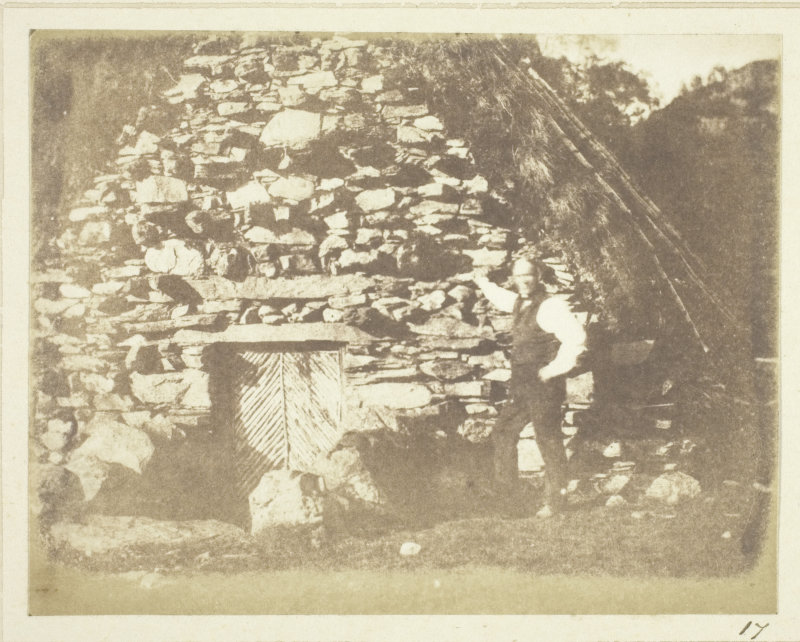
Scenery of Loch Katrine in 1844 by Henry Fox Talbot

In 1671, Rob Roy MacGregor was born at the head of the loch.

Loch Katrine is now owned by Scottish Water, and has been the primary water reservoir for much of the city of Glasgow and its surrounding areas since 1859. The water level has been artificially raised by around 1.8 metres (6 ft) – the loch can be drawn down by a maximum of two metres (6 1/2 ft). The water drawn down provides gravitational flow, using the Katrine aqueduct, to the Milngavie water treatment works via two 41-kilometre-long (25 mi) aqueducts and 21 kilometres (13 mi) of tunnel. Old photos showing the building of the aqueducts were discovered in a skip in Possilpark in 2018.

The treatment works in Milngavie are almost 100 metres (330 ft) above sea level: sufficient to provide adequate water pressure to the majority of the town without the need for pumping. The system can deliver up to 230,000,000 litres (51,000,000 imp gal) a day. Construction was started in 1855 and the works was opened by Queen Victoria in 1859. The aqueduct was built under the guidance of the eminent civil engineer John Frederick Bateman (1810–1889). The second aqueduct was opened in 1901.

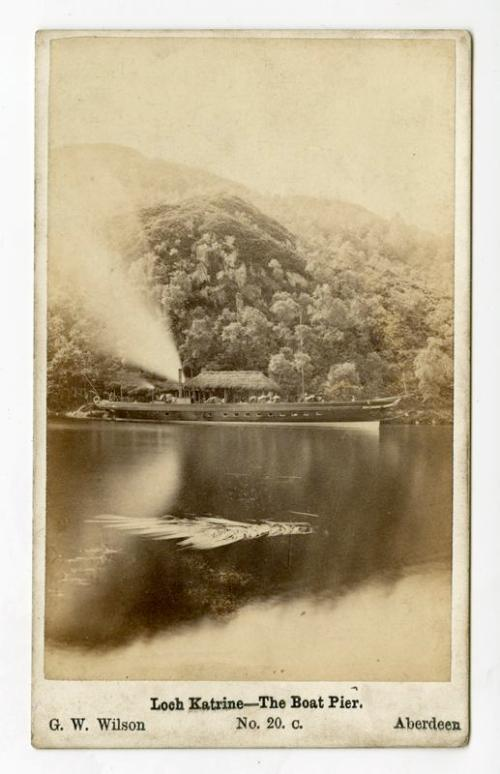
The Boat Pier, ca. 1870, photographed by George Washington Wilson

Water levels are supplemented via a dam and short tunnel from Loch Arklet, a reservoir between Loch Katrine and Loch Lomond, beside the road to Inversnaid; this project was completed in 1914. A longer tunnel beneath Ben A'an bringing water from the Glen Finglas Reservoir was completed in 1958, and the dam was completed in 1965.

Oil-fired vessels are not permitted to sail on Loch Katrine because of the danger of pollution to the drinking water of Glasgow. The steamboat SS Sir Walter Scott has provided sailings on the loch since 1900. It was coal-fired until 2007, when it was converted to use bio-diesel fuel, and continues to provide local tourist transport between Trossachs Pier and Stronachlachar during the summer.

The loch is the subject of The Athole Highlanders' Farewell to Loch Katrine.

== See also ==
- List of dams and reservoirs in the United Kingdom
