= Loch Achray =

Loch in Stirlingshire, Scotland

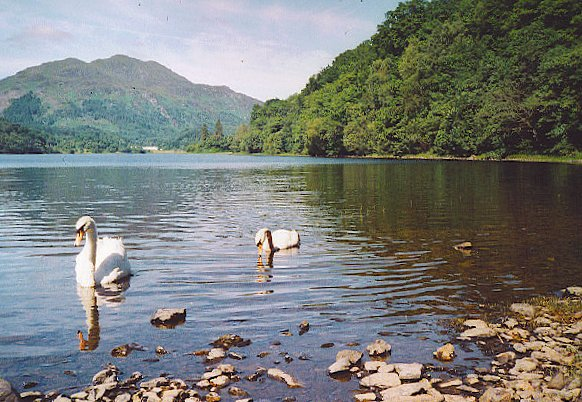
- looking west to Ben Venue

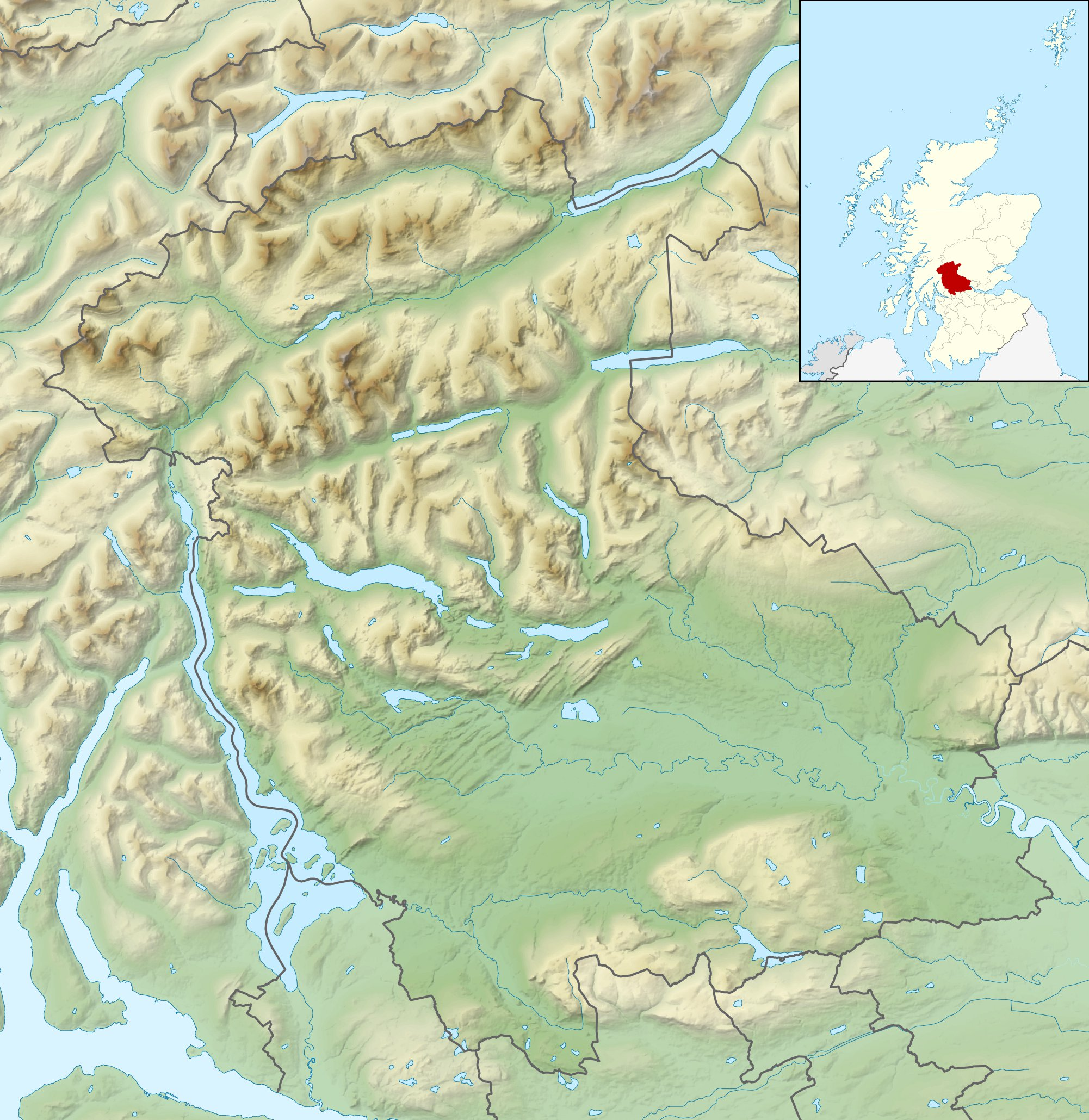
- Location within Stirling
- Location: Stirling, Scotland
- Coordinates: 56.2267°N 4.3950°W
- Primary outflows: Black Water
- Basin countries: United Kingdom
- Max. length: 2.4 km (1.5 miles)
- Surface area: 82 ha (200 acres)
- Average depth: 11 m (36 ft)

Loch Achray is a small freshwater loch 11 km (6.8 mi) west of Callander in Stirling district, Scotland.

The loch lies between Loch Katrine and Loch Venachar in the heart of the Trossachs and has an average depth of 11 metres (36 ft).

== History ==
Loch Achray was for a time the home of James "Beag" Stewart (c1410-1470) of Baldorran, the son of James Mor Stewart (known as "James the Fat"), who fled into exile in Ireland when his father Murdoch Stewart, Duke of Albany was executed for treason by James I of Scotland in 1425. James the Fat would never return to Scotland, and he was unable to inherit the Albany estates, but James "Beag" Stewart was able to secure a royal pardon and return to Scotland. He is the ancestor of the Stewarts of Ardvorlich on Lochearnside, whose family history is recounted by Sir Walter Scott in A Legend of Montrose.

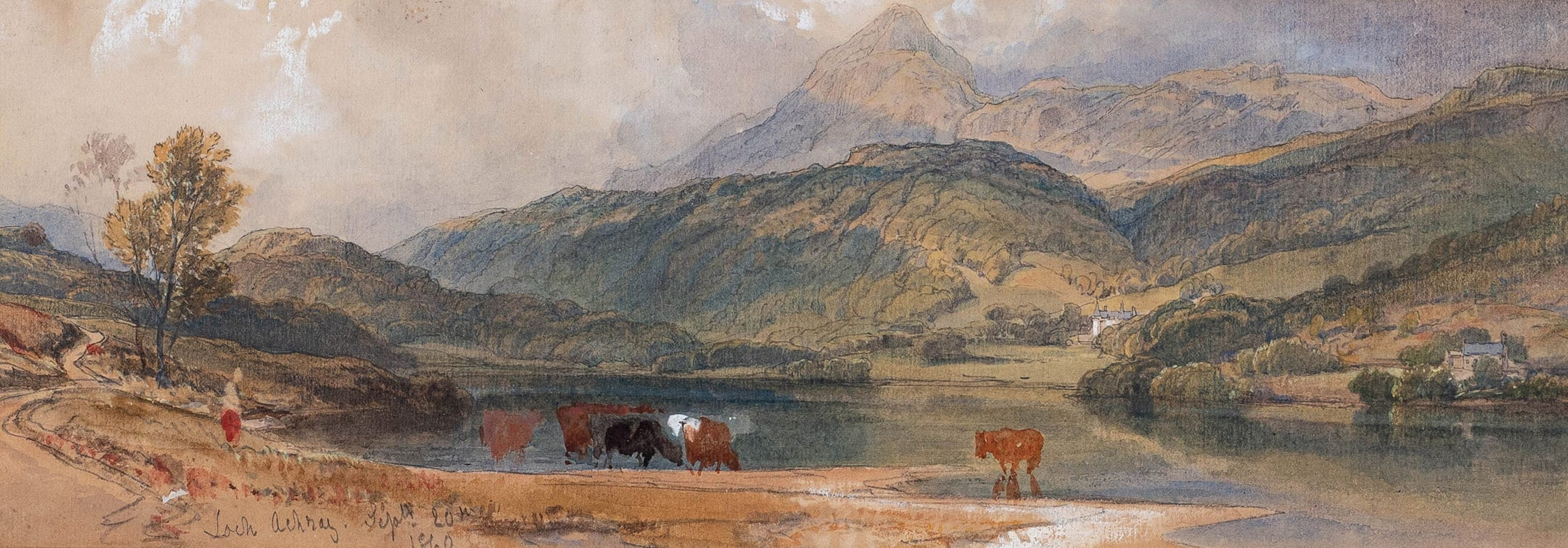
Loch Achray (1860) by William Leighton Leitch

Stewart had a small hunting lodge on the small island at the west end of Loch Achray, "to which he resorted on any sudden emergency as a place of safety". Alexander Campbell, writing in 1812, tells the following story:

It happened that a party of Argyleshire Campbells made an excursion to the King's forests of Glenartney and Glensinglais, whereof he [Stewart] was the keeper, and killed a great many of the deer and roebucks, without so much as asking the permission of Little James. The Argyleshire hunters, weary with the chase, and returning in quest of some habitation...met little James nearly opposite the small island on which his hut was situated, and inquiring of him what Magpie had built his nest on that island, he answered, 'One that hath scorned all manner of greedy hawks, from whatever quarter they might chance to come'. 'Tell the magpie from us (said the hunters) that we are no less disposed to hawk than to hunt around his nest; and tell him further, that we shall soon be on this way again, and mean to visit the nest of this vain chatterer: perhaps our hawks may not impress him with a mean opinion of their skill and dexterity in seizing their prey. Little James, somewhat nettled at the threatened visitation, peevishly replied; 'it may happen, likewise, that this chattering magpie, by the time your hawks have arrived within sight of his nest, by a singular power which he has over the hawks of these wooded mountains and glens, having called them in council, they may be prevailed on to suffer no strange hawks to infringe on their liberties, at least to within the range that they and their ancestors have for a length of time been accustomed.' So saying, they parted. In due time the Campbells kept their word; and Little James, having gathered his people from the various glens over which his influence extended, gave the meeting to the Argyleshire party in so warm a manner, that few returned to give an account of the hawking match for which they so merrily departed.

== Leisure ==
The south side of the loch is wooded and well served by woodland tracks and forest roads. The loch is popular with anglers who fish for brown trout. Loch Achray is well known for its sheltered location, giving rise to placid waters offering magnificent reflections of the woodland to the south, the mountains and forests to the north and the majestic crags of Ben Venue to the west. There is a campsite on the south side run by Loch Lomond and the Trossachs National Park.

== See also ==
- Stewart of Balquhidder
