= Queen Elizabeth Forest Park =

Forest park in the Scottish Highlands

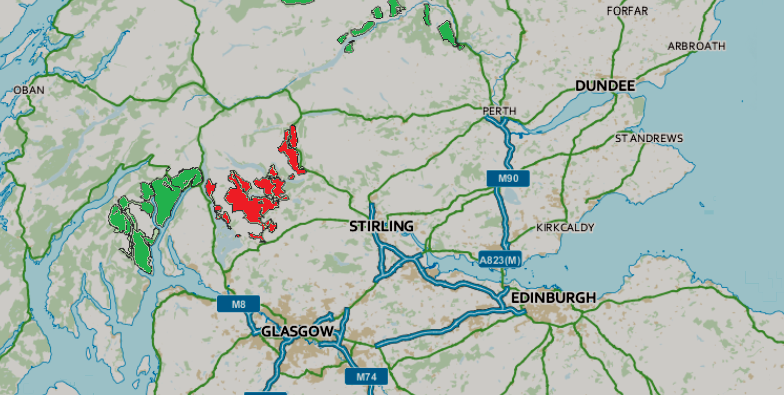
- A map showing the location of the Queen Elizabeth Forest Park (in red) in central Scotland, alongside the location of other forest parks (in green)

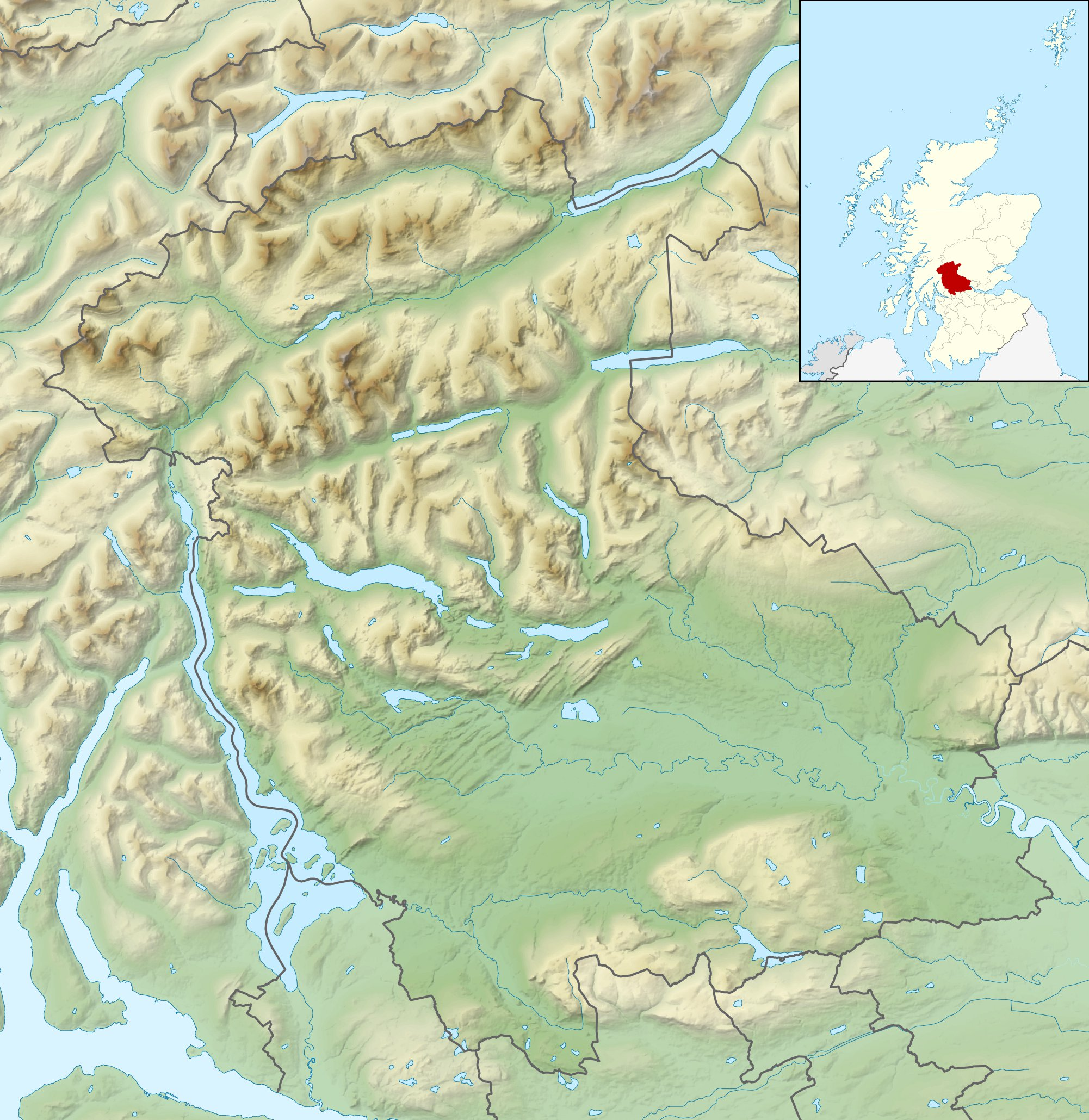
- Location within Stirling Location within Scotland
- Interactive map of Queen Elizabeth Forest Park

Geography
- Location: Highlands, Scotland
- Coordinates: 56.17°N 4.45°W

Queen Elizabeth Forest Park is a 19,665-hectare (48,590-acre) forest park in the Scottish Highlands which extends from the eastern shores of Loch Lomond to the mountains of Strathyre. The forest park is one of six such parks in Scotland, and was established in 1953, the year of the coronation of Queen Elizabeth II. It is owned and managed by Forestry and Land Scotland.

== Geography ==
The park is part of Loch Lomond and The Trossachs National Park and is a sparsely populated region of mountains, hills, lochs and valleys. Most of the upland areas are bare and uncultivated, while much of the lowland is densely forested.

Within the park are several mountains including Ben Lomond, which at 974 m (3,196 ft) is the highest point, Ben Venue (727 m; 2,385 ft) and Ben Ledi (879 m; 2,884 ft). Its lakes and reservoirs include Loch Ard, Loch Chon, Loch Venachar, Loch Arklet, Loch Katrine, Loch Achray and Loch Drunkie. Its forests include Achray Forest, Buchanan Forest, Strathyre Forest and Loch Ard Forest.

== Tourism ==
The main visitor centre for the area is The Lodge Forest Visitor Centre at Aberfoyle on the edge of the highlands on the eastern hillside of Craigmore (354 m; 1,161 ft). There are marked hiking trails and a car trail, the Three Lochs Forest Drive.

== Gallery ==
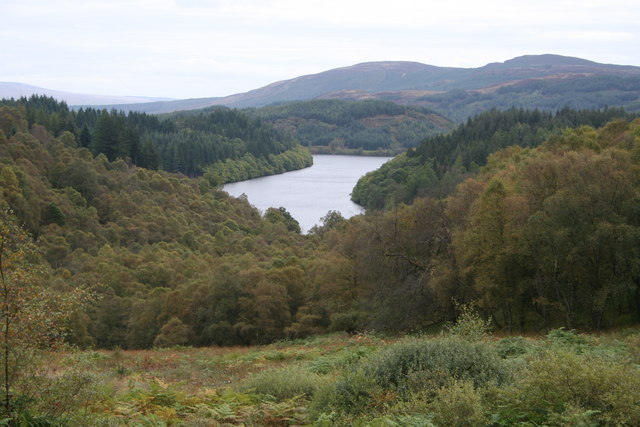
Loch Drunkie in the Achray Forest, seen from the Duke's Pass
