= Duchray Water =

River in Stirling, Scotland

Coordinates: 56°10′52″N 4°24′30″W

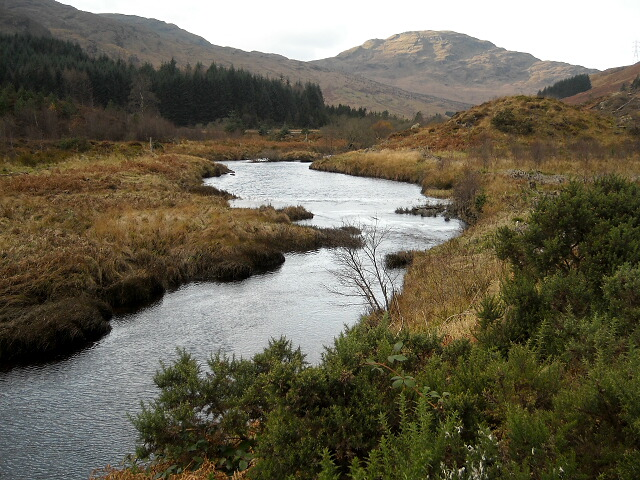
Duchray Water just downstream of Loch Dubh

Duchray Water (Scottish Gaelic: Abhainn an Dubhchra), also called Dachray Water, is a 14-mile-long (23 km) headstream of the River Forth in the Trossachs region of Scotland.

== Location ==
Duchray Water is a "spate burn" that rises in the Queen Elizabeth Forest Park to the west of Loch Ard and east of Loch Lomond. The mountain stream lies entirely within the Stirling council area. It merges with the outflow of Loch Ard to form the Forth, one mile west of the village of Aberfoyle.

== Waterfall ==
It is known for the waterfall Black Linn of Blairvaich, which has an 8-metre (26 ft) drop.
