= Loch Dubh (Loch Ard Forest) =

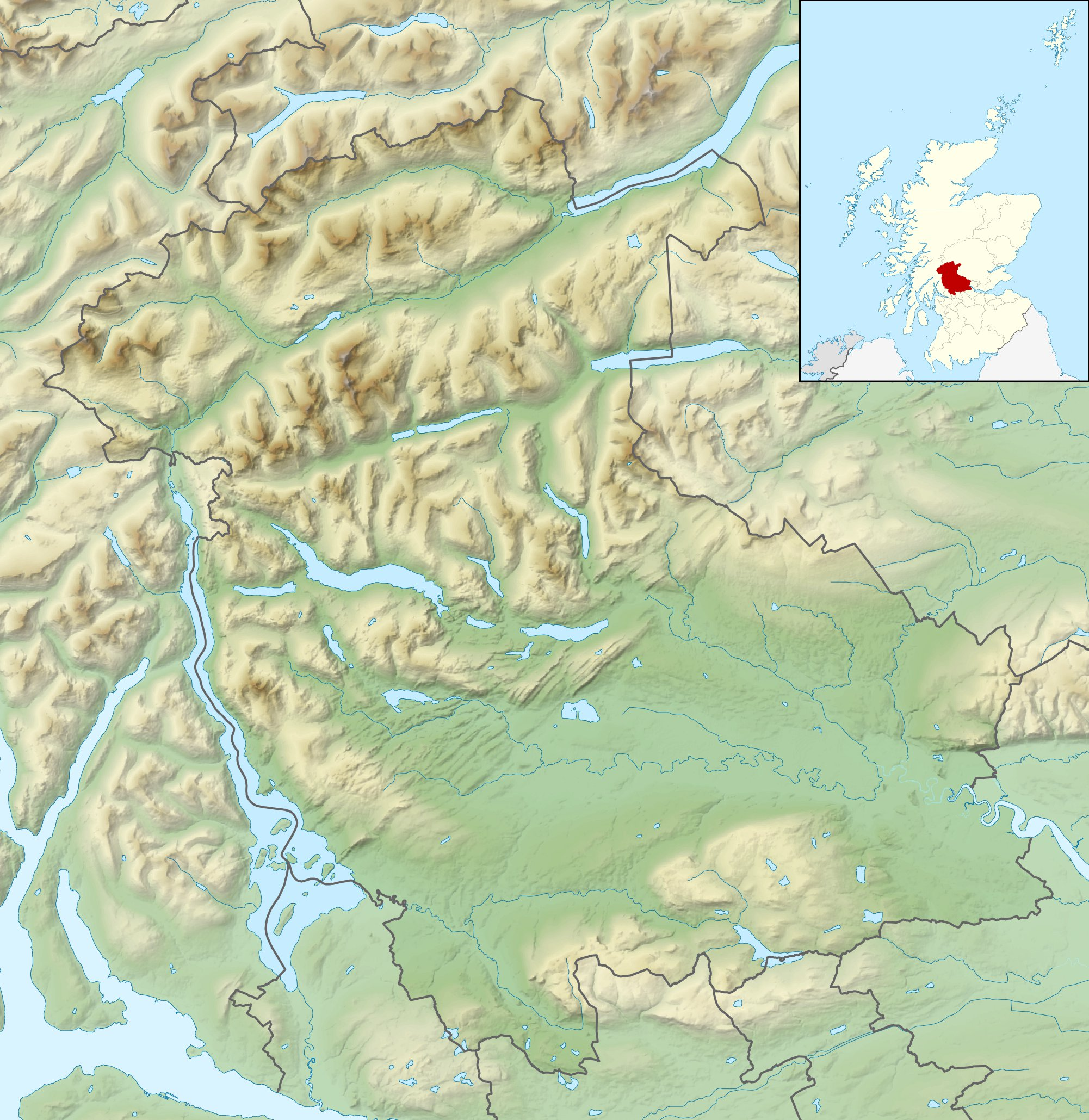
- Location within Stirling
- Location: Loch Ard Forest, Scotland
- Coordinates: 56.19372°N 4.57125°W
- Type: lochan
- Etymology: "Black Loch"
- Primary inflows: Duchray Water
- Primary outflows: Duchray Water
- Basin countries: United Kingdom
- Max. length: 402 metres (1,319 ft)
- Max. width: 267.15 metres (876.5 ft)
- Surface area: 4.8 ha (12 acres)
- Average depth: 21 ft (6.4 m)
- Max. depth: 41 ft (12 m)
- Shore length^{1}: 1.1 km (0.68 mi)
- Surface elevation: 141 m (463 ft)
- ^{1} Shore length is not a well-defined measure.

Loch Dubh ("Black Loch") is a lochan on the Duchray Water in the western part of Loch Ard Forest in the Central Highlands of Scotland.

== Location ==
Loch Dubh nestles in a wooded valley called Gleann Dubh at a height of about 140 metres above sea level. It is 4 kilometres east of Scotland's most popular Munro, Ben Lomond (974 m), one kilometre south of Beinn Dubh (508 m), 1½ kilometres northeast of Beinn Bahn (569 m) and five kilometres west northwest of Kinlochard near the head of Loch Ard.
