= Loch Drunkie =

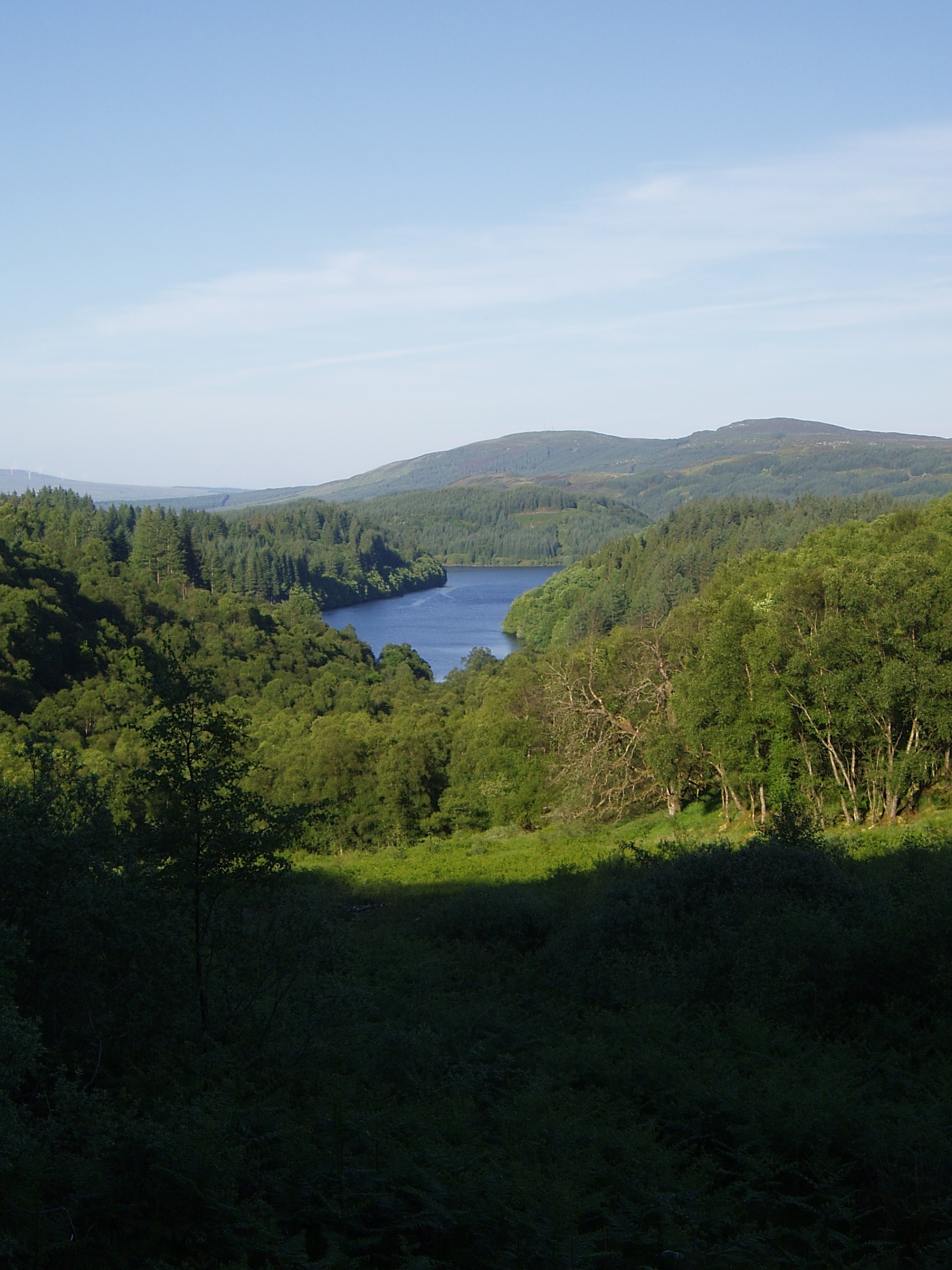
- from Duke's Pass

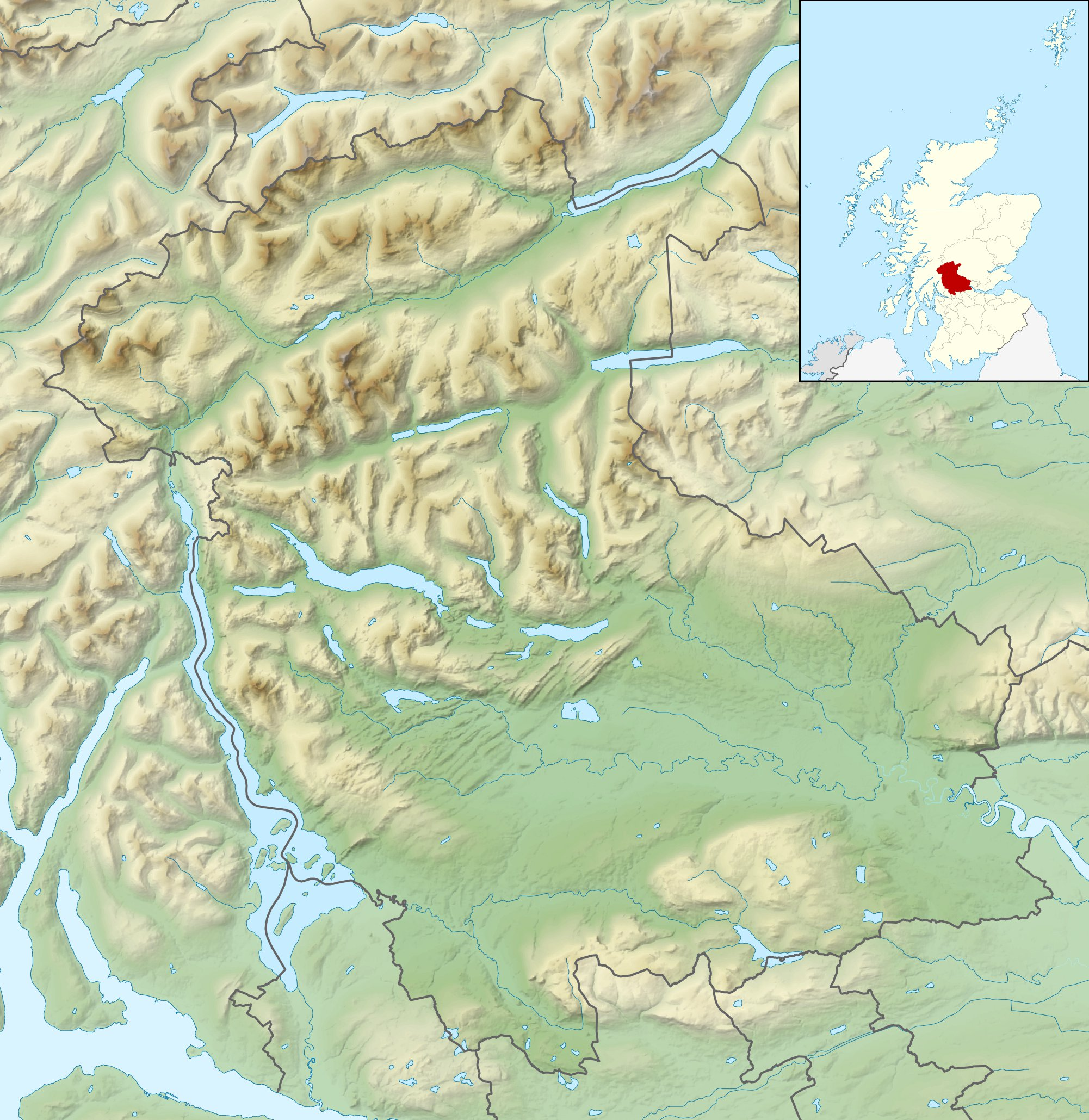
- Location within Stirling
- Location: Stirling
- Coordinates: 56.209°N 4.3514°W
- Type: freshwater loch
- River sources: Drunkie Burn
- Max. length: 1.6 km (0.99 mi)
- Max. width: 0.40 km (0.25 mi)
- Surface area: 55.8 ha (138 acres)
- Average depth: 38.5 ft (11.7 m)
- Max. depth: 97 ft (30 m)
- Shore length^{1}: 6.3 km (3.9 mi)
- Surface elevation: 126.7 m (416 ft)
- ^{1} Shore length is not a well-defined measure.

Loch Drunkie (Scottish Gaelic: Loch Drongaidh, pronounced [l̪ˠɔx ˈt̪ɾɔŋkɪ]) is a small freshwater loch in the Trossachs near Aberfoyle in the Stirling council area, Scotland.

== Geography ==
This picturesque and irregular Highland loch is shut on all sides by high hills.

== Fishing ==
Since the 19th century, the loch has been well-known for containing a good stock of pike and brown trout. The fishing season lasts now from mid-March to the beginning of October.
