= Loch Ard =

- Loch na h-Àirde (Scottish Gaelic)
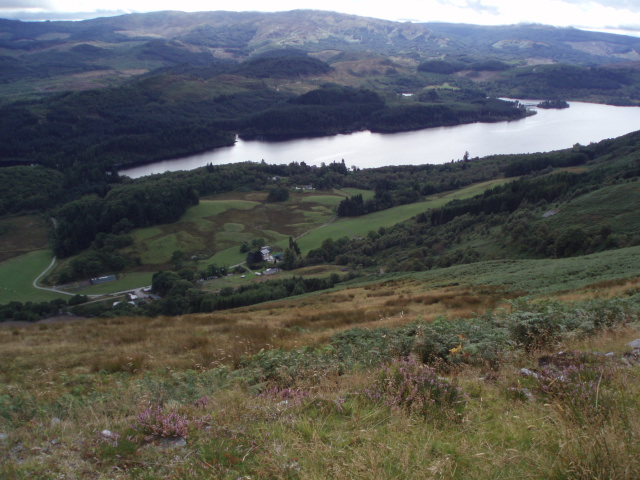
- Above Drumlean, looking down the hillside to Loch Ard

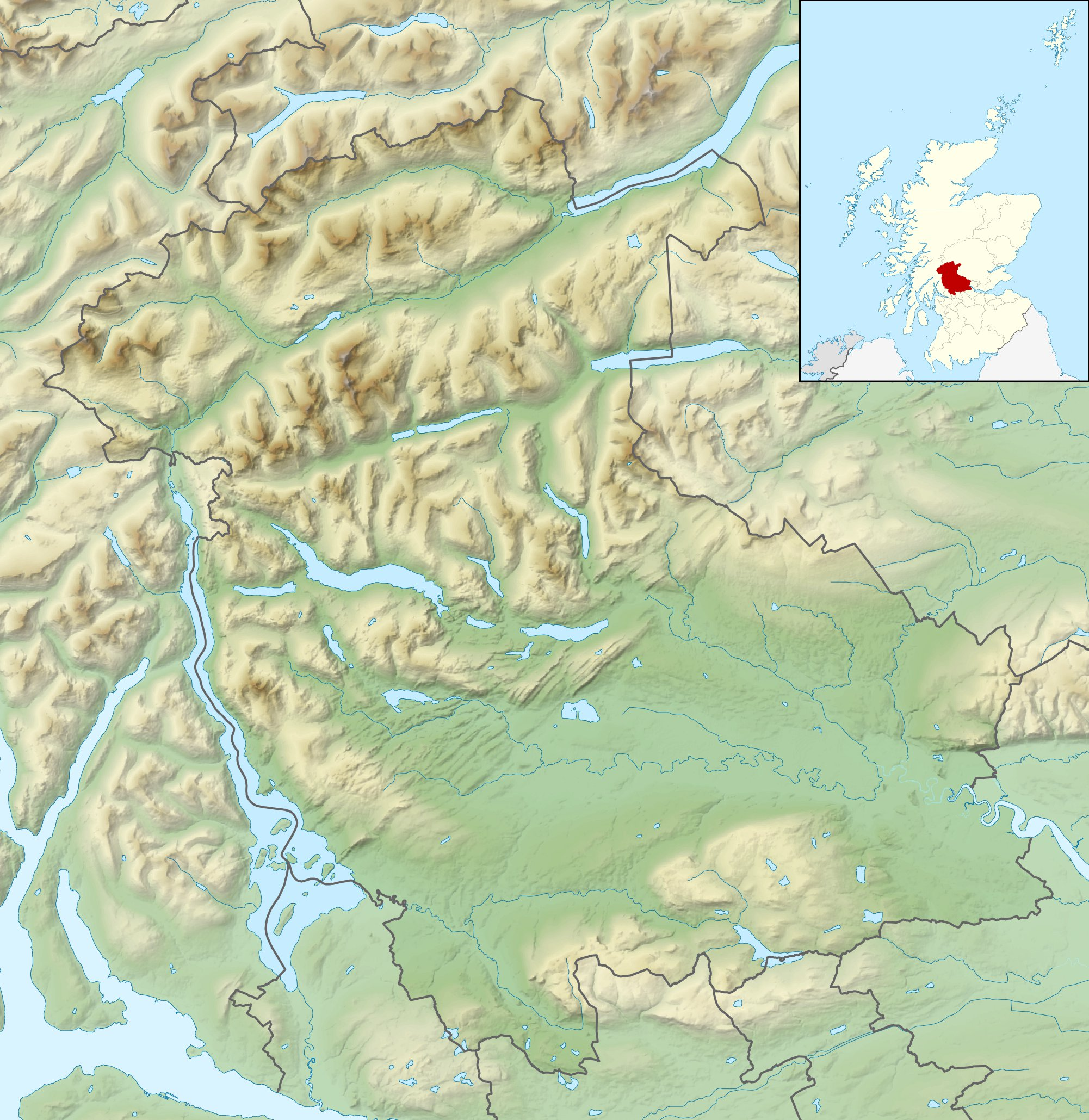
- Location within Stirling
- Location: Loch Lomond and the Trossachs National Park
- Coordinates: 56.1830°N 4.4712°W
- Type: Freshwater loch
- Primary outflows: River Forth
- Basin countries: Scotland
- Max. length: 3.75 km (2 mi 581 yd)
- Max. width: 0.6 km (0.37 mi)
- Surface area: 213.7 ha (528 acres)
- Average depth: 13 m (44 ft)
- Max. depth: 33 m (107 ft)
- Water volume: 33,000,000 m^{3} (1,150,000,000 ft^{3})
- Shore length^{1}: 11.8 km (7.3 mi)
- Surface elevation: 36 m (118 ft)
- Settlements: Kinlochard, Blairhullichan, Ledard, Milton
- ^{1} Shore length is not a well-defined measure.

Loch Ard (Scottish Gaelic: Loch na h-Àirde) is a loch, located in Loch Lomond and the Trossachs National Park, Stirling council area, Scotland.

== Overview ==
The name of the loch comes from àird, the Scottish Gaelic word for a promontory, headland, height, ultimately from àrd meaning high. The loch is approximately four by two kilometres (2 1/2 by 1 1/4 miles) in size and runs east-west along a sheltered glen. It is sometimes considered to be the source of the River Forth, although the river's true source is the confluence of its outflow, the Avondhu River, and Duchray Water. Loch Ard lies downstream of Loch Chon. The loch contains several small islands including Eilean Gorm, Briedach, St. Mallo, which is rumoured to have an old chapel dedicated to that saint, and Dundochill, which is the site of Duke Murdoch's castle that may have been built by the Duke of Albany. Though one of Scotland's smaller lochs, it is one of the most picturesque and its sheltered location means it is ideal for kayaking and other water sports.

R. B. Cunninghame Graham wrote:

Ben Lomond... seems to watch over the whole district and to dominate it. No sound is heard, except the babbling of the mountain streams as they slip down over the smooth stones, or the sharp belling of a roe in the thick alder copsewood that surrounds Loch Ard. The little wavelets break upon the pebbly beaches, or plash [sic] gently on the rocks of the steep islet on which Duke Murdoch's ruined castle stands. In Couligarten Bay the bulrushes bend gently as the homing wild ducks quatter [sic] down noiselessly amongst their stems, vanishing as silently as a seal slips into the sea.

== Location ==
The Queen Elizabeth Forest Park encompasses Loch Ard and the surrounding forest. The waters of Loch Ard are home to both a sailing and rowing club. The villages of Kinlochard, and Milton lie on its shores. The village of Aberfoyle lies two miles (three kilometres) to its east, with the summit of Craigmore behind it, while Ben Lomond sits to its west. The northern shores of Loch Ard are dominated by the mountain ridge of the 616-metre-tall (2,021 ft) Beinn an Fhogharaidh.

== Activities ==
Loch Ard is surrounded by 16 miles (26 kilometres) of family-friendly mountain bike, walking, and horseback trails. These trails, some with waymarkers, link into a much larger network of forest fire roads, which can take the rider on >30 km circular routes through the park. The Loch Ard Family Sculpture Trails provide an interactive outdoor experience, with sculptures placed along the trails, interesting seating, and sound posts, among other features.

Loch Ard is also home to many different species of wildlife, such as roe deer, barn owls, capercaillie, and various types of plants and insects. The loch also has a large stock of brown trout, pike, and perch.

Loch Ard, a three-masted, square-rigged clipper ship bore its name. The ship sank off the coast of Australia at what has been known since as Loch Ard Gorge.

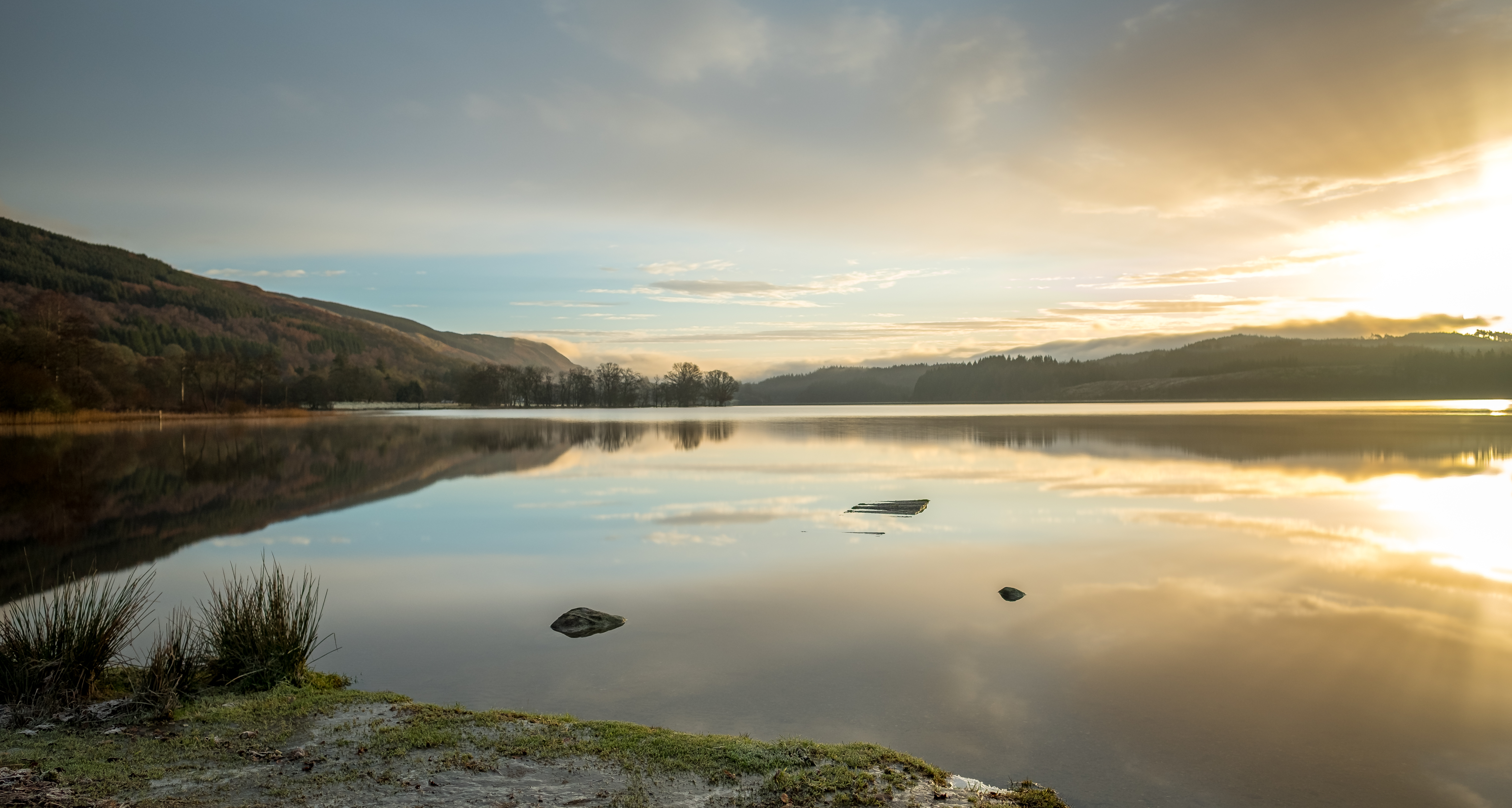
Sunrise over Loch Ard
