= Loch Chon =

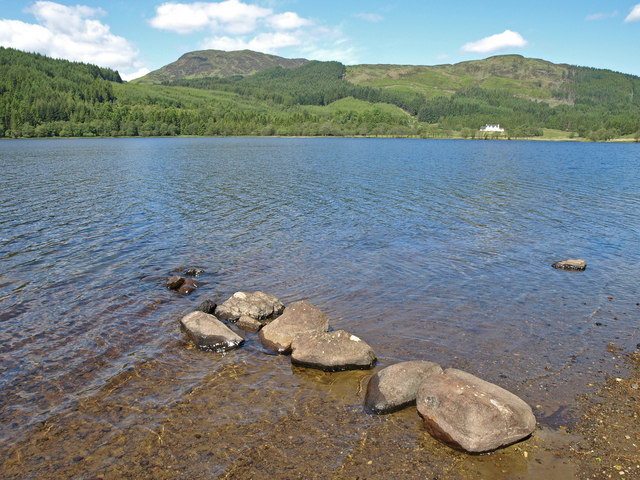
- View of Loch Chon looking over the north end of the loch towards the country house of Frenich and Loch Ard Forest.

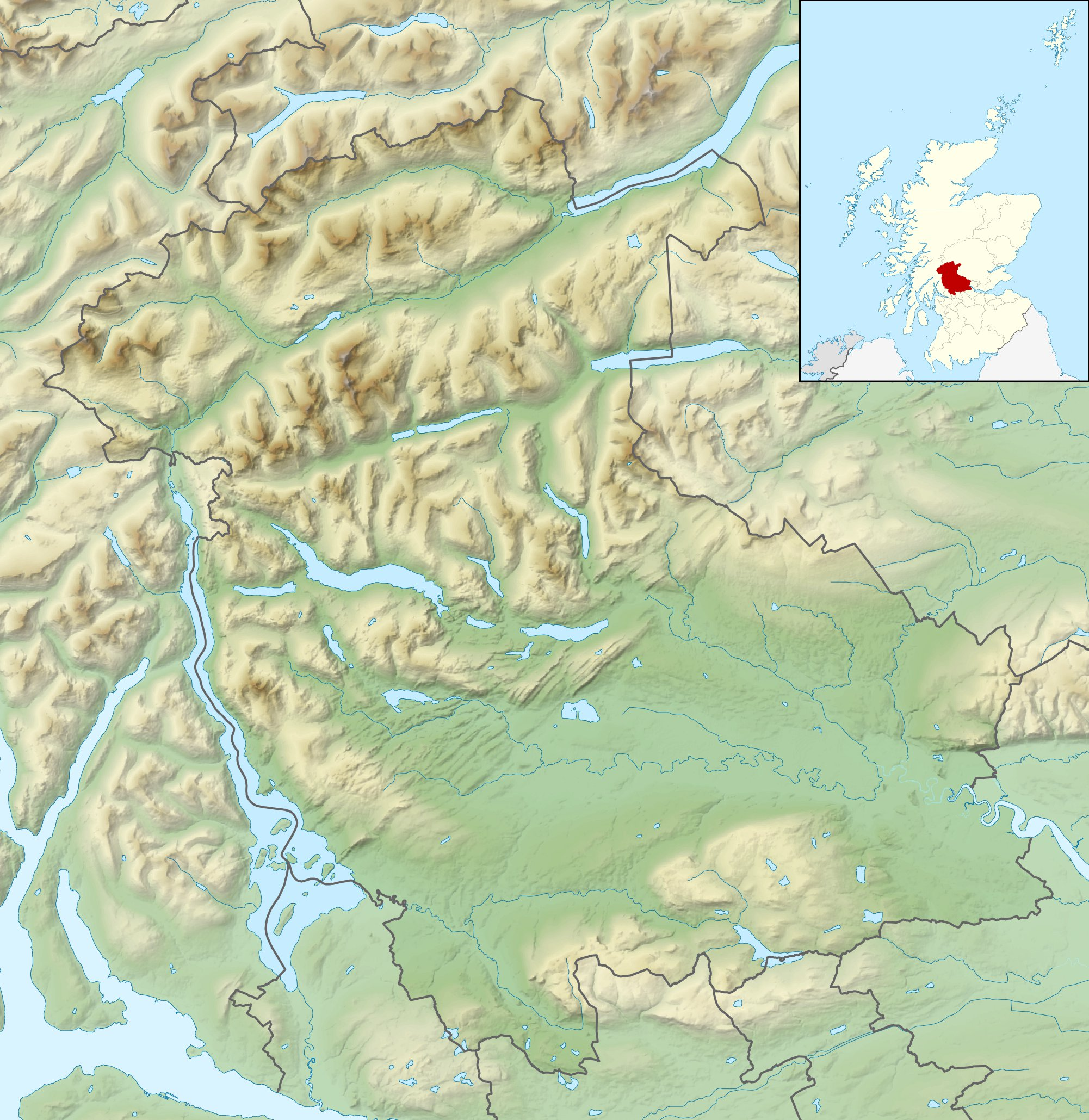
- Location within Stirling
- Location: Stirlingshire, Scotland
- Coordinates: 56.2145°N 4.548°W
- Type: freshwater loch
- Primary inflows: various streams
- Primary outflows: Water of Chon – Loch Ard – River Forth – Firth of Forth
- Max. length: 2.57 km (1.60 mi)
- Max. width: 0.38 km (0.24 mi)
- Surface area: 105.7 ha (261 acres)
- Average depth: 8.8 m (29 ft)
- Max. depth: 23 m (75 ft)
- Shore length^{1}: 7.2 km (4.5 mi)
- Surface elevation: 92 m (302 ft)
- Islands: Heron Island
- ^{1} Shore length is not a well-defined measure.

Loch Chon is a freshwater loch situated west of the village of Aberfoyle, near the small village of Kinlochard, Stirling, Scotland, UK. Loch Chon lies upstream of Loch Ard and to the south of Loch Katrine.

In the past, Loch Chon was known as Loch-a-Choin - loch of the dog/dogs. Choin is the Scots Gaelic word for dog in its genitive case (coin), lenited because loch is a masculine noun, causing an 'h' to be placed after the 'c'.

It releases its water into the 4.5-kilometre (2.8 mi) long Water of Chon, which not far from the outlet passes Loch Dhu, and is the main affluent of Loch Ard. Loch Chon itself is fed by several small streams which can be considered to be the true sources of the River Forth.

There are three islands in the loch. Two are unnamed, including the largest, which is roughly 315 feet/96 metres long. The medium sized island is called Heron Island and is roughly 230 feet/70 metres long.

== Geology ==
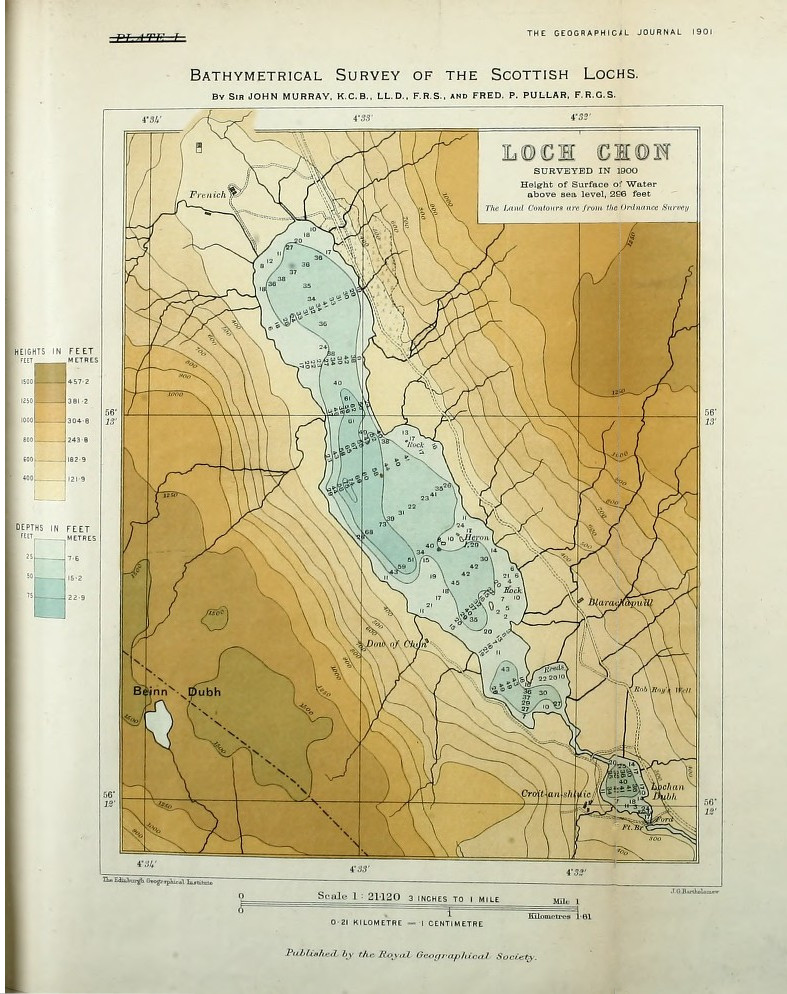
Bathymetrical survey of Loch Chon

According to Ben Peach and John Horne, published in the 1910 Bathymetrical survey of the Scottish fresh-water lochs, Loch Chon is a striking example of a rock basin. The upper portion of the lake is floored by mica-schists, and the lower portion by Ben Ledi grits and schistose epidotic grits ("Green Beds"), the members of the two latter groups being repeated by sharp folds. The trend of the loch — N.N.W. and S.S.E. — is oblique to the strike of the strata. At the head of the lake there is a broad alluvial flat, where it has been silted up for a distance of one-third mile (0.54 km) by the detritus laid down by the adjacent streams. In the northern part of the basin the deepest soundings vary from 33 to 67 feet (10 to 20 m); but at a point about one-half mile (0.80 km) below the present head of the lake the depth increases from 40 to 60 feet (12 to 18 m) and upwards.

This feature coincides with a line of fault that crosses the loch in a north-east and south-west direction, its downthrow being to the south-east. From this point southwards for one-half mile (0.80 km) there is a narrow basin enclosed within the 50 feet (15 m) contour-line, and within this basin there is a narrow trough, about 100 yards (91 m) long and upwards of 75 feet (23 m) deep, near the west margin of the lake. There is ground for the belief that nearly the whole of the basin bounded by the 50 feet (15 m) contour-line is floored by mica-schist.

About 1 mile (1.6 km) below the head of the lake the soundings prove a remarkable decrease in the depth, the 25 feet (7.6 m) contour-line near the Heron islands being deflected towards the centre of the loch. The shallowing of the basin here takes place along the outcrop of very massive epidotic grits ("Green Beds") several glaciated rocky islands appearing along this line. Southwards to the mouth of the lake there are alternations of Ben Ledi grits and schistose epidotic grits, the narrowest parts of the lake coinciding with the exposures of the latter group.

About 100 yards (91 m) below the outlet of the lake a prominent band of schistose epidotic grits occurs, formed a rocky barrier during the glaciation of that region. Beyond this outcrop there is a small shallow basin, about 41 feet (12 m) deep (Loch Dhu), floored by schistose grits, which is traversed by a fault trending north-east and south-west, with a downthrow to the east. Across the mouth of this basin a band of massive, pebbly grits of the Ben Ledi type has been traced.

The direction of the ice-flow during the great glaciation coincides generally with the trend of the loch, striae being found on the rocky islands as well as round the margin of the lake. The evidence supplied by soundings tends to support the theory that the basin-shaped hollow has been eroded by ice-action. The dislocations referred to above have doubtless produced local modifications of the floor of Loch Chon and Loch Dhu, but they do not account for the excavation of the basin.

== Camping ==
The north and east sides of Loch Chon fall within one of Loch Lomond and the Trossachs National Park's camping management zones, established by the introduction of byelaws in 2017. This means that, between March and September of each year, wild camping is not allowed within 200 metres of the shore line.

However, the west shore of Loch Chon and its islands are not within the camping management zone. Therefore, wild camping is allowed there, provided the other byelaws, such as that prohibiting gathering dead wood, and the Scottish Outdoor Access Code, are followed.

There is a campsite run by the Loch Lomond and the Trossachs National Park on the east side of the loch, open from March through to September. This was established in 2017, as part of the provisions in the byelaws that they provide affordable camping opportunities.
