= Beinn an Fhogharaidh =

Mountain ridge in the Scottish Highlands

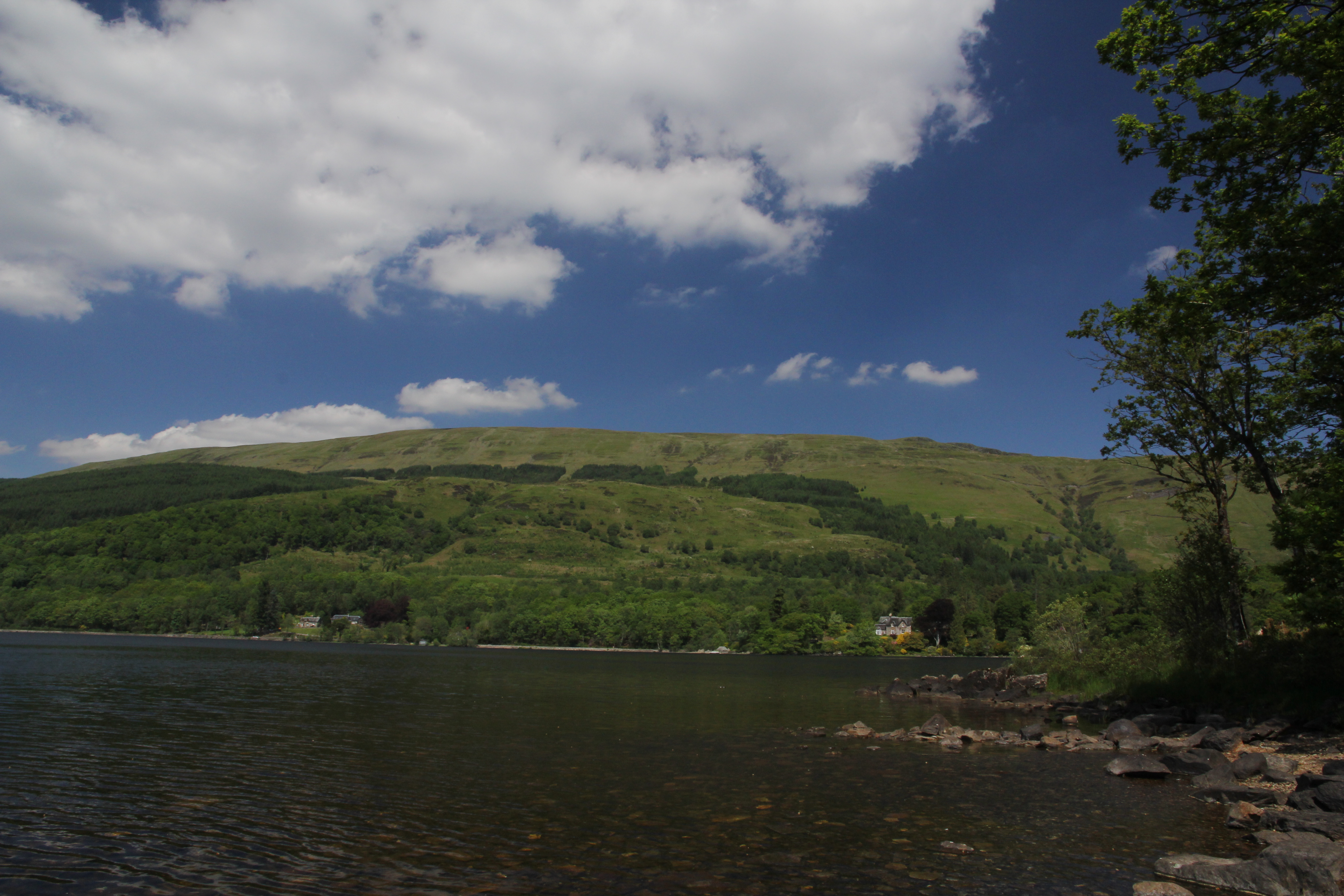
- Beinn an Fhogharaidh rising above the north shore of Loch Ard

Highest point
- Elevation: 616 m (2,021 ft)
- Prominence: 21 m (69 ft)
- Parent peak: Ben Venue
- Isolation: 1.6 km (0.99 mi)
- Listing: subGraham Top, subSimm
- Coordinates: 56°12′08″N 4°27′35″W

Naming
- Language of name: Scottish Gaelic

Geography
- Location: Trossachs, Scottish Highlands, UK
- Parent range: Grampians
- OS grid: NN475038
- Topo map: OS Landranger 57

Climbing
- Easiest route: track from Ledard Farm

Beinn an Fhogharaidh is a mountain ridge, 616 metres (2,021 ft) high, in the southern Scottish Highlands near the village of Aberfoyle in Stirling council area, Scotland.

== Location ==
Beinn an Fhogharaidh rises about 6 kilometres (3.7 mi) west-northwest of Aberfoyle and around sixteen kilometres south by west of the nearest town of Callander, in the council area of Stirling and within the Loch Lomond and The Trossachs National Park.

The highest point of the double summit is about one mile due south of the peak of Ben Venue and lies between Creag Innich (522 metres (1,713 ft)) to the east and Stob an Lochain (684 metres (2,244 ft)), an outlier of Ben Venue, to the northwest.

== Description ==
The mountain forms a long, treeless ridge branching off the southern end of the Ben Venue ridge (727 metres (2,385 ft)) and running roughly northwest to southeast above the northern shores of Loch Ard in the Trossachs region of the Grampians, the southern part of the Scottish Highlands. It has a double summit, the highest point being to the east and only one metre higher than the west top, which is some 500 metres away and separated by a shallow col some ten metres or so below. The lower half of the mountainside, on both its northern and southern sides, is covered in forest, part of the Queen Elizabeth Forest Park.

== Ascent ==
A track to Ledard Farm branches off the B 829 road that runs along the north shore of Loch Ard and climbs the southeast spur of Beinn an Fhogharaidh, below the summit of Creag Innich. Just over halfway up the ridge, the track divides and the right hand branch swings around in a loop and runs just below the crest of the main ridge. It passes just below the summit and crosses the west top before continuing to the crags of Stob an Lochain.
