= Milton, Stirling =

Coordinates: 56.184°N 4.409°W

Milton: Scottish Gaelic: Baile a' Mhuilinn
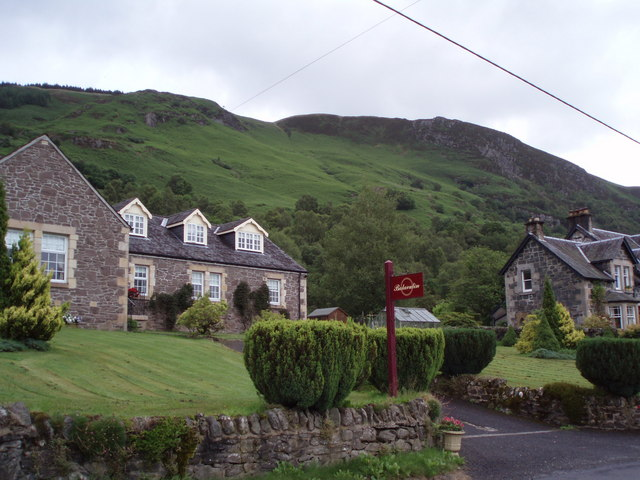
- Hillside to the north of Milton

- Location within the Stirling council area
- Population: 98
- OS grid reference: NN505016
- Civil parish: Aberfoyle
- Council area: Stirling
- Lieutenancy area: Stirling and Falkirk
- Country: Scotland
- Sovereign state: United Kingdom
- Post town: Stirling
- Postcode district: FK8
- Dialling code: 01786
- Police: Scotland
- Fire: Scottish
- Ambulance: Scottish
- UK Parliament: Stirling and Strathallan
- Scottish Parliament: Stirling

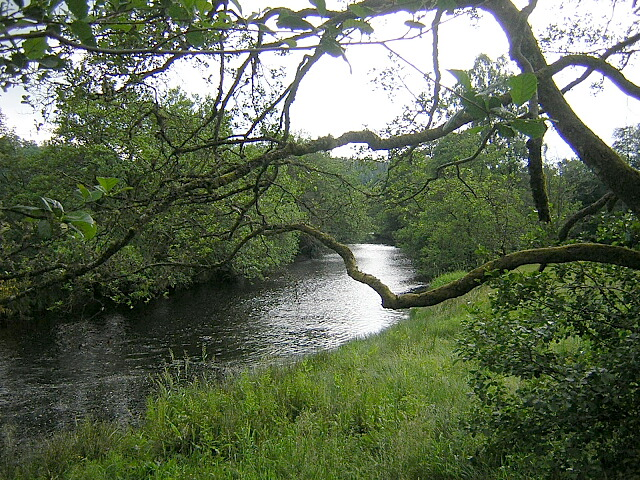
Duchray Water near Milton

Milton is a hamlet in Stirling, Scotland near Aberfoyle situated above the River Forth. In 1961 it had a population of 98. Most pupils attend Aberfoyle Primary School. Older pupils usually attend McLaren High School, Callander.

The derelict Milton Mill with its 14-foot cast iron wheel dates from 1667.
