= Craigmore (hill) =

Hill in Scotland

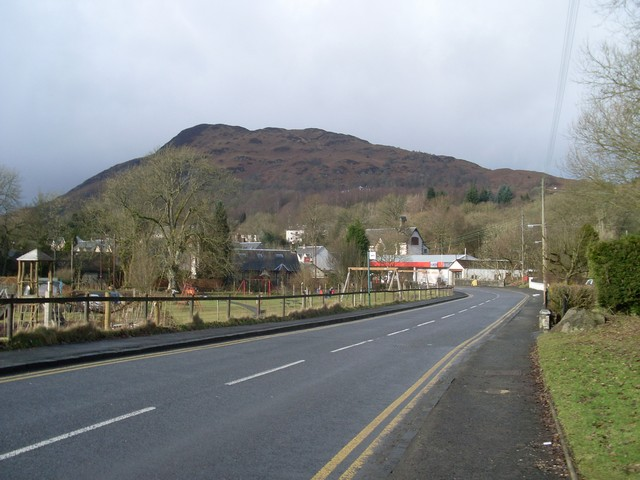
- Craigmore seen from the town of Aberfoyle

Highest point
- Elevation: 387 m (1,270 ft)
- Prominence: 40 m (130 ft)
- Parent peak: Ben Venue
- Listing: TuMP
- Coordinates: 56°11′14″N 4°24′09″W

Naming
- Language of name: Scottish Gaelic

Geography
- Location: near Aberfoyle, Stirling, Scotland, United Kingdom
- OS grid: NN510020

Craigmore is a prominent hill, 387 metres high, above the village of Aberfoyle in the council area of Stirling in Scotland.

== Geography ==
The summit of Craigmore rises about a mile northwest of the centre of Aberfoyle. The top of the hill and much of the upper southern and eastern slopes are open moorland with a few scattered trees. At its southern foot, the River Forth, accompanied by the B829 road to Loch Ard and the village of Stronachlacher, runs from west to east. To the north and northwest, a line of increasingly higher peaks runs all the way to Ben Venue about 3 miles away. To the east, the A821 climbs up to the Duke's Pass. On the other side of this road is the David Marshall Lodge, a visitor centre for the Trossachs region.

Although it is not particularly high, Craigmore appears prominent due to its location on the fringes of the Trossachs range and its steep southerly slopes that drop sharply down to the valley of the River Forth and the Scottish Lowlands beyond.

== History ==
On the steep, south face of the hill is an old quarry that once supplied blue-grey dolerite for the traditional buildings of Aberfoyle. About a kilometre north of the summit are Aberfoyle Quarries, disused slate quarries that were used to supply roofing material for the railways and for much of central Scotland. The route of the old tramway, which transported men and material from the quarries to the local branch line, is still discernible.

== Ascent ==
The Lodge Visitor Centre is the easiest start point for an ascent of Craigmore, a path branching off the A821 and heading up to the line of the old tramway. From there the route follows the top of the ridge to the summit. Craigmore can also be tackled from Aberfoyle itself, passing near the visitor centre on the way. There is a cairn at the top.

== Views ==
From the summit there are views of Loch Ard, Ben Lomond and the Arrochar Alps as well as the Scottish Lowlands.
