= Kinlochard =

Village in Scotland

Coordinates: 56.188°N 4.491°W

Kinlochard: Scottish Gaelic: Ceann Loch na h-Airde
- Scottish Village
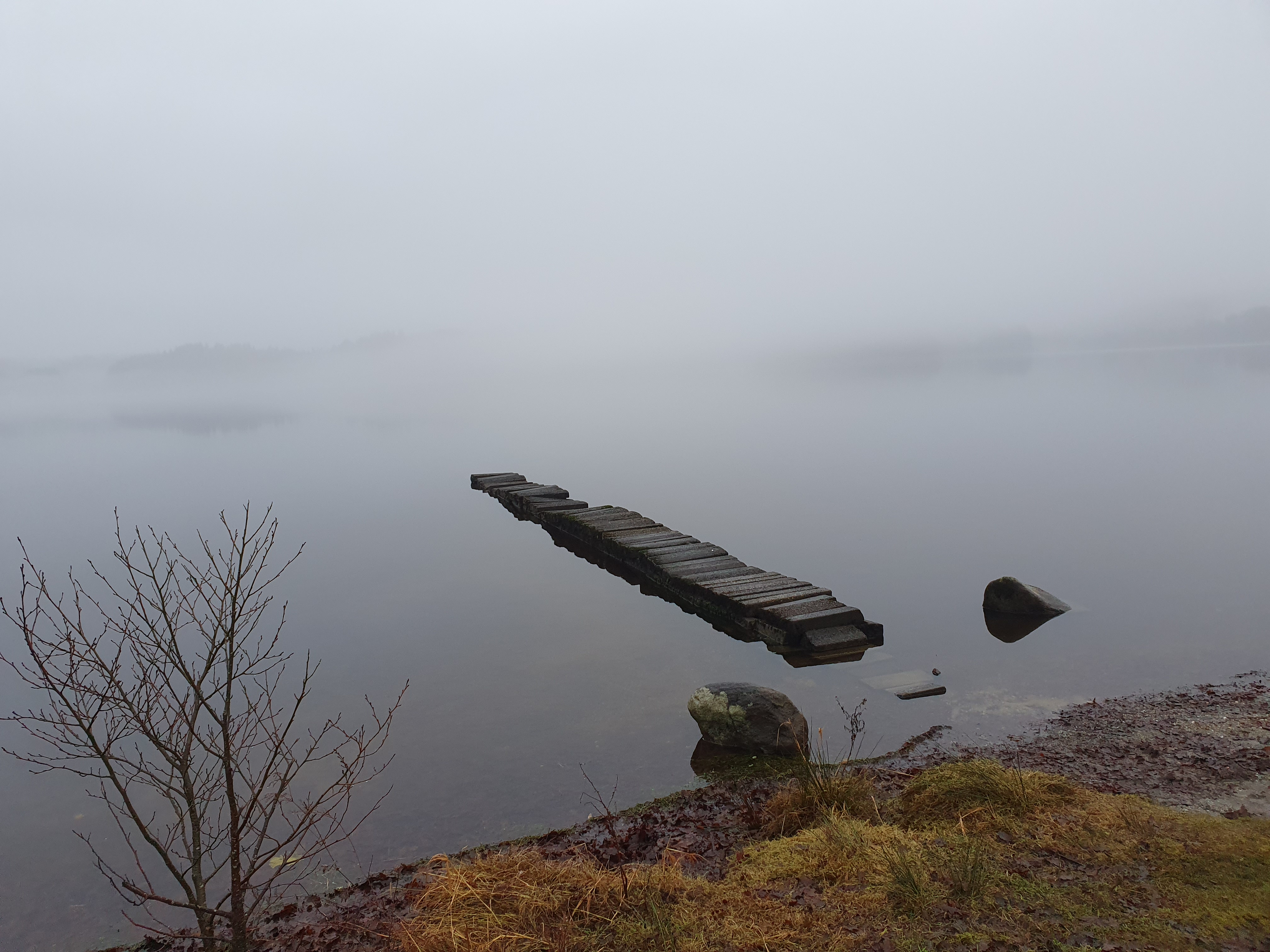

- Location within the Stirling council area
- Population: 150
- OS grid reference: NN454022
- Civil parish: Aberfoyle
- Council area: Stirling
- Lieutenancy area: Stirling and Falkirk
- Country: Scotland
- Sovereign state: United Kingdom
- Post town: STIRLING
- Postcode district: FK8
- Dialling code: 01877
- Police: Scotland
- Fire: Scottish
- Ambulance: Scottish
- UK Parliament: Stirling and Strathallan
- Scottish Parliament: Stirling

Kinlochard is small village in Stirlingshire, Western/Central Scotland. It is located at the western end of Loch Ard (near Aberfoyle), approximately 25 miles north of Glasgow (as the crow flies). The village is in Strathard, which stretches from near the northern end of Loch Lomond, south, to near Gartmore. The name Kinlochard can be broken into three parts - "Kin", derived from the Gaelic word "ceann" meaning "head", loch, and ard. Put together, it means "Head of Loch Ard".

== Population ==
According to the 2001 census, Kinlochard has a population of 584, though a more recent estimation in the Community Life Plan suggests the population to be closer to ~150. This was based on participation in community consultations and online questionnaires.

=== School Life ===
Schools Attended By Kinlochard Residents
Age	Stage	School
3-5 years	Nursery	Aberfoyle Nursery
5-12 years	Primary	Aberfoyle Primary
12-18 years	Secondary	McLaren High

Aberfoyle Nursery & Primary (located on the same premises) is approximately 4 miles away from Kinlochard (in Aberfoyle). Most pupils who attend the primary school from Kinlochard use the council contracted taxi from the village to the school.

McLaren High School is approximately 15 miles away from Kinlochard. It is located in Callander. Pupils get to McLaren from Kinlochard by also using a council contracted taxi which takes the pupils part of the way, to Aberfoyle, where they then get on a larger Midland Bluebird run M4 bus route, taking them the rest of the way.

== Village Hall ==
Kinlochard Village Hall was first built 1958 on land that was gifted to the village by the Joynston family. In 2011, the hall was upgraded and extended and remains like this to this day. Funds for the renovation were raised over 10 years with many grant applications and events. Most of the funding came from the Kinlochard annual Highland Games, which no longer take place. It is a registered charity (SC024877). The hall is community run, and managed by the Village Hall Committee. The village hall is opposite a lochside field which becomes very popular during the summer. You can book the hall for events such as weddings, retreats, parties, and more.

== The Field Project ==
In early 2026, Kinlochard took community ownership of 'The Field' after years of efforts. The land was set to be developed on, which raised concerns among locals for the wellbeing of the land and it's ecosystem. The land is now protected.

== Transport ==
Historically, Kinlochard was well served by a local bus route connecting it to places such as Aberfoyle, though this service was lost and Kinlochard remained unconnected until early 2026 when a new bus service, operated by Stirling Council, began serving Kinlochard and surrounding villages. The C61 route connects Kinlochard to two main hubs - Aberfoyle and Callander.
