= Duke's Pass =

Pass on the A821 road in the Scottish Highlands

Duke's Pass/ Dukes Pass
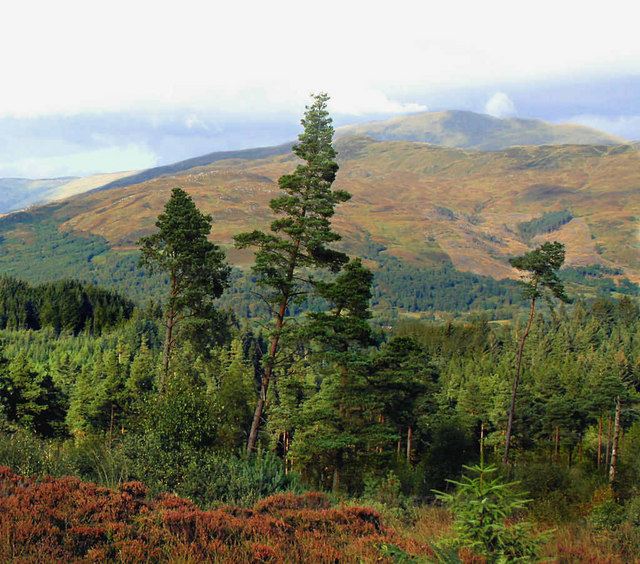
- Duke's Pass with Ben Ledi in the background.
- Interactive map of Duke's Pass/ Dukes Pass

Third Approach
- Location: Trossachs, Scotland, UK
- OS grid: NN5181903720
- Coordinates: 56°12′11″N 4°23′25″W

Duke's Pass or Dukes Pass is a pass on the A821 road between Aberfoyle and Brig o' Turk in the glen of the Trossachs in the Scottish Highlands. It climbs to a height of 240 metres (790 ft) above sea level.

The name only appears on modern Ordnance Survey maps, but is in common use locally. The road was built by the Duke of Montrose in 1885, hence the name.
