= Aberfoyle, Stirling =

Coordinates: 56.179°N 4.385°W

Aberfoyle: Scottish Gaelic: Obar Phuill
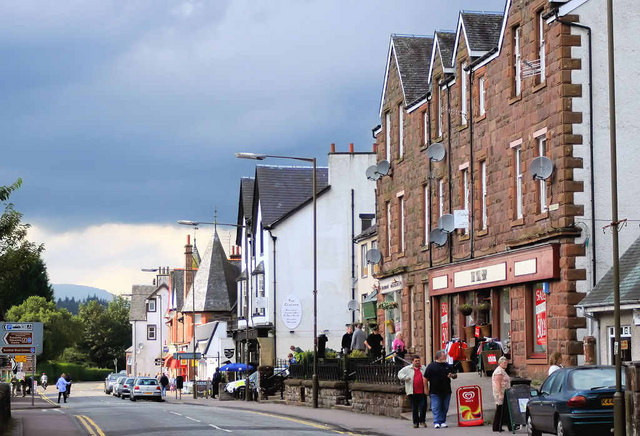
- The main street in Aberfoyle

- Location within the Stirling council area
- Population: 790 (2020)
- OS grid reference: NN518012
  - Edinburgh: 49 mi (79 km)
  - London: 366 mi (589 km)
- Civil parish: Aberfoyle
- Council area: Stirling
- Lieutenancy area: Stirling and Falkirk
- Country: Scotland
- Sovereign state: United Kingdom
- Post town: STIRLING
- Postcode district: FK8
- Dialling code: 01877
- Police: Scotland
- Fire: Scottish
- Ambulance: Scottish
- UK Parliament: Stirling and Strathallan
- Scottish Parliament: Stirling

Aberfoyle (Scottish Gaelic: Obar Phuill) is a village in the historic county and registration county of Perthshire and the council area of Stirling, Scotland. The settlement lies 27 miles (43 kilometres) north of Glasgow.

The parish of Aberfoyle takes its name from this village, and had a population of 1,065 at the 2011 census.

== Geography ==
The town is situated on the River Forth at the foot of Craigmore (387 m or 1,270 ft high). Since 1885, when the Duke of Montrose constructed a road over the eastern shoulder of Craigmore to join the older road at the entrance of the Trossachs pass, Aberfoyle has become the alternative route to the Trossachs and Loch Katrine; this road, known as the Duke's Road or Duke's Pass, was opened to the public in 1931 when the Forestry Commission acquired the land.

Loch Ard, about 2 miles (3 kilometres) west of Aberfoyle, lies 40 m (130 ft) above the sea. It is 3 mi (5 km) long (including the narrows at the east end) and 1 mi (1.5 km) broad. Towards the west end is Eilean Gorm (the green isle), and near the north-western shore are the falls of Ledard. The loch's northern shores are dominated by the mountain ridge of Beinn an Fhogharaidh (616 m or 2,021 ft). Two miles (three kilometres) northwest of Loch Ard is Loch Chon, at 90 m (300 ft) above the sea, 1 1/4 mi (2 km) long and about 1/2 mi (800 m) broad. It drains by the Avon Dhu to Loch Ard, which is drained in turn by the Forth.

== Toponym ==
Aberfoyle supposedly originates from the Brittonic Celtic, aber poll or aber phuill (Scottish Gaelic, Obar Phuill), meaning (place at the) mouth of the Phuill Burn (the Pow Burn enters the River Forth at Aberfoyle). Historically, alternative spellings such as Abirfull, Aberfule, Aberfoill and Aberfoil have been recorded before the current spelling became accepted by the 20th century. The river-name is from either Gaelic poll or Brittonic pol, both of which mean 'pool, sluggish water'.

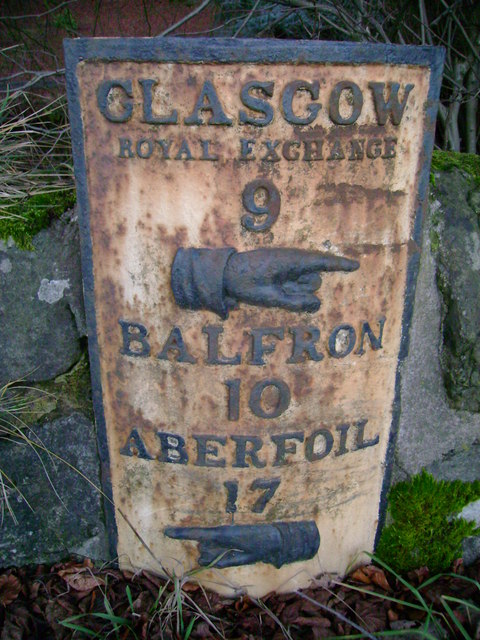
An old milepost near Craigmaddie House. Notice the spelling of Aberfoyle.

== Industry ==
The slate quarries on Craigmore which operated from the 1820s to the 1950s are now defunct; at its peak this was a major industry. Other industries included an ironworks, established in the 1720s, as well as wool spinning and a lint mill.

From 1882 the village was served by Aberfoyle railway station, the terminus of the Strathendrick and Aberfoyle Railway which connected to Glasgow via Dumbarton or Kirkintilloch. The station closed to passenger traffic in 1951, and the remaining freight services ceased in 1959.

The above industries have since died out, and Aberfoyle is supported mainly by the forestry, industry and tourism.

== Tourism ==
Visitors were first attracted to Aberfoyle and the surrounding area after the publication of The Lady of the Lake by Sir Walter Scott in 1810. The poem described the beauty of Loch Katrine. Aberfoyle describes itself as The Gateway to the Trossachs, and is well situated for visitors to access attractions such as Loch Lomond and Inchmahome Priory at the Lake of Menteith. Aberfoyle Golf Club was built in 1860 and is located just south of town near the Rob Roy restaurant. Aberfoyle is also part of the Loch Lomond and The Trossachs National Park.

Aberfoyle is also home to the largest Go Ape adventure course in the UK, featuring the longest death slide, or 'zip-line', in the UK.

== Historical figures ==
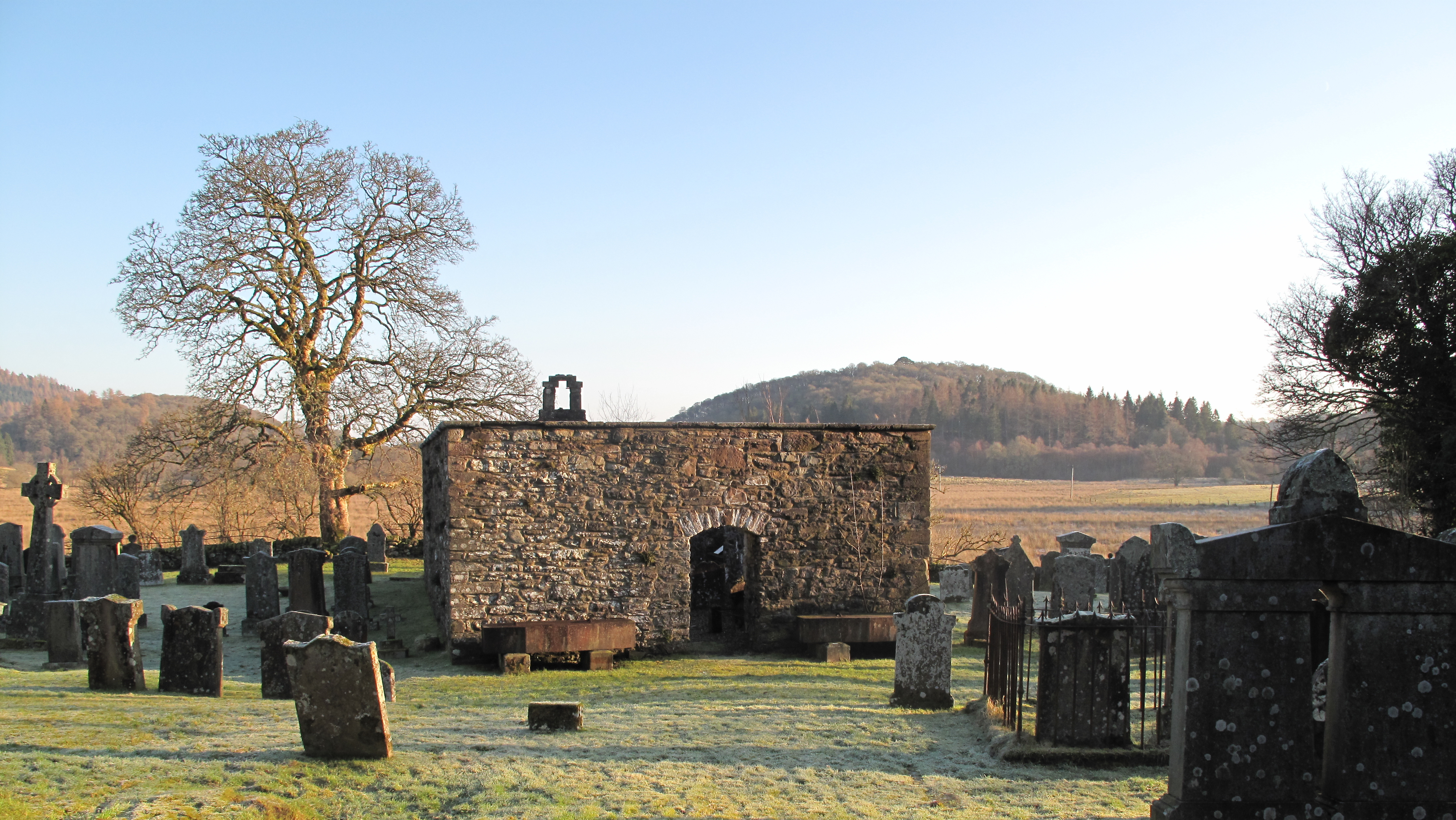
Visit the grave of the Rev Robert Kirk at the Old Kirk in Aberfoyle

Aberfoyle has connections to many historical figures such as Áedán mac Gabráin, Rob Roy and Mary, Queen of Scots. A Life of the Irish saint Berach of Cluain Chairpthe has the saint travel to Eperpuill (Aberfoyle) to seek Áedán mac Gabráin's adjudication in a land dispute. Robert Roy MacGregor was born at the head of nearby Loch Katrine, and his well-known cattle stealing exploits took him all around the area surrounding Aberfoyle. It is recorded, for example, that in 1691, the MacGregors raided every barn in the village of Kippen and stole all the villagers' livestock. There currently stands a tree in the village that MacGregor was reputed to have climbed and hid in to escape the clutches of the law. Also, Mary, Queen of Scots, visited nearby Inchmahome Priory often as a child, and during her short reign. She also used the priory during her short reign, particularly in 1547, where she felt safe from the English Army.

However, the most local historical figure is the Reverend Robert Kirk, born in 1644. It was the Rev. Kirk who provided the first translation into Scottish Gaelic of the Metrical Psalms and then the whole Christian Bible, however, he is better remembered for the publication of his book "The Secret Commonwealth of Elves, Fauns, and Fairies" in 1691. Kirk had long been researching fairies, and the book collected several personal accounts and stories of folk who claimed to have encountered them.

== Use in fiction ==
- Aberfoyle was used as the location and inspiration for the adventure novel "Les Indes noires" (English title: The Child of the Cavern) by Jules Verne.
- The "Clachan of Aberfoil", then (in 1715) a small hamlet, plays a significant role in the second Volume of the novel Rob Roy by Walter Scott.

== See also ==
- List of places in Stirling (council area)
