= Headland Archaeology =

Headland Group Ltd
- Founded: 1996, UK
- Headquarters: Edinburgh, UK
- Key people: Andy Norton (Managing Director)
- Number of employees: c. 250
- Website: www.headlandarchaeology.com

Headland Archaeology Ltd is a wholly owned subsidiary of the RSK Group. Headland provides archaeological services and heritage advice to the construction industry.

== Company history ==
Headland Archaeology Ltd was established in 1996. Headquartered in Edinburgh, this company expanded as a provider of commercial archaeology services in the UK. Expansion into the Irish market led to the establishment of Headland Archaeology (Ireland) Ltd in 2000, in County Cork.

Restructuring of the companies in May and June 2008 involved the renaming of Headland Archaeology Ltd as Headland Group Limited. A new company, Headland Archaeology (UK) Limited, was founded at this time to give, in conjunction with Headland Archaeology (Ireland) Ltd, a coherent structure to the group based on trading areas.

The acquisition of Hereford-based Archaeological Investigations Ltd in 2010 expanded its UK operation. Archaeological Investigations Ltd was subsequently assimilated as a regional office of Headland Archaeology (UK) Limited by October 2010, with the underlying company dissolved in September 2012. The company opened a southeast office in 2011, initially in Leighton Buzzard later moving to Silsoe in Bedfordshire, and a northern office based in Beeston, Leeds in 2015. In December 2011, there was a management buyout of Headland Archaeology (Ireland) Ltd.

The Headland Group was acquired by the RSK Group in March 2019 but continues to trade as Headland Archaeology (UK) Limited.

=== Registered archaeological organisation ===
By 2001, Headland Archaeology Ltd had become a Registered Archaeological Organisation with the Institute for Archaeologists (reference number RAO40). This registration has been continued and was transferred to Headland Archaeology (UK) Limited during the company re-organisation in 2008.

== Projects ==
The following are a selection of Headland Archaeology projects.

=== Major projects ===
UK

- A14 Huntingdon to Cambridge Road Improvement Scheme
- M74 northern extension to M8, 19th century urban and industrial sites
  The 'Hostage Stone', an inscribed slate from the 9th century monastic settlement on the Island of Inchmarnock
- Scottish Parliament, Edinburgh
- The Newbridge chariot, Edinburgh
- Verreville Glass and Pottery Works, Glasgow
- The Inchmarnock Project, monastic settlement, Argyll and Bute
- Whithorn Priory, a Medieval priory

Ireland

- Carlow Bypass N9/N10
- N25 Waterford Bypass
- N7 Dual Carriageway Nenagh to Limerick

=== Archaeological excavations ===
- Dubton Farm, Brechin, Angus. A wood-lined souterrain inside an Iron Age roundhouse.
- Balblair Cist, Beauly, near Inverness, Bronze Age burial cairn
- Bewell Street, Hereford
- Burgh by Sands, Aballava, Hadrian's Wall Roman fort
- Carrowkeel, N6 road scheme, Ireland. Early Christian and medieval settlement and cemetery
- Cowgate, Edinburgh. Medieval town wall
- Doune, Stirling, Roman fort
- Captain's Cabin, Dunbar, East Lothian, multi-phase settlement
- Cathedral Close, Hereford Cathedral
- Gasswater, East Ayrshire, medieval turf building
- Giles Street, Leith, Edinburgh. Medieval remains
- Holm, Inverness, Bronze Age cists
- Grassmarket, Edinburgh
- Hackness battery, Longhope, Orkney
- Shanzie Souterrain, Alyth, Perthshire. Iron Age underground structure
- Straiton Quarry, Newport-on-Tay, Fife. Bronze Age cremation burials
- Park Square Campus, University of Bedfordshire, Luton
- Perceton, North Ayrshire, Medieval Manor
- Upper Forth Crossing, Kincardine, Clackmannan. Prehistoric and medieval remains
- Queensferry Crossing, Edinburgh and Fife. Mesolithic, Neolithic, Bronze Age, and medieval remains

=== Environmental archaeology ===
- Clonycavan Man, Ireland
- Geoarchaeological Regional Review of Marine Deposits along the Coastline of Southern England
- Isle of Bute Master Chronology
- Newrath, County Kilkenny, multi period wetland site
- N9/N10 Kilcullen to Waterford scheme, pH analysis of burnt mounds
- Old Croghan Man, Ireland
- Ötzi, The Tyrolean Ice man, analysis of his last meal

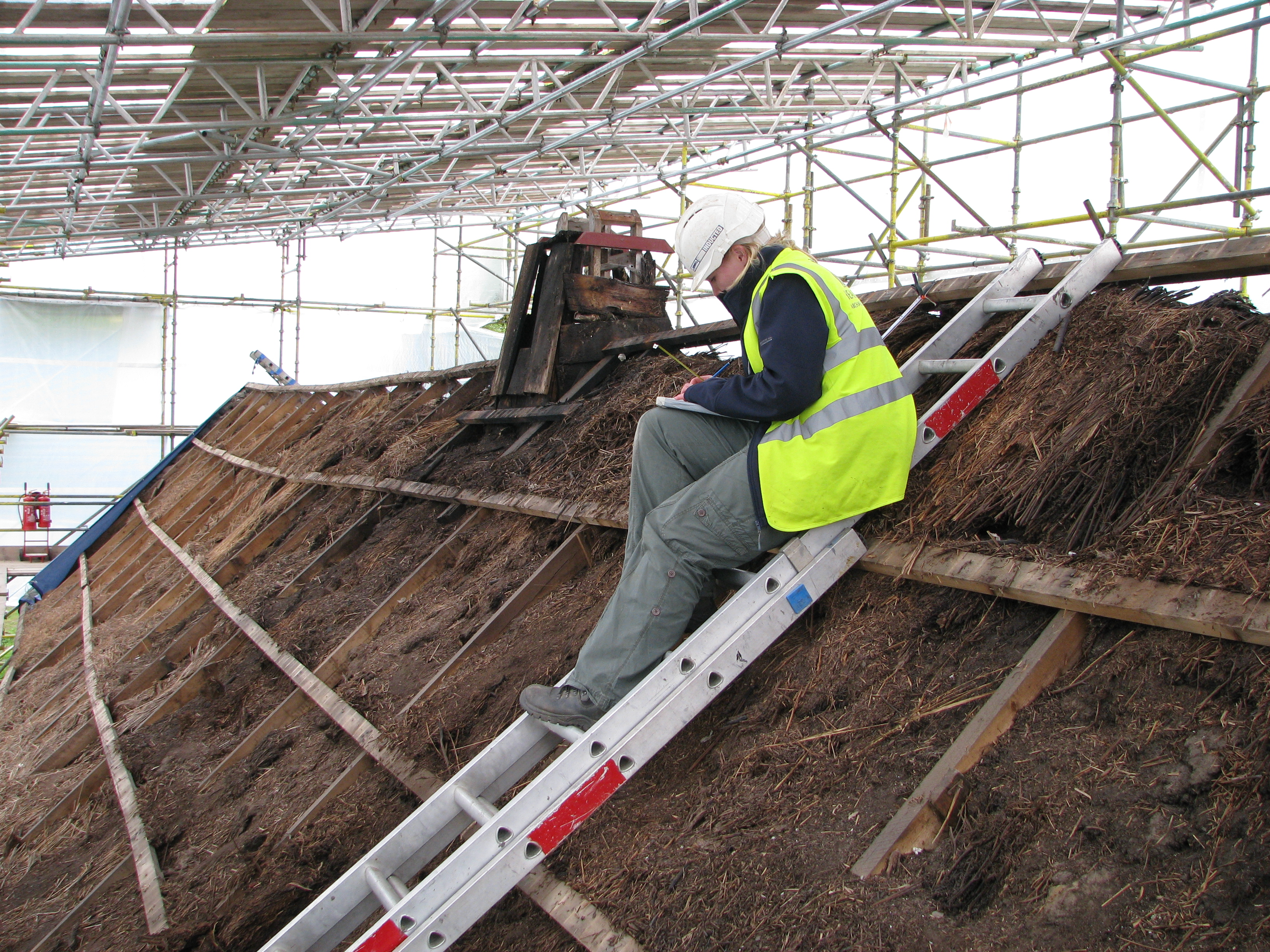
Excavation of the thatched roof at Moirlanich Longhouse

=== Heritage management ===
- Irish Battlefields Project
- Ewyas Harold Priory, Herefordshire

=== Historic buildings ===
- The Arnol Blackhouses, Isle of Lewis
- The Dirleton Radar Station, East Lothian
- Dunnet, Brotchie's farm steading, Caithness
- Gasworks, Kilkenny, Ireland. Retort house
- Kerse House, Grangemouth, country house of Sir Lawrence Dundas
- Kisimul Castle, Isle of Barra
- Moirlanich Longhouse, Killin, thatching & vernacular building.
- Temple Mains Farm, Innerwick, farm steading, East Lothian
- Waverley Mill, Galashiels

=== Industrial archaeology ===
- Madelvic works, Edinburgh
- Mount Pleasant Pipeworks, Woodville, Derbyshire
  Mount Pleasant Works - Tunnel kiln
- ROF Rotherwas, Hereford
- Shrubhill Tram Depot, Edinburgh

=== Maritime archaeology ===
- City of Adelaide clipper - laser scan
- Leamington Wharf, Union Canal, Edinburgh
- A Zulu Herring Drifter at the Scottish Fisheries Museum - laser scan
