= Killin Music Festival =

Music festival held in Killin, Perthshire, Scotland

- Genre: Celtic music
- Locations: Killin, Stirling, Scotland
- Years active: 1995 – 2003, 2016–present
- Website: www.killinmusicfest.com

Killin Music Fest is a Scottish music festival held in Killin, Perthshire.

== Killin Music Fest ==
The festival was launched in late 2015 by a local voluntary team who started planning for their first event in the summer of 2016.

In June 2016, the weekend festival was attended by nearly 1,000 people and hosted over 100 artists across Friday 17, Saturday 18 and Sunday 19 June 2016. The festival incorporates one main stage in the McLaren Hall, Killin, along with workshops, sessions and fringe activities throughout the area.

In November 2016 the festival was nominated as the Best New Festival at the UK Festival Awards 2016.

In June 2017, the festival expanded to include a session tent marquee.

In November 2017, the festival was nominated for Event of the Year in the MG Alba Scots Trad Music Awards 2017, one of five finalists.

In February 2018, the festival was nominated for an Epic Award from Voluntary Arts, one of ten Scottish finalists.

In June 2018, the festival session tent marquee evolved into a second stage.

In July 2019, the organising group became a Scottish Charitable Incorporated Organisation.

In January 2020, the event was rebranded using the shorter name 'Killin Music Fest'.

In March 2020, due to the outbreak of COVID-19 the fifth festival, which was scheduled to take place from 19 to 21 June 2020, was postponed and rescheduled to take place from 18 to 20 June 2021.

In December 2021 the Manran concert scheduled for 30 December was cancelled due to the ongoing COVID-19 restrictions.

In May 2022 the festival announced the renaming of the marquee stage to the Danny Kyle Stage.

=== 2016 ===
The first Killin Music Festival was held from 17 to 19 June 2016. The main stage ran from 18:00 until 01:00 on Friday 17 June, and from 15:30 until 01:00 on Saturday 18 June. The lineup on Sunday 19 June focused on an open stage competition, running from 12:00 until 17:30. Various ancillary events ran across the weekend, including singing and music workshops, gigs in local pubs and bars, and local heritage tours. The event ran in the McLaren Hall, Killin. The festival office was located in an empty shop on the main street of the village. The event was compered by Liz Clark of Celtic Music Radio, who helped organise the Killin Traditional Music and Dance Festival in the mid-1990s.

==== Artists ====
Friday 17 June 2016	Saturday 18 June 2016	Sunday 19 June 2016
Skipinnish	Scott Wood Band	The Deadly Winters
Whisky Kiss	Have Mercy Las Vegas	Callum, Connor & Fergus
Rachel Sermanni	Trail West	Jock the Box & Duncan MacKinnon
Jack McRobbie	Jenn Butterworth & L-B Salter	Tommy Weir
Box o' Bananas	Donald Black Band	Fergus & Lewis Walker
	Friel Sisters	Comrie Pipe Band
	Mischa MacPherson Trio	
	Sarah Hayes	

Notes
1.^{1} The Claire Hastings Band was originally scheduled to perform on the Saturday line-up, but were replaced by Jenn Butterworth & LB Salter when Claire was unable to perform due to laryngitis.

=== 2017 ===
The second Killin Music Festival was held from 16 to 19 June 2017 in Killin, Perthshire. The main stage ran from 18:30 until 01:30 on Friday 16 June, and from 18:00 until 01:30 on Saturday 17 June. The main stage extended in 2017 to include a seated concert on Sunday 19 June, running from 19:00 until 23:00. During the morning of Sunday 19th, a Community Stage event was introduced, focusing on local performers and talent. The open stage competition was relocated to the Killin Hotel. Various other ancillary events ran across the weekend, including singing and music workshops, workouts, pipe band parades, and local heritage talks. The event ran in the McLaren Hall, Killin. The festival office was relocated to the local sports pavilion, and a session tent was introduced located in the pavilion grounds. The event was compered by Liz Clark.

==== Artists ====
Friday 16 June 2017	Saturday 17 June 2017	Sunday 18 June 2017
Manran	Skerryvore	Dougie MacLean
Tide Lines	RURA	Talisk
Jock the Box & Duncan MacKinnon	Heron Valley	Calum MacKenzie Jones
Snuffbox	Top Floor Taivers	DopeSickFly
The Deadly Winters	Callum, Connor & Fergus	McLaren High School Trad Band
		Madam Tsunami
		Sophie Rogers
		McLaren High School Pipe Band
		Killin Community Choir
		Killin Kid's Choir

=== 2018 ===
The third Killin Music Festival was held from 15 to 17 June 2018 in Killin, Perthshire. Early bird tickets went on sale on Monday 19 June 2017 and sold out within 90 minutes. The event was compered by Liz Clark.

==== Artists ====
Friday 15 June 2018	Saturday 16 June 2018	Sunday 17 June 2018
Blazin' Fiddles	Peatbog Faeries	Aly Bain & Phil Cunningham
Niteworks	Mec Lir	Kim Carnie
Tannara	Ho-ro	The 101
Van Susans	Katee Kross & The Amberjacks	Abi & Katie
Suas	Calum MacKenzie Jones & The Trad Project	The Canny Band
The Camans	The Coaltown Daisies	Lisa Kowalski
	The Mocking Dogs	Eriska
		Dlu
		Strachan
		McLaren High School Pipe Band
		McLaren High School Trad Band
		Killin Community Choir
		Killin Kid's Choir

=== 2019 ===
The fourth Killin Music Festival was held from 14 to 16 June 2019 in Killin, Perthshire. The event was compered by Paddy Callaghan.

==== Artists ====
Friday 14 June 2019	Saturday 15 June 2019	Sunday 16 June 2019
Trail West	Elephant Sessions	Siobhan Miller
Tom McGuire & The Brassholes	Kinnaris Quintet	Ryan Young
Blue Rose Code	Torridon	The No Marcs
Beinn Lee	Gnoss	Man of the Minch
Eabhal	The 101	Kara Conway
Dlu	Headland	Two Far Flung
	Greig Taylor Blues Combo	Calum Bowie
		Anna Leyden
		Patrick Baldwin
		Doune Pipe Band
		Killin Community Choir
		Killin Kid's Choir

=== 2020–21 ===
Killin Music Fest was scheduled to take place from 19 to 21 June 2020 in Killin, Perthshire. Due to the outbreak of COVID-19 the event was postponed and rescheduled to take place from 18 to 20 June 2021. Due to ongoing COVID-19 restrictions the event was again postponed in 2021 and rescheduled to take place from 17 to 29 June 2022.

=== 2022 ===
The fifth Killin Music Fest took place from 17 to 19 June 2022 in Killin, Perthshire. The event was compered by Paddy Callaghan.

==== Artists ====
Friday 17 June 2022	Saturday 18 June 2022	Sunday 19 June 2022
Mànran	Skerryvore	Karen Matheson
Dàimh	Fara	Heisk
Man of the Minch	Trip	Amy Papiransky
Rock Choir	Cammy Barnes	Killin Community Choir
Red Hearted Vibrations	Amy Baillie	Maria McAveety
	Cody Feechan	Paddy Callaghan
	The No Marcs	Doune Pipe Band
	Fèis Fhoirt	

=== 2023 ===
The sixth Killin Music Fest took place from 16 to 18 June 2023 in Killin, Perthshire. The event was compered by Paddy Callaghan.

==== Artists ====
Friday 16 June 2023	Saturday 17 June 2023	Sunday 18 June 2023
Face the West	Ross Ainslie & Ali Hutton Band	Norrie MacIver Band
Dallahan	Raintown	Gwilym Bowen Rhys
Josie Duncan	Kirsten Adamson	Ellie Beaton
St Roch's Ceili Band	Redfox	Unity Irish Dance
Maria McAveety	Rock Choir	Moonlight Zoo
Lori	The Hanging Bandits	Chris Scott
	The BKs	No Marcs
	Midlife Crisis	Sgiobalta
		Aberfeldy Gaelic Choir
		Killin Community Choir
		Doune Pipe Band
		Fèis Fhoirt

=== 2024-2025 ===
The festival took a planned break in 2024 and 2025 to allow its voluntary organising team time to regroup following a successful 2023.

=== 2026 ===
The seventh Killin Music Fest is scheduled to take place from 20 to 21 June 2026 in Killin, Perthshire.

==== Artists ====
Saturday 20 June 2026	Sunday 21 June 2026
Cammy Barnes	Aberfeldy Gaelic Choir
Copper Lungs	Doune Pipe Band
Project Smok
The Mad Ferret Band
Ruairidh Gray
Beth Malcolm

=== Open Stage Competition ===
From 2016 to 2019 the festival ran an open stage competition during the weekend where five artists or groups are selected from applicants, with one winner being judged by an industry expert. The winner was presented with an Open Stage Winner trophy and is invited to play on the main stage at the following years festival.

Year	Winner(s)	Venue
2016	The Deadly Winters, and Calum, Connor & Fergus (Draw)	McLaren Hall, Killin
2017	Calum MacKenzie Jones	Killin Hotel, Killin
2018	Abi & Katie	Portnellan Tent, Killin
2019	Man of the Minch	Portnellan Tent, Killin

=== Col Charles Stewart Quaich ===
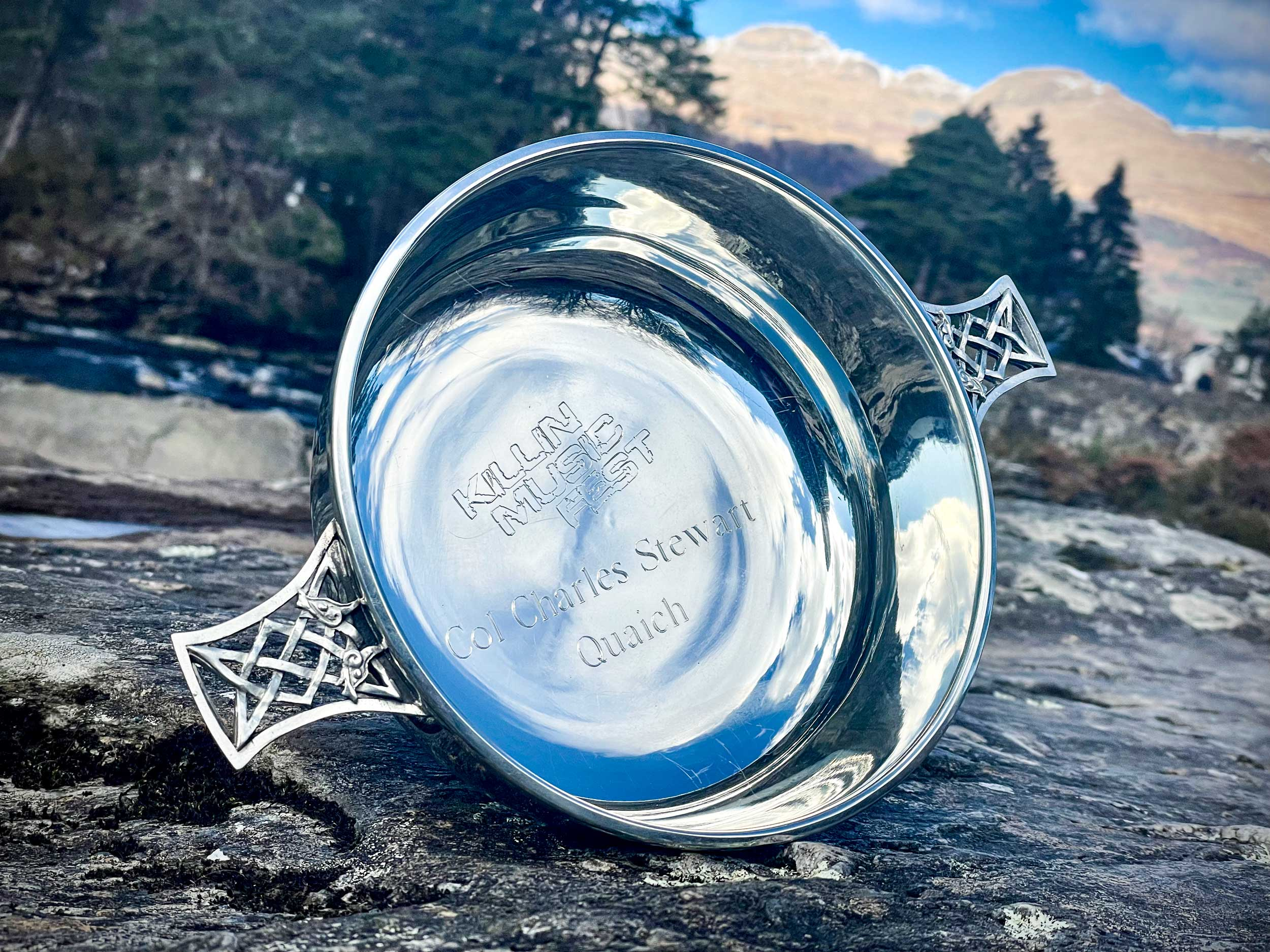
Col Charles Stewart Quaich, photographed at the Falls of Dochart, Killin, March 2022.

In 2022 the festival introduced a competition to award the new Col Charles Stewart Quaich. The competition accepts any performance of music, poetry or stories, which celebrate the local area of Killin and Perthshire, and is inspired by Killin's heritage in traditional Scottish music, in particular, Stewart's ‘The Killin Collection’.

Col Charles Stewart (1823-1894) was a prominent figure in Killin and Perthshire, and helped to preserve and promote local history, folklore, language and music. Among his many achievements Stewart was Chief of the Perth Gaelic Society, Director of the Killin Railway, head of Killin Gaelic Choir and was a respected historian and translator of historic Gaelic manuscripts. Born in Glen Lyon, Stewart spent the greater part of his life in Killin at Tigh’n Duin (the now demolished youth hostel). His legacy ‘The Killin Collection of Gaelic songs’ comprises Gaelic songs and tunes of the local area from the 18th century.

Year	Winner(s)	Winning entry
2022	Archie Finlay	Loch Tay Boat Song
2023	Struan McNaughton, Andrew McHendry, Reyss Frost, Declan Barker, Arran Campbell and Archie Finlay	Rattlin' Rollin' Willie

== Other events ==
The group have also organised other events alongside the summer festival weekend.

Date	Event	Support artists
19 March 2016	Warm Up Gig	Siobhan Anderson; Jack McRobbie; Duncan MacKinnon; Willie Chisholm; Laura Wilkie; Alpine Road; Tommy Weir
12 November 2016	Drams Ceilidh Band	
30 December 2016	Skipinnish Live! in Killin	Archie McAllister
1 April 2017	Local Music Showcase	Killin Community Choir; Duncan MacKinnon; Seona Hay; Tommy Weir; McLaren Trad Group; Sgallachd; Siobhan Anderson and Jack McRobbie
30 December 2017	Skipinnish Live! in Killin	Archie McAllister
7 April 2018	Spring Concert	Local young musicians taught by Marc Fallon; Killin Community Choir led by Frances Morrison Allen and accompanied by Jacco Lamfers; McLaren High School Traditional Music Group; Charlotte Kane; The Mocking Dogs; Duncan MacKinnon; Thomas Kane; Siobhan Anderson and Jennifer Austin
18 August 2018	Headland Live! at Killin Show	
30 December 2018	Skipinnish Live! in Killin	Archie McAllister
23 March 2019	Heron Valley	The Canny Band
20 December 2019	Skerryvore Live! in Killin	
30 December 2022	Talisk	Jeff Jeffrey

== History ==
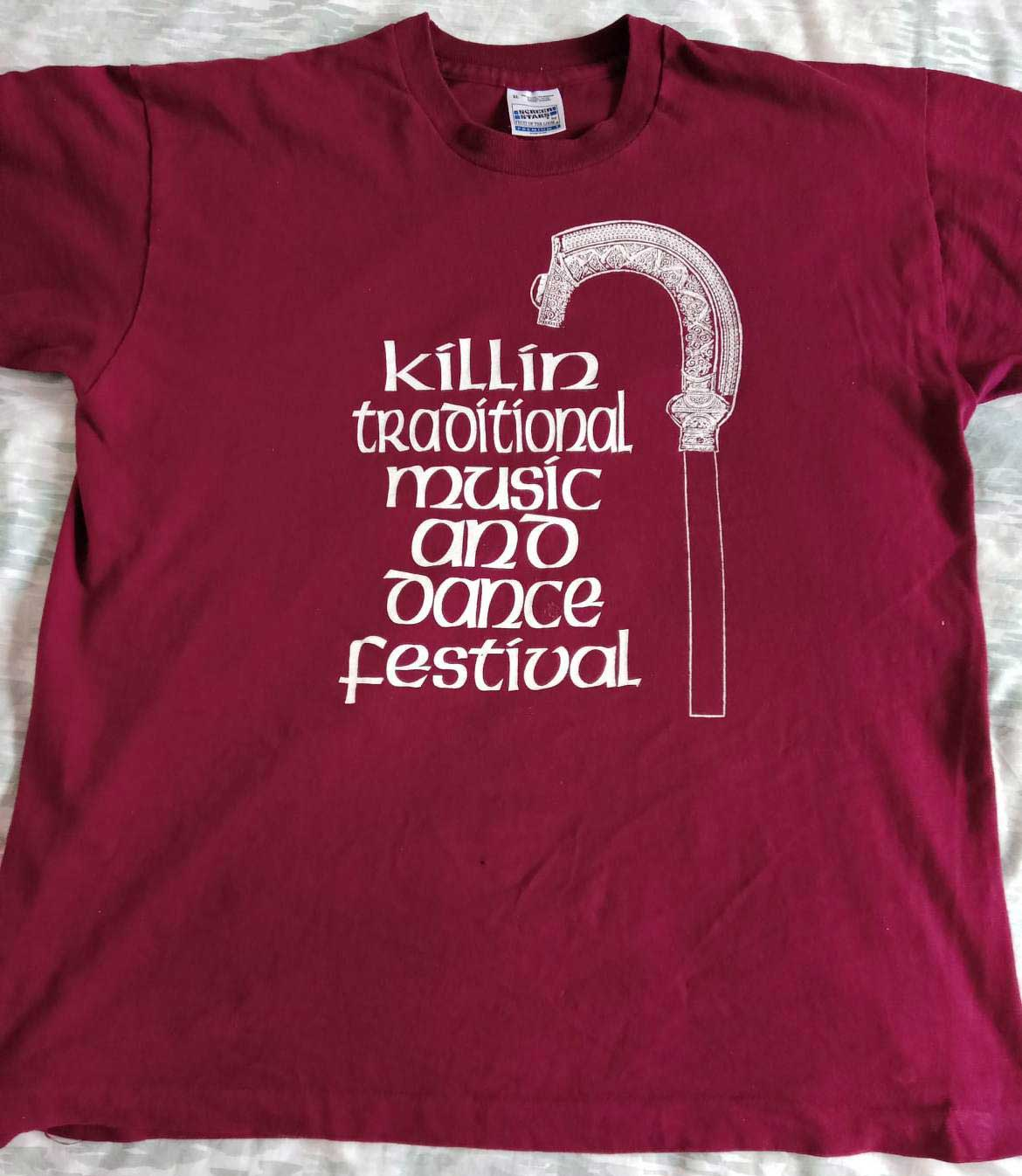
An original t-shirt from the Killin Folk Festival

=== Killin Traditional Music and Dance Festival 1995 – 2003 ===
The Killin Traditional Music and Dance Festival, also known as Killin Folk Festival, ran for nine festivals from 1995 until 2003.

Danny Kyle served as festival director for the first four festivals, from 1995 through 1998, until his passing on 7 July 1998. The first event in 1995 was organised by Killin and District Traders' Association in conjunction with Danger Inc - Danny Kyle and Gerry Chambers, Celtic Music Consultants.

In October 1996 the Killin and District Traders Association was re-organised under a new entity named "The Killin Initiative". The new group oversaw the organisation of the annual Killin Traditional Music and Dance Festival and Killin Highland Games events.
