= Isla Callister =

Manx folk musician and fiddle player

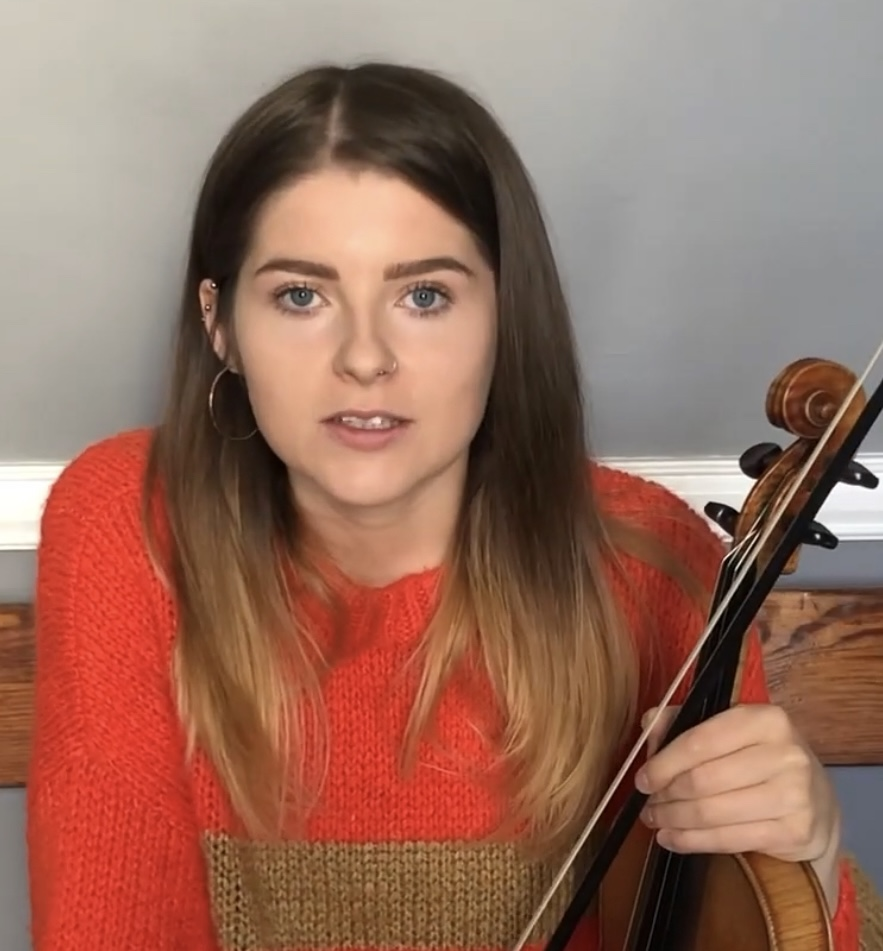
- Callister in 2020

Background information
- Genre: Folk
- Occupation: Musician
- Instrument: Fiddle
- Member of: Heisk; Trip
- Website: islacallister.com

Isla Callister is a folk musician and fiddle player from the Isle of Man. She is a member of the all-women folk group Heisk, and the band Trip. She performed with both ensembles at Celtic Connections in 2024. Trip were nominated for the BBC Folk Awards Young Folk Award in 2018.

In 2023, to celebrate International Women's Day, Culture Vannin released a composition by Callister which celebrated the roles of women in Manx history.

Callister is from Peel, and is a Gaelic speaker. From 2016 she studied at the Royal Conservatoire of Scotland for a degree in traditional music.
