= Moirlanich Longhouse =

Coordinates: 56.4774°N 4.3361°W

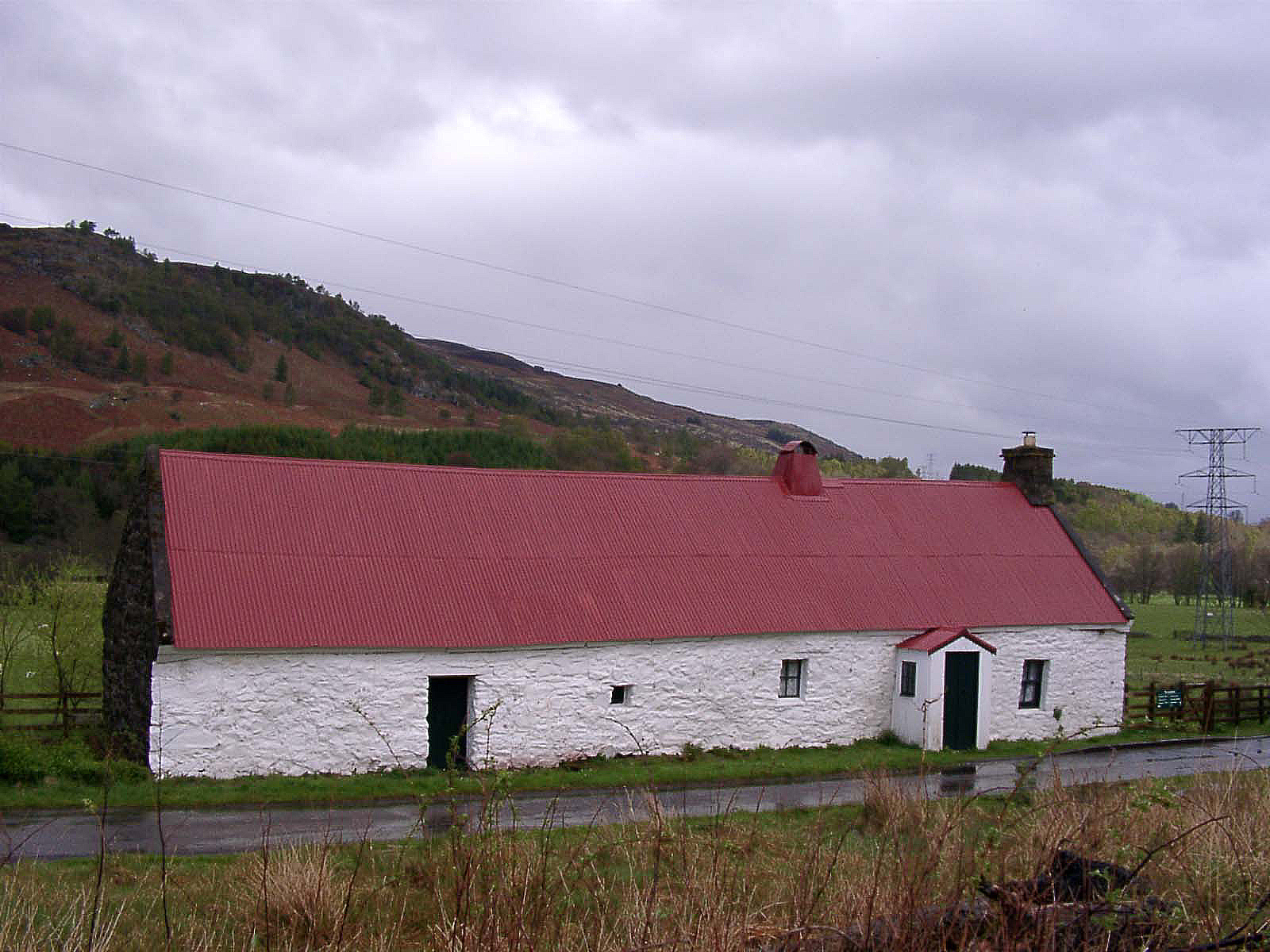

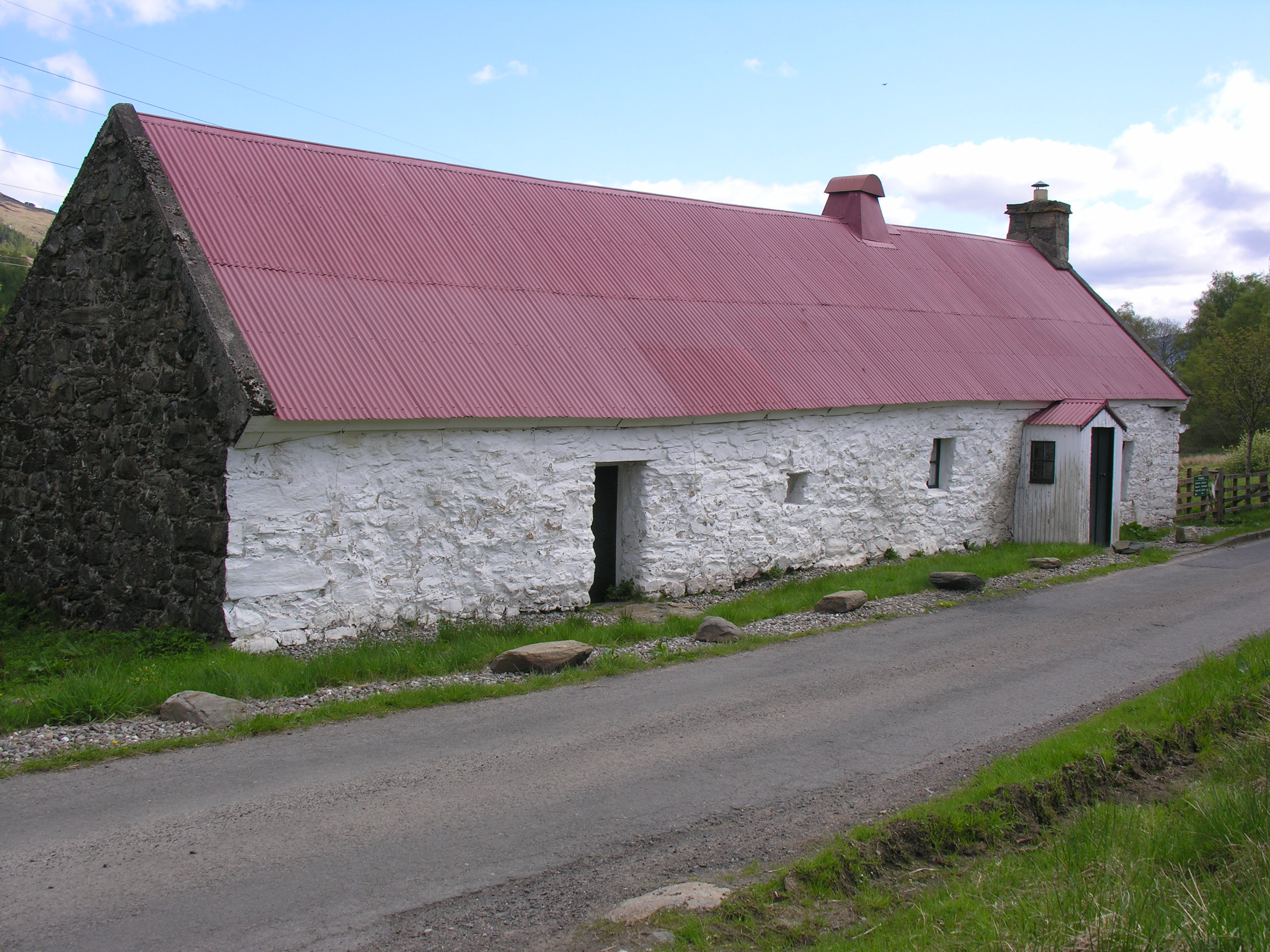

Moirlanich Longhouse is a rare example of a cruck frame Scottish cottage. It is located at grid reference NN562341 in Glen Lochay near Killin in the Stirling council area, Scotland.

Removal of the corrugated roof during a renovation revealed the remains of the original thatched roof and analysis of this has added significantly to knowledge of thatching in Scotland.

It was purchased by the National Trust for Scotland in 1992 and is open to visitors from May to September.

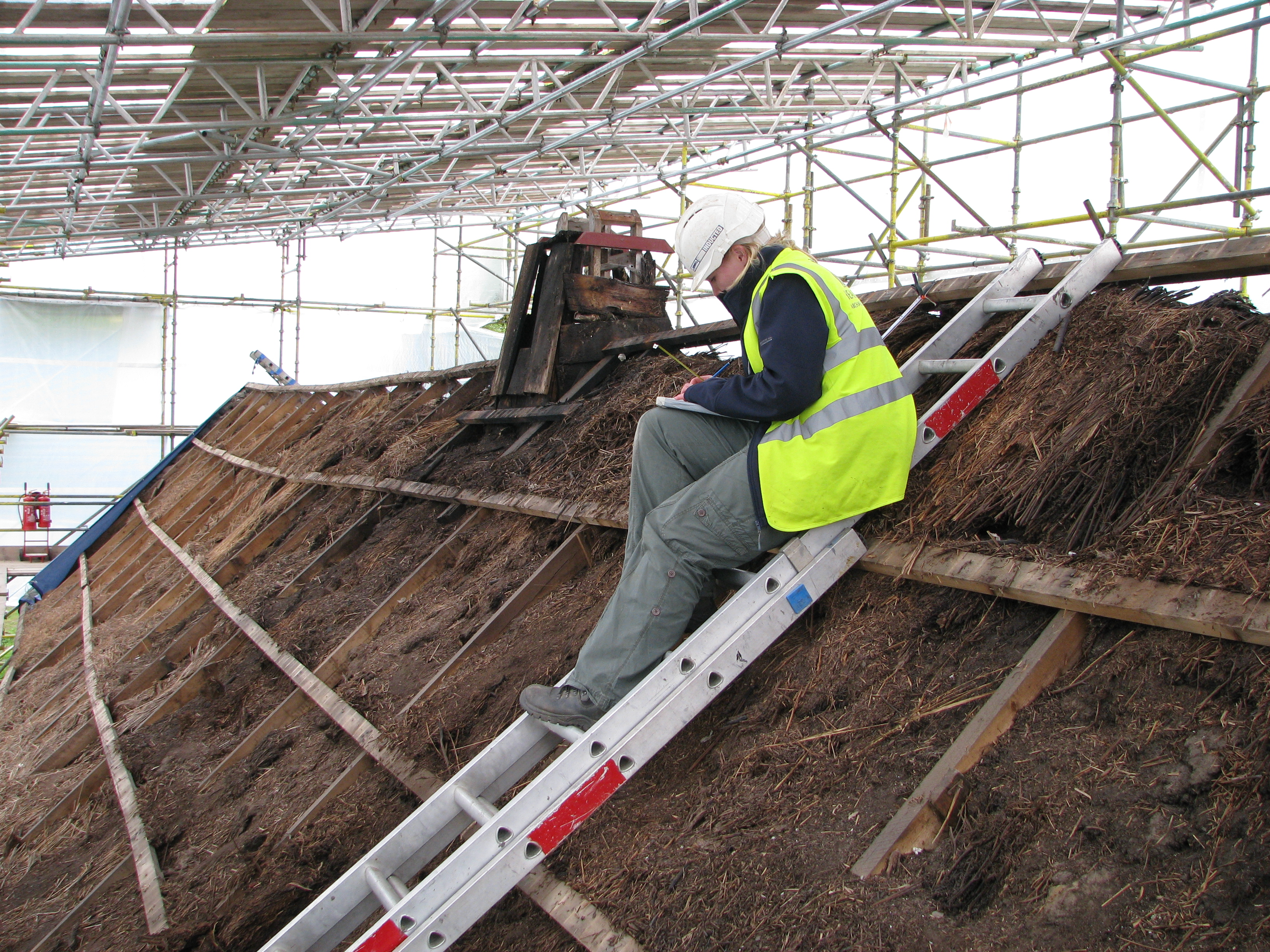
Excavation of the thatch at Moirlanich Longhouse

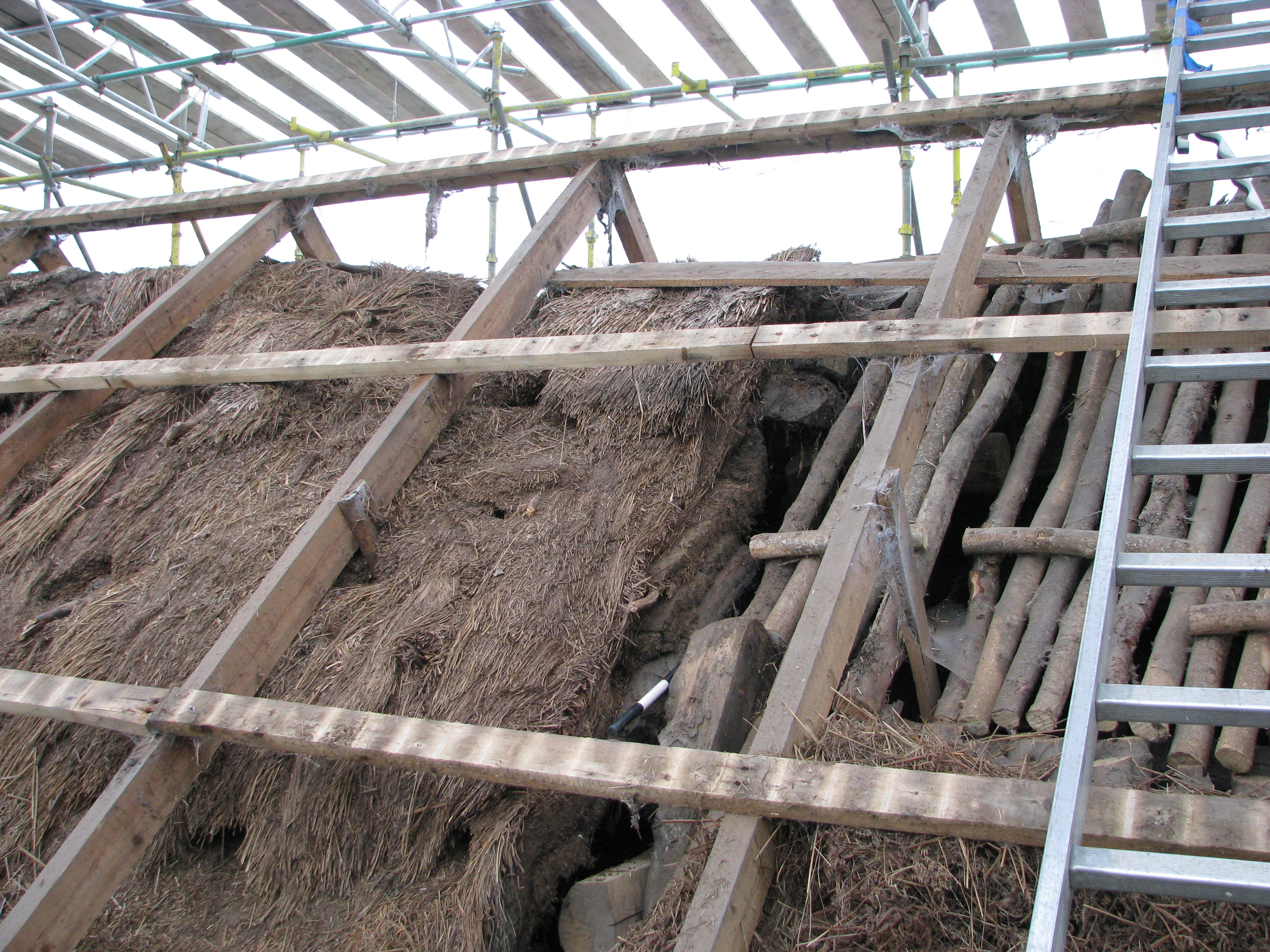
Excavated section through the Moirlanich Longhouse roof
