= Blackhouse =

Traditional type of house in the UK

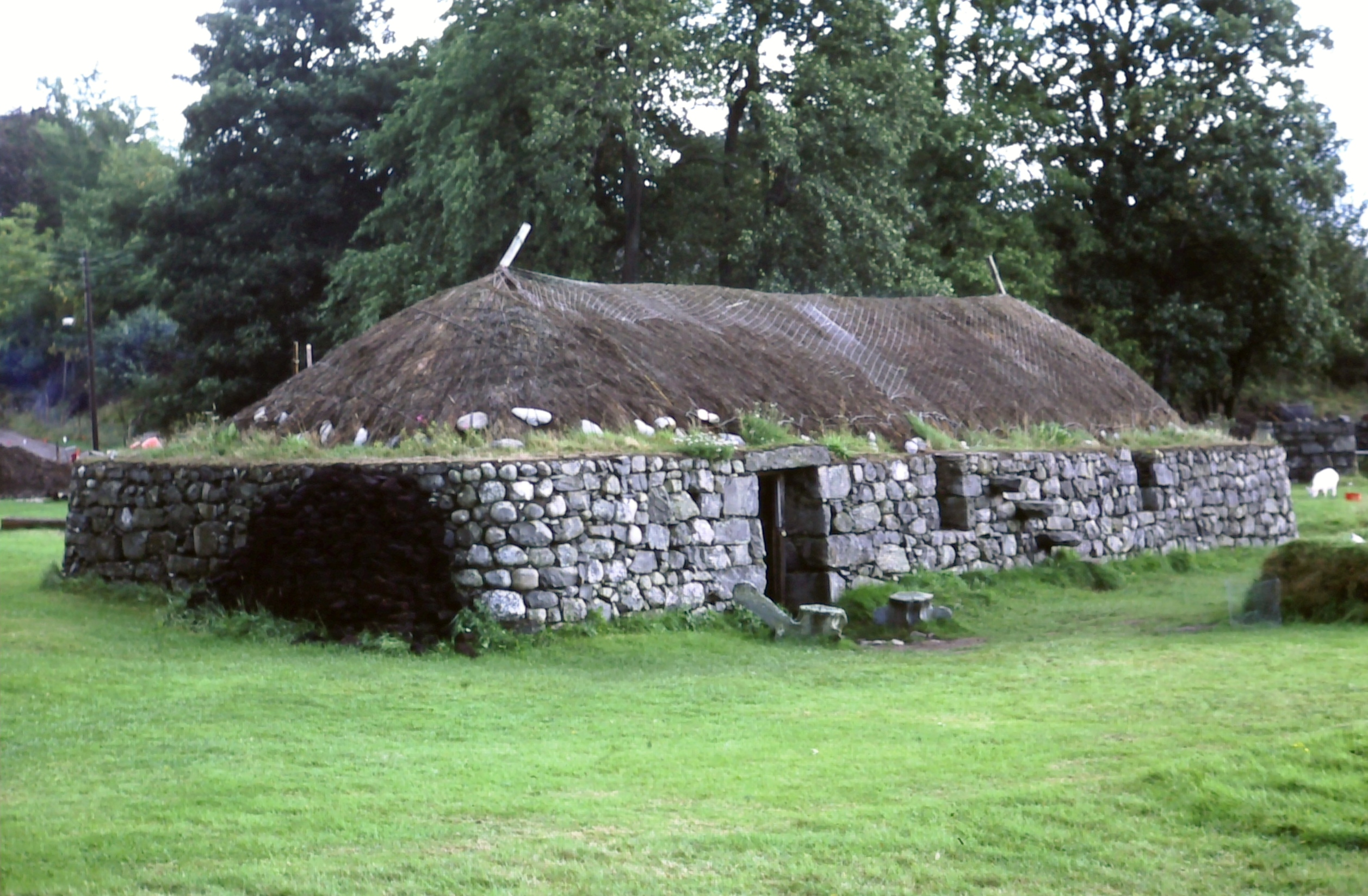
Reconstructed blackhouse, Highland Folk Museum

A blackhouse (Irish: teach dubh [ˌtʲax ˈd̪ˠʊw]; Scottish Gaelic: t(a)igh-dubh [t̪ʰə ˈt̪uh]) is a traditional type of house which used to be common in Ireland, the Hebrides, and the Scottish Highlands.

== Origin of the name ==
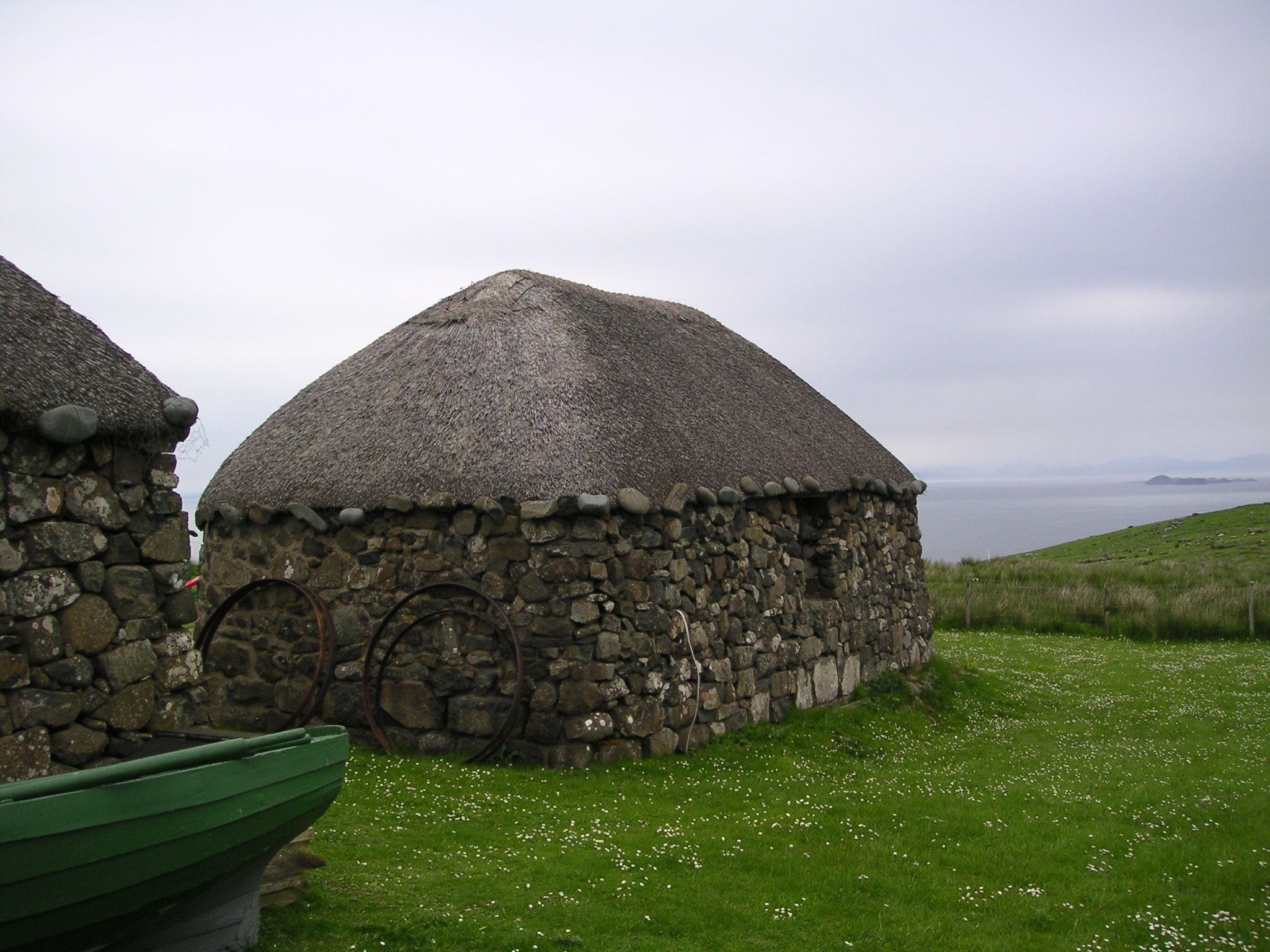
Restored blackhouse in a museum on Trotternish, Skye

The origin of the name blackhouse is of some debate. On the Isle of Lewis, in particular, it seems to have been used to distinguish the older blackhouses from some of the newer white-houses (Irish: teach bán [ˌtʲax ˈbˠaːnˠ], teach geal [ˌtʲax ˈɟalˠ]; Scottish Gaelic: taigh-geal [t̪ʰə ˈkʲal̪ˠ]), with their harled (rendered) stone walls. There may also be some confusion arising from the phonetic similarity between the dubh, meaning black, and tughadh, meaning thatch.

== Description ==
The buildings were generally built with double wall dry-stone walls packed with earth, and were roofed with wooden rafters covered with a thatch of turf with cereal straw or reed. The floor was generally flagstones or packed earth and there was a central hearth for the fire. There was no chimney for the smoke to escape through. Instead the smoke made its way through the roof. This led to the soot blackening of the interior which may also have contributed to the adoption of the name blackhouse.

The blackhouse was used to accommodate livestock as well as people. People lived at one end and the animals lived at the other with a partition between them.

== Lewis blackhouse ==
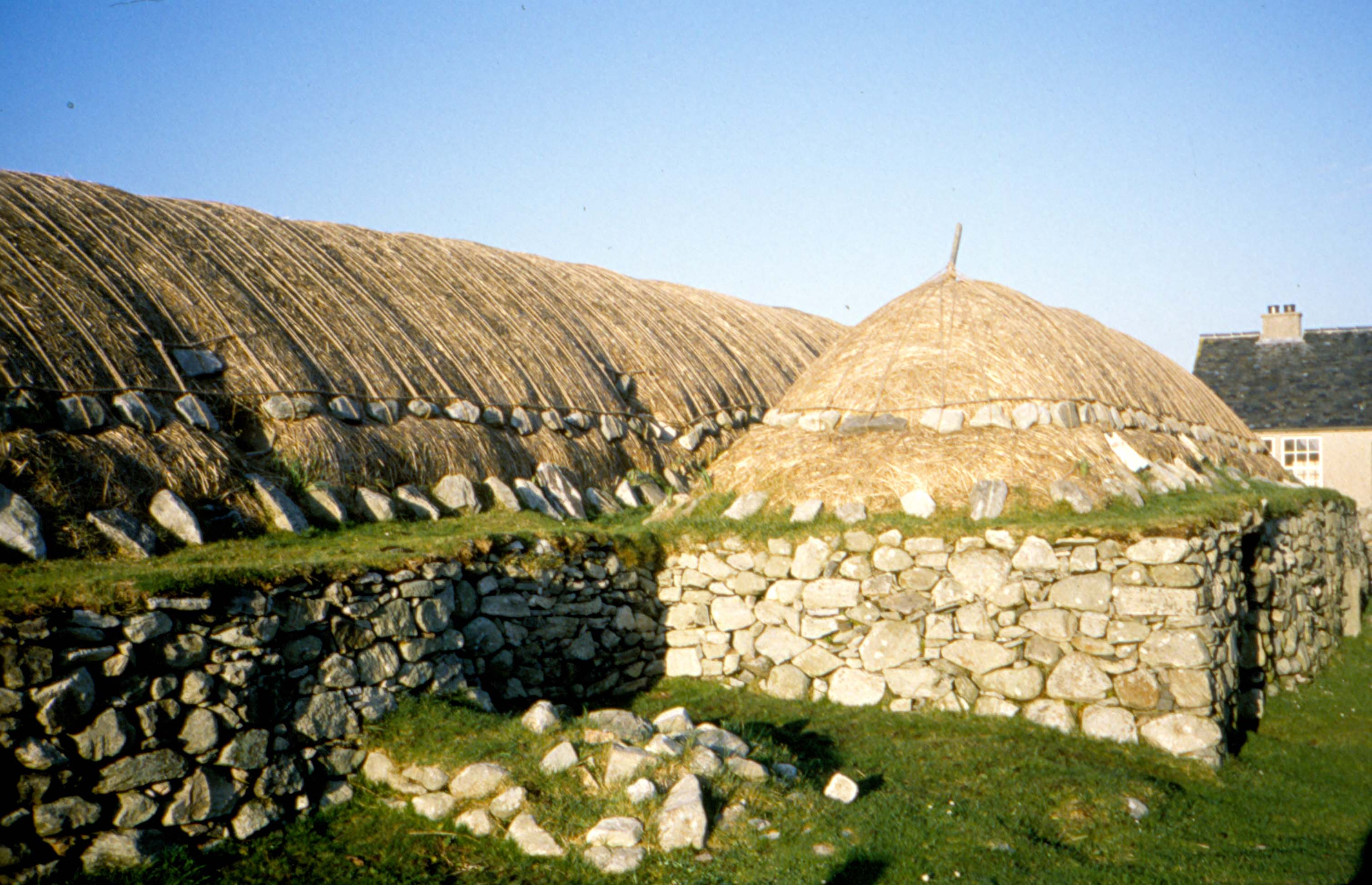
The Blackhouse Museum, Arnol

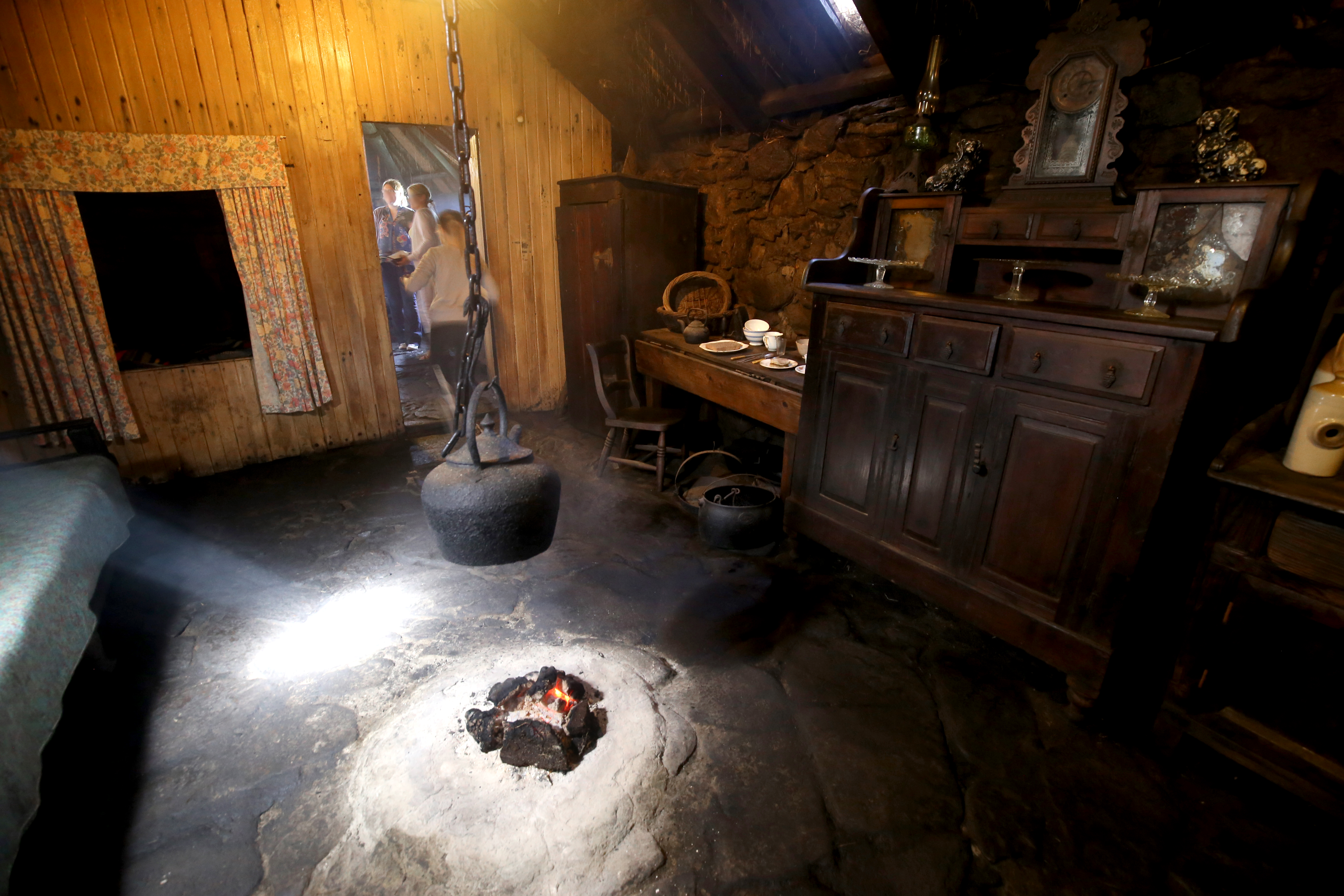
The Blackhouse Arnol interior, Arnol

Although the Lewis blackhouses have a look of real antiquity, most of the upstanding ruins were built less than 150 years ago. Many were still roofed until the 1970s but without the necessary annual repairs deteriorated rapidly; as people moved into more modern dwellings with indoor plumbing and better heating, most have fallen into ruin. However, blackhouses are increasingly being restored, especially for use as holiday accommodation.

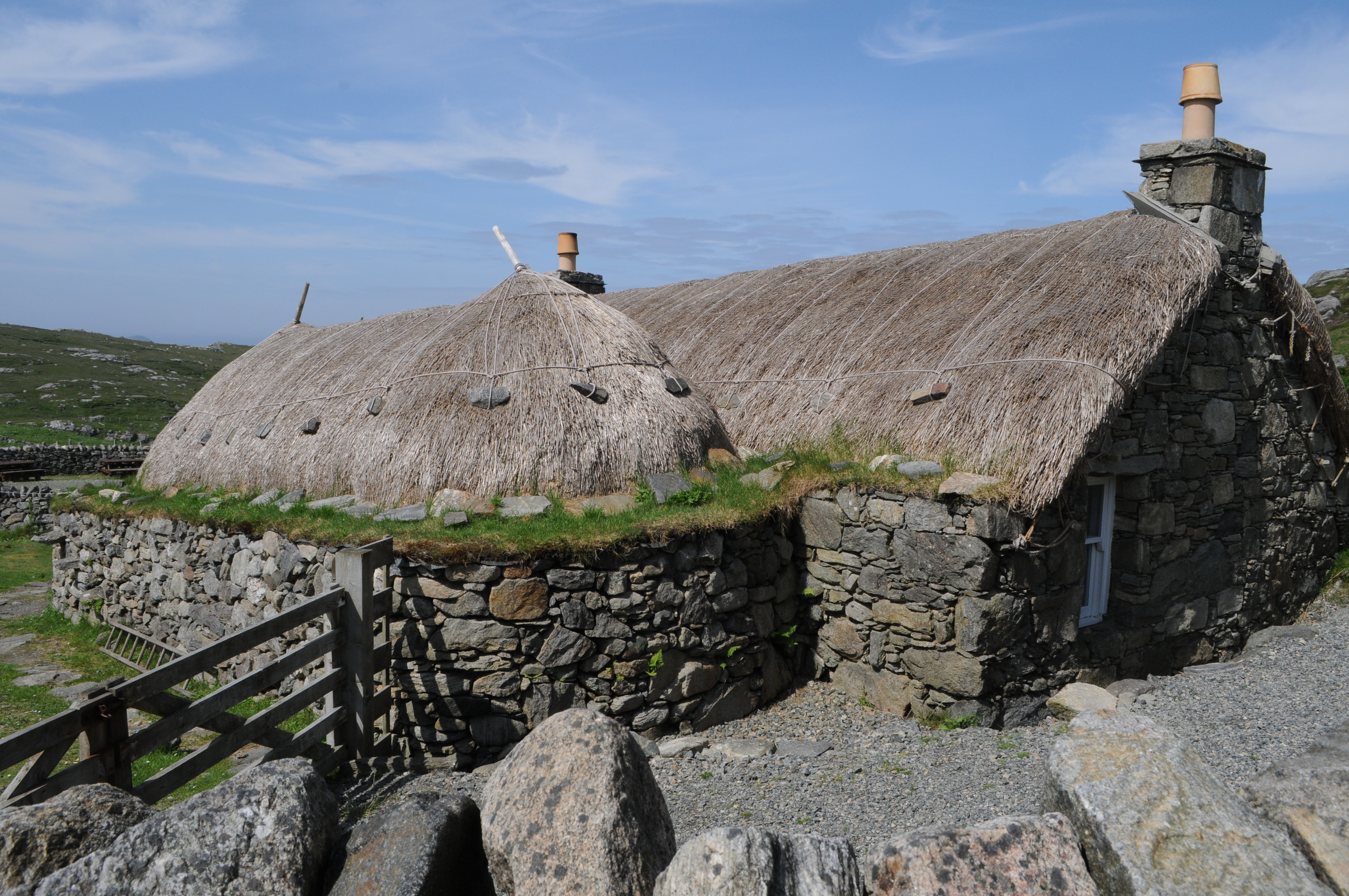
The Gearrannan Blackhouse Village in Garenin is an example of blackhouses being converted into holiday accommodation.

The blackhouses on Lewis have roofs thatched with cereal straw over turf and thick, stone-lined walls with an earthen core. Roof timbers rise from the inner face of the walls providing a characteristic ledge at the wall head (tobhta). This gives access to the roof for thatching. Both the animals and occupants shared the same door, living at different ends of the same space. Several long ranges, or rooms, were usually built alongside each other, each one having its own ridgeline, giving them the very distinctive look of the Lewis blackhouse.

The immediate origins of the blackhouse are unclear, as few pre-eighteenth century examples have ever been excavated. One reason for this is that, unlike their later counterparts, the early examples may have been made of turf and thatch and quickly returned to the earth once abandoned. As one of the most primitive forms of the North Atlantic longhouse tradition, it is very probable that the roots of the blackhouse, in which cattle and humans shared the same roof, is well over 1000 years old. The Lewis examples have clearly been modified to survive in the tough environment of the Outer Hebrides. Low rounded roofs, elaborately roped, were developed to resist the strong Atlantic winds, and walls were made thick to provide insulation and support the sideways forces of the short driftwood roof timbers.

== See also ==
- Architecture in early modern Scotland#Vernacular architecture (section)
- But and ben
- Croft (land)
- Crofting
- Icelandic turf house
- Scottish Vernacular
- Vernacular architecture
