= Verreville Glass and Pottery Works, Glasgow =

Factory in Glasgow, Scotland

Verreville Glassworks was established on the north bank of the River Clyde in the village of Finnieston in 1777. Glass making was discontinued in 1842. The buildings of the works, including the 120 feet high glasshouse cone, were converted into a pottery works which remained in production until 1918.

In addition to a rich historical and documentary archive, evidence for the operations and technology of these industries was gained from excavations in 2005. The archaeological excavation, carried out by Headland Archaeology uncovered several buildings and structures relating to both the glass and the pottery works.

== Historical background ==
The Verreville Glassworks was established by a group of Glasgow merchants in 1777. Workmen were brought from England and Germany to build the cone, a major Glasgow landmark of its day, which reached a height of 120 feet. The company amalgamated with the Glasgow Bottlework Company in c. 1786 and in 1806 the business was sold to the Dumbarton Glass Company. The new business was immediately sold to John Geddes, on the condition that he did not make window glass or bottles.

John Geddes founded the ‘Glasgow and Verreville Glass and Pottery Company’, which quickly established itself and developed an export trade to North America and Ireland. However, pottery production was a very competitive market and Geddes was soon declared bankrupt. In 1830 the pottery was taken over by Robert Montgomery, a former manager. Montgomery’s involvement with the pottery was short-lived and by 1833 he too was declared bankrupt. The glassworks were closed in 1834.

The glassworks and John Geddes’ house and grounds (Verreville House) were bought by Robert Alexander Kidston who was a partner in the nearby Anderston Pottery (often called Lancefield Pottery). By this time the pottery had two earthenware kilns and one china kiln. Kidston tried to raise the quality of the products - he added the production of porcelain, imported Staffordshire workers and extended the works into the grounds of Verreville House – but by 1841 he himself was in financial trouble and the firm was taken over by a consortium, one of whom was Robert Cochran, whose family later owned the much larger Britannia Pottery in Glasgow. Glassmaking appears to have ceased production in 1842 and a number of small pottery kilns were built inside the original glassworks cone. Only white and earthenwares were being made by this time. The Cochran family remained in charge of the pottery until its eventual closure in 1918.

== Archaeological Excavations ==
The Headland excavations in 2005 revealed several features related to three major phases of development: glass manufacturing activity (c. 1777 – mid-1840s), pottery manufacturing phase (late 1840s – c. 1859) and the later pottery works (after c. 1859 – c. 1918).

=== Glass Manufacturing Activity ===
The Glassworking Cone

The earliest phase of activity identified on site was associated with the production of glass. Evidence for the glass cone structure was identified by four evenly spaced brick built piers. These were constructed of hand made red bricks and formed a half circle in plan. It is probable that this is the remains of the northern half of the original octagonal glass cone structure built in 1777. These piers possibly supported an arcaded external wall, allowing access to the interior of the glass cone. Leading into the central area of the ‘glass cone’ was a series of flues. The largest was constructed of hand made red brick with a vaulted ceiling. The interior of the brick was blackened by soot and the floor was blackened natural sand, which contained a large quaintly of broken glass or cullet. These flues would have pulled cold air into a central (unidentified) glass furnace, obliterated by the post-1920s buildings.

The Glassworking Hovel

The sub square building (hovel), which housed the glass cone was only identified by one wall during the excavation. Two lengths of hand made red brick wall, interpreted as the original northern wall of the hovel were excavated. Truncated by later stone pillar bases the fragmentary walls were upstanding to a height of approximately 2 m. The western wall fragment had a remains of a double archway – possibly an original entrance into the glass cone.

The Fritting Floors

Two glass working ‘floor’ structures were identified. The northern structure was constructed of yellow refractory bricks with single coarse brick walls spaced at regular intervals. The floor base was vitrified with a thick layer of melted glass covering it. The southern structure appeared to be of a similar construction although was heavily truncated. These structures have been initially interpreted as possible fritting (or melting) floors for the primary production of melted glass.

=== Pottery Manufacturing Activity ===
Yard Area

A heavily compacted surface of crushed flint covered the eastern area of the site. Several parts of the surface had been repaired by rounded cobbles and obvious areas of wear, including possible cart ruts, were apparent.

Pottery Buildings

Five buildings associated with pottery manufacture were identified during the excavation including a pottery drying room, workshops and furnaces. These all appeared to date from the expansion of the pottery works c. 1820.

The Kilns

Six brick built kilns were identified during the course of the excavations. All were fragmentary and truncated by both the modern buildings and later 19th century buildings. All that survived of each was the partial remains of circular structures forming the base of the pottery-firing kiln. A number of rectangular ash pits, evenly spaced along the edges of the main kiln bases, were identified with each kiln. These contained ash and kiln furniture and were used to collect the burnt material falling from the fires above. Surrounding each of the kilns were cobbled floors, which sloped downward to the external edges of the ash pits – to allow easy emptying of the content of the ash pits.

Three kilns were situated within the probable location of the large circular glass cone, built in c. 1777. Historical reference note that after the glass cone went out of use (c. 1840) a number of small pottery kilns were built within it, reusing the glass cone building to house them.

=== The Later Pottery works ===
During the final 50 years of production existing buildings were adapted to new functions and new technology. Steam power was by now incorporated within the factory.

The archaeological evidence for the final phase of Verreville Pottery factory offers glimpses into the complex operations of pottery manufacturing such as processing, constructing, drying and firing of vessels. Clay would arrive into the area via a short gauge rail line in the warehouse. It would then be mixed by paddles in water (blunging), placed into tanks and put into the slip drying room to evaporate off the water. After this the clay would be thrown (wedged) to remove air bubbles and moulded or slip cast before placing into the pot drying room and finally into the kilns for firing.

Archaeological remains included a slip drying oven, a tunnel furnace and a pot drying room as well as evidence for modifications to the warehouse, courtyard area and workshop and the removal of the rectangular oven.

== See also ==
- Glass production
- Pottery
- Industrial archaeology

== Notes and references ==
- The word Verreville means glasstown
- Coleman, R (2005 ) '133-139 Finnieston Street, Glasgow City (Glasgow parish), 18th/19th-century glass and pottery works', Discovery and Excavation in Scotland, 6, 2005, 74-75,
- Cossons, N. 1987, The BP Book of Industrial Archaeology, 2nd revised edition, Newton Abbott: David & Charles Publishers.
- Fleming, J.A. 1923, Scottish Pottery, Glasgow: Maclehose, Jackson & Co.
- Haggarty, G 2007 ‘Verreville Pottery Glasgow Ceramic Resource Disc’, Northern Ceramic Society 23, 166.
- Hume, J.R. 1974, Industrial Archaeology of Glasgow, Glasgow: Blackie & Son.
- Kelly, H.E. & McAslan, R. 2005, ‘Sherds from Verreville Pottery, Glasgow c 1820 to c. 1840’, Scott Pottery Hist Rev 23.
- Quail, G. 1984a, ‘The Verreville Pottery: Geddes & The Montgomery Periods’, Scott Pottery Hist Rev 8, 44-55.
