= Arnol =

Coordinates: 58.344°N 6.596°W

Arnol: Scottish Gaelic: Àrnol
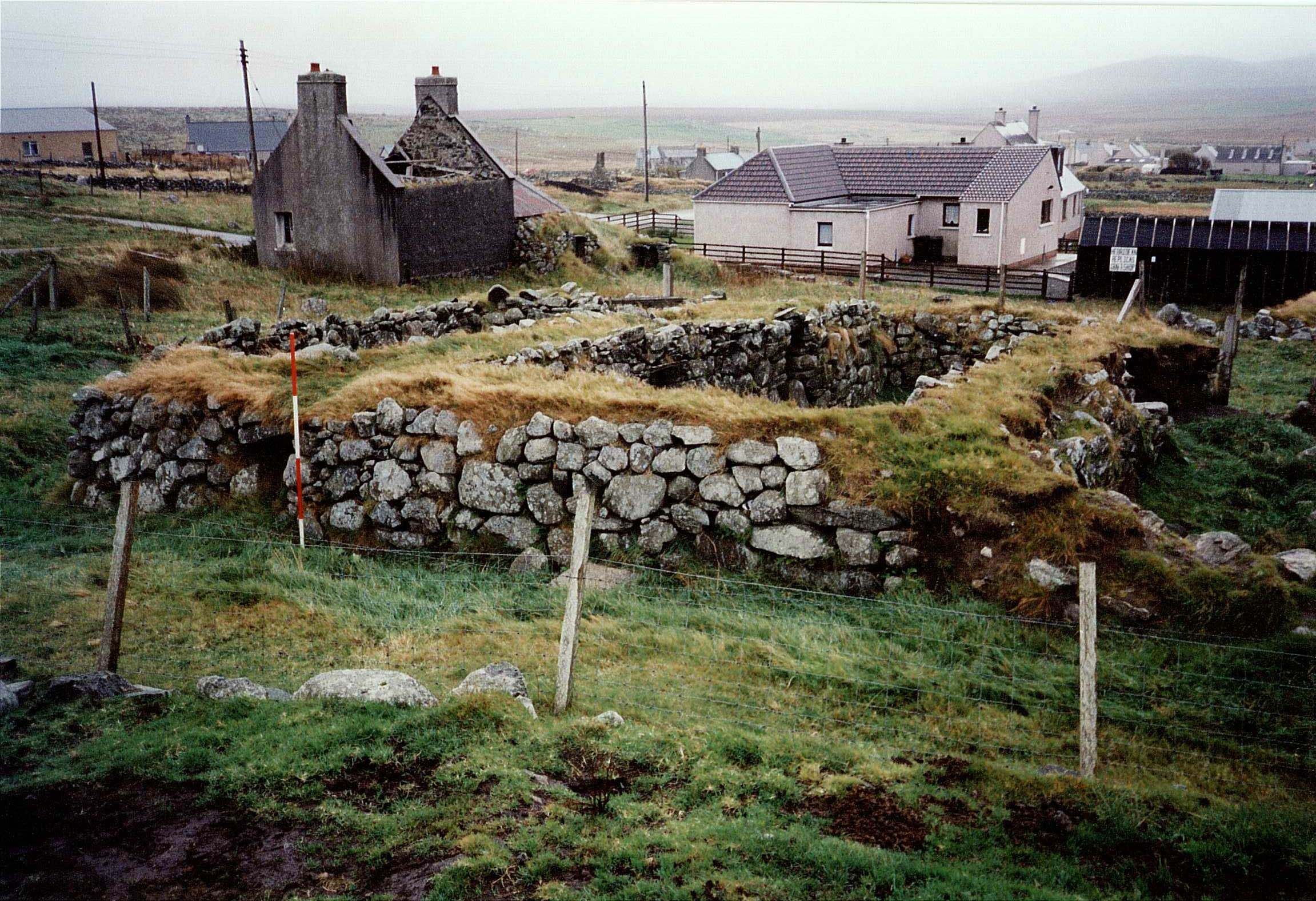
- A typical abandoned blackhouse from Arnol

- Location within the Outer Hebrides
- Language: Scottish Gaelic; English
- OS grid reference: NB311486
- Civil parish: Barvas
- Council area: Na h-Eileanan Siar
- Lieutenancy area: Western Isles
- Country: Scotland
- Sovereign state: United Kingdom
- Post town: ISLE OF LEWIS
- Postcode district: HS2
- Dialling code: 01851
- Police: Scotland
- Fire: Scottish
- Ambulance: Scottish
- UK Parliament: Na h-Eileanan an Iar
- Scottish Parliament: Na h-Eileanan an Iar

Arnol (Scottish Gaelic: Àrnol) is a small village typical of many settlements of the west coast of the Isle of Lewis, in the Outer Hebrides, Scotland. Arnol is within the parish of Barvas, and is situated on the A858.

Once a thriving township with over forty crofts, it now has a population of about 100 and supports a much lower number of active crofters. It is the location of the Blackhouse Museum, owned by Historic Environment Scotland.

== History ==
The township of Arnol has been moved at least three times in the last two hundred years with materials for buildings being robbed and re-used from earlier structures. The early 19th century settlement was actually on the coast but later it was moved inland, closer to the main road. Few of the surviving buildings were lived in for more than 50 years and during that time many were considerably modified, extended and partially rebuilt.

== The Arnol blackhouses ==
Through the village the ruins of blackhouses can be seen everywhere. Very few are still roofed but their massive stone walls and ‘organic’ lines are very characteristic. The older ones have rounded ends and appear as a series of conjoined cells typically with a central living area/byre with a porch and barn on either side. The later ones can be identified by their gabled end walls and the presence of a stone dividing wall between living area and byre.

The museum at No. 42 is probably the best example of a blackhouse on Lewis having been in state care since the occupants moved out in the 1960s. The building, complete with internal fittings, gives a very good impression of what it would have been like to live in a blackhouse. The central hearth is always kept lit and is essential to keep the roof dry and in good condition.

The visitor centre also includes the ruined blackhouse over the road at No. 39. This is one of the few blackhouses on Lewis that have been investigated archaeologically. The excavation by Headland Archaeology revealed successive phases of occupation as the building was modified during the last century as estate owners tried to improve living standards. The earliest levels identified an open central hearth with no clear division between the living area and the byre. In later phases, floors were cobbled or flagged and a step was built to separate the areas occupied by humans and animals. The living area was leveled, probably to accommodate box beds and other furniture. Before the roof collapsed the building was used as a weaving shed as evidenced by the presence of a stone-built platform in the central room.

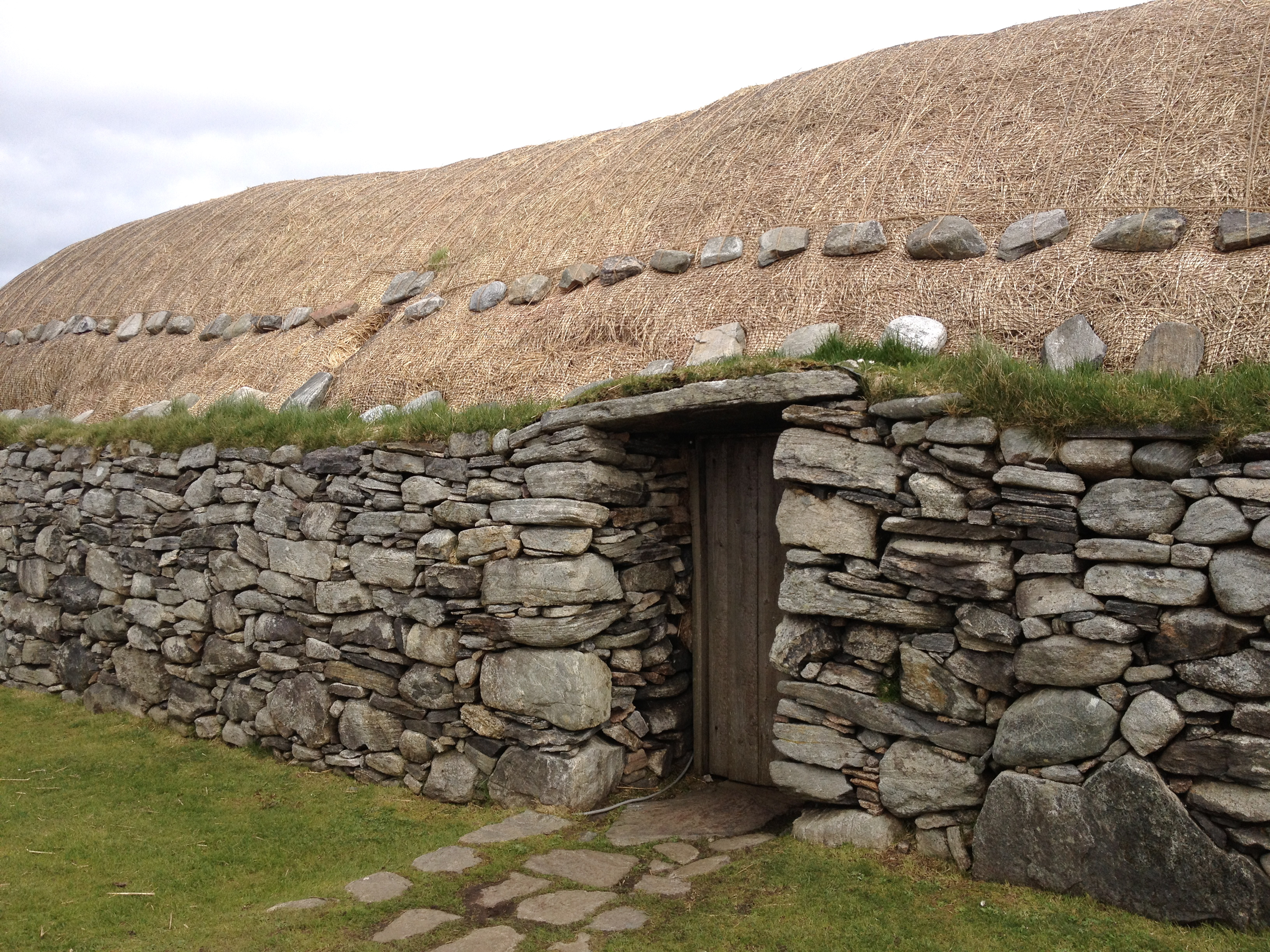
Black House, 42 Arnol

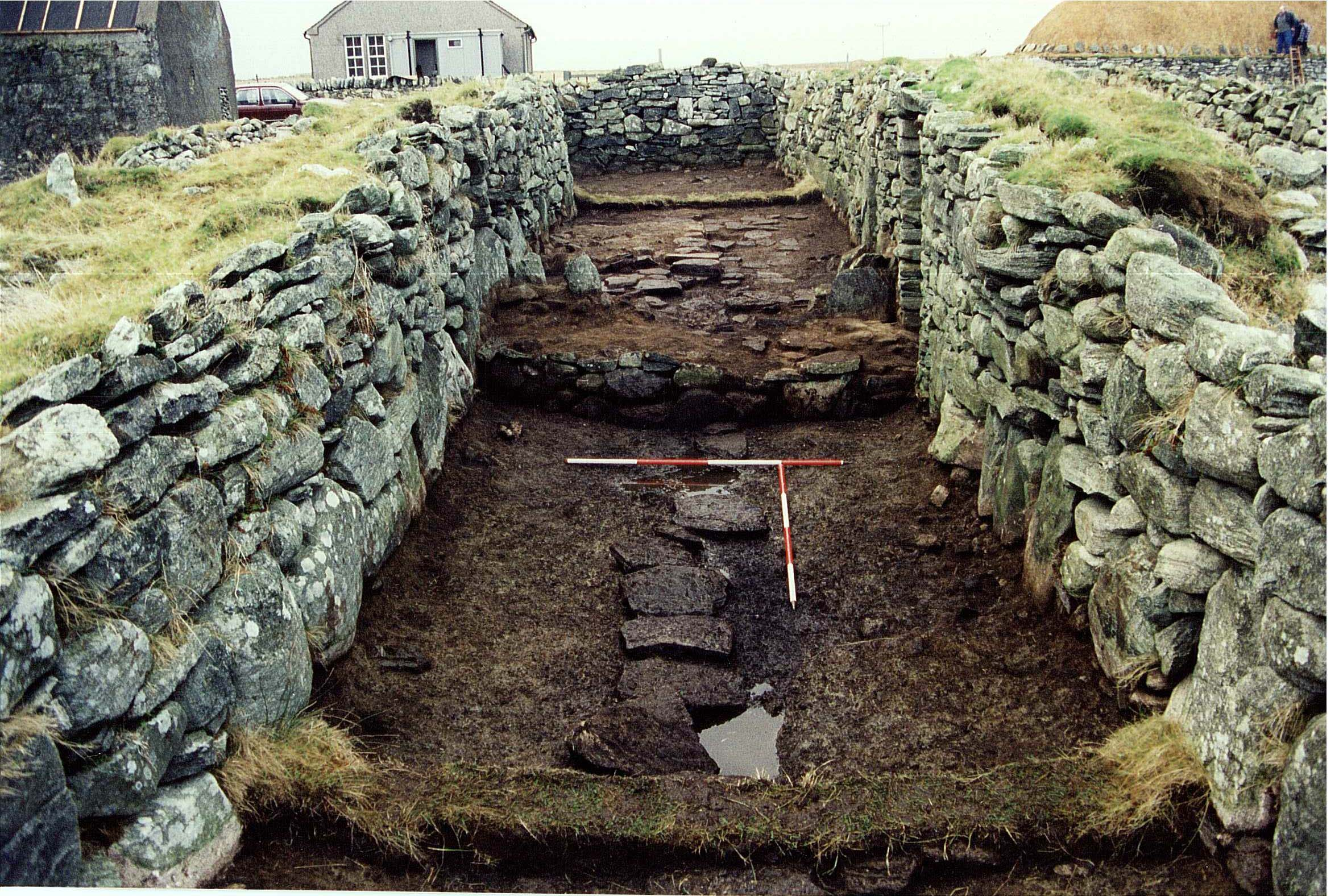
No. 39 - Excavated room showing byre with central drain and living space beyond - note the width of the walls
