= Killin incident of 1749 =

Killin incident
- Part of the aftermath of the Jacobite rising of 1745
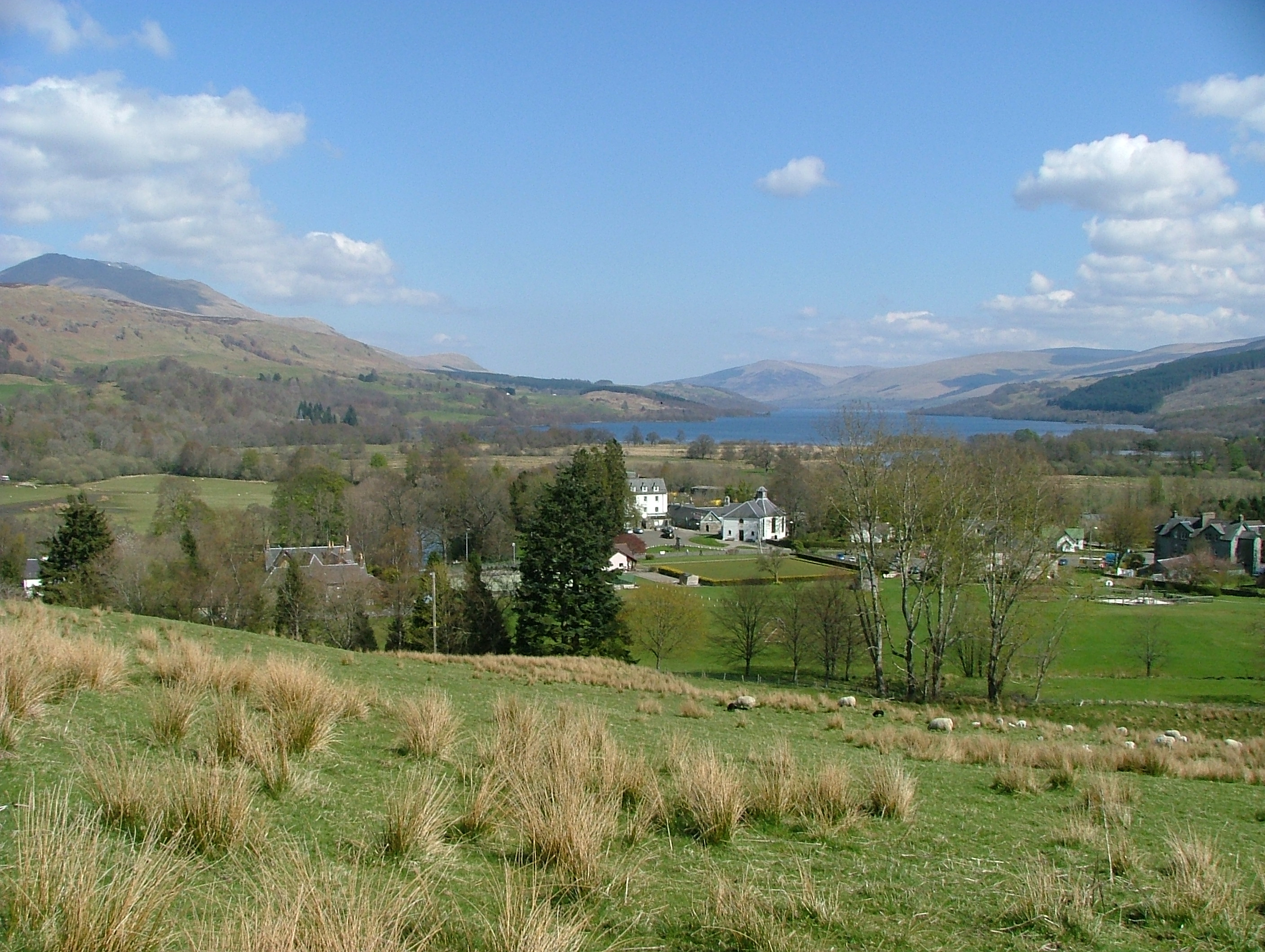
- The village of Killin, Scottish Highlands with Loch Tay in the background
Date	August 1749
Location	Killin, Scotland
Result	Rebel victory

Belligerents
(Kingdom of Great Britain) British Government; Pulteney’s Regiment	Jacobites

Commanders and leaders
(Kingdom of Great Britain) Captain Hughes	Mr Campbell, Sheriff depute in Killin

Casualties and losses
None	

The Killin incident of 1749 took place in August 1749 in Killin in the Scottish Highlands in the tumultuous aftermath of the Jacobite rising of 1745. Two men who had been plundering at will in full Highland dress after the Dress Act 1746 had made it illegal to wear it, had been captured by soldiers of the British Army, but a large mob secured their release.

== Background ==
After the Jacobite rising of 1745 the Dress Act 1746 was passed by George II of Great Britain making it illegal, as of 1 August 1747, for any man or boy to wear Highland dress. However, there was a lack of cooperation, as the military saw it, of the civilian authorities to bring in offenders. Captain Hughes of Pulteney's Regiment reported from his headquarters at Loch Rannoch in August 1749 that the local sheriff depute had been dismissing individuals taken before him for wearing Highland dress.

== The incident ==
Later that month Captain Hughes reported that a party of fully armed Highlanders had been plundering at Killiecrankie. They were chased as far as Aberfeldy but they escaped because the soldiers could get no help from the local people. However, two of the men were later captured at Killin, but while the Corporal was conducting the two offenders to Captain Hughes he was met by the sheriff depute and a mob. The sheriff depute ordered the soldiers to release the two prisoners or he would put the soldiers in prison and at the same time "abuse" them for "molesting" people for wearing dress that he thought should be tolerated. The soldiers then released the prisoners.

== Aftermath ==
Captain Hughes reported the incident as "the People Insult & Triumph, and while their sheriff depute protects them, make a Jest of Military Power". Captain Hughes reported on 1 October 1749 that one of his patrols in Killin had captured one Duncan Campbell on 22 September who had been wearing "Tartan Clothes" and that he was then confined in the prison of Killin. Captain Hughes also reported that they had recently pursued three armed men who had attacked some cattle drovers and stolen their cattle, but that the Highlanders being lighter armed and dressed were able to escape.

Similar incidents were reported around the same time in other parts of the Scottish Highlands: On 16 September 1749 a Captain Scott of Guise's Regiment who was stationed at Braemar Barracks reported that his men had pursued a Highlander who had appeared armed and in "Highland Dress" but that he had fairly outrun them and that they had opened fire on him as he ran into a wood, but missed him. The same Captain reported on 1 October 1749 that one of his Sergeants was missing, presumed murdered, who had been in pursuit of four men who had appeared armed and in "Highland Garb", and who were presumed to be thieves. The Captain reported again that as of 4 October 1749 the Sergeant was still missing and presumed murdered.

The ban on wearing Highland dress was repealed in 1782 and the wearing of it returned to civil use. However, it became a fashion for both the English and Scots, and in particular the English aristocracy. The seal of royal approval for wearing both tartan and Highland dress came in 1822 when George IV of the United Kingdom made his visit to Edinburgh dressed accordingly.
