= McLaren High School =

Secondary school in Callander, Scotland

Coordinates: 56°14′20″N 4°12′46″W

Information
- Motto: Ab Origine Fides (Faith from the Beginning)
- Established: 1892; 134 years ago
- Founder: Donald McLaren
- Ofsted: Reports
- Enrollment: 645 (2021)
- Website: www.mclarenhigh.co.uk

McLaren High School is a state comprehensive, non-denominational secondary school in Callander, central Scotland. It was founded in 1892 by Donald McLaren, and is part of Stirling Council. The current school building has been in place since 1965 and work on an upgrade started in 2006 with new wings added. The 2021 roll was 645 students. The school has building has three floors.

== History ==
McLaren High School's benefactor and founder was Donald McLaren, a banker, originally from the Strathearn area, the traditional lands of Clan MacLaren. Donald McLaren was born in 1831 and during his lifetime funded and supported the programme that eventually founded McLaren High School in 1892; he died in 1894.

The original McLaren High School building on Bridgend Road, Robertson House, (now used as Callander Primary School) was gifted to the school in 1912, but became too small in 1965 and the school was relocated to a new building 500 meters away on Mollands Road. In 1986 the school was again deemed too small so a library extension and five prefabricated huts (four with two classrooms and the other of three classrooms) were added to the campus. In July 2000, an arson attack on the school left the swimming pool in ruins and parts of the gymnasium was also badly damaged by smoke and water. Thankfully by this time, McLaren Leisure Centre which opened on the campus in 1998 (complete with swimming pool) had facilitated its swimming pool and gymnasium for the school to use for physical education lessons. In 2002 the school was again deemed too small and two more prefabricated huts (one of six classrooms and the other of four) were added to the campus as well as plans for a major extension to the main building being put in place. Work on the extension was scheduled to start in 2005 but was delayed due to problems with other schools in the projects. Work on the extension started in 2006 and many of the old parts of the school went under a major refurbishment. Refurbishment was completed in 2009. The refurbished building was officially opened on 24 April 2009 by Provost Fergus Wood.

The Badge of McLaren High School, including the motto “Ab Origine Fides” (Faith from the Beginning) is derived from the coat of arms of the Clan Labhran. Up until 2020, their values were in the shape of the acronym “ORCA” (Order Respect Care Achievement). This however changed to: Opportunity, Achievement, Individuality, Community, Kindness, and Equity.
