= Glen Lochay =

Glen in Perthshire, Scotland

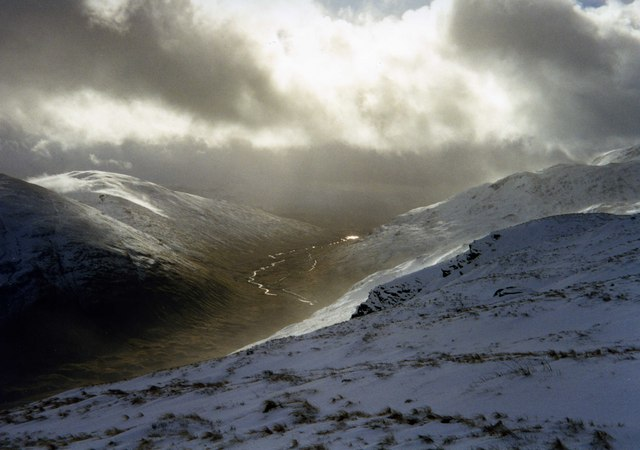
South-West Glen Lochay near to Stob an Fhir-Bhogha, taken from Southern slopes of Beinn Heasgarnich. This photograph was taken from grid reference NN411372 looking South-southwest

Glen Lochay (Scottish Gaelic: Gleann Lòchaidh) is in Perthshire, Scotland through which the River Lochay runs eastward towards Loch Tay, joining the River Dochart at Killin. Glen Lochay is about 20 miles (32 km) long, running from a point north of Crianlarich to Loch Tay.

A road runs up the glen as far as Kenknock Farm (at grid reference NN465364), but there is no vehicular access beyond this point. A track leads further up the glen past cottages at Badour, then Batavaime farm (at grid reference NN421347), the last occupied building in Glen Lochay. The ruins of cottages can be seen higher up the glen, but these were vacated long ago.

The route of a seven-mile (11 km) walk through this "delightful and remote glen" is documented.

There is an extensive local hydroelectric network throughout this area, much of which is buried under the ground and goes largely unseen, but some pipelines are visible crossing the glen.

== Gallery ==
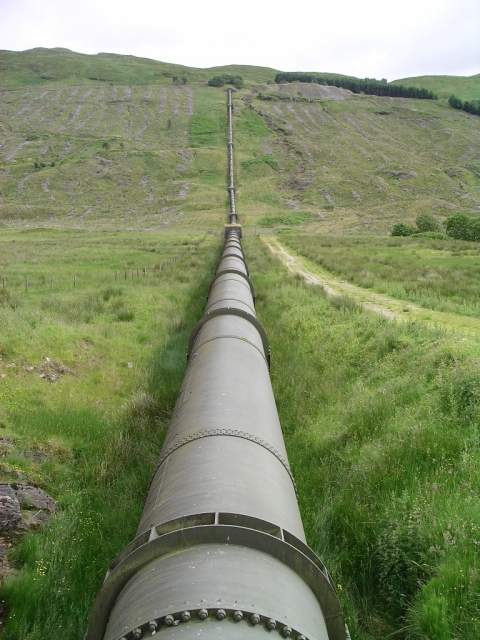
Water pipe across the glen

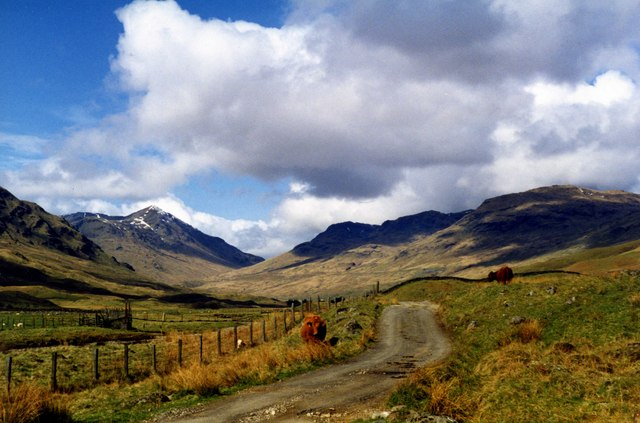
Glen Lochay looking west

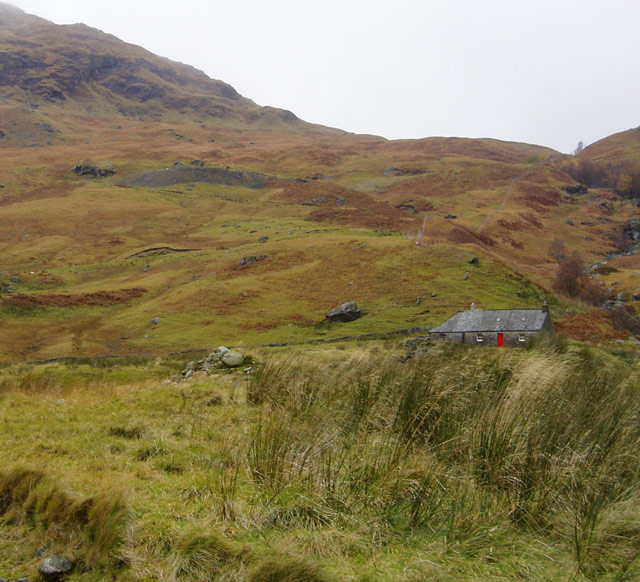
Batavaime farm
