= Killin =

Village in Perthshire, Scotland

Coordinates: 56.466°N 4.318°W

Killin: Scottish Gaelic: Cill Fhinn
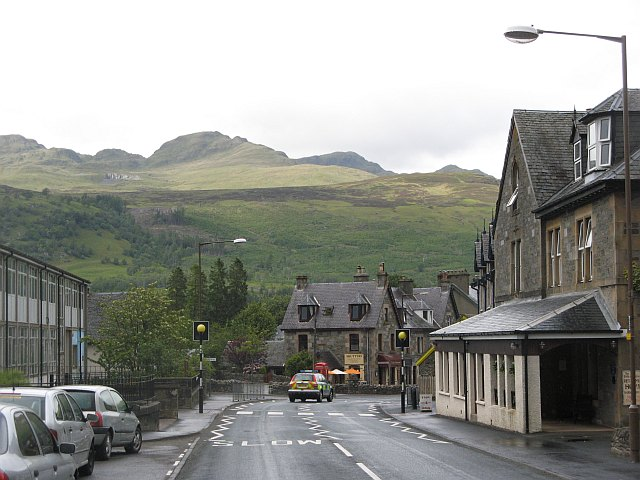
- Main Street, Killin, with Meall nan Tarmachan in the background to the north

- Location within the Stirling council area
- Population: 740 (2020)
- OS grid reference: NN572328
- Civil parish: Killin
- Council area: Stirling
- Lieutenancy area: Stirling and Falkirk
- Country: Scotland
- Sovereign state: United Kingdom
- Post town: Killin
- Postcode district: FK21
- Dialling code: 01567
- Police: Scotland
- Fire: Scottish
- Ambulance: Scottish
- UK Parliament: Stirling and Strathallan
- Scottish Parliament: Stirling
- Website: www.killin.info

Killin (/ˌkɪlˈɪn/; Scottish Gaelic: Cill Fhinn) is a village in Perthshire in the central Highlands of Scotland. Situated at the western head of Loch Tay, it is administered by the Stirling Council area. Killin is a historic conservation village and sits within the Loch Lomond and The Trossachs National Park. It is the central settlement of the historic region of Breadalbane.

Killin is notable as a historically important part of the Gaidhealtachd of Perthshire and a centre of wildlife and adventure tourism.

In July 2023, Killin was voted one of the most desirable locations to live and visit in Scotland, owing to its significant history, setting and facilities by Planetware.com, an expert travel website. A recent analysis (July 2021) by a leading mental health life insurance provider identified Killin as the second-best holiday destination for wellness in the United Kingdom.

== Location and Etymology ==
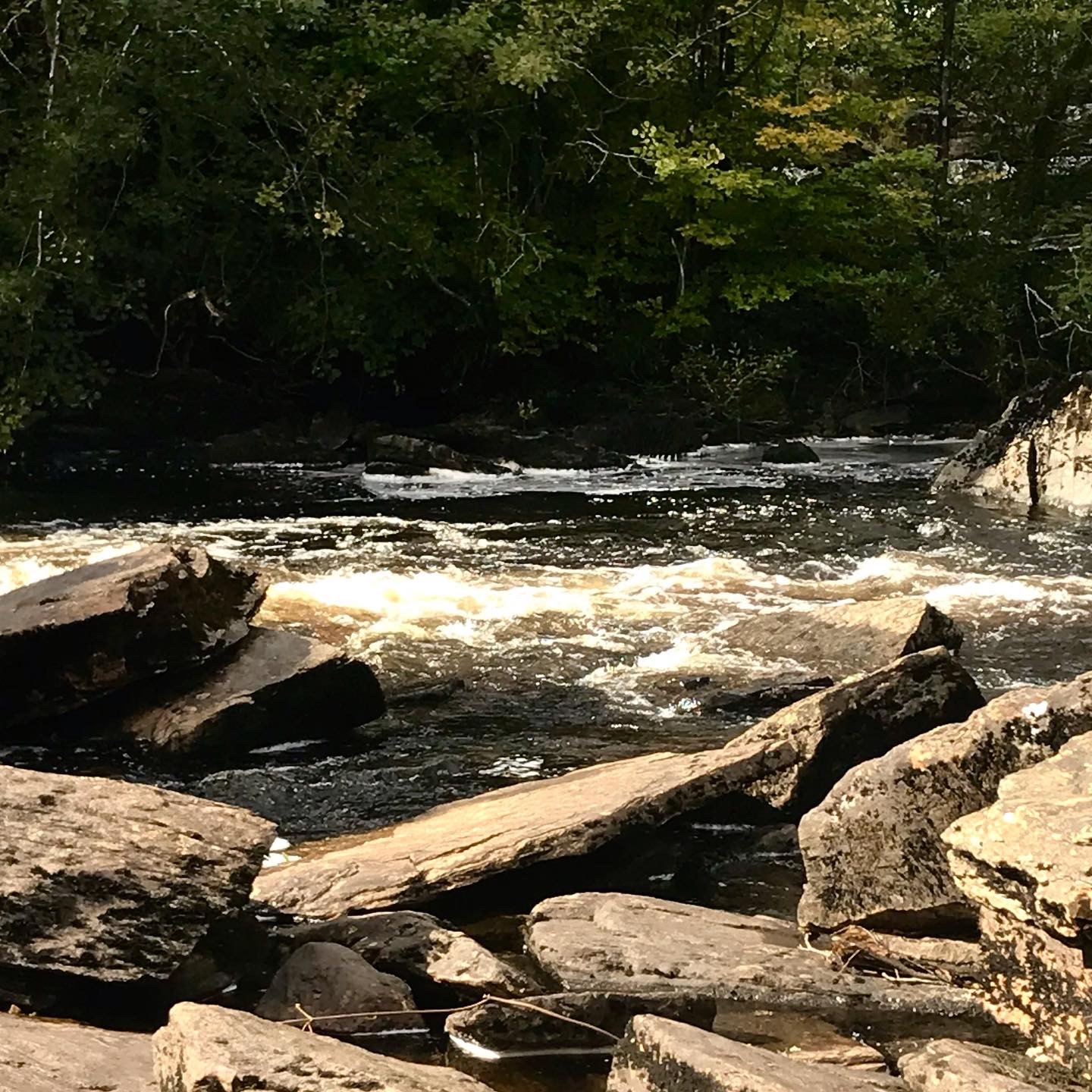
The River Dochart flows through Killin

The west end of the village is magnificently sited around the scenic Falls of Dochart (Scottish Gaelic: Eas Dochard). The falls are crossed by a narrow, multi-arched stone bridge carrying the main A827 road into Killin. The main street then leads down towards the Loch at the confluence of the rivers Dochart (Scottish Gaelic: Abhainn Dochard) and Lochay (Scottish Gaelic: Abhainn Lòchaidh). The A827 provides road access from the South and West, with travel times from the main Scottish cities of Edinburgh and Glasgow of approximately 90 minutes. The A827 road also provides access from the north and East, albeit via a higher level rural route along the edge of Loch Tay (Scottish Gaelic: Loch Tatha).

Killin is the central settlement of the historic region of Breadalbane. In Gaelic breadalbane is Bràghad Albann, "the high part, or the upper part of Scotland". This is an apt toponym as the village is surrounded by prominent and striking mountain ranges including Meall nan Tarmachan and the Ben Lawers range, that provide an alpine backdrop to the village.

The name Killin (Cill Fhinn), is Gaelic and reflects the predominant language of the area for most of recorded history. Killin is sometimes translated into English as the "fair or white church" but is sometimes also translated as "Finn's church, or cell". The latter interpretation links to local legend that Fingal, the mythical hero of the Ossian saga, is buried in the hills overlooking the village.

== History ==
The history of Killin is ancient and there is plentiful evidence of prehistoric habitation of the area including several iron-age artificial islands or Crannog's along the shores of Loch Tay - a reconstructed example can be seen at the Scottish Crannog Centre. Other evidence of prehistoric habitation include a preserved standing stone circle, the Kinnell Stone Circle, close to the village along with the less well preserved remains of ancient hill forts around the area.

For a period in history Killin was one of the front lines in the wars between the original Pictish people of Highland Scotland and the invading Gaels from Ireland, prior to them becoming united under Kenneth MacAlpin.

The MacNab Clan were once dominant here, and have long been associated with Killin. Their ancient burial ground is still on Inchbuie in the River Dochart, just below the falls, and is accessible from the bridge.

Kinnell House was the seat of the MacNabs. A well-preserved prehistoric stone circle (possibly 'restored' to improve its appearance) known as Kinnell Stone Circle can be seen in the grounds of the house. To the north of the village lie the ruins of the Campbells of Breadalbane stronghold of Finlarig Castle, with its associated chapel. The growing power of the Campbells eventually ousted the MacNabs, who lost Kinnell House to their rivals. In 1694 Sir John Campbell of Glenorchy, 1st Earl of Breadalbane established Killin as a Burgh of barony. In 1949 Kinnell House and its estate returned to the ownership of the Chief of Clan Macnab, but in 1978 death duties forced the then Chief, James Charles Macnab of Macnab, to sell most of the estate.

The Killin incident of 1749 took place in August 1749 in the tumultuous aftermath of the Jacobite rising of 1745. Two men who had been plundering at will in full Highland dress after the Dress Act 1746 had made it illegal wear it, had been captured by soldiers of the British Army, but a large mob secured their release.

In 1767 the minister of Killin, James Stuart, published the first New Testament in Scottish Gaelic.

By the end of the 18th century there was a local linen industry. Flax was grown locally, spun in small mills and woven into linen by home based weavers. Today, Killin services the local rural community and the growing tourism and leisure industries. In addition to walking on Ben Lawers National Nature Reserve, fishing for trout and salmon there are various watersports available on Loch Tay. Many local vernacular buildings have been preserved or converted, allowing the village to retain much of its historic character.

The 19th century Moirlanich Longhouse in nearby Glen Lochay is a rare surviving example of the cruck frame Scottish longhouse, and is now in the care of the National Trust for Scotland. The former Breadalbane Folklore Centre in the Victorian mill by the falls displays the 'healing stones' of Saint Fillan.

Tomnadashan Mine, an abandoned copper mine overlooking the village is sometimes identified as the haunt of the Rabbit of Caerbannog of Monty Python and the Holy Grail fame. Nearby Glen Lochay is the location to which Richard Hannay, played by Robert Donat, heads in Alfred Hitchcock's 1935 film The 39 Steps.

Killin railway station was on the Killin Railway. The railway station was officially closed on 1 November 1965.

== Local Folklore and Traditions ==
Killin has a rich history of folklore and customs which have been passed down mainly through the Gaelic oral tradition.

There are many local accounts of supernatural creatures and occurrences. These include accounts of Each-uisge (Water horses) who were said to lure children to the waterside and drown them when they would attempt to mount them, Tarbh-Uisge (Water bulls) who were thought to be dangerous to humans and reproduce with regular cattle, Sìthean (Faeries) who were mischievous and dangerous, Ùruisg (water spirits) who were troublemakers and vandals, and Ban-sìth (Banshee), whose screams were signs of impending death. There were also many stories of people with supernatural powers such as witches or those with An Dà Shealladh (the second sight) who could foresee future events - the most famous of which was Am Ban-Tighearna Labhar (The Lady of Lawers).

Local Folklore holds that Fingal, mythical hero of the Ossian saga is buried in Killin. A large standing stone situated just above Breadalbane Park in the centre of the village purports to be the headstone from his grave.

The area is also abound with many local legends about healing pools and healing stones, the most famous of which are the healing stones of St Fillan. The ancient practice of the re-bedding of St Fillan's stones on Christmas Eve is still observed and part of the local Christmas celebrations.

It was tradition in Killin that Oidhche-Samhna (Halloween) was observed on the old pagan date of 11 November. It is not known when it began to be celebrated on the newer date of October 31, but it was celebrated on the old date until at least the time of the Great War. Halloween was always celebrated with teintean-aighir (bonfires) which were lit in Coire nam Bonnach, just above the village, where there was dancing and merryment. There were Gìsearan (Guisers) who would visit people's homes to perform poems, jokes or songs and be given gifts of money or food. Local children would often play pranks such as removing and hiding the gates from people's gardens.

It was traditional in Killin for Hogmanay to be a greater celebration than that of Christmas. It was a special day when special drinks and foods would be consumed and visitors would be welcomed into the home.

The people of Killin (and West Perthshire generally) continue to strongly identify with their identity as part of Perthshire. Killin, like other parts of West Perthshire, fell under the administration of Stirling Council following the 1973 reorganisation of local Government which effectively dissolved Perthshire as a locality council area. Despite this, Perthshire continues to exist as a registration county and locals overwhelmingly continue to identify as Perthshire residents.

== Gaelic in Killin ==
Killin has been a Gaelic-speaking village for almost all of recorded history. English has only gradually become the dominant language here over the last century. The village has always held the highest proportion of Gaelic speakers in West Perthshire, even to this day, and is therefore a culturally and historically important site in the Gaidhealtachd of Perthshire.

One of the most significant Gaelic cultural contributions from Killin was the first Gaelic translation of the New Testament, completed by James Stuart, Minister of Killin, in 1767. Another is The Killin Collection, a culturally important body of Gaelic songs collected from the area, by Charles Stewart in 1884.

The Gaelic Local Studies summary for Perthshire and Stirling provides an insight into the place of Gaelic in Killin over more than a century:

In 1881 Killin village and rural Killin recorded speakers numbers of 340 (71.9%) and 422 (80.1%) respectively, when Gaelic language ability was included in Scotland's census for the first time. The broader parish of Killin recorded over 1,100 Gaelic speakers living locally at this time, representing 78.5% of the total area population, 5.05% of which (56) where monolingual Gaels. By 1901 this had decreased to 62.5% for rural Killin, 49.3% for the Killin village, and 48% for the broader parish.

Consistent with other parts of Gaelic-speaking Scotland there has been a pattern of gradual language shift away from Gaelic towards English. Despite this it was still common to hear native Perthshire Gaelic in the community in and around Killin in the 1960s and 70s. Indeed, the 1961 census recorded 138 speakers in Killin along with the last recorded monolingual speaker. In the 1971 census there were 120 Gaelic speakers but none of these were monolingual. By the time of the 2001 census the electoral division of Killin recorded only 63 Gaelic speakers (4.7% of the local population) with 39 (5.9%) in Killin village. Despite this decline Killin still recorded the highest numbers of Gaelic speakers in all of West-Perthshire.

Although the Perthshire dialect of Gaelic is considered to be effectively extinct, surviving elderly speakers have recently been identified. However, with a lack of community transmission any surviving speakers in the Killin area are likely to be the final generation of native Perthshire Gaelic speakers.

The decline of Gaelic in the area is in keeping with the trend across Scotland and can be attributed to a combination of events including the Highland clearances (Gaelic: Fuadaichean nan Gàidheal) which resulted in great swathes of locals being forcibly removed from the land. The Education (Scotland) Act 1872 also made it illegal for Gaels to be educated or use their language in formal education settings. These changes along with others have led to a process of language shift across the Highlands and Islands of Scotland.

More recently, Killin has suffered particularly from a lack of Gaelic Medium Education provision from Stirling council. This is in contrast to the provision in neighbouring Perth and Kinross Council, such as the weekly Gaelic lessons at Glen Lyon primary school, close to Killin, and full GME at Breadalbane Academy in nearby Aberfeldy. The closest GME provision offered by Stirling council is at Riverside Primary School in Stirling.

Despite its many challenges Gaelic survives in the area amongst a small number of local speakers as well as in the language, history, folklore and many places names of the area. The Killin Music Festival is a successful 3-day music festival held in the village in June each year with Gaelic/Celtic and Folk music influences.

The last known native speaker of Perthshire Gaelic, Elizabeth Christina McDiarmaid (originally of nearby Lawyers), died at 92 years old in April 2024 at the Falls of Dochart Care Home in Killin.

== Amenities ==
Killin is a popular tourist destination and a thriving community with a host of local groups including a drama group, badminton club and youth group. The village is also host to number of practical amenities for locals and visitors.

The Killin News is a free community newspaper issued every 2 months and available by subscription or to be found in local shops and businesses.

There are several hotels and more traditional Inns with restaurants catering to locals and hotel residents. The village is also well equipped with several cafes, a post office and chemist, and several small shops including two gift shops, and an outdoor centre (where outdoor equipment can be hired), as well as a small but well stocked Co-op food store.

There is a Petrol station available at Lix Toll, at the junction between the main A85 road and the A827 which leads into Killin.

There is a well-equipped Children's play park in Breadalbane Park in the centre of the village.

Killin has a small primary school with 56 pupils. For secondary education pupils travel to Callander 21 miles (34 km) to the south. Killin has for generations been an important part of the Gàidhealtachd. However, the nearest Gaelic medium primaries are in Stirling, 37 miles (60 km) to the south and Aberfeldy 23 miles (37 km) to the East.

== Sights and Activities ==
Killin serves as a base for exploration of both the highlands and central Scotland. Common day trips to places such as Oban and Glencoe in the Highlands, the market towns of Aberfeldy and Crieff, as well as the lowland urban centres of Glasgow, Stirling, Perth, Dundee and Edinburgh are all within a short distance by car.

In the immediate area there is a great deal to explore, particularly for outdoor enthusiasts.

- Killin is a common base for hillwalkers given its central location and close proximity to several Munroes including the ranges of Meall nan Tarmachan and Ben Lawers.
- Ski touring is a popular activity in the mountains of the area and Killin is only approximately 40 minutes drive to Glencoe Ski area containing good skiing for beginners alongside Scotland's longest and steepest runs.
- The Heart 200 driving route, a long-distance driving route through Perthshire similar to the North Coast 500 passes through the village.
- Ben Lawers National Nature Reserve hosts internationally important examples of alpine plant life.
- The Scottish Crannog Centre museum hosts a reconstructed crannog on Lochtayside, giving insight into the lives of prehistoric peoples of the area.
- Kinnell Stone Circle stand in the grounds of Linnell House in Killin.
- The Falls of Dochart, a beautiful set of rapids on the River Dochart, are the centre point of the village.
- The ancient Clan Macnab Burial ground is located on Innis Buidhe, accessed from the Dochart Bridge in the centre of the village.
- The Moirlanich Longhouse Museum in Killin offers visitors an insight into highland life of the past in a preserved Longhouse.
- Glen Lyon sits immediately above the village in the Loch Rannoch and Glen Lyon National Scenic Area.
- Wildlife tourism is popular in the area, with local species including red squirrels, pine Martin, otters, beavers, osprey and even populations of Scottish Wildcat. Wildlife tours are offered in nearby Dull by Highland Safaris.
- The Firbush Outdoor Centre lies a couple of miles east of Killin on the shore of Loch Tay. Owned and operated by Edinburgh University it offers a range of outdoor pursuits and accommodations.
- Killin Golf Club offer a picturesque 9-hole Course.
- The Rob Roy Way, a 127 km long-distance walking path runs through Killin.
- National Cycle Route 7 runs through the village.

== Events ==
The village has a thriving local community and hosts a number of annual events. These include:

Event	Month	Description
Duck race	April	A family fun day duck race held on either the River Dochart or River Lochay.
Killin Music Festival	June	A successful annual music festival.
Killin Highland Games	August	A traditional highland event incorporating traditional competitions for music, dance, strength and athleticism.
Killin Agricultural Show	August	An agricultural show is a public event exhibiting the equipment, animals, sports and recreation associated with agriculture and animal husbandry. Locals can also take part in Scarecrow competition.
Killin 10K and 5K races	September	Organised by Tay Fitness Events.
Swim Loch Tay	September	A competitive swimming event held on Loch Tay.
Santa dash	December	A family fun run where all runners dress as Santa.
Hogmanay fireworks display	December	A fireworks display is held at midnight on Hogmanay on the dochart bridge to mark the arrival of the new year.
30/12 concert	December	A live musical event held on 30 December (usually with popular Scottish music focus) run by Killin Music Festival.
New Year's Day ceilidh	January	A traditional ceilidh held on 1 January.

== Notable people ==
- Rev Prof Patrick Campbell MacDougall FRSE (1806-1867), Professor of Moral Philosophy at the University of Edinburgh, born in the manse in Killin the son of Rev Hugh MacDougall
- Rev James Stuart (1701-1789) was the minister for Killin when he created the first translated version of the New Testament into Scottish Gaelic.

== Gallery ==
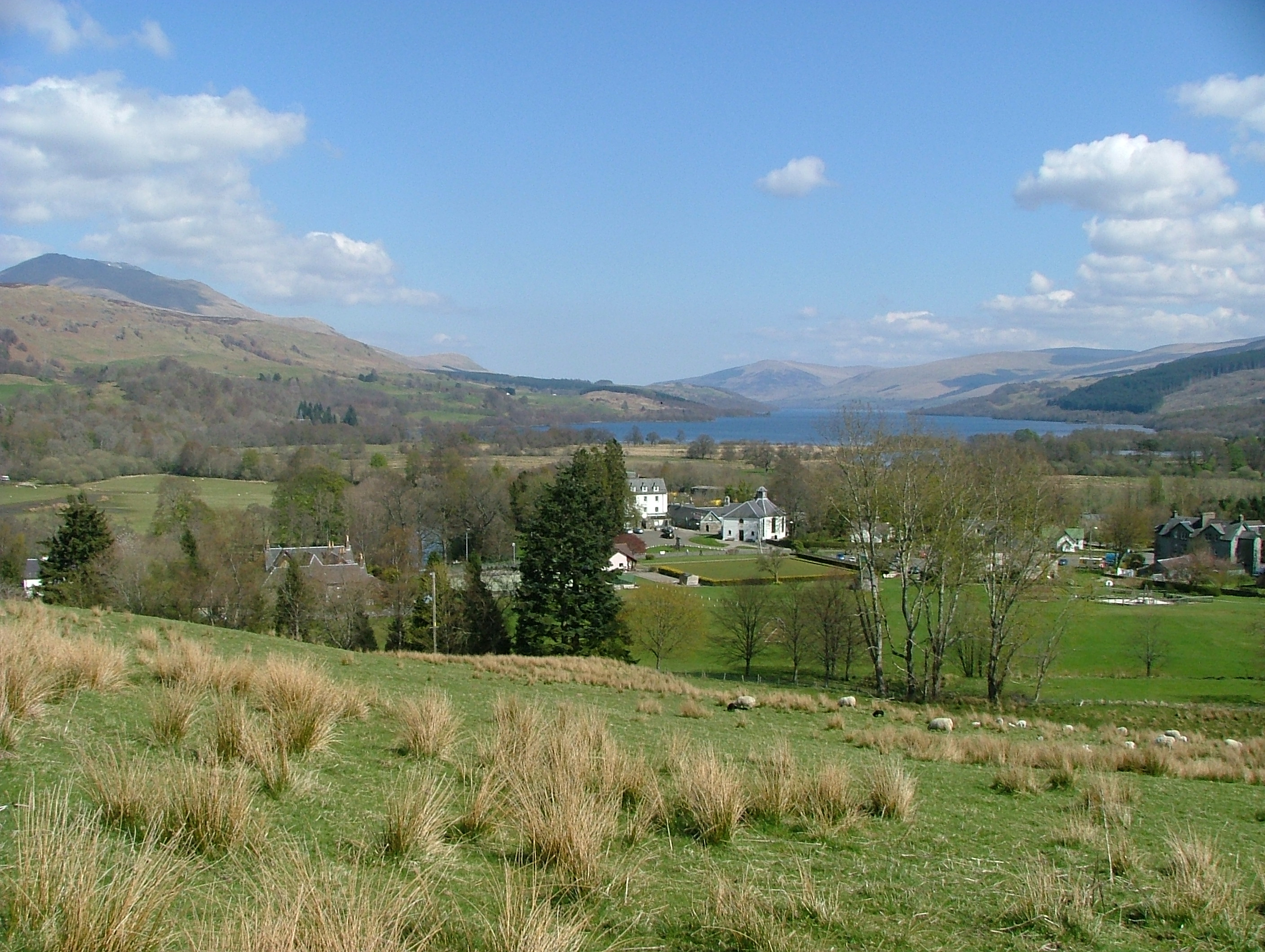
Loch Tay, Killin with Ben Lawers on the left taken from a short distance up Sron a Chlachain.

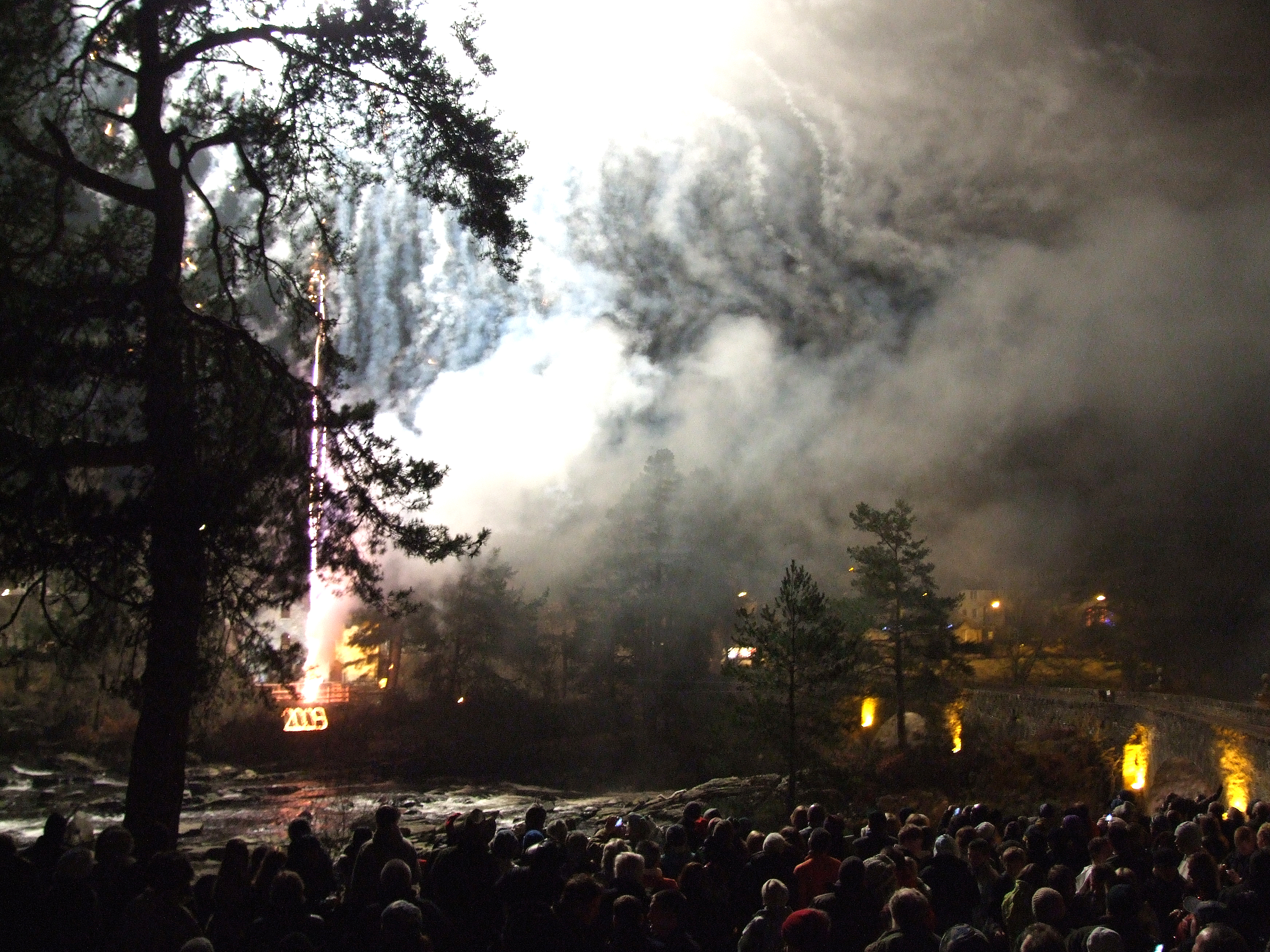
Hogmanay fireworks celebrations on the Bridge of Dochart, Killin.

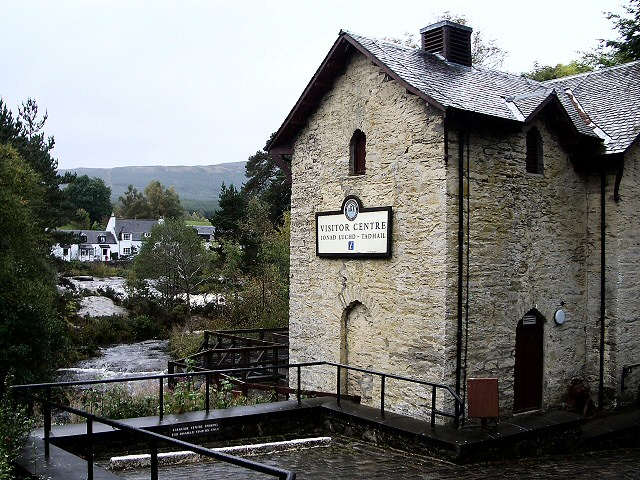
Breadalbane Visitor Centre, now Killin Water Mill, looking south east across the Falls of Dochart.

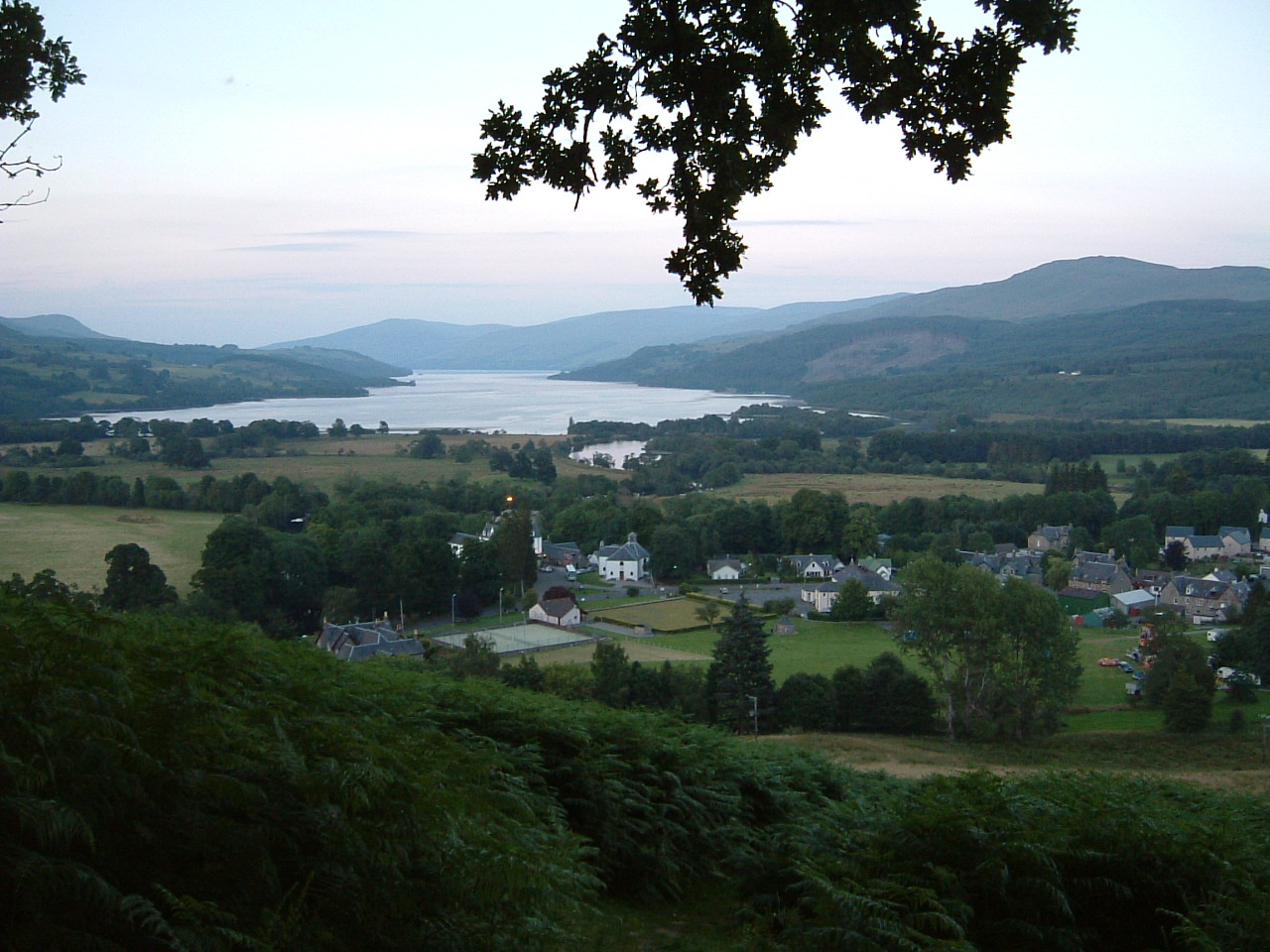
Killin and Loch Tay from the sides of Sron a Chlachain.

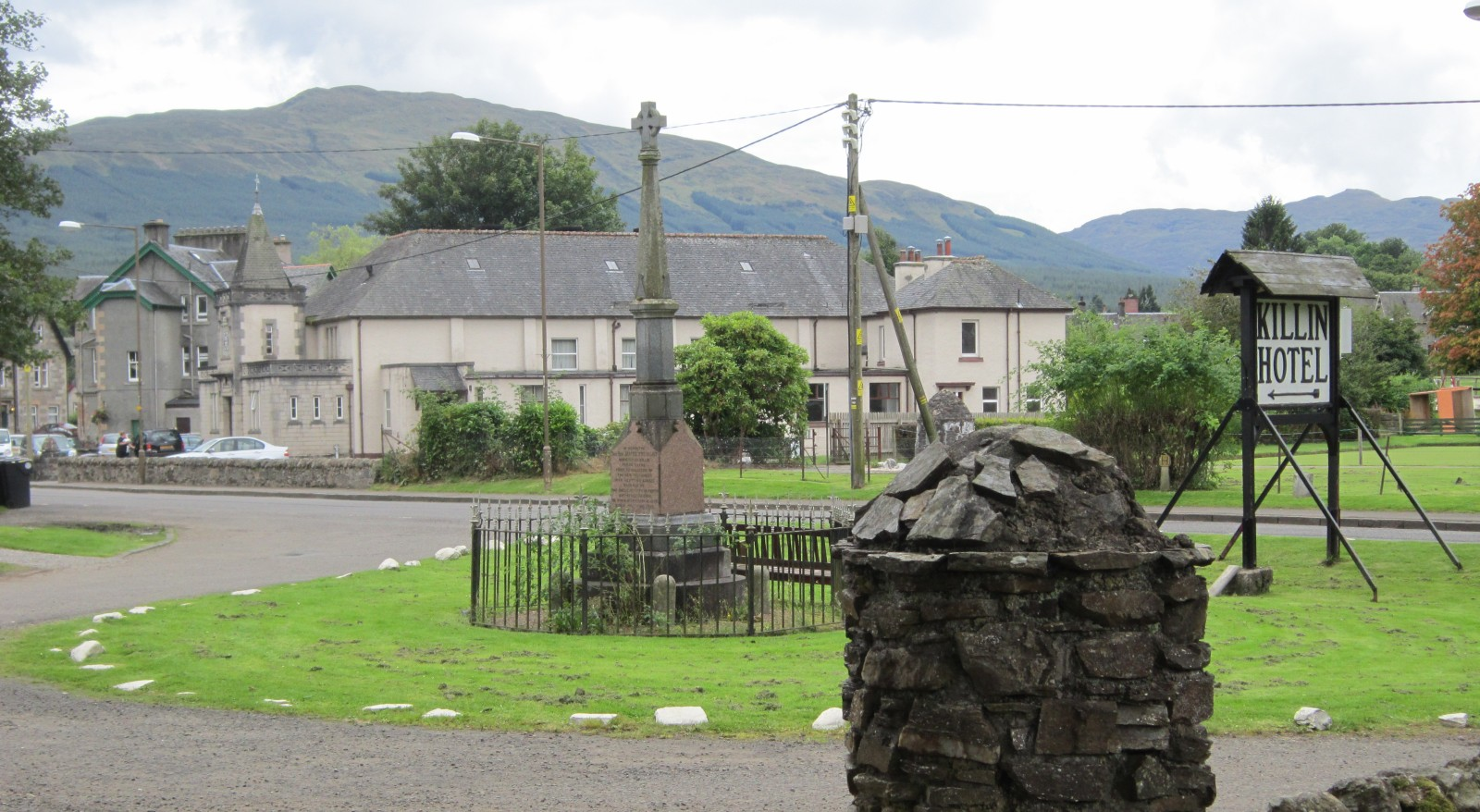
The Stewart Memorial with the McLaren Hall in the background.

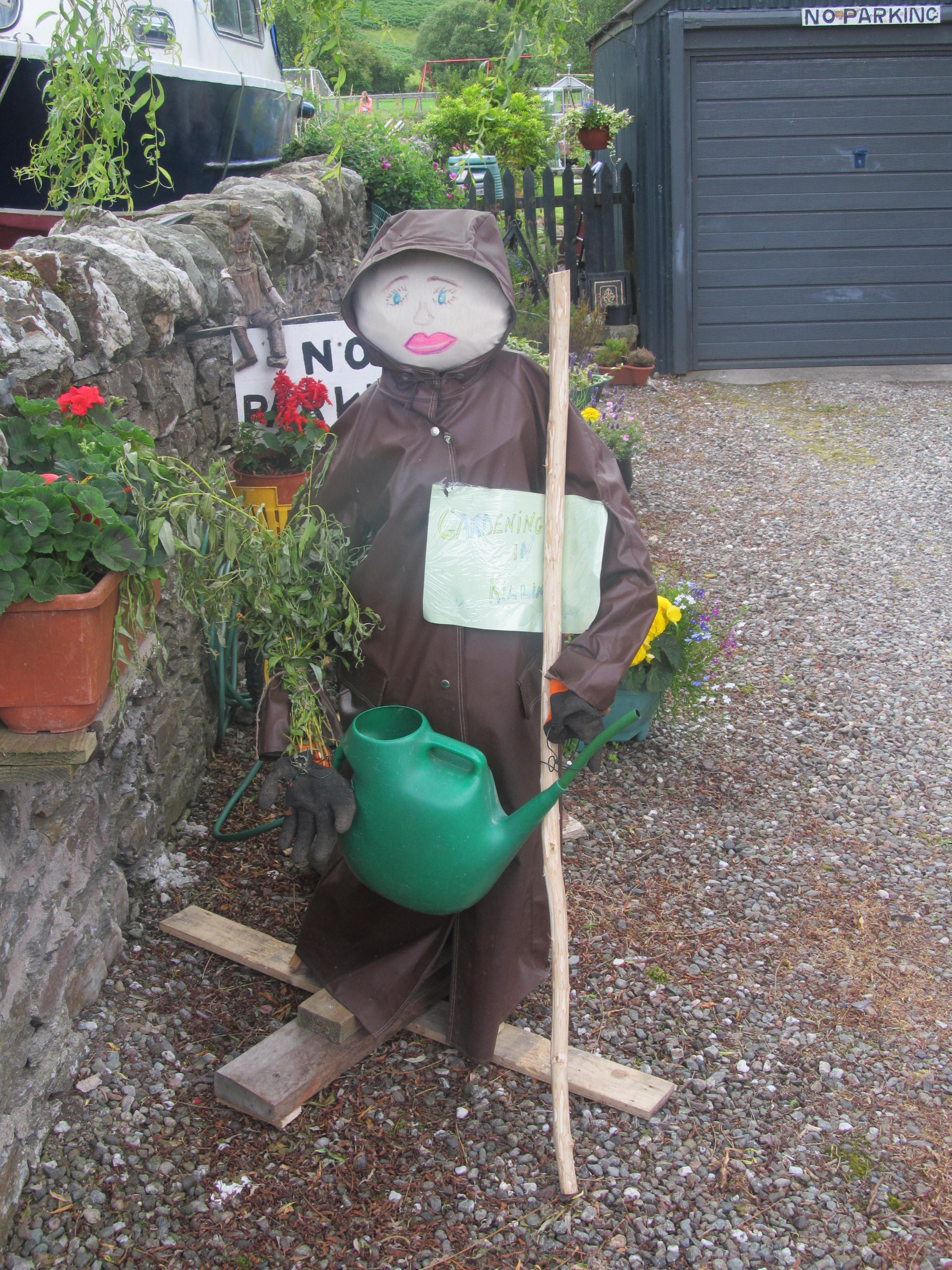
One of many scarecrows in the main street in Killin which are part of the annual Agricultural Festival.

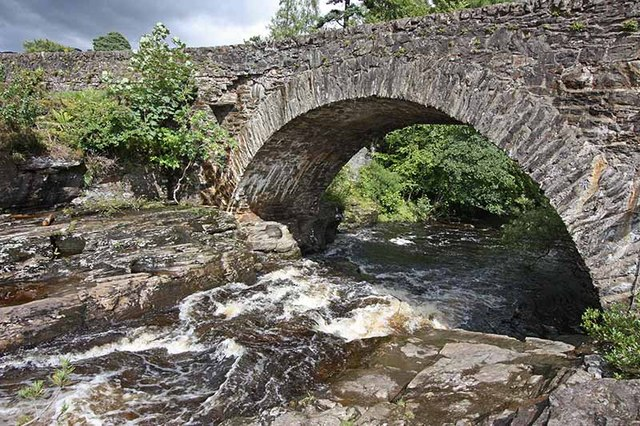
Falls of Dochart with the bridge.

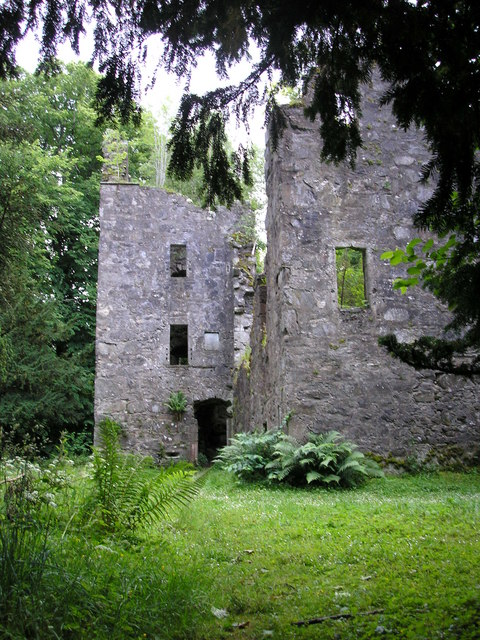
Finlarig Castle in Killin.
