= Heisk =

Scottish folk band

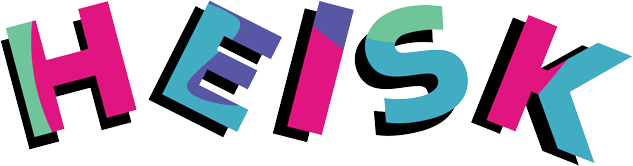

Background information
- Genres: Scottish folk music
- Members: Lauren MacDonald; Megan MacDonald; Becca Skeoch; Isla Callister; Catriona Hawksworth; Sally Simpson
- Website: www.heisk.co.uk

Heisk is a Scottish folk band with a musical style tailored for festival dance parties. It includes six women and emphasizes female empowerment in the Scottish traditional music scene.

== History ==
The band was formed by Skeoch and Hawksworth after they witnessed a dearth of female representation at the Celtic Connections festival. The band's name means "nervous, excitable, agitated or flurried" in the Orcadian dialect of Scots.

== Musical style ==
The band aims for a "festival party vibe". John Barlass of At the Barrier described the band's style as "a blend of traditional influences from Scotland and Europe, all spiced up with healthy and enjoyable servings of funk, soul and unadulterated pop". Cara Macdonald, reviewing a live performance at Celtic Connections, praised their stage presence, including bright and colourful outfits and instruments, which she wrote created a "joyous and celebratory atmosphere".

== Band members ==
- Lauren MacDonald (drums and percussion)
- Megan MacDonald (accordion)
- Becca Skeoch (electro-harp)
- Isla Callister (fiddle)
- Catriona Hawksworth (keyboard)
- Sally Simpson (fiddle and viola)

== Discography ==
- Heisk (2021)
- Headstrong (2024)
