= Loch Tay railway station =

Former railway station in Scotland

Loch Tay

General information
- Location: Loch Tay, Stirling (district); Scotland
- Coordinates: 56.4812°N 4.3030°W
- Platforms: 1

Other information
- Status: Disused

History
- Original company: Killin Railway
- Pre-grouping: Killin Railway
- Post-grouping: London, Midland and Scottish Railway

Key dates
- 1 April 1886: Opened as Loch Tay Killin Pier
- 1 October 1895: Name changed to Loch Tay
- 9 September 1939: Closed
Location

Loch Tay was a railway station located at the head of Loch Tay, Stirling.

== History ==
Opened as Loch Tay Killin Pier on 1 April 1886, the station comprised a single platform on the east side of the line. A loop was provided for running round, and the line continued north to an engine shed. Two sidings for the pier curved away to the east. It connected with shipping services on Loch Tay provided by the Loch Tay Steamboat Company.

Its name was changed to Loch Tay on 1 October 1895. The station closed to passengers on 9 September 1939, however as the engine shed for the line was located here, the line remained in use.

This line was scheduled for closure on 1 November 1965, however the landslide in Glen Ogle resulted in premature closure on 27 September 1965.

== Sources ==
- Hodgins, Douglas; Sanders, Keith (1993). British Railways Past and Present No 31 - North West Scotland. Kettering: Past & Present. ISBN 1-85895-090-2.

Preceding station	Historical railways	Following station
Terminus	Killin Railway	Killin
