= Glenoglehead railway station =

Former railway station in Scotland

Glenoglehead

General information
- Location: Glen Ogle, Stirling (district); Scotland
- Coordinates: 56.4247°N 4.3394°W
- Platforms: 2

Other information
- Status: Disused

History
- Original company: Callander and Oban Railway
- Pre-grouping: Callander and Oban Railway operated by Caledonian Railway

Key dates
- 1 June 1870: Opened as Killin
- 1 April 1886: Renamed as Glenoglehead
- 1 April 1889: Closed for passengers
- 28 September 1965: closed completely
Location

Glenoglehead was a railway station located at the head of Glen Ogle, Stirling district, Scotland. It was situated on a remote mountainside, some 3 miles (4.8 km) south of the village of Killin.

== History ==
When opened on 1 June 1870, the station (then named "Killin") was the temporary terminus of the Callander and Oban Railway. This situation persisted until 1 August 1873 when the line was extended to Tyndrum.

Originally, the station had just one platform. There was also a turntable and an engine shed. After the railway was extended to Tyndrum, the station had two platforms, one on either side of a crossing loop, and the turntable and engine shed were removed. There were sidings on the east side of the station.

The station was renamed "Glenoglehead" on 1 April 1886, concurrent with the opening of the Killin Railway and a new station in the village of Killin itself. The original station on the Callander & Oban Railway did not close to passengers until 1 April 1889. The station was occasionally served by excursions until 1916 after which it was used by railway staff until the line closure. Glenoglehead signal box and crossing loop remained in use until the railway's closure in 1965, the actual closure date having been brought forward because of a nearby landslide.

== Signalling ==
Glenoglehead signal box, which replaced the original box on 8 April 1890, was located on the west side of the railway. It had 12 levers.

Preceding station	Historical railways	Following station
Balquhidder	Callander and Oban Railway	Killin Junction
