= Luib railway station =

Former railway station in Scotland

Luib

General information
- Location: Glen Dochart, Stirling (district); Scotland
- Coordinates: 56.41869°N 4.46801°W
- Platforms: 2

Other information
- Status: Disused

History
- Original company: Callander and Oban Railway
- Pre-grouping: Callander and Oban Railway
- Post-grouping: London, Midland and Scottish Railway

Key dates
- 1 August 1873: Opened
- 27 September 1965: Effective closure date
- 5 November 1965: Official closure date
Location

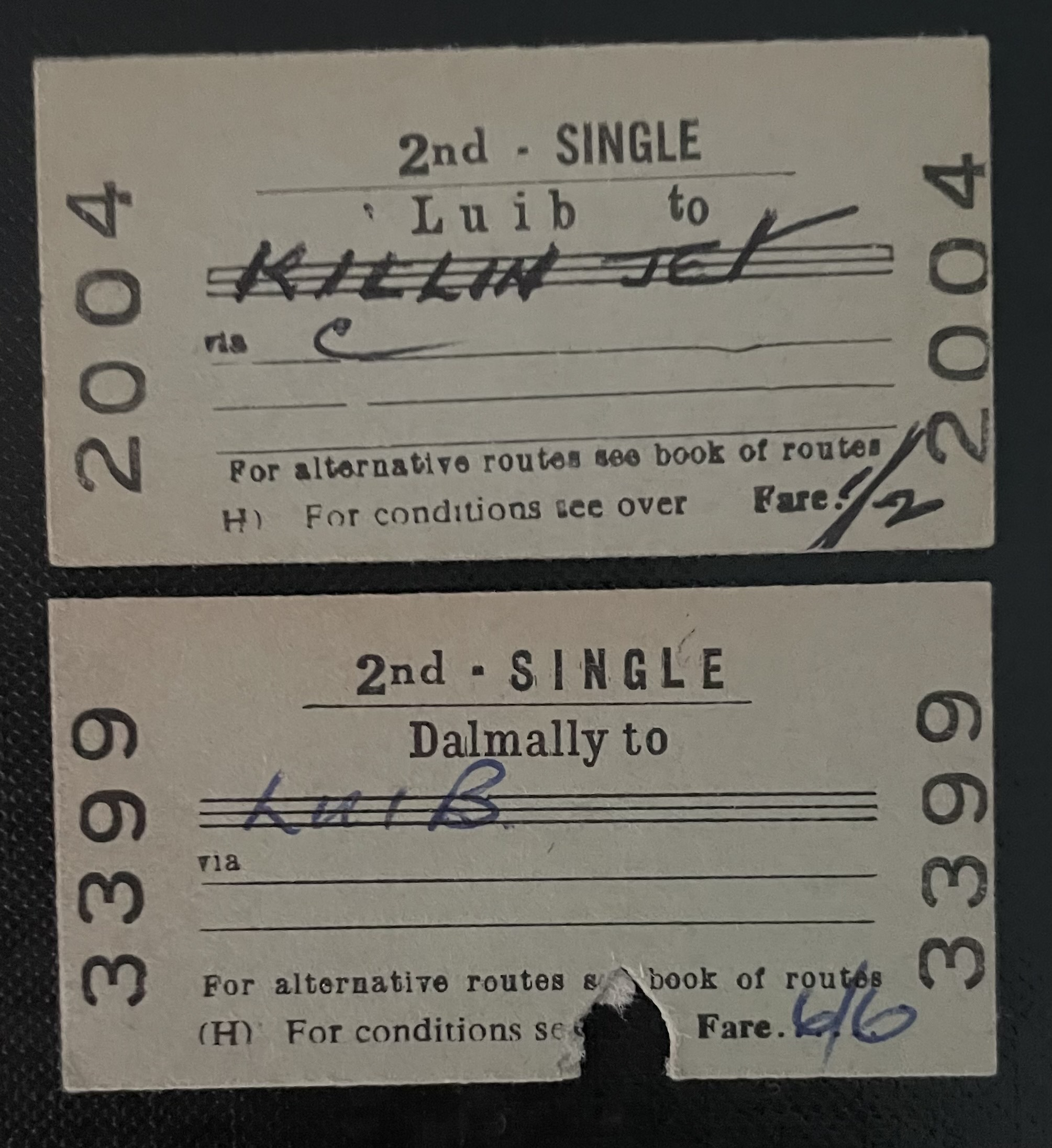
Railway Tickets from and to Luib station

Luib was a railway station located in Glen Dochart, Stirling (district) midway between Crianlarich and Killin.

Preceding station	Historical railways	Following station
Killin Junction	Callander and Oban Railway	Crianlarich Lower

== History ==
This station opened on 1 August 1873, when the Callander and Oban Railway was extended from Glenoglehead to Tyndrum.

The station was laid out with two platforms, one on either side of a crossing loop. There were sidings on the north side of the station.

The station was closed on 27 September 1965 following a landslide in Glen Ogle.

== Signalling ==
Luib signal box, which replaced the original box on 18 March 1890, was located at the west end of the station, on the north side of the line. It had 14 levers.

== Sources ==
- Butt, R. V. J. (October 1995). The Directory of Railway Stations: details every public and private passenger station, halt, platform and stopping place, past and present (1st ed.). Sparkford: Patrick Stephens Ltd. ISBN 978-1-85260-508-7. OCLC 60251199. OL 11956311M.
