= Killin Junction railway station =

Former railway station in Scotland

Killin Junction
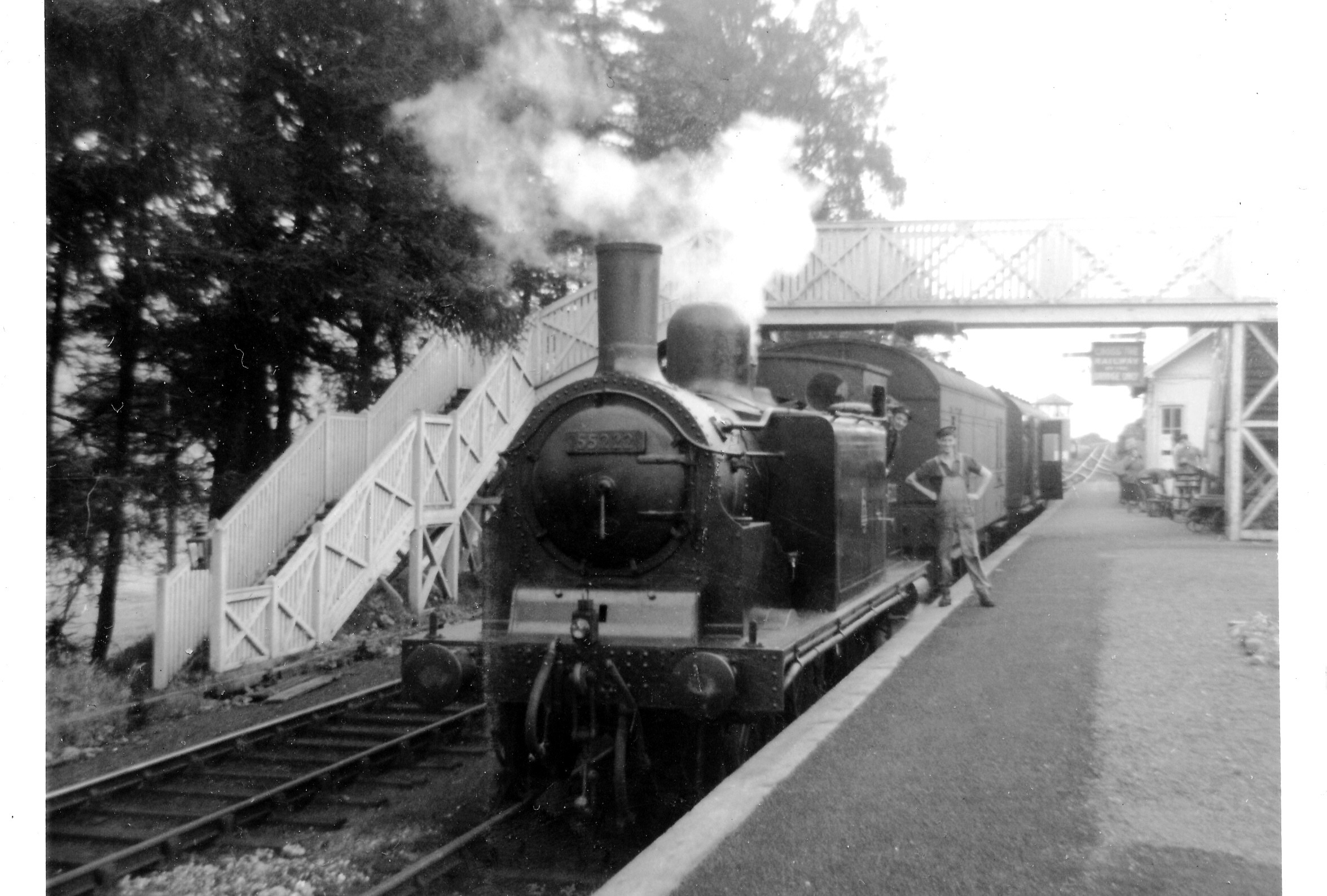
- The branch train to Killin c. 1958

General information
- Location: Glen Dochart, Stirling (district); Scotland
- Coordinates: 56.4277°N 4.3847°W
- Platforms: 3

Other information
- Status: Disused

History
- Original company: Callander and Oban Railway
- Pre-grouping: Callander and Oban Railway
- Post-grouping: London, Midland and Scottish Railway

Key dates
- 1 June 1870: Station opened
- 28 September 1965: Effective closure date
- 1 November 1965: Official closure date
Location

Killin Junction was a railway station located in Glen Dochart, Stirling (district) close to where the road from Glen Ogle joins the Crianlarich to Killin road.

== History ==
Killin Junction station opened on 1 June 1870, providing passengers on the Callander and Oban Railway with a connection to Killin by the newly opened Killin Railway.

The station was situated in the woodlands on the slopes leading up to Glen Ogle pass and, apart from the railway, could be reached by footpath only.

The station was closed on 27 September 1965 following a landslide in Glen Ogle. Nowadays a forestry road following the track of the old line to Killin leads from the A85 to the location. There are still traces of the platforms, a few derelict former railway houses and the line to Glen Ogle, which can be followed for some distance, although fallen trees after a recent storm block the track in places. All signal boxes and other buildings are gone.

Preceding station	Historical railways	Following station
Glenoglehead	Callander and Oban Railway	Luib
Killin	Killin Railway	connection to C&O
