= Acharn =

Acharn may refer to:

- Acharn, Highland, Scotland
- Acharn, Perth and Kinross, Scotland
  - Location of the Falls of Acharn
