= Abernethy (charity) =

Abernethy, formerly known as the Abernethy Trust (founded in 1971) is a non-profit organization. It runs four outdoor activities centres and a bunkhouse in Scotland, providing outdoor instruction and residential facilities.

== History ==
Abernethy was established in 1971 when the Walker family donated their 30-acre (120,000 m^{2}) estate and buildings at Nethybridge. 10 years later Mary Currie, owner of the Hamilton Arms Hotel on the Isle of Arran, gave her property to be used as a Christian Centre resulting in the birth of the Arran Outdoor Centre. In 1984 Brae Lodge at Loch Tay from Mr and Mrs Barratt was accepted as part of the facilities, which ran under the Abernethy banner as the Ardeonaig Outdoor Centre. The fourth centre to come under Abernethy was the Ardgour Outdoor Centre on the Kilmalieu Estate, across the loch from Fort William. In 1997 this centre became the home of the Abernethy Trust School of Adventure Leadership. The last centre to be added to the Abernethy Trust was Barcaple Outdoor Centre, in 1996. This centre was already operating as a Christian outdoor centre, but Barcaple approached Abernethy asking if they could merge their ministry in Dumfries and Galloway with that of Abernethy. This officially happened on 1 January 2001. Around the same time Arran Centre was sold off. Abernethy was also gifted Glen Kin outdoor centre in Argyll which was later sold in 2020.

== About Abernethy ==
The four Abernethy adventure centres are located at:

1. Nethybridge, a forest village in Inverness-shire, close to Loch Morlich and the River Spey
2. Ardeonaig, set on the South bank of Loch Tay in Highland Perthshire.
3. Ardgour, situated on the shores of Loch Linnhe
4. Barcaple, situated on the edge of the Southern Uplands between the Solway coast and the Galloway hills

The former site, Glen Kin, was located near Dunoon.
