= Ardeonaig =

Coordinates: 56.495°N 4.164°W

Ardeonaig: Scottish Gaelic: Àird Eònaig
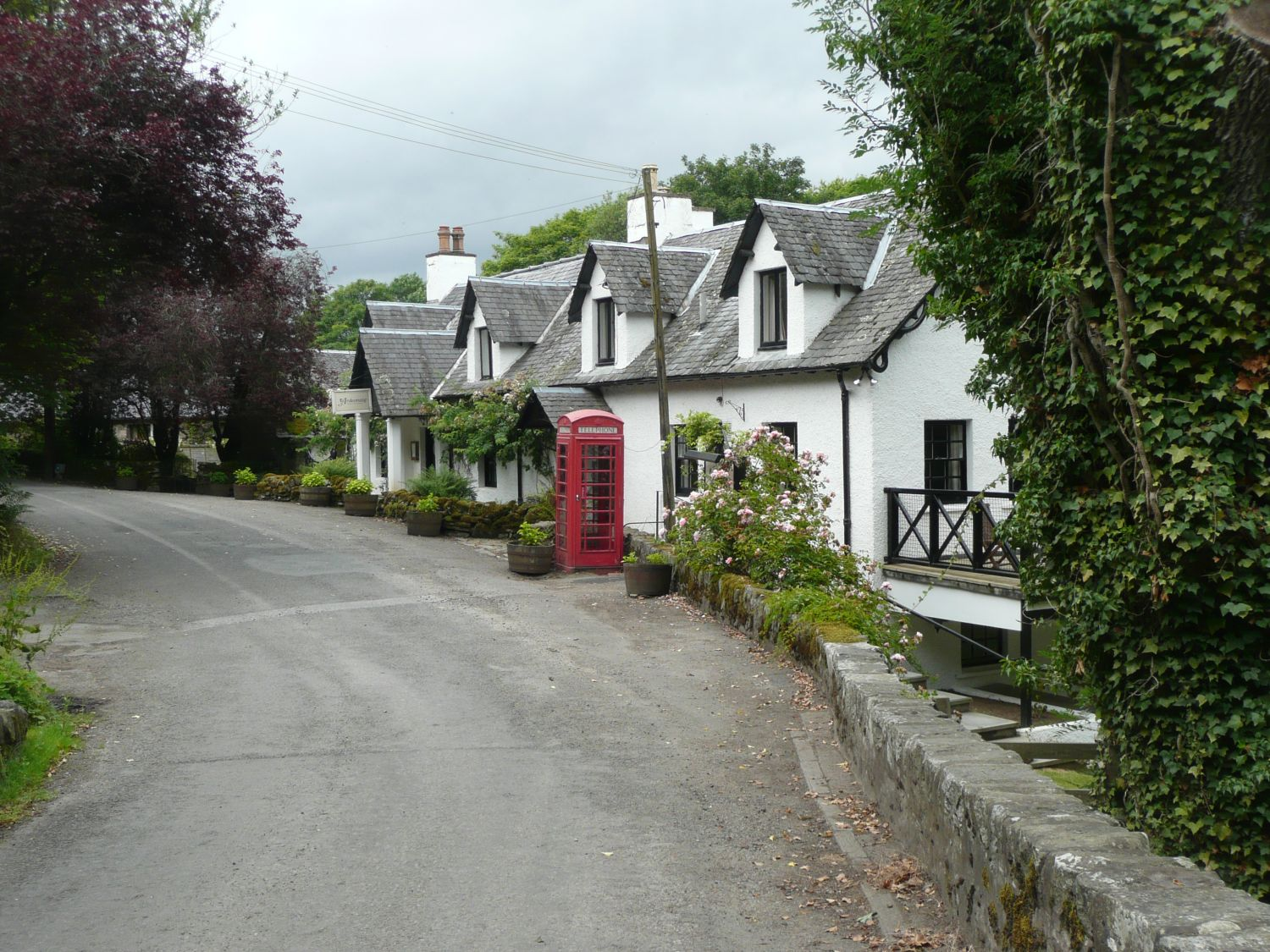
- Ardeonaig Hotel

- Location within the Stirling council area
- OS grid reference: NN669357
- Civil parish: Kenmore
- Council area: Stirling
- Lieutenancy area: Stirling and Falkirk
- Country: Scotland
- Sovereign state: United Kingdom
- Post town: Killin
- Postcode district: FK21
- Dialling code: 01567
- Police: Scotland
- Fire: Scottish
- Ambulance: Scottish
- UK Parliament: Stirling and Strathallan
- Scottish Parliament: Stirling

Ardeonaig (Scottish Gaelic: Àird Eònaig) is a hamlet on the southern shore of Loch Tay in the Stirling Council area of Scotland. It is approximately 7 miles east of Killin and lies at the mouth of the Ardeonaig Burn where it enters Loch Tay.

== History ==
When boats operated by the Loch Tay Steamboat Company ran on the loch they stopped at Ardeonaig, where coal was delivered and passengers could disembark. An outdoor activities centre operated by the Abernethy Trust was based at Brae Lodge, Ardeonaig from 1984 until its closure in 2021.
