= Croft Moraig Stone Circle =

- Croftmoraig stone circle
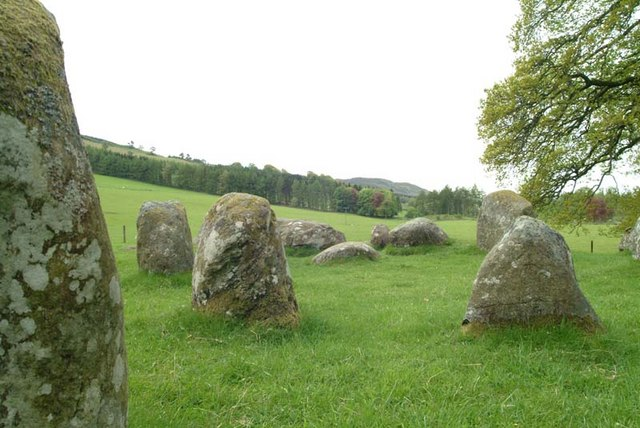
- Croft Moraig Stone Circle
- Interactive map of Croft Moraig Stone Circle
- 56.601805°N 3.960241°W
- Type: Stone circle
- Periods: Neolithic / Bronze Age
- Location: Dull, Perth and Kinross

Scheduled monument
- Official name: Croftmoraig stone circle
- Type: Prehistoric ritual and funerary: stone circle or ring; stone setting
- Designated: 28 March 1991
- Reference no.: SM5024

Croft Moraig Stone Circle (also Croftmoraig) is a prehistoric stone circle situated four miles southwest of Aberfeldy, Scotland (grid reference NN79754726). It is a scheduled monument.

== Location ==
The stone circle is situated by the side of the A827 road between Aberfeldy and Kenmore. It stands to the northeast of Loch Tay on low ground beneath steep mountainsides.

== Description ==
The stone circle is a complex multi-phase site. The stone circle shows many features typical to the area including a recumbent stone, graded circle-stones, a south-southwest orientation, quartz pebbles and an outer stoney bank. The stones are of dark grey schist.

== Excavations ==
The stone circle was excavated in 1965. It was found to have three phases of construction, the first phase being fourteen timber posts arranged in a horseshoe pattern measuring 8 metres by 7 metres. The mouth of the horseshoe had a post set just inside it, and in the centre of the horseshoe there was a boulder with some burnt bone near it. In the second phase the timber posts were replaced by a horseshoe setting of 8 standing stones, about 8 metres by 6 metres. This was surrounded by a stone bank around 17 metres in diameter. On top of the bank, to the southwest was a two-metre stone with 23 cup marks on it. In the third phase a circle of 12 standing stones about 12 metres in diameter was erected around the horseshoe. There was an entrance in the southeast marked by two external stones with two adjacent graves.

Dating evidence was provided by some sherds of pottery from phase 2 of the site, dating to around 2000 BC.

== See also ==
- Stone circles in the British Isles and Brittany
- List of stone circles
