= Fearnan =

Coordinates: 56.575880°N 4.081897°W

Fearnan: Scottish Gaelic: Feàrnan
- Location within Perth and Kinross
- OS grid reference: NN722446
- Council area: Perth and Kinross
- Country: Scotland
- Sovereign state: United Kingdom
- Post town: ABERFELDY
- Postcode district: PH15
- Dialling code: 01887
- Police: Scotland
- Fire: Scottish
- Ambulance: Scottish
- UK Parliament: Angus and Perthshire Glens
- Scottish Parliament: Perthshire North

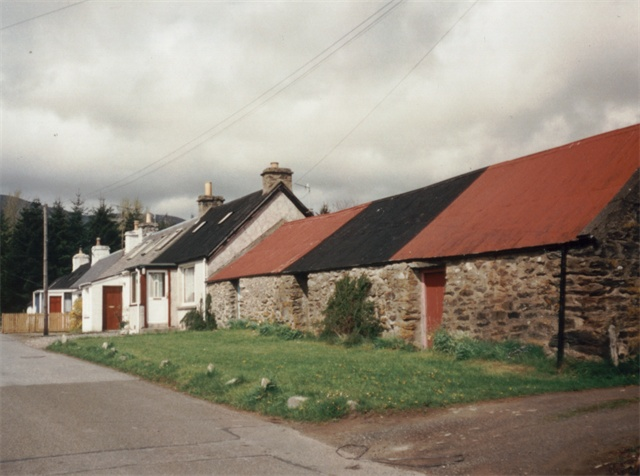
Older cottages in Fearnan

Fearnan (Gaelic Feàrnan, 'Alders') is a small crofting village on the north shore of Loch Tay in Perthshire, Scotland.

The village is known for Taymouth Castle, which is the birthplace of John Murray, 4th Earl of Dunmore.

The village lies at the junction of the road to Glen Lyon and the road between Kenmore and Killin that runs along the north side of the loch. The land around the village has at various times in history belonged to both the Robertsons of Struan and the Campbells. The village is now a mix of old crofts dating back up to 400 years and new builds mainly from the 1980s. There is also a whole hidden village of crofts with just their foundations left, just below the forestry of Drummond Hill. Visitors who wish to explore the area are encouraged to park at the village hall and walk up the field opposite, clamber over the wall and walk right, where there is a road covered in fern, then walk up the hill, and with a bit of searching they will find the remnants of the houses.

The village's only hotel, the Tigh-an-Loan, went out of business in 2008 and the building was demolished a year later. Up to the early 1970s, this loch-side hotel also ran a small garage/filling station plus the village post office. The latter moved to a new building just east of the junction for Fortingall but even that closed in 2001 and now the nearest shops are in Kenmore, 3 1/2 miles (5.5 kilometres) away. Along with several other village schools around Loch Tay, the one class village primary school (where Kate Maynard was the last teacher) closed in 1983 when a new comprehensive primary school opened in the grounds of Taymouth Castle in Kenmore. Secondary school pupils have always had to travel to Aberfeldy (10 miles or 16 kilometres from Fearnan) and that situation continues today. Across the road from the former school building lies the remains of Fearnan Pier, one of five intermediate piers served from 1882 to 1939 by the Loch Tay Steamboat Company later Caledonian (LMS) Railway's steamers plying from Killin to Kenmore and back. One novel feature at Fearnan was the collie dog belonging to the postmaster. He was trained to ring the pier bell to alert intending passengers to the imminent arrival of the steamer. The dog did this of his own accord, and also rang the bell when the steamer left the pier.

At the top of the road leading up from the lochside, 20 metres past Quarry Road (a single lane road accessing the top of the village), attached to the top of a wall on the left, is a small hollowed stone with a cross incised across its interior. This stone is a font or holy water stone from an ancient chapel, long demolished, dedicated to Saint Ciarán which once stood in or near the village, a probable early Christian site. A bronze plaque attached to the font was commissioned by the Marquess of Breadalbane to explain its history. The four cottages in the picture above are collectively called Dalchiarnan (a corruption of the Gaelic Dal Ciarán or Church of Saint Ciarán) although the second one from the camera is also now referred to as 'Grandad's Cottage' in recognition of its current owner's father who first purchased it as a weekend retreat in 1958. The nearest cottage in the picture is today the home studio of the well-known Scottish landscape and wildlife painter Keith Brockie.

The Glen Lyon road, as mentioned before, is a spur off the road to Fortingall eventually leading to main road to Rannoch/Loch Tummel and Aberfeldy.
