= Crianlarich Lower railway station =

Former railway station in Scotland

Crianlarich Lower

General information
- Location: Crianlarich, Stirling (district); Scotland
- Coordinates: 56.3926°N 4.6152°W
- Platforms: 2 (latterly 1)

Other information
- Status: Disused

History
- Original company: Callander and Oban Railway
- Pre-grouping: Callander and Oban Railway
- Post-grouping: London, Midland and Scottish Railway

Key dates
- 1 August 1873: Opened as Crianlarich
- 8 June 1953: Renamed
- 28 September 1965: Closed
Location

Crianlarich Lower was a railway station located in Crianlarich, Stirling.

== History ==
This station was opened on 1 August 1873 by the Callander and Oban Railway. It was the first railway station in Crianlarich. The station was originally laid out with two platforms, one on either side of a crossing loop. There were sidings on the south side of the station.

After the West Highland Railway opened in 1894, Crianlarich had two railway stations. The West Highland Railway crossed over the Callander and Oban Railway by means of a viaduct located a short distance west of the Lower station. The West Highland Railway's Crianlarich station was (and still is) located a short distance south of this viaduct.

On 15 November 1921, the loop and one of the platforms at Crianlarich Lower were taken out of use. The platform on the south side was retained, it being located on the same side of the railway as the village.

Following nationalisation of the railways in 1948, both stations at Crianlarich came under the ownership of British Rail. It was not until 1953 that the suffixes "Upper" and "Lower" were added to the station names.

== Signalling ==
Crianlarich signal box, which replaced the original box on 18 March 1890, was located on the Down platform. It had 14 levers.

The signal box closed on 15 November 1921 when the crossing loop was removed. The sidings were retained, access to them being controlled from a ground frame released by the single line tablet.

== Closure ==
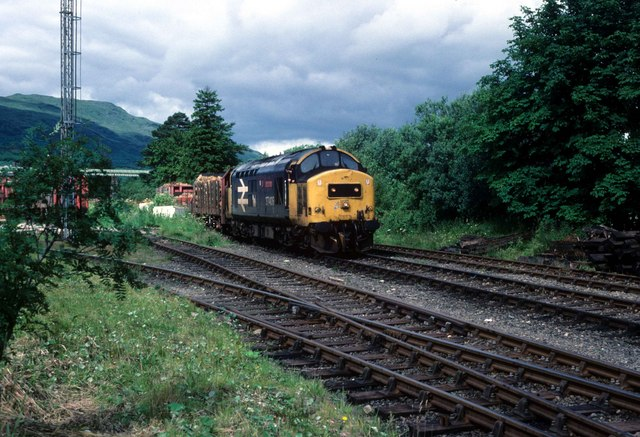
A timber train in the 1980s

Crianlarich Lower station was closed to passengers on 28 September 1965 following a landslide in Glen Ogle, however the site was used as a timber terminal for several years afterwards. The site of the station is now occupied by the Crianlarich Community Centre.

== Crianlarich Junction ==
Crianlarich Junction was situated half a mile west of Crianlarich Lower station. Opened on 20 December 1897, the junction was located at one end of a short link line that ran to Crianlarich station on the West Highland Railway.

There were two signal boxes: "Crianlarich Junction East" (32 levers) and "Crianlarich Junction West" (18 levers).

Following closure of the line east from Crianlarich Lower, the line between there and Crianlarich Junction was retained as a siding, with the link line becoming the main line for trains to and from Oban.

Preceding station	Historical railways	Following station
Luib; Line and Station closed	Callander and Oban Railway; Operated by Caledonian Railway	Tyndrum Lower; Line closed, station open
