= Killin railway station =

Former railway station in Scotland

Killin

General information
- Location: Killin, Stirling; Scotland
- Coordinates: 56.4705°N 4.3154°W
- Platforms: 1

Other information
- Status: Disused

History
- Original company: Killin Railway
- Pre-grouping: Killin Railway
- Post-grouping: London, Midland and Scottish Railway

Key dates
- 1 April 1886: Opened
- 28 September 1965: Effective closure date
- 1 November 1965: Official closure date
Location

Killin railway station was a railway station located at Killin, Stirling.

== History ==
Opened on 1 April 1886, the station comprised a single platform on the west side of the line. There were also three sidings on the same side.

A camping coach was positioned here by the Scottish Region from 1961 to 1963.

This station was officially closed on 1 November 1965, although following the Glen Ogle landslide on 27 September 1965, the service was suspended and replaced by buses until the official closure.

== Sources ==
- Hodgins, Douglas; Sanders, Keith (1993). British Railways Past and Present No 31 - North West Scotland. Kettering: Past & Present. ISBN 1-85895-090-2.
- McRae, Andrew (1998). British Railways Camping Coach Holidays: A Tour of Britain in the 1950s and 1960s. Vol. Scenes from the Past: 30 (Part Two). Foxline. ISBN 1-870119-53-3.
- Quick, Michael (2022) [2001]. Railway passenger stations in Great Britain: a chronology (PDF). version 5.04. Railway & Canal Historical Society. Archived from the original (PDF) on 25 November 2022.

| Preceding station | Historical railways | Following station |
|---|---|---|
| Loch Tay | Killin Railway | Killin Junction |
