= Falls of Acharn =

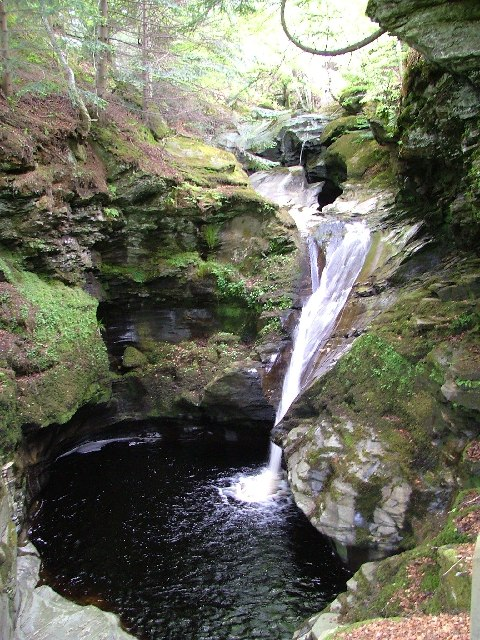
- The higher falls of Acharn, visible from a boardwalk.

- Location within Scotland
- Location: Perth and Kinross, Scotland
- Coordinates: 56.56425°N 4.02429°W
- Watercourse: Acharn Burn

The Falls of Acharn are a series of waterfalls in Scotland above the Loch Tay The lower falls are visible from the "Hermit's Cave", a folly built in the 18th century. It's thought it was built by Earl of Breadlabane, but historical evidence is thin. There is also a board walk across the higher falls. The falls were purportedly visited by Robert Burns, and William and Dorothy Wordsworth.

== See also ==
- Acharn
- Waterfalls of Scotland
