= Lochan Saorach =

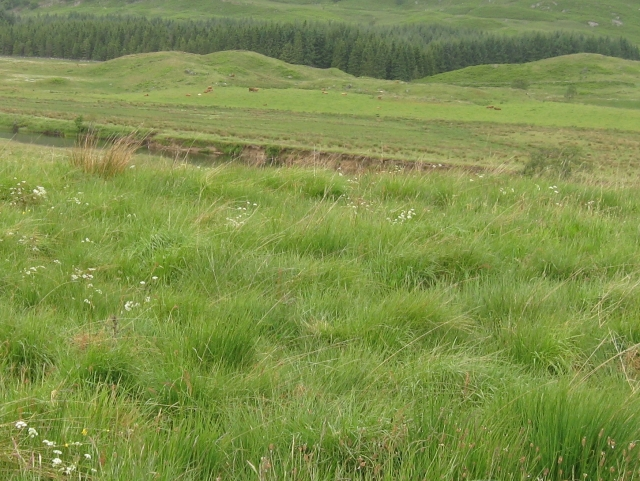
- Glen Dochart

- Location within Perth and Kinross
- Location: Glen Dochart, Perthshire, Scotland
- Coordinates: 56°24′44″N 4°30′40″W
- Type: Freshwater loch
- Primary inflows: Rainwater and surface drainage
- Basin countries: Scotland
- Max. length: 237 ft (72 m)
- Max. width: 127 ft (39 m)
- Surface area: 24,576 sq ft (2,283.2 m^{2})
- Islands: One
- Settlements: Crianlarich

Lochan Saorach or Lochan Dùn Saoraich (NN451272) is a small loch situated in Glen Dochart (Scottish Gaelic: Gleann Dochard), below Dun Saorach, Perthshire, Scottish Highlands, Scotland. The glen extends from Crianlarich eastwards to Killin with the River Dochart passing through it.

The Saorach lochan is a natural feature, roughly oval in shape, sitting across the River Dochart from the old farm of Auchessan and is notable for at one time having a floating island on it waters as recorded in 1769 in addition to a normal island.

== History ==
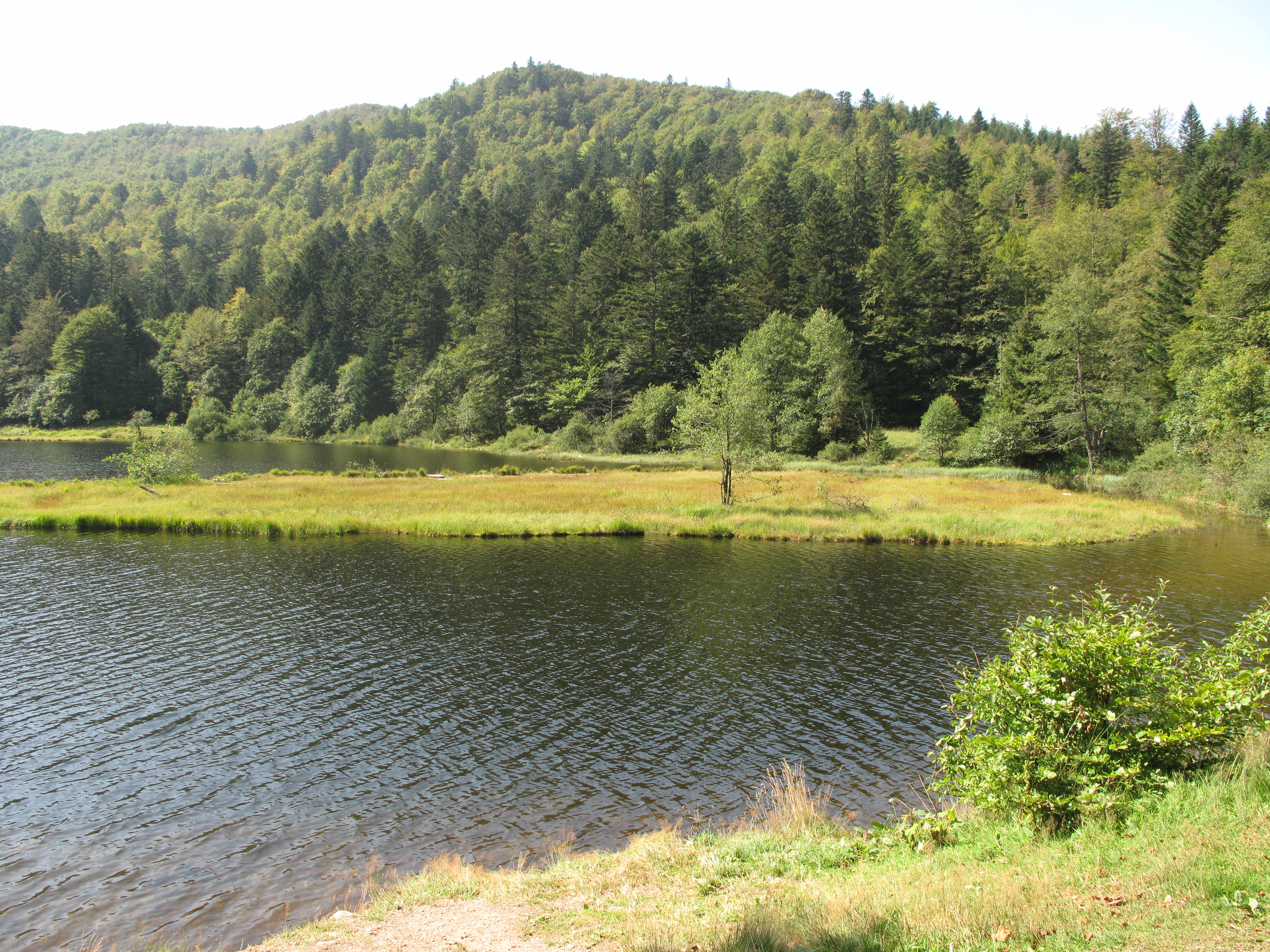
Lake Blanchemer, France - A floating island

In 1769 the antiquarian Thomas Pennant, whilst on his first tour of Scotland, recorded that "...opposite to the farm of Achessan (sic), is a lake, noted for a floting island, fifty-one feet long, and twenty-nine broad, that shifts its quarters with the wind. It has strength sufficient to carry an involuntary voyage, the cattle that might be surprised feeding on this mobile solum, deceived with the appearance of its being firm land. it cannot indeed boast of carrying on its surface the darksome groves of those on the Cutilian waters, but, like the Lydian Calamina, may be launched from the sides of the lake with poles, and can show plenty of coarse grass, some small willows, and a little birch tree."

Location of Lochan Saoroch

He goes on to record as a foot note that "The thickness of this isle is twenty-five inches. Perhaps, as Mr.Gahn affirms to be the case of other floating islands, this might have originated from the twisted roots of the Schoenus mariscus, and Scirpus caespitosus, converted into a more firm mass by the addition of the Carex caespitosus."

Schoenus mariscus is now known as swamp sawgrass (Cladium mariscus), Scirpus caespitosus is now deer grass (Trichophorum cespitosum) and Carex caespitosus is Carex cespitosa.

Auchessan Farm is recorded from at least the mid 18th century and is still occupied.

== Floating islands ==
Floating islands are also known as tussocks, floatons, or suds and are composed of exposed vegetation that grows on a buoyant base of plant roots and other organic materials. In 1745 Herman Moll recorded on his map of Loch Lomond that it was famous for its floating island. The artist George Washington Wilson (1823 - 1893) photographed the remains of a floating island in the Luss Straits at an unknown date.

Richard Franck, a Cromwellian soldier was stationed at or visited Loch Ness during the 17th century and wrote that "The famous Lough-Ness, so much discours'd for the supposed floating island; for here it is, if anywhere in Scotland. Nor is it any other than a natural plantation of segs and bullrushes, matted and knit so close together by natural industry, and navigated by winds that blow every way, floats from one part of the Lough to another, upon the surface of the solid deeps of this small Mediterrane."

Floating islands have been put forward as an explanation for sightings of the Loch Ness Monster.

== The Lochan ==
The lochan is now located within a forestry pine plantation with one island still present however the floating island is no longer extant.
