= Ardtalnaig =

Village in Perth and Kinross, Scotland

Coordinates: 56.527722°N 4.113399°W

Ardtalnaig: Scottish Gaelic: Àird Talanaig
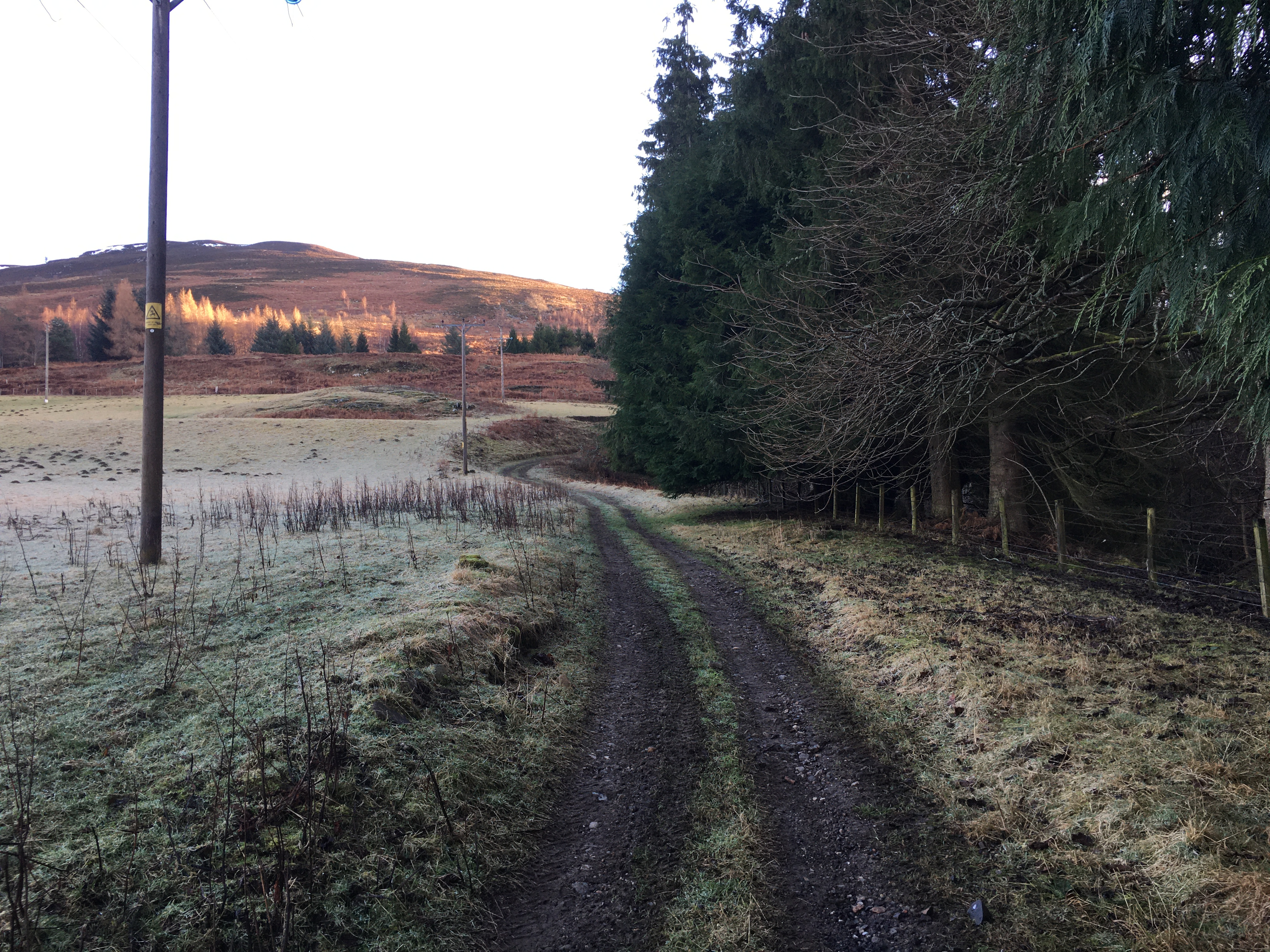
- Farm track at Ardtalnaig

- Location within Perth and Kinross
- OS grid reference: NN701393
- Council area: Perth and Kinross
- Country: Scotland
- Sovereign state: United Kingdom
- Post town: ABERFELDY
- Postcode district: PH15
- Dialling code: 01887
- Police: Scotland
- Fire: Scottish
- Ambulance: Scottish

Ardtalnaig (/ˌɑːrdˈtælnɪɡ/; Àird Talanaig) is a hamlet on the south shore of Loch Tay in Perth and Kinross in Scotland. It is approximately 6 miles (10 km) from Kenmore in whose parish it lies.

1 mile (1.6 km) to the south-west is the former gold and copper mine at Tomnadashan.

== Climate ==
The highest temperature ever recorded in Ardtalnaig was 31.4 °C (88.5 °F) on 27 June 1995. The lowest temperature ever recorded was −15.9 °C (3.4 °F) on 11 January 1982. The highest minimum temperature ever recorded was 17.5 °C (63.5 °F) on 6 August 2006 and the lowest maximum temperature ever recorded was −6.7 °C (19.9 °F) on 11 January 1963. The most precipitation ever recorded in one day was 89.6 millimetres (3.53 in) on 26 September 1981.

Climate data for Ardtalnaig 130m amsl (1991–2020)(Extremes 1963-present)
Month	Jan	Feb	Mar	Apr	May	Jun	Jul	Aug	Sep	Oct	Nov	Dec	Year
Record high °C (°F)	14.0 (57.2)	14.8 (58.6)	21.3 (70.3)	25.0 (77.0)	27.1 (80.8)	31.4 (88.5)	30.1 (86.2)	29.3 (84.7)	26.2 (79.2)	22.5 (72.5)	16.1 (61.0)	14.0 (57.2)	31.4 (88.5)
Mean daily maximum °C (°F)	6.2 (43.2)	6.8 (44.2)	9.0 (48.2)	12.0 (53.6)	15.4 (59.7)	17.6 (63.7)	19.2 (66.6)	18.6 (65.5)	16.1 (61.0)	12.1 (53.8)	8.7 (47.7)	6.5 (43.7)	12.4 (54.2)
Daily mean °C (°F)	3.6 (38.5)	4.0 (39.2)	5.5 (41.9)	7.8 (46.0)	10.6 (51.1)	13.2 (55.8)	14.9 (58.8)	14.5 (58.1)	12.4 (54.3)	9.0 (48.2)	6.0 (42.8)	3.7 (38.7)	8.8 (47.8)
Mean daily minimum °C (°F)	1.0 (33.8)	1.1 (34.0)	2.0 (35.6)	3.6 (38.5)	5.8 (42.4)	8.7 (47.7)	10.6 (51.1)	10.4 (50.7)	8.6 (47.5)	5.8 (42.4)	3.2 (37.8)	1.0 (33.8)	5.1 (41.3)
Record low °C (°F)	−15.9 (3.4)	−9.8 (14.4)	−12.2 (10.0)	−5.6 (21.9)	−2.0 (28.4)	0.6 (33.1)	3.3 (37.9)	1.7 (35.1)	−1.1 (30.0)	−4.0 (24.8)	−7.9 (17.8)	−13.4 (7.9)	−15.9 (3.4)
Average rainfall mm (inches)	197.0 (7.76)	136.2 (5.36)	116.2 (4.57)	83.3 (3.28)	79.4 (3.13)	77.7 (3.06)	78.3 (3.08)	88.4 (3.48)	101.0 (3.98)	146.8 (5.78)	157.9 (6.22)	177.3 (6.98)	1,439.5 (56.68)
Average rainy days (≥ 1.0 mm)	17.9	14.9	14.7	12.1	12.3	12.7	13.0	13.3	13.5	16.7	17.4	17.2	175.4
Source: Meteo climat
