= Tomnadashan =

Former mine in Scotland

Coordinates: 56.5147°N 4.1287°W

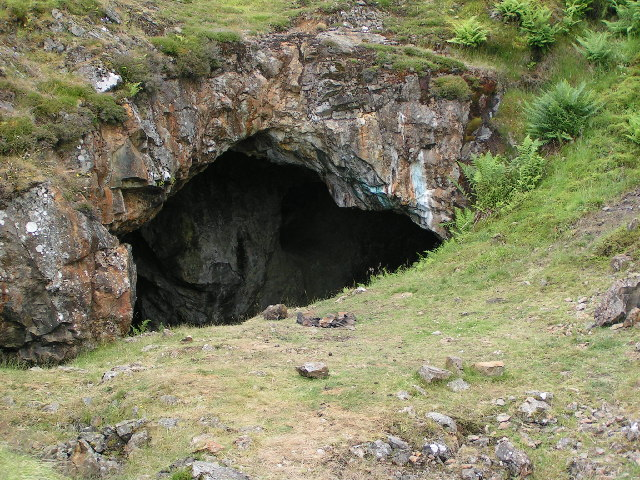
Tomnadashan Copper Mine

Tomnadashan (Scottish Gaelic: Tom na Daisein) was a hamlet southwest of Ardtalnaig in Scotland. John Campbell, 2nd Marquess of Breadalbane tried to mine copper, gold, and sulphur there in the 19th century but was unsuccessful. The copper mine is best known as the filming location for the Cave of Caerbannog scene in Monty Python and the Holy Grail.
