= Acharn, Perth and Kinross =

Hamlet in Perth and Kinross, Scotland

Coordinates: 56.568687°N 4.027786°W

Acharn: Scottish Gaelic: Àth a' Chàirn
- Location within Perth and Kinross
- OS grid reference: NN755437
- Council area: Perth and Kinross
- Country: Scotland
- Sovereign state: United Kingdom
- Post town: ABERFELDY
- Postcode district: PH15
- Dialling code: 01887
- Police: Scotland
- Fire: Scottish
- Ambulance: Scottish
- UK Parliament: Angus and Perthshire Glens
- Scottish Parliament: Perthshire North

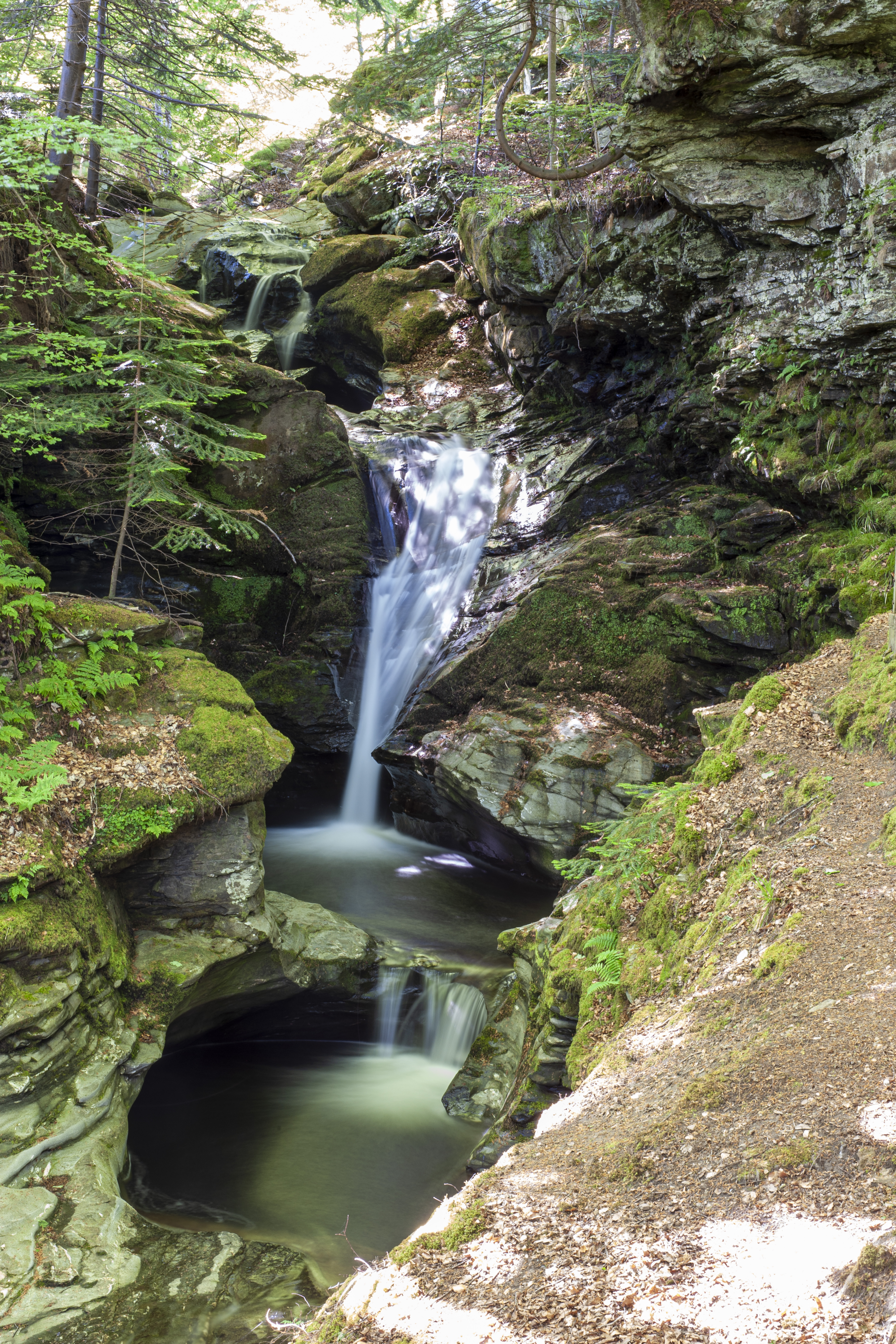
Upper Falls of Acharn

Acharn (Scottish Gaelic: Àth a' Chàirn meaning 'Field of the Cairn[s]') is a hamlet in the Kenmore parish of the Scottish council area of Perth and Kinross. It is situated on the south shore of Loch Tay close to its eastern end. The hamlet was built in the early 19th century to house workers from the surrounding estates. A watermill was constructed to harness the power of the nearby Acharn Burn, and this was converted into a craft centre in the 1970s, and later into a private residence. There is a bridge in the middle that goes over the Acharn burn.

The Falls of Acharn, a series of waterfalls with a total height of 24.5 metres (80 ft) set in a steep wooded gorge, are a popular tourist attraction on the nearby Acharn Burn south of the hamlet. The steep Acharn Falls Walk is about 1 mile (1.5 kilometres) straight up and down from the village, and is a dangerous place to walk dogs without leads, but provides scenic views of the falls above the village. The upper falls have a timber walkway constructed by the 202 Field Squadron RE (V) in June 1989. There is also Hermits Cave, possibly constructed by the Victorians as a kind of folly.

William Wordsworth is known to have visited the falls in 1803 with his sister Dorothy, who noted in her diary the "very beautiful prospect" available of Loch Tay from the falls.

Nearby is the hamlet-turned-resort of Croft-na-Caber, home to a sailing (and other watersports) park.
