= Loch Tay Steamboat Company =

1882–1921 Scottish transport company

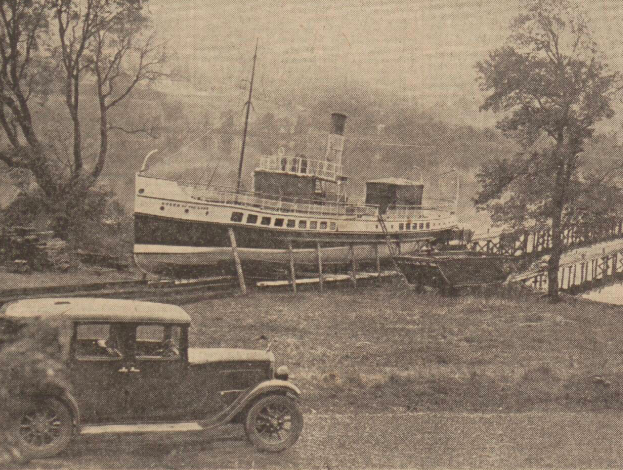
- Queen of the Lake at Kenmore (1932)
- Industry: Shipping
- Founded: 1882
- Defunct: 1921
- Fate: Taken over
- Successor: Caledonian Steam Packet Company
- Area served: Loch Tay

The Loch Tay Steamboat Company operated steamer services on Loch Tay, Scotland, from 1882 to 1921.

== Loch Tay Steamboat Company ==
In 1882, a company named the Loch Tay Steamboat Company was established by Gavin Campbell, 1st Marquess of Breadalbane, to operate steamer services on Loch Tay. The steamers operated between piers at Kenmore, Fearnan, Ardtalnaig, Ardeonaig, Lawers and Killin. The journey of 15 miles (24 km) from one end of the loch to another took around 1½ hours.

In 1893, the Loch Tay Steamboat Company became a joint-stock company with a capital of £8,000 (equivalent to £888,800 in 2025) in £10 shares. The Marquis of Breadalbane maintained control as a director.

On 19 July 1907, a new twin-screw steamer Queen of the Lake was launched by the Marchioness of Breadalbane.

One novel feature at Fearnan was the collie dog belonging to the postmaster. He was trained to ring the pier bell to alert intending passengers to the imminent arrival of the steamer. The dog did this of his own accord, and also rang the bell when the steamer left the pier.

The pre-First World War traffic did not return after 1918. There was improved communication along the north side of Loch Tay with improvements to the road and in 1921 the company went into liquidation.

== Caledonian Steam Packet Company control ==
The Caledonian Steam Packet Company took over responsibility from 1922 and operated services up to 1939. The livery changed from the red with a black top to the Caledonian yellow and then the yellow-red-black combination in the initial period of London Midland and Scottish Railway eventually changing to a buff funnel with black top.

Services operated until the outbreak of the Second World War in 1939, and never resumed afterwards.

== Vessels operated by the companies ==
=== Lady of the Lake ===
The Lady of the Lake was designed and constructed in iron by Anderson and Lyall of Govan. She was disassembled, and transported in sections to Acharn where a temporary slip was erected. She was 110 feet (34 m) in length with a breadth of 14 feet (4.3 m) and a gross weight of 67 long tons (68,000 kg). She was certificated to carry over 200 passengers. The engines by David Rowan of Glasgow generated 150 horse-power, supplied by a steel boiler, and delivered a speed expected of 14 m.p.h. She was launched by the Countess of Breadalbane on 15 July 1882.

During a storm in January 1884 she was blown ashore and the service was suspended until she could be re-floated.

Lady of the Lake was refitted for the 1922 season. She was scrapped at Kenmore in 1929.

=== Magpie ===
A small cargo steamer built in wood in 1882. She was lost in a storm in 1907

=== Sybilla ===
A cargo vessel constructed in 1882 of larch from Drummond Hill. She was 70 feet (21 m) long, with a keel length of 60 feet (18 m), and breadth of 14 feet (4.3 m). She had a gross weight of 36 long tons (37,000 kg). She was built by James Fenton of Perth and fitted with engines similar to those of Lady of the Lake. She was named after Sybilla of Normandy, queen of Alexander I of Scotland, who is buried among the ruins of the Priory on the Isle of Loch Tay. She was launched on 13 July 1882. She was given the contract by the Royal Mail to operate a postal service along the loch.

She was scrapped at Kenmore in 1929.

=== Carlotta ===
A cargo vessel with very limited passenger capacity which was designed by G.L. Watson and launched on 19 June 1883 as a general purpose vessel by Mrs. Sinclair of Kenmore. She took her name from the third name of the Countess of Breadalbane. She was designed by G.L. Watson of Glasgow and built by A.G. Gifford of Leith. Her boiler and engines were supplied by Ross & Duncan of Govan. She was 68.5 feet (20.9 m) long and 11 feet (3.4 m) in breadth and had a gross weight of 22 long tons (22,000 kg).

In 1887 she was used for a trip by Albert, King of Saxony, and his entourage. She was disposed of in 1923.

=== Queen of the Lake ===
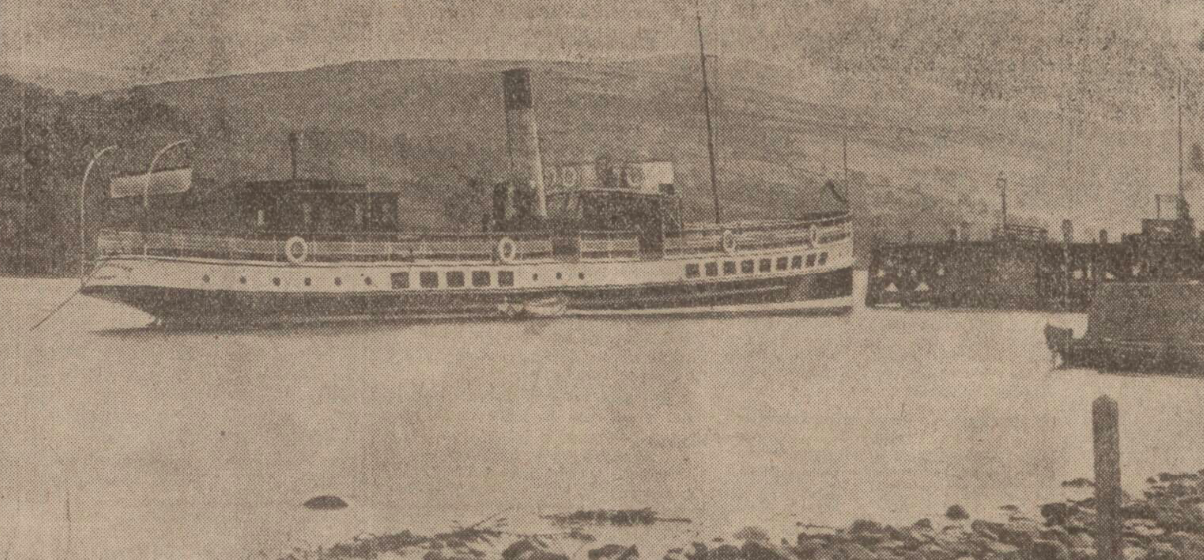
The Queen of the Lake on Loch Tay from the Dundee Evening Telegraph, 4 July 1929

Queen of the Lake was built by Ailsa Shipbuilding Company of Troon. She was shipped in parts to Killin and drawn on a barge to Dalreb near Kenmore before reassembly and launching on 19 June 1907 by the Marchioness of Breadalbane. She measured 110 feet (34 m) long by 20 feet (6.1 m) in the beam and was in many respects an improved version of Lady of the Lake. Her gross weight was 152 long tons (154,000 kg). Some adjustments were required and she completed her trials on 13 August, running the length of the loch at a rate of 12 knots. She had “accommodation for over 500 passengers with a fine deck room, and commodious handsomely furnished saloons.”

Tragedy almost struck when Queen of the Lake was discovered to be on fire at the beginning of July in 1929. The cabin was gutted and part of her deck damaged but she was repaired and returned to service. Queen of the Lake soldiered on with two double runs each day and evening cruises in the height of the season.

She was removed from the water in 1939 at Kenmore and broken up in 1950 where she lay by the firm of J & A White of North Queensferry.
