= Rabbit of Caerbannog =

Fictional animal in the film Monty Python and the Holy Grail

- Monty Python character
- The Killer Rabbit, with bloodied mouth, in battle against the knights of King Arthur (himself left) in Holy Grail, jumping to attack Lancelot (right)
- First appearance: Monty Python and the Holy Grail (3 April 1975)
- Last appearance: Spamalot
- Created by: Monty Python and Eric Idle

In-universe information
- Species: Rabbit

The Rabbit of Caerbannog (/kɛərˈbænɒɡ/), often referred to in popular culture as the Killer Rabbit, is a fictional character who first appeared in the 1975 comedy film Monty Python and the Holy Grail by the Monty Python comedy troupe, a parody of King Arthur's quest for the Holy Grail. The character was created by Monty Python members Graham Chapman and John Cleese, who wrote the sole scene in which it appears in the film; it is not based on any particular Arthurian lore, although there had been examples of killer rabbits in medieval literature. It makes a similar appearance in the 2004 musical Spamalot, based on the film.

== Origin ==
The Killer Rabbit appears in a major set piece battle towards the end of Holy Grail, when Arthur and his knights reach the Cave of Caerbannog, having been warned that it is guarded by a ferocious beast. They mock the warning when they discover what looks to be a common, harmless rabbit, but are brutally forced into retreat by the innocent-looking creature, who injures many of Arthur's knights and even kills several before being killed in return by Arthur, who uses a holy weapon, the Holy Hand Grenade of Antioch, to blow up the beast.

The "Killer Rabbit scene" is largely regarded as having achieved iconic status, and it is considered one of Monty Python's most famous gags; it has been referenced and parodied many times in popular culture, and it was important in establishing the viability of Spamalot. Despite its limited screentime, several publications have acknowledged the Rabbit of Caerbannog as one of the best and most famous fictional bunnies in film history.

=== In the film ===
The Cave of Caerbannog, home of the Legendary Black Beast of Arrrghhh, is guarded by a monster, whose nature is initially unknown. Tim the Enchanter (John Cleese) leads King Arthur (Graham Chapman) and his knights to the cave, where they must face its guardian beast. Tim prosaically details a terrible monster that has killed everyone who has tried to enter the cave and warns them, "... for death awaits you all with nasty, big, pointy teeth!"

As the knights approach the cave, their "horses" become nervous, forcing the knights to "dismount". Although the entrance is surrounded by the bones of "full fifty men", Arthur and his knights are puzzled when they see a rabbit emerge from the cave. King Arthur asks, "What, behind the rabbit?" Tim says, "It IS the rabbit!" After mocking Tim for frightening them ("You manky Scots git!") and ignoring his subsequent warnings ("Look, that rabbit's got a vicious streak a mile wide! It's a killer!"), King Arthur orders Sir Bors (Terry Gilliam) to chop off the rabbit's head.

As Bors draws his sword and confidently approaches it, the rabbit suddenly leaps directly at Bors' armoured neck, biting clean through it in a single motion, decapitating him to the sound of a can opener. Despite that initial shock, the knights attack, but the rabbit also kills Gawain and Ector and wounds several other knights.

Arthur panics and shouts for the knights to retreat ("Run away! Run away!"), to the sound of Tim's raucous laughter. As the remaining knights regroup, Sir Robin asks if "running away more" would confuse it, and Sir Galahad suggests taunting the rabbit to cause it to make a mistake. Sir Lancelot (John Cleese) asks, "Have we got bows?" ("No", says Arthur), but then Lancelot recalls, "We have the Holy Hand Grenade!"

=== Holy Hand Grenade of Antioch ===
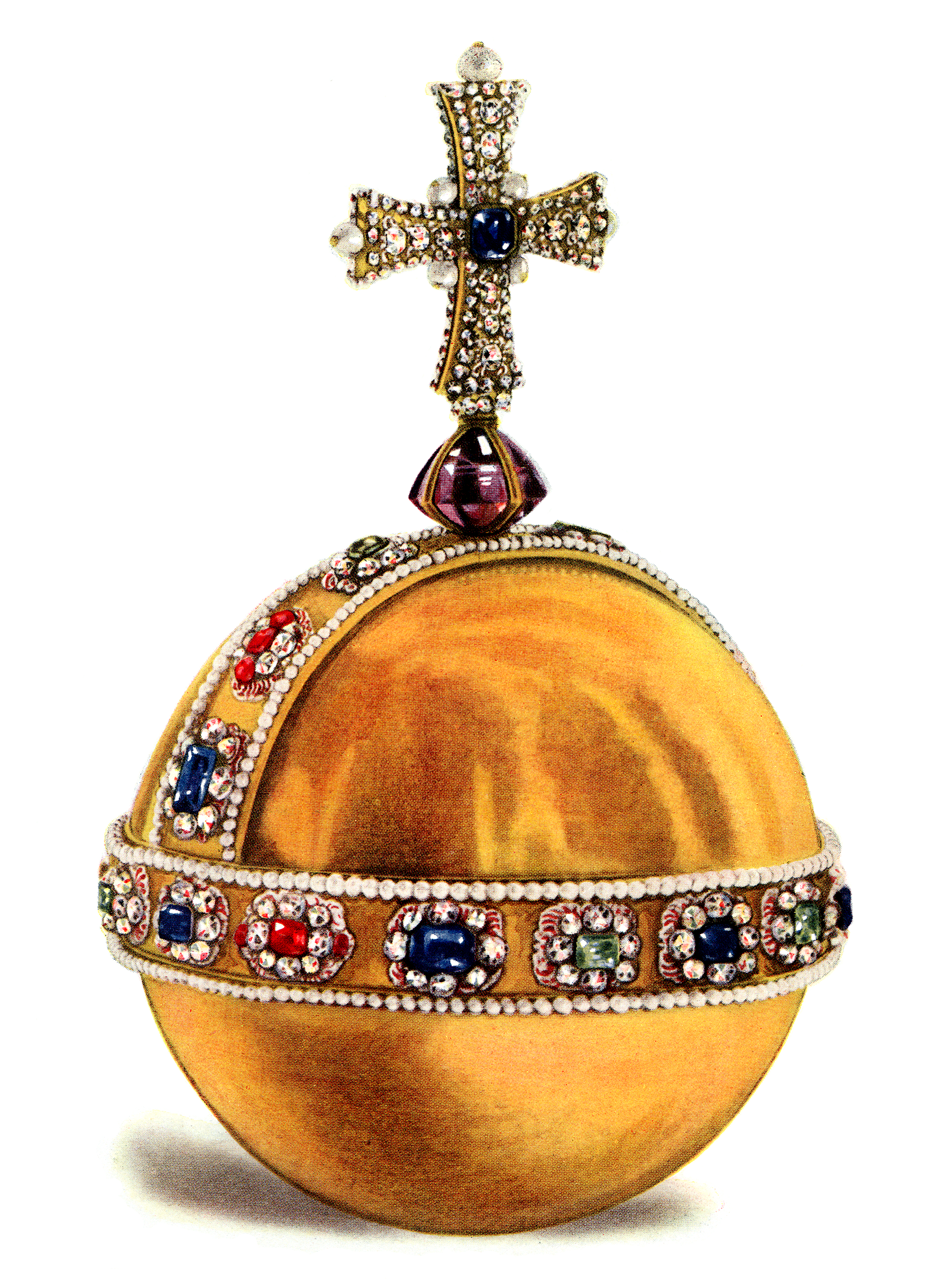
The Sovereign's Orb of the United Kingdom, which The Holy Hand Grenade of Antioch satirises

The Holy Hand Grenade of Antioch is a visual satire in the form of a globus cruciger of the Sovereign's Orb of the United Kingdom, and it may refer to the mythical Holy Spear of Antioch. The Holy Hand Grenade, described as a "sacred relic" is carried by Brother Maynard (Eric Idle). Despite its ornate appearance and long-winded instructions, it functions much the same as any other hand grenade, with a safety pin. At King Arthur's prompting, instructions for its use are read aloud by a cleric (Michael Palin) from the fictitious Book of Armaments, Chapter 2, verses 9–21, parodying the King James Bible and the Athanasian Creed:

...And Saint Attila raised the hand grenade up on high, saying, "O LORD, bless this Thy hand grenade, that with it Thou mayest blow Thine enemies to tiny bits, in Thy mercy." And the LORD did grin, and the people did feast upon the lambs and sloths and carp and anchovies and orangutans and breakfast cereals, and fruit bats and large chu... [At this point, the friar is urged by Brother Maynard to "skip a bit, brother"]... And the LORD spake, saying, "First shalt thou take out the Holy Pin. Then shalt thou count to three, no more, no less. Three shall be the number thou shalt count, and the number of the counting shall be three. Four shalt thou not count, neither count thou two, excepting that thou then proceed to three. Five is right out! Once the number three, being the third number, be reached, then lobbest thou thy Holy Hand Grenade of Antioch towards thy foe, who, being naughty in My sight, shall snuff it."

Arthur then pulls the pin, holds up the Holy Hand Grenade and counts "One! Two! Five!" Sir Galahad (also Palin) corrects him: "Three, sir!" (Arthur's innumeracy is a running gag in the picture). Arthur then yells "Three!" and hurls the grenade towards the rabbit. The grenade soars through the air—accompanied by a short bit of angelic choral a cappella—bounces, and blows up the killer rabbit. The hapless knights errant continue on their quest, but the sound of the explosion also attracts the attention of policemen who are investigating the murder of a historian by a mounted knight earlier in the film.

== Production ==
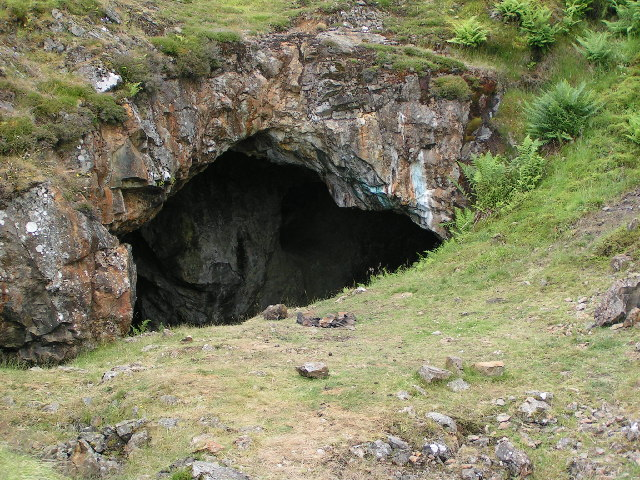
Tomnadashan copper mine

The rabbit was portrayed in the movie by both a real rabbit and a puppet. The scene was shot outside the Tomnadashan mine, a cave four miles (6.4 km) from the Perthshire village of Killin. For the 25th-anniversary DVD, Michael Palin and Terry Jones returned to be interviewed in front of the cave but they could not remember the location.

The name "Caerbannog", though fictitious, does reference real-world Welsh naming traditions: the element caer means 'castle', as in Caerdydd (Cardiff) and Caerphilly, and bannog can have a variety of meanings, the most apposite here being "turreted". The place-name set precedent just a couple of years before the film: In Mary Stewart's 1973 The Hollow Hills, the second volume of her Arthurian Saga, there is a small, craggy island (she does call it "turreted") known as Caer Bannog, where 14-year-old Arthur, still under the care of Sir Ector, finds and takes the sword Excalibur.

== Analysis ==
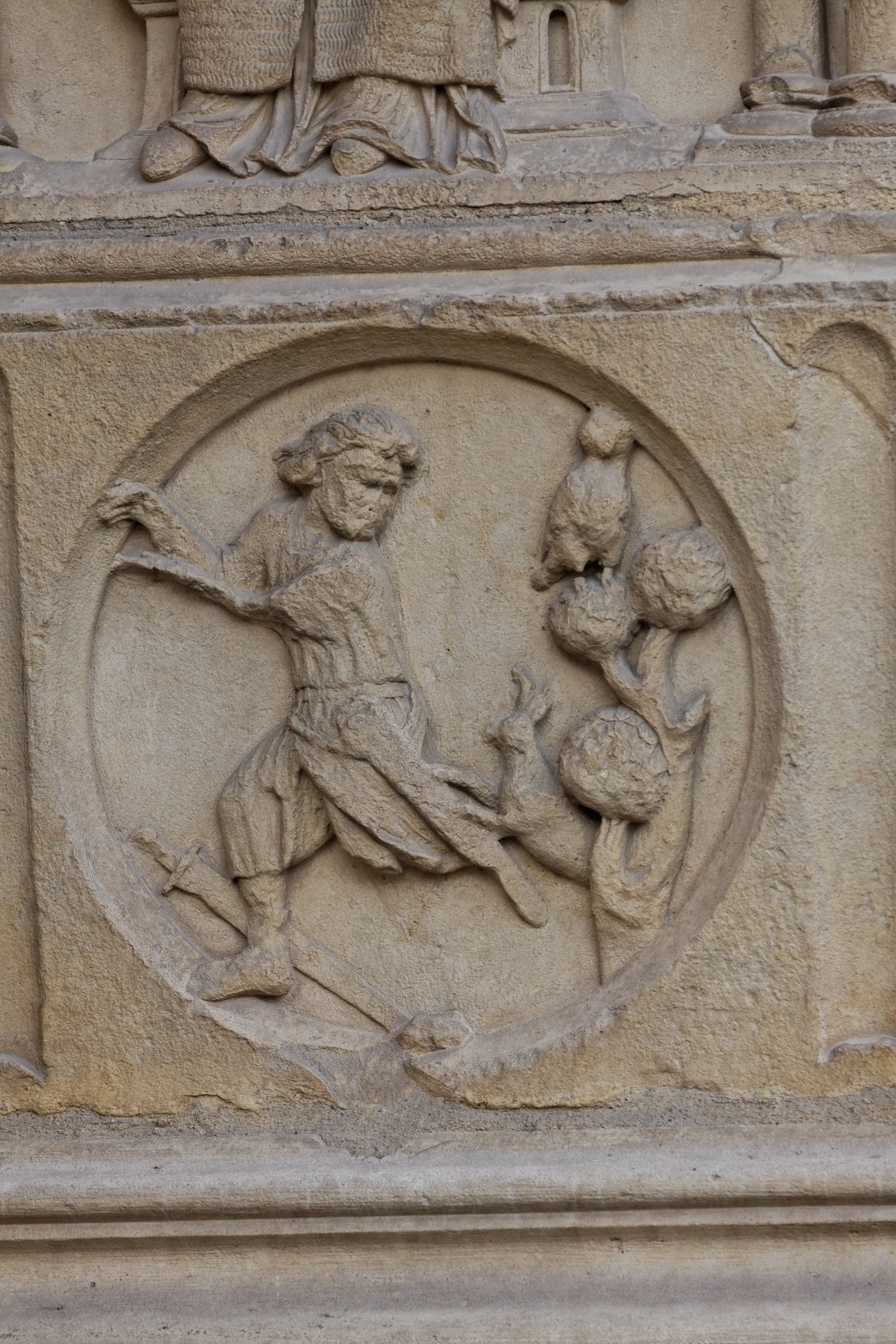
The façade of Notre Dame inspired the movie

Killer rabbits are a medieval literary tradition, and rabbits sought justice against the hunters in the margins of illuminated manuscripts at least as early as the 1170s. A killer rabbit appears in an early tale of Roman de Renart in which a fox takes hubristic pride in defeating a ferocious hare:

Si li crachai enmi le vis
Et escopi par grant vertu

Translation:

So I spat in the middle of his face
And I insulted him with great ardour

The idea of the rabbit in the Monty Python movie was inspired by the façade of Notre Dame de Paris, which depicts the weakness of cowardice with a knight fleeing from a rabbit.

Arthurian legend often had the King and knights pursuing odd and dangerous fabulous creatures such as the Twrch Trwyth and the Questing Beast. In "Humor, Romance, Horror and Epic in Text and Film of Arthurian Legend Adaptations", Khanh Le describes many ways in which the movie parodies the conventions of chivalry, courage, and authority. "The scene is only a mock chase, quest and game of the beast." When they have used the Holy Hand Grenade, the story moves on to the next adventure. "The knights do not learn how to solve their problem, the nontraditional plot occurs where the problem magically disappears."

== Reception and legacy ==
The rabbit has been reproduced in the form of merchandise associated with the movie or musical. Such items include cuddly toys, (Note: Writer David Wilson of The Vintage News described how he sought and found the so-called Cave of Caerbannog in 2017, and humorously reported, "In one of the best surprises of the day, a white rabbit was there to greet me. Someone had left a toy bunny to guard the entrance to the cave. ... Using Twitter, I sent a picture of the bunny to Python member Eric Idle, who seemed to find it amusing and sweet. In the movie, the forefront of the rabbit cave is strewn with the bones of its previous victims. Someone had attempted to re-create the effect with various remnants of local wildlife, which created a fun effect." [Photos of the stuffed white rabbit here.]) slippers and staplers. The plush killer rabbit was rated the second-geekiest plush toy of all time by Matt Blum of the GeekDad blog on Wired.com, coming second to the plush Cthulhu.

The rabbit was declared the top movie bunny by David Cheal in The Daily Telegraph. It also ranked high in an Easter 2008 poll to establish Britain's best movie rabbit, coming third to Roger Rabbit and Frank from Donnie Darko. (Note: Frank from Donnie Darko is not actually a rabbit, although he is generally referred to as such; he is a young man wearing a Halloween costume which looks like a demonic rabbit. In a famous exchange of dialogue, Donnie asks, "Why are you wearing that stupid bunny suit?" and Frank replies, "Why are you wearing that stupid man suit?" Actor James Duval, who played Frank, told an interviewer in a 15-year retrospective that Frank was inspired by director Richard Kelly's love of the novel Watership Down, about a group of rabbits in search of a home.)

Killer rabbits are sometimes used as a metaphor to say that an ostensibly harmless thing is in fact deadly. Such hidden but real risks may even arise from similarly cuddly animals. The humour of the scene comes from this inversion of the usual framework by which safety and danger are judged. Four years after the release of the movie, the press widely used the term killer rabbit to describe a swamp rabbit that "attacked" then-U.S. President Jimmy Carter as he was fishing on a farm pond.

=== Video games ===
- In the sandbox game Minecraft, an unused "Killer Bunny" can be summoned via an in-game console command. Unlike normal rabbits, it is aggressive towards the player.
- In the RPG Fallout: New Vegas, three grenades called "Holy Frag Grenade" can be found in a town called Camp Searchlight. There is nearby a wooden box with a text written on it: "Holy hand grenades. Pull pin and count to ~~5~~ 3".
- In the role-playing game Blue Archive, the fourth volume of the main story is named "Rabbit of Caerbannog", which the main characters consist of Tsukiyuki Miyako, Sorai Saki, Kasumizawa Miyu, and Kazekura Moe, who are the members of RABBIT Platoon from now-defunct SRT Special Academy.
- In the role-playing game Dragon's Crown, the second boss of the Lost Woods is called Killer Rabbit, and is depicted as a simple white rabbit. Its attacks are extremely powerful, including an instant kill move. If the player takes too long to defeat the Killer Rabbit, a platoon of knights attempts to fight the rabbit in the player's stead. The player can then collect bombs and throw them into the fight, a reference to the Holy Hand Grenade. Also in the Lost Woods is a forest hermit who bears a striking resemblance to Tim the Enchanter.
- The "vorpal bunny" is featured as a recurring enemy in the Wizardry franchise depicted as a white rabbit, sometimes covered in blood.

=== Technology ===
- In Apple Inc.'s iOS system, Siri may say that the "Rabbit of Caerbannog" is its favourite animal when asked.
- When a Tesla Model 3 is named "the rabbit of Caerbannog", a link to the Monty Python YouTube channel in the Tesla Theatre will appear.

== See also ==
- List of fictional rabbits and hares
- Killer Bunnies and the Quest for the Magic Carrot
- Killer Bunnies (dance project)
- Night of the Lepus
- Wallace & Gromit: The Curse of the Were-Rabbit
