= Glen Dochart =

Glen in Perthshire, Scotland

Coordinates: 56.417°N 4.433°W

Glen Dochart (Scottish Gaelic: Gleann Dochard) in Perthshire, Scottish Highlands is a glen which runs from Crianlarich eastwards to Killin, following the course of the River Dochart as it flows through Loch Dochart and Loch Iubhair. It is met by Glen Ogle (Scottish Gaelic: Gleann Ogail) at Lix Toll. Lochan Saorach lies within the glen and was once famous for its Floating island.

== Notable people ==
- Rev Prof Daniel Dewar born and raised here
