= Loch Tay =

Freshwater loch in the central highlands of Scotland

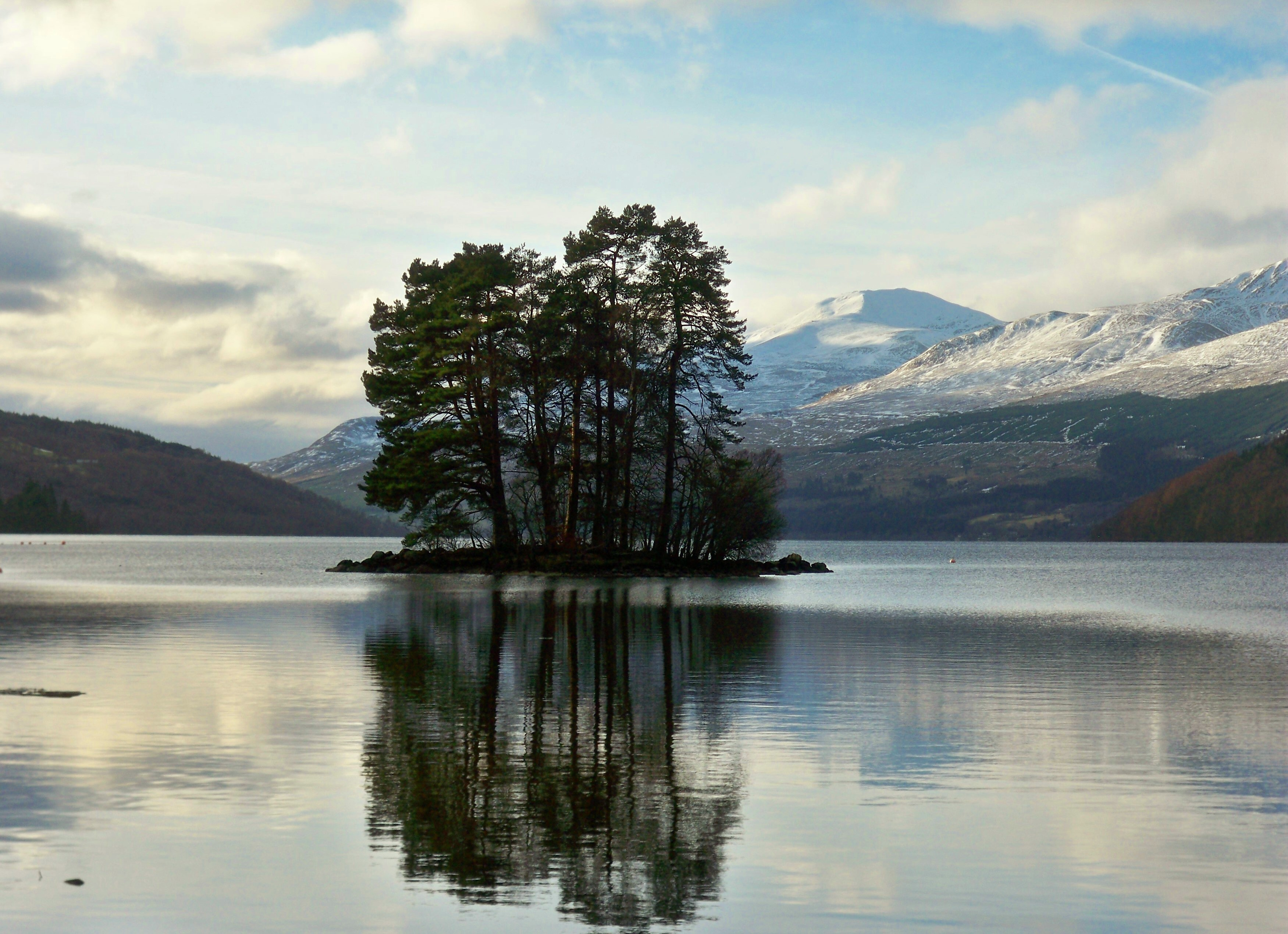
- Loch Tay and Ben Lawers

- Location within Perth and Kinross
- Location: Perthshire, Scotland
- Coordinates: 56°30′56″N 4°08′46″W
- Lake type: Loch
- Primary inflows: Dochart, Lochay
- Primary outflows: River Tay
- Catchment area: 232 mi^{2} (600 km^{2})
- Basin countries: United Kingdom
- Max. length: 14.55 mi (23.42 km)
- Max. width: 0.7 mi (1.1 km)
- Surface area: 10.19 mi^{2} (26.4 km^{2})
- Average depth: 60.66 m (199.0 ft)
- Max. depth: 154.8 m (508 ft)
- Water volume: 1.6 km^{3} (0.38 cu mi)
- Shore length^{1}: 54 km (34 mi)
- Surface elevation: 102 m (335 ft)
- Islands: 7
- Settlements: Killin, Kenmore, Lawers, Ardeonaig
- ^{1} Shore length is not a well-defined measure.

Loch Tay (Scottish Gaelic: Loch Tatha) is a freshwater loch in the central highlands of Scotland, in the Perth and Kinross and Stirling council areas, the largest body of fresh water in Perth and Kinross. The watershed of Loch Tay traditionally formed the historic province of Breadalbane.

It is a long, narrow loch about 14.55 miles (23.42 km) long, and typically around 1 to 1.5 miles (1.6 to 2.4 km) wide, following the line of the strath from the south-west to north-east. It is the sixth-largest loch in Scotland by area and more than 150 metres (490 ft) deep at its deepest.

== Pre-history and archaeology ==
Between 1996 and 2005, a large-scale project was carried out to investigate the heritage and archaeology of Loch Tay, the Ben Lawers Historic Landscape (BLHL) Project. It took place primarily on the National Trust for Scotland’s property but included some local landowners who held the agricultural lands between the head-dyke and the loch-shore.

=== Mesolithic period ===
Before 1996 the earliest known evidence for occupation along the shores of Loch Tay had been a nearby stone-axe factory at Creag an Caillich and the 1965 excavations of the stone circle at Croft Moraig (dated to the 3rd to 2nd millennium BC). However, the BLHL project found a lithic scatter along the Ben Lawers Nature Trail that dated to the 8th and 7th millennia BC, during Scotland's Mesolithic period. This and another Mesolithic site found during the project were very important to archaeologists' understanding of that time period in Scotland. Until the 1990s most Mesolithic sites were recorded along the coasts and these sites were the first ones recorded in the uplands of the Highlands, demonstrating that the hunter and gatherers of that time did not strictly live by the coasts.

=== Neolithic and Bronze Ages ===
The BLHL project also found evidence of people living and working in the hills above the loch during the Neolithic period. A Beaker burial was also found, the Balnahanaid Beaker, which may be among the earliest Beakers in Scotland, dating to a time when their use was rare.

==== Prehistoric environment and loch levels ====
Investigations of the loch have found that a Neolithic woodland existed on its edge for at least 900 years and that during that period the shoreline would have been least 4–5m lower than it is today.

=== Iron Age ===
Several of the 20 crannogs found along Loch Tay have been radiocarbon dated to the Iron Age:

- Morenish Crannog 50 BC – AD 220
- Morenish Boathouse Crannog 750 BC – AD 30
- Milton Morenish Crannog 810 – 390 BC
- Eilean Breaban Crannog AD 420–640 & 600–400 BC (two occupations)
- Tombreck Crannog 170BC–AD180

As well as round houses that were excavated at Croftvellich and Tombreck which the archeologists took to indicate that settlements may have been much more densely concentrated during the Iron Age than was previously thought, with people living both on the land and on the water.

=== Early historic ===
The loch appears to have been at the edge of Pictland. An Early Christian graveyard at Balnahanaid was found, as well as some upland occupation sites. Furthermore, there is evidence that Eilean Breaban, Dall North and Craggan Crannogs were occupied during this period, but overall Loch Tay was not a major centre of Pictish activity.

=== Medieval ===
In the early medieval period people began to cultivate the higher elevations of the hills around the loch. The Macnabs, the Menzies, the Drummonds, the Napiers, the Haldanes, the MacGregors and the Robertsons of Carwhin and Strowan all owned land around the loch but little remains of their possible castles/manors. Most of the surviving lordly residences are associated with the Glenorchy Campbells, who grew in power and influence during the 15th and early 16th centuries, specifically those at Lawers, Carwhin and Edramucky.

=== Post-medieval and modern ===
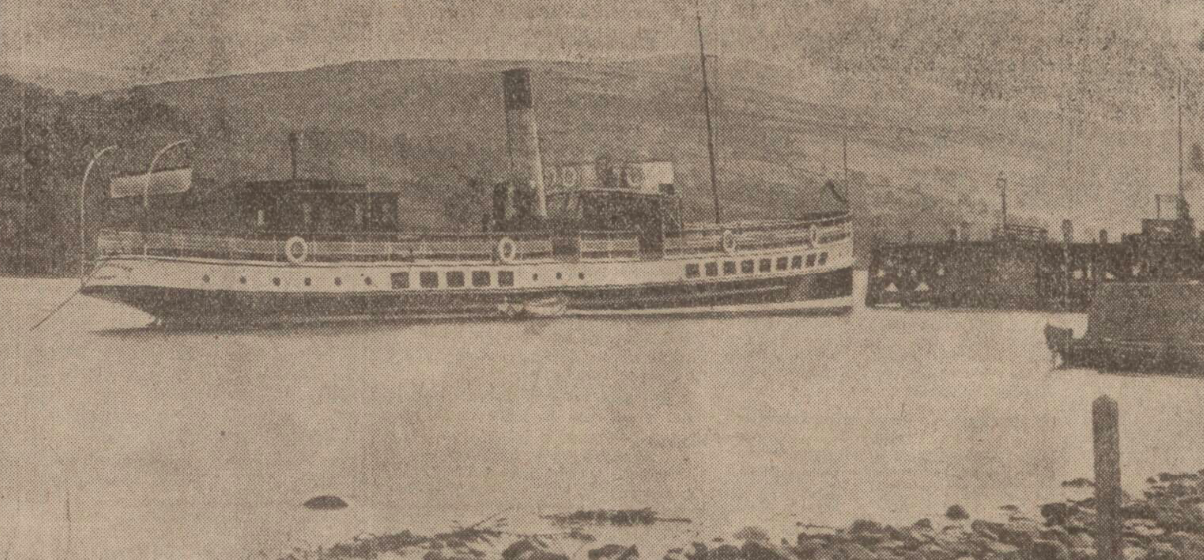
The Queen of the Lake from the Dundee Evening Telegraph Thursday 04 July 1929

The Campbells held most of the land in the area from around the 1600s to the late 1800s, when they began to sell off the land. Though before doing so they undertook clearances of the residents. It is estimated that two-thirds of the population was removed from around the loch. The National Trust for Scotland would buy a significant amount of the land in the 1950s to become the largest landowner in the area.

From 1882 to 1939 the Loch Tay Steamboat Company and then the Caledonian Steam Packet Company provided a passenger and cargo service on the loch with 5 steamers.

== Scottish Crannog Centre ==
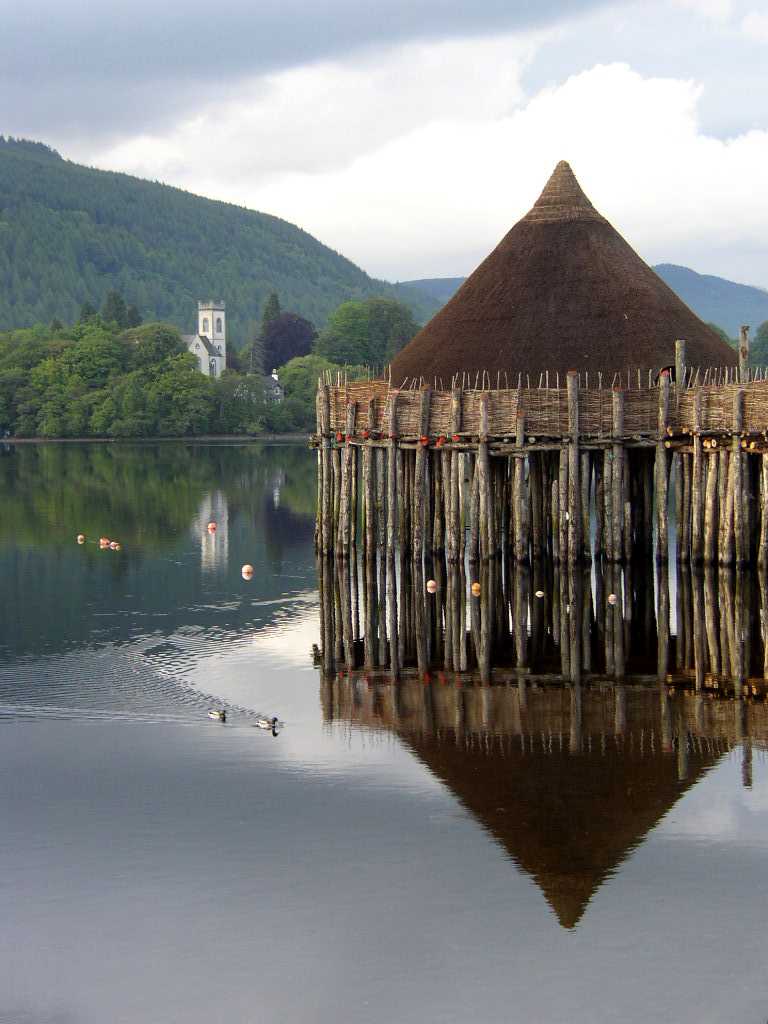
Reconstructed crannóg on Loch Tay

More than 20 crannogs have been identified in Loch Tay. The Scottish Crannog Centre is an open-air museum on the south of Loch Tay and has a reconstructed crannog, built between 1994 and 1997. The recreated Iron Age roundhouse was destroyed by fire in 2021. The museum is raising money for its repair.

== Geography ==
Ben Lawers, on the north shore of the loch is, at 1,214 metres (3,983 ft), the tenth-highest mountain in the British Isles, and is the highest peak in a group of seven munros. Killin at the head of the loch, and Kenmore at the outflow of the River Tay, are the main settlements on the lochside today. The smaller settlements of Acharn, Ardeonaig and Ardtalnaig are located on the south side of the loch whilst Fearnan and Lawers are on the north side. The loch is fed by the rivers Dochart and Lochay at its head and numerous smaller streams.

== Geology ==
The southern margin of Loch Tay hosts several metallic mineral deposits, some of which are still commercially important in the present day. Around Aberfeldy, Neoproterozoic SEDEX deposits have been extracted since the 1970s at the Foss and Duntanlich mines. Copper and silver were mined at Tomnadashan and Coire Buidhe by the Earl of Breadalbane in the 19th century. In recent decades, multiple gold-bearing vein systems have been discovered in the metasedimentary rocks belonging to the Dalradian Supergroup. Research has indicated a genetic link between Siluro-Devonian magmatism (430-390 Ma) in the region and the occurrence of gold mineralization. Movements along major structures (such as the NE trending Loch Tay Fault, or the Highland Boundary Fault) led to transtension and facilitated the emplacement of the intrusions. Fluids emanating from the subsurface intrusions mixed progressively with lithologies in the metasedimentary package to create a hybridized ore-forming fluid. Gold-bearing veins of commercial interest include Lead Trial, the Glen Almond Vein, and the cluster of mineralized veins within the Calliachar-Urlar burns.

== Railway ==
Loch Tay railway station was on the Killin Railway. It is now closed.

== In popular culture ==
Media outlets reported in June 2024 that the loch had been temporarily renamed to "Loch Tay Tay" as a tribute to the American singer-songwriter Taylor Swift touring in Scotland as part of the Eras Tour.

The loch is a popular spot for salmon fishing, and many of its surroundings feature in the traditional Scottish 'Loch Tay Boat Song' (Scottish Gaelic, Iorram Loch Tatha). This is a very sad song in which the protagonist muses on unrequited love for a red-haired woman (a Nighean ruadh) whilst rowing at the end of a working day. It has been recorded by Liam Clancy and The Corries amongst others.

The film Monty Python and the Holy Grail filmed the famous scene with the Killer Rabbit of Caerbannog at Tomnadashan Mine on the east bank of the loch.
