= Kenmore, Perth and Kinross =

Coordinates: 56.5852°N 3.9988°W

Kenmore: Scottish Gaelic: A' Cheannmhor
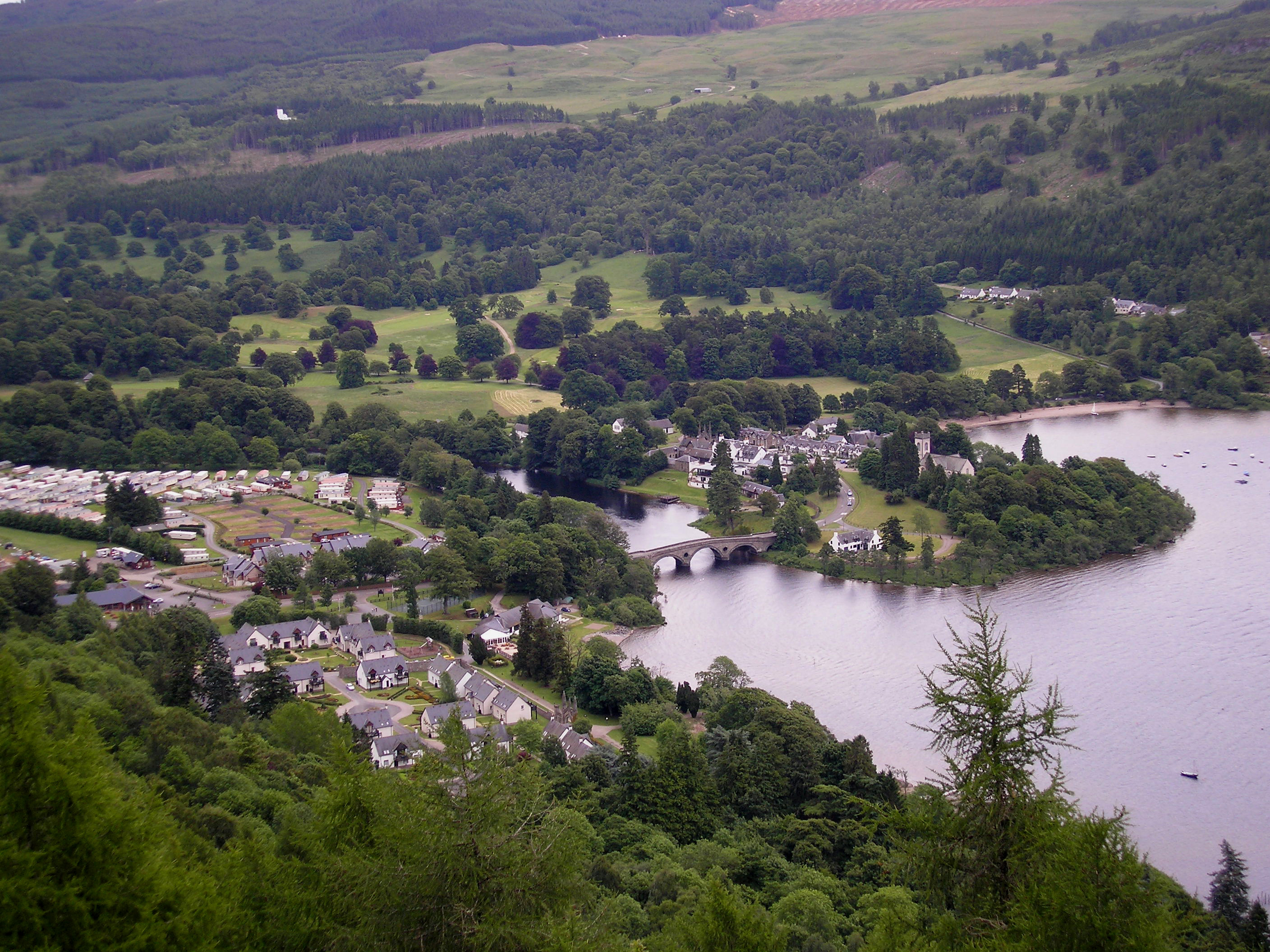
- Kenmore viewed from Black Rock

- Location within Perth and Kinross
- OS grid reference: NN773454
- Council area: Perth and Kinross
- Country: Scotland
- Sovereign state: United Kingdom
- Post town: Aberfeldy
- Postcode district: PH15
- Police: Scotland
- Fire: Scottish
- Ambulance: Scottish
- UK Parliament: Angus and Perthshire Glens
- Scottish Parliament: Perthshire North

Kenmore (Scottish Gaelic: A' Cheannmhor, IPA:[ˈaˈçaun̴̪auvɔɾ]) is a small village in Perthshire, in the Highlands of Scotland, located where Loch Tay drains into the River Tay.

== History ==
The village dates from the 16th century. It and the neighbouring Castle were originally known as Balloch (from Gaelic bealach, 'pass'). The original village was sited on the north side of river approximately two miles (three kilometres) from its present site and was known as Inchadney. In 1540 Sir Colin Campbell of Glenorchy started the construction of Balloch castle on the opposite bank of the river and the entire village was moved to a prominent headland by the shores of Loch Tay, hence the name Kenmore, which translates from Scots Gaelic to "big (or large) head". The village as it is seen today is a model village laid out by 3rd Earl of Breadalbane in 1760.

Kenmore Pier in Loch Tay was built for the Loch Tay Steamboat Company in 1882 by a workforce of 14 men to the designs of the engineer John Strain, C.E. of Glasgow. The transverse and longitudinal beams rested on piles 30 feet (9.1 m) long sunk 9 feet (2.7 m) into the bottom using hammers weighing 15 long hundredweight (760 kg). The weather side of the pier was planked so that the steamers could lie safely on the lee side. The pier was 210 feet (64 m) long and the depth of water at the end was 12 feet (3.7 m).

== Landmarks and tourism ==
The Kenmore Hotel, commissioned in 1572 by the then laird Colin Campbell, has its origins in a tavern built around 70 years earlier offering accommodation and refreshments. It is reputed to be Scotland's oldest hotel. Well known travel writer Rick Steves defined the community as "little more than the fancy domain of its castle, a church set in a bouquet of tombstones, and a line of humble houses, Kenmore offers a fine dose of small-town Scottish flavour".

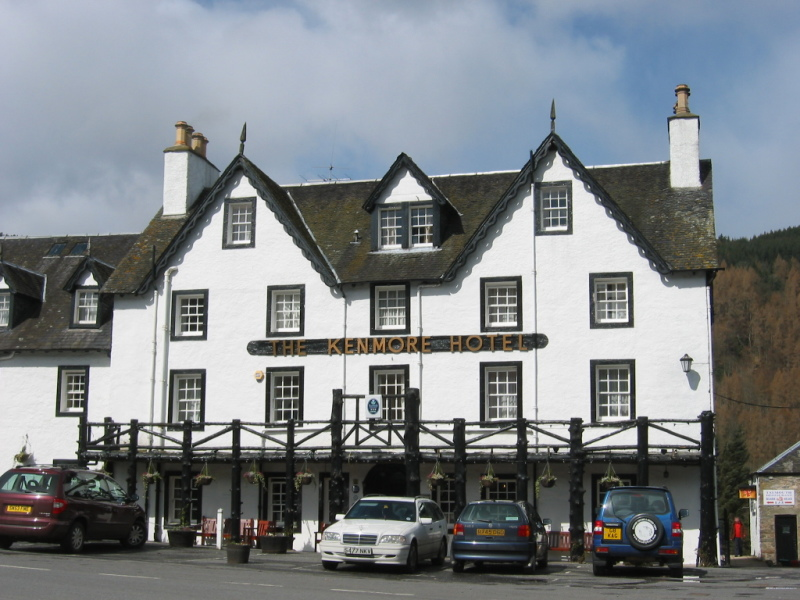
The Kenmore Hotel

Taymouth Castle, another Campbell creation, was built by John Campbell, 2nd Marquess of Breadalbane (d. 1862) on the site of its late medieval predecessor, Balloch Castle (built 1550 by the Campbells of Glenorchy, ancestors of the Marquesses of Breadalbane, demolished 1805). This enormous mansion, in neo-Gothic style, was completed in time for the visit of Queen Victoria in 1842. No expense was spared on the interior, which was decorated with the utmost sumptuousness. Taymouth Castle is now privately owned and has a golf course in its grounds.

Kenmore Bridge dates from 1774 and the village as it is today was laid out in the 18th century by the third Earl of Breadalbane. It retains many of its original buildings and historic appearance.

Around two miles (three kilometres) northeast of the village by the side of the A827 road is a complex multi-phase stone circle known as Croft Moraig Stone Circle.

To the southwest, between Kenmore and Acharn, the waterside settlement of Croft-na-Caber has been redeveloped into a number of tourist attractions. The Scottish Crannog Centre (formerly the Crannog Reconstruction Project) is an open-air museum on the south of Loch Tay Road. It features an accurate full-size reconstruction of a crannog, an Iron Age artificial island, of which more than 20 (most now submerged) have been found in Loch Tay. The crannog mockup is based on the real Oakbank Crannog archaeological site off the north shore of the loch. The Crannog mock-up was destroyed by fire on the evening of 11 June 2021. The visitor centre also displays artefacts from nearby excavations, which are funded in part by the proceeds from this attraction. The Croft-na-Caber Watersports & Activity Centre, originally planned as a £20 million sailing resort in 2009, now offers additional activities, including hydraboarding and canyoning. The original Croft-na-Caber Hotel closed in the 2000s, though the successor resort is served by other area hotels, the largest of which is the Kenmore Hotel.

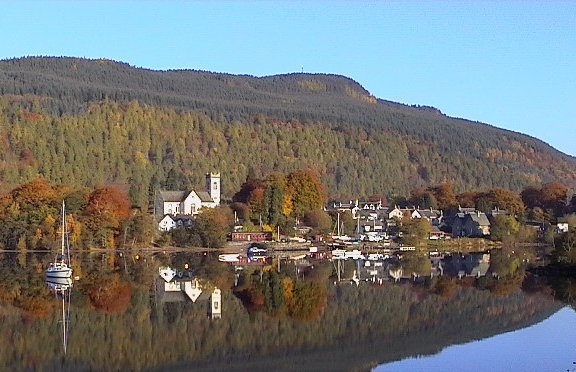
Kenmore viewed across Loch Tay

The biggest island in the loch, known as the Isle of Loch Tay, or in Gaelic Eilean nam Ban-naomh, 'Isle of Holy Women', is just north of Kenmore. It was the site of a nunnery in the 12th century and was the burial place of Queen Sibylla (d. 1122), wife of Alexander I of Scotland (1107–24). A castle was built on the island in the later Middle Ages. Signs of 18 crannogs, "circular houses on stilts", have been found Loch Tay. Only one was rebuilt and became the museum known as the Scottish Crannog Centre.

== Climate ==
As with the rest of the British Isles and Scotland, Kenmore experiences a maritime climate with cool summers and mild winters. The nearest official Metoffice weather station for which online records are available is Ardtalnaig, about 6 miles (10 kilometres) southwest of the settlement. Despite its location in the interior of Scotland, the vast Loch Tay adjacent to the village provides some insulation from extreme frost – unlike many weather observing sites in this area of Scotland, no month averages a minimum below freezing point, and no temperatures below −16.0 °C (3.2 °F) have been reported since at least 1960.

Climate data for Ardtalnaig, 130 m (430 ft) asl, 1991-2020, extremes 1960- (Weather station 6 miles (10 km) SW of Kenmore)
Month	Jan	Feb	Mar	Apr	May	Jun	Jul	Aug	Sep	Oct	Nov	Dec	Year
Record high °C (°F)	14.0 (57.2)	14.8 (58.6)	17.8 (64.0)	25.0 (77.0)	26.5 (79.7)	31.4 (88.5)	30.1 (86.2)	29.3 (84.7)	26.2 (79.2)	22.5 (72.5)	16.1 (61.0)	13.9 (57.0)	31.4 (88.5)
Mean daily maximum °C (°F)	6.2 (43.2)	6.8 (44.2)	9.0 (48.2)	12.0 (53.6)	15.4 (59.7)	17.6 (63.7)	19.2 (66.6)	18.6 (65.5)	16.1 (61.0)	12.1 (53.8)	8.7 (47.7)	6.5 (43.7)	12.4 (54.2)
Mean daily minimum °C (°F)	1.0 (33.8)	1.1 (34.0)	2.0 (35.6)	3.6 (38.5)	5.8 (42.4)	8.7 (47.7)	10.6 (51.1)	10.4 (50.7)	8.6 (47.5)	5.8 (42.4)	3.2 (37.8)	1.0 (33.8)	5.1 (41.3)
Record low °C (°F)	−15.9 (3.4)	−9.8 (14.4)	−12.2 (10.0)	−5.6 (21.9)	−2 (28)	0.6 (33.1)	3.3 (37.9)	1.7 (35.1)	−0.3 (31.5)	−4.0 (24.8)	−7.9 (17.8)	−13.4 (7.9)	−15.9 (3.4)
Average precipitation mm (inches)	197.0 (7.76)	136.2 (5.36)	116.2 (4.57)	83.3 (3.28)	79.4 (3.13)	77.7 (3.06)	78.3 (3.08)	88.4 (3.48)	101.0 (3.98)	146.8 (5.78)	157.9 (6.22)	177.3 (6.98)	1,439.5 (56.68)
Average rainy days	17.9	14.9	14.7	12.1	12.3	12.7	13.0	13.3	13.5	16.7	17.4	17.2	175.7
Mean monthly sunshine hours	21.4	50.9	88.4	131.7	173.3	162.9	161.8	141.7	103.8	67.9	33.3	10.9	1,147.8
Source 1: Meteoclimat
Source 2: Royal Netherlands Meteorological Institute
