= Killin Railway =

Former railway line in Scotland

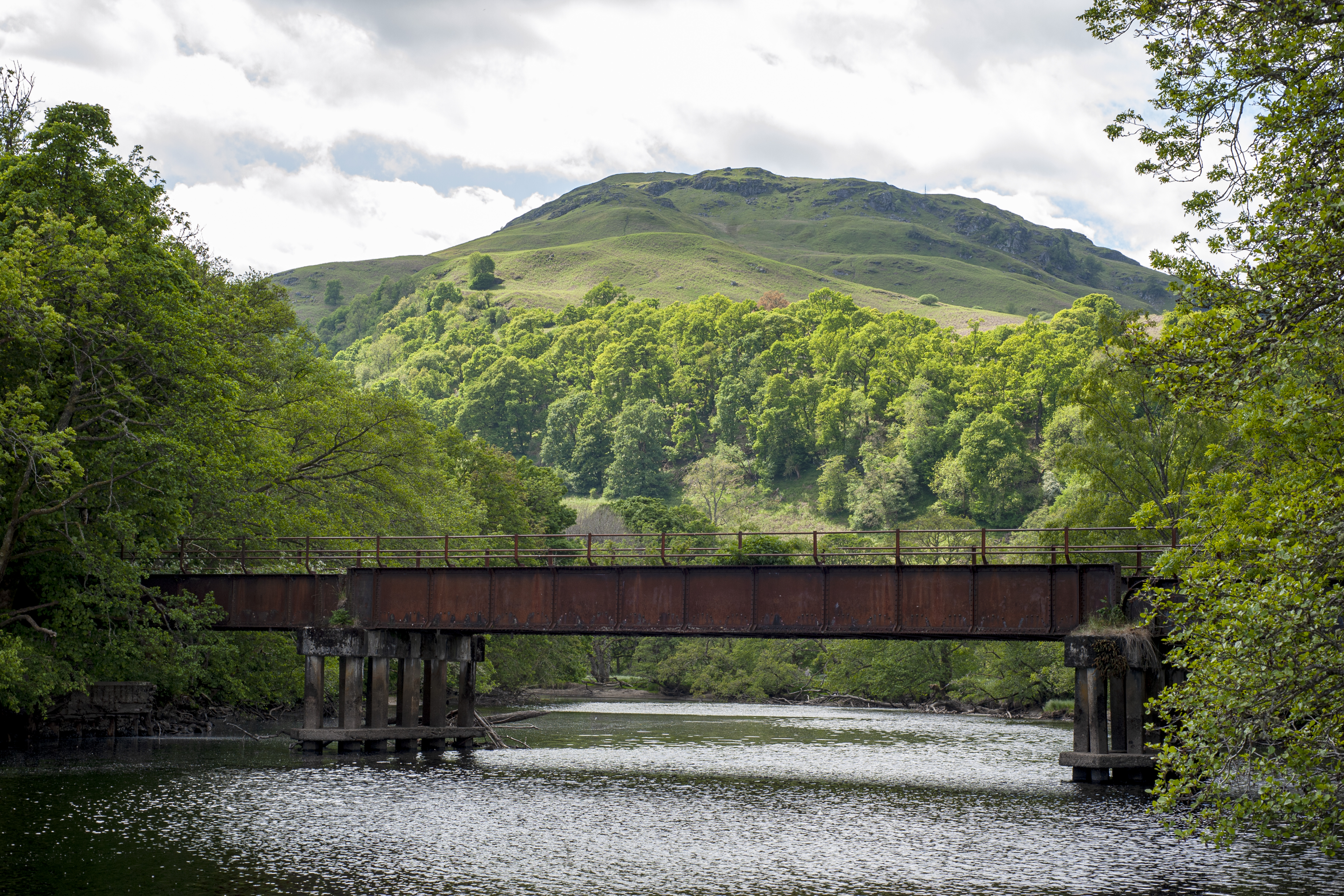
- Former railway bridge over the River Lochay at Killin

Overview
- Locale: Scotland
- Dates of operation: 1886–31 December 1922
- Successor: London, Midland and Scottish Railway

Technical
- Track gauge: 4 ft 8 1/2 in (1,435 mm)

The Killin Railway was a locally promoted railway line built to connect the town of Killin to the Callander and Oban Railway main line nearby. It opened in 1886, and carried tourist traffic for steamers on Loch Tay as well as local business. The directors and the majority of the shareholders were local people, and the little company retained its independence until 1923.

When the adjacent main line closed in 1965, the Killin line closed too.

== History ==
=== Planning and local funding ===
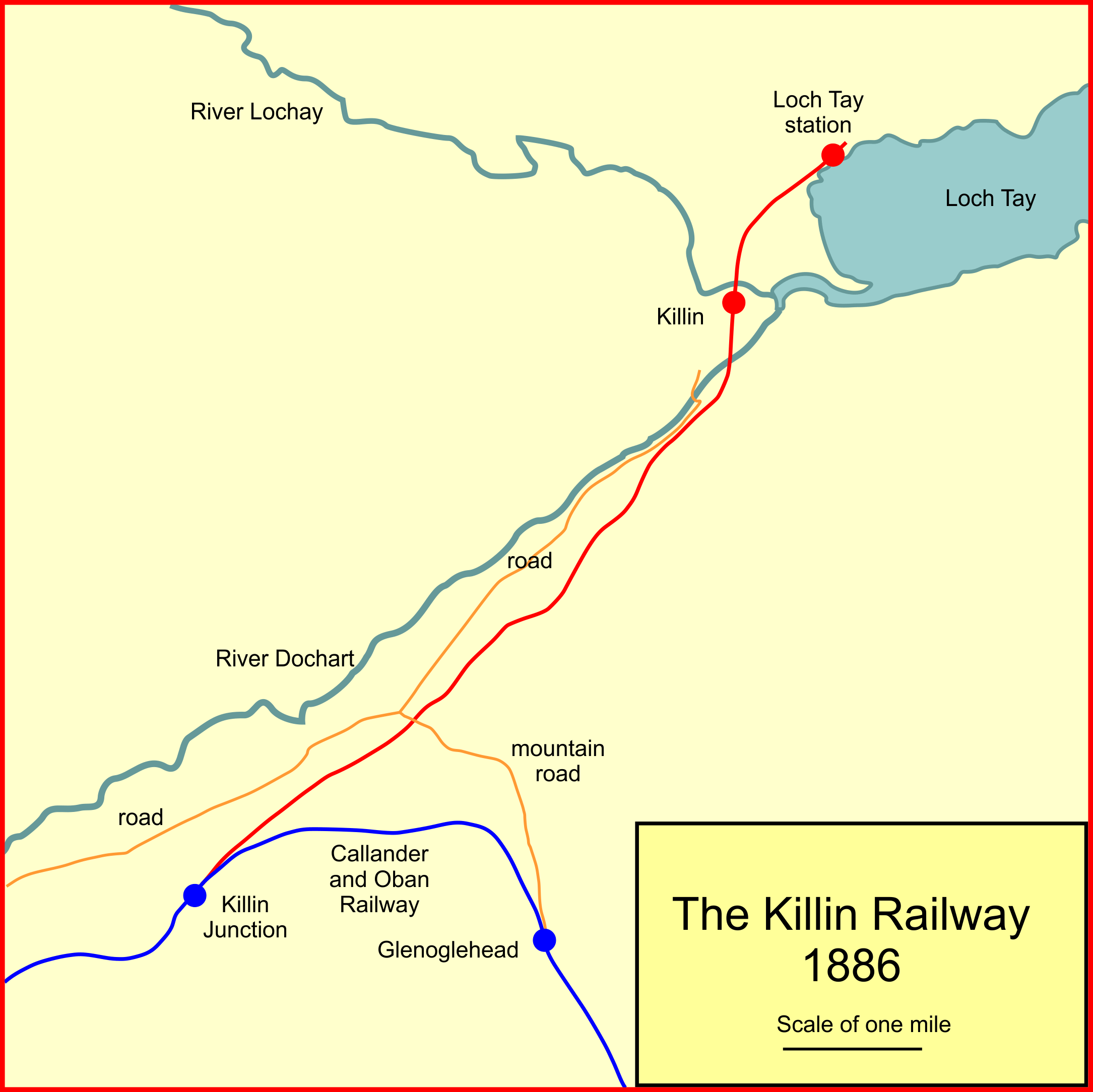
System map of the Killin Railway

On 1 June 1870, the Callander and Oban Railway opened the first portion of its line. Shortage of cash meant that the original intention of linking Oban to the railway network was to be deferred for now. The line opened from the former Dunblane, Doune and Callander Railway at Callander to a station named Killin, but it was at Glenoglehead, high above the town and three miles (5 km) distant down a steep and rugged track.

The difficult local terrain prevented any question of the line to Oban passing through Killin, and local people were for the time being happy enough that they had a railway connection of a sort; indeed tourist trade was brought in to the town. The Callander and Oban Railway had in fact been absorbed by the Caledonian Railway but continued to be managed semi-autonomously. The Caledonian was a far larger concern that had money problems, and priorities, elsewhere. Nevertheless, as time went on, extension of the first line to Oban was resumed in stages, and finally completed on 30 June 1880.

The people of Killin petitioned the Callander and Oban company for a branch line, but this was refused, and when the Caledonian Railway itself was persuaded to obtain parliamentary authority to build the branch, the bill failed in Parliament.

In frustration, local people decided to build the railway themselves. Gavin Campbell, 1st Marquess of Breadalbane was anxious to develop the area, and under his chairmanship the first meeting of the local railway took place on 19 August 1882, in Killin. Making a branch to join the Callander and Oban at its "Killin" station would involve an impossibly steep gradient, but a line was planned to meet the C&OR further west and at a lower altitude. Even so, the branch would be four miles (6.4 km) long with a gradient of 1 in 50. It could be built for about £18,000. At the Killin end, the line would be extended to a pier on Loch Tay, serving the steamer excursion traffic on the loch.

=== Construction ===
Share subscriptions locally were slow to be taken up at first, but with the help of Breadalbane and others, the money was raised, mostly from small traders locally. As no-one was objecting to the line, a parliamentary hearing for incorporation was unnecessary, only a Board of Trade certificate being required; this was permitted under the Railways Construction Facilities Act 1864. The certificate was received on 8 August 1883, and tenders for the construction had already been invited, and received. Authorised capital was £20,785.

One of the tenders, at £13,783, was £3,000 cheaper than the next lowest. The directors had misgivings about the competence of this contractor, MacDonald of Skye, but they accepted the tender.

There were some considerable bridges in the line, to be built as mass-concrete arch structures. MacDonald needed materials for them; his lack of credit at the bank made difficulties for him in obtaining bulk materials, and progress was very slow. By November 1884 MacDonald was in serious difficulties, unable to pay his men and unable to obtain even feed for the horses on the work. The contract was terminated, and re-allocated to John Best of Glasgow. Much time had been lost and the 1885 summer season was now lost.

As the time for actual opening approached, the designation of the stations needed to be decided. A suggestion was Killin Junction, Killin, and Killin Pier. (The Callander and Oban already had a "Killin" on its line). It was then thought that the Loch ought to be referred to, and the pier station was called Loch Tay. (Note: Thomas consistently uses the spelling Lochtay, as does Ross. Quick states that the station was opened as Loch Tay Killin Pier, being renamed Loch Tay in 1895. The 1895 Bradshaw's timetable uses Loch Tay.)

On 8 September 1885 Major Marindin, the Board of Trade inspector, was due to assess the line for passenger operation. However a severe snowstorm dislocated the trains and he was unable to be there. The cloud had a silver lining, for the Callander had a considerable amount of coal to deliver in the Killin area, by road cartage, which could not operate. The Killin Railway could at least get the coal to Killin, and could bring farmers' produce out. The contractor's engine was used. Marindin's re-arranged inspection was successful, and the line had an opening ceremony on 13 March 1886. It opened for public passenger operation on 1 April 1886. The Callander and Oban station named Killin was renamed Glenoglehead. (Note: Quick says Glenoglehead Crossing.)

=== Services ===
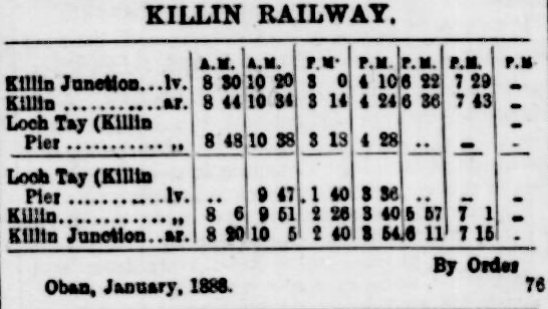
Timetable of the Killin Railway from the Oban Times and Argyllshire Advertiser Saturday 12 January 1889

Killin Junction had three platform faces, with the Killin Railway on the northern face of an island platform. It was an exchange station only: passengers could not leave the station except by train. The Caledonian Railway worked the line for 55% of gross receipts. The line worked on the one engine in steam principle. There were eight trains each way daily between Killin Junction and Killin, half of them running to Loch Tay station.

Killin station had a single platform and no run-round loop; terminating trains propelled their train on to the gradient, and the engine moved to the goods yard. The coaches then ran back to the platform under the force of gravity, controlled by the guard using the brake, and the engine was coupled at the junction end. The Westinghouse brake was used in normal train operation.

Loch Tay station had a single platform also, but there was a small engine shed there and goods facilities. Loch Tay was intended solely for connections to steamers.

In 1921 the Caledonian Railway acquired the Loch Tay Steamboat Company which owned two steamers on the loch; the company was loss-making, and the Caledonian wished to continue the tourist trade over the Callander and Oban line; the Killin Railway obviously benefitted also.

On 19 October 1922 the Marquis of Breadalbane died. As the local dignitary he had taken a benevolent interest in the success of the Killin Railway, often funding its shortages of money. It had never paid a dividend in twenty years. Breadalbane's trustees were not well disposed to continue the benevolence.

=== Grouping ===
The Railways Act 1921 compulsorily organised nearly all the railways of Great Britain into four large groups: the process was called "the grouping" and it was supposed to take effect on 1 January 1923. The C&OR and the Killin Railway were to be "schemed" into the new London Midland and Scottish Railway. In fact the technicalities of finalising the accounts of numerous small concerns caused the detail of the process to overrun. Since Breadalbane's demise there were only two directors of the Killin Railway, both local men unacquainted with national railway politics and they were taken by surprise when the new LMS indicated the terms of the takeover. Fearing no evil, they rejected the terms, which were to pay £1 for every £100 Killin Railway. In addition they would shoulder all the company's considerable debts. Persistence paid off, and the LMS gradually raised its offer, eventually reaching £8, which the Killin Railway accepted. The Killin Railway was now a small branch line on the LMS railway.

The Loch Tay steamers were discontinued in 1939 and the passenger trains stopped running to Loch Tay station; however the goods siding and the engine shed were there, and they continued to be used. In the 1950s a hydro-electric power generating station was built on the Loch, and the railway and its pier were used for bringing in materials for the construction.

=== Closure ===
With the decline in the usage of local railways after World War II, the goods service on the branch was discontinued on 7 November 1964.

The C&OR line was to be closed completely on 1 November 1965, and the Killin branch with it. In fact there was a serious rockfall on the C&OR line in Glen Ogle on 27 September 1965, and the line was impassable; clearing the line was unaffordable, and the line never re-opened. The Killin branch closed prematurely on the next day.

== Topography ==
The stations were:

- Killin Junction; on main Callander and Oban line, facing for trains from Oban;
- Killin;
- Loch Tay; probably known as Loch Tay Killin Pier at first, until 1895.

The section between Killin and Loch Tay was closed to passengers on 9 September 1939, and the entire line closed on 28 September 1965.

The short line fell at a continuous gradient of 1 in 50 from Killin Junction to Killin; from there to Loch Tay the line was broadly level.

== Current uses ==
Killin station buildings were demolished shortly after closure, and the site is now occupied by a car park and council premises. Loch Tay station building is now a private house.

The trackbed now forms part of the Rob Roy Way, a cycle path/walk that connects Drymen with Pitlochry. The path incorporates much of the trackbed of the old Callander and Oban Railway.
