= Glen Ogle =

Glen in Scotland

Coordinates: 56°24′30″N 4°18′45″W

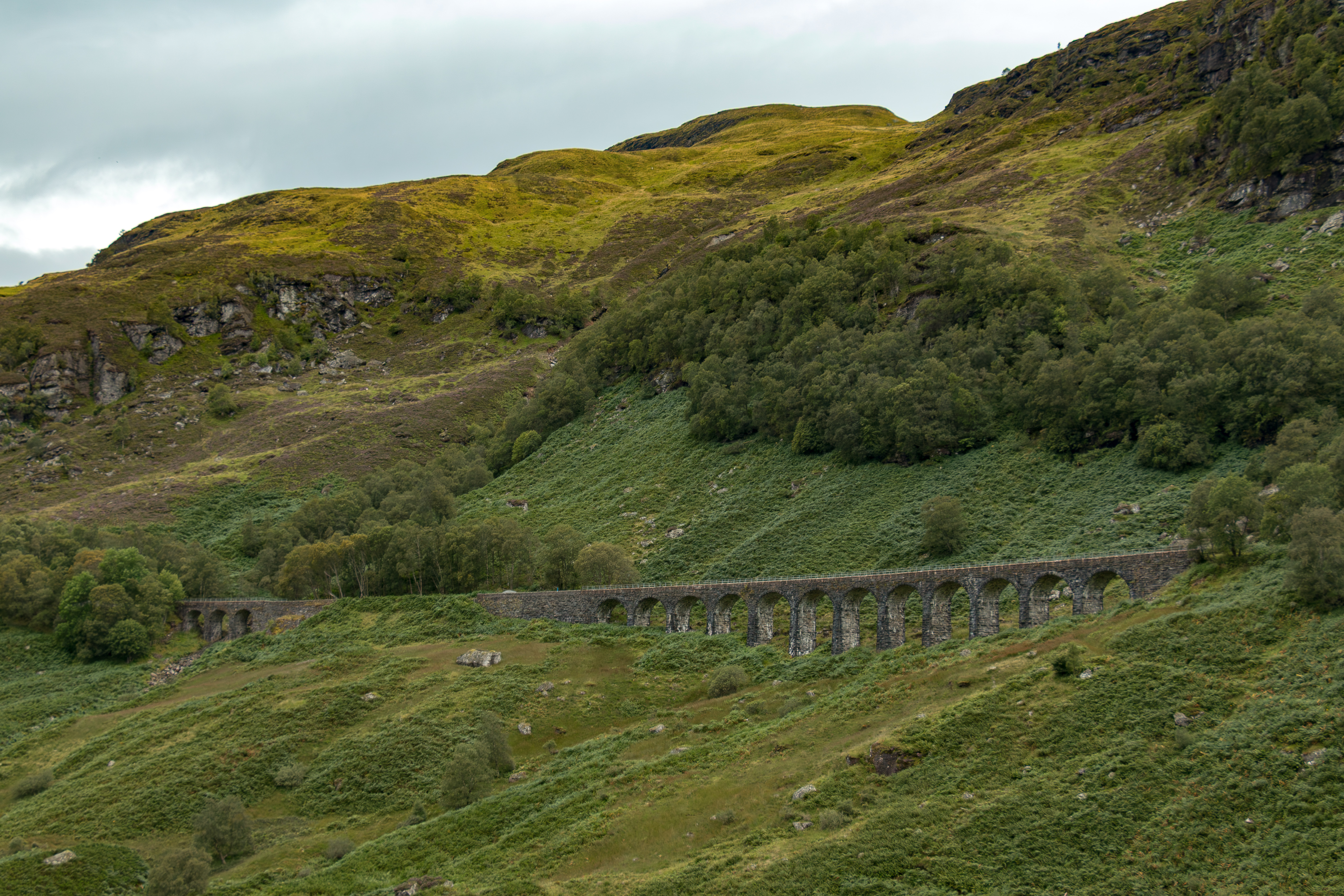
Glen Ogle viaduct seen from the A85

Glen Ogle (Scottish Gaelic: Gleann Ogail) extends 7 miles north westwards from Lochearnhead to Lix Toll, where it opens into Glen Dochart.

The Ogle Burn flows within the steep sides of the glen, from the Lochan Lairig Cheile at the glen's head.

The military road, which can be seen from the modern road, was built in 1749 by Major William Caulfeild. It was used by the British Army in its efforts to pacify the Highlands after the Jacobite rising of 1745.

== Climate ==
Glen Ogle has a subpolar oceanic climate (Köppen climate classification: Cfc), colder compared to most of the United Kingdom, which mostly features an oceanic climate (Köppen climate classification: Cfb).

Climate data for Glen Ogle, Elevation: 564 m (1,850 ft), 1991–2020
Month	Jan	Feb	Mar	Apr	May	Jun	Jul	Aug	Sep	Oct	Nov	Dec	Year
Mean daily maximum °C (°F)	3.1 (37.6)	3.0 (37.4)	4.4 (39.9)	7.1 (44.8)	10.5 (50.9)	13.9 (57.0)	15.0 (59.0)	14.3 (57.7)	11.8 (53.2)	8.2 (46.8)	5.3 (41.5)	3.5 (38.3)	8.4 (47.1)
Daily mean °C (°F)	1.0 (33.8)	0.9 (33.6)	2.0 (35.6)	4.2 (39.6)	7.2 (45.0)	10.2 (50.4)	11.8 (53.2)	11.4 (52.5)	9.3 (48.7)	6.1 (43.0)	3.3 (37.9)	1.5 (34.7)	5.7 (42.3)
Mean daily minimum °C (°F)	−1.0 (30.2)	−1.2 (29.8)	−0.4 (31.3)	1.4 (34.5)	3.8 (38.8)	6.5 (43.7)	8.5 (47.3)	8.4 (47.1)	6.8 (44.2)	4.0 (39.2)	1.3 (34.3)	−0.5 (31.1)	3.2 (37.8)
Source: Met Office

Climate data for Glen Ogle, elevation: 564m (1981–2010)
Month	Jan	Feb	Mar	Apr	May	Jun	Jul	Aug	Sep	Oct	Nov	Dec	Year
Mean daily maximum °C (°F)	2.9 (37.2)	2.7 (36.9)	4.2 (39.6)	6.8 (44.2)	10.2 (50.4)	12.4 (54.3)	14.3 (57.7)	14.0 (57.2)	11.5 (52.7)	7.9 (46.2)	5.1 (41.2)	3.3 (37.9)	8.0 (46.4)
Daily mean °C (°F)	0.9 (33.6)	0.6 (33.1)	1.8 (35.2)	3.8 (38.8)	6.9 (44.4)	9.3 (48.7)	11.4 (52.5)	11.2 (52.2)	9.0 (48.2)	5.8 (42.4)	3.1 (37.6)	1.3 (34.3)	5.5 (41.9)
Mean daily minimum °C (°F)	−1.1 (30.0)	−1.5 (29.3)	−0.7 (30.7)	0.8 (33.4)	3.5 (38.3)	6.1 (43.0)	8.4 (47.1)	8.3 (46.9)	6.5 (43.7)	3.7 (38.7)	1.1 (34.0)	−0.7 (30.7)	2.9 (37.2)
Source: Met Office

== Railway walk ==
It is possible to walk through the glen on a footpath that follows the course of the former Callander and Oban Railway to the summit of the glen and Killin Junction. The route uses the Category B listed 150-yard (140 m) long Glen Ogle viaduct, built between 1866 and 1870. The original design was for 20 arches, but the bridge was built with 12 stone arches.

== History ==
=== 1994 Tornado crash ===
At Killin, two RAF pilots were on killed on Thursday 1 September 1994, at 12.04pm in Tornado ZG708 of 13 Squadron at RAF Marham. It was a possible bird strike. The A84 was closed.

- Flt Lt Peter John Michael Mosley, 31, the pilot
- Flt Lt Patrick Peter Harrison, 33
