= Alexander Peden =

Scottish covenanter and prophet (1626–1686)

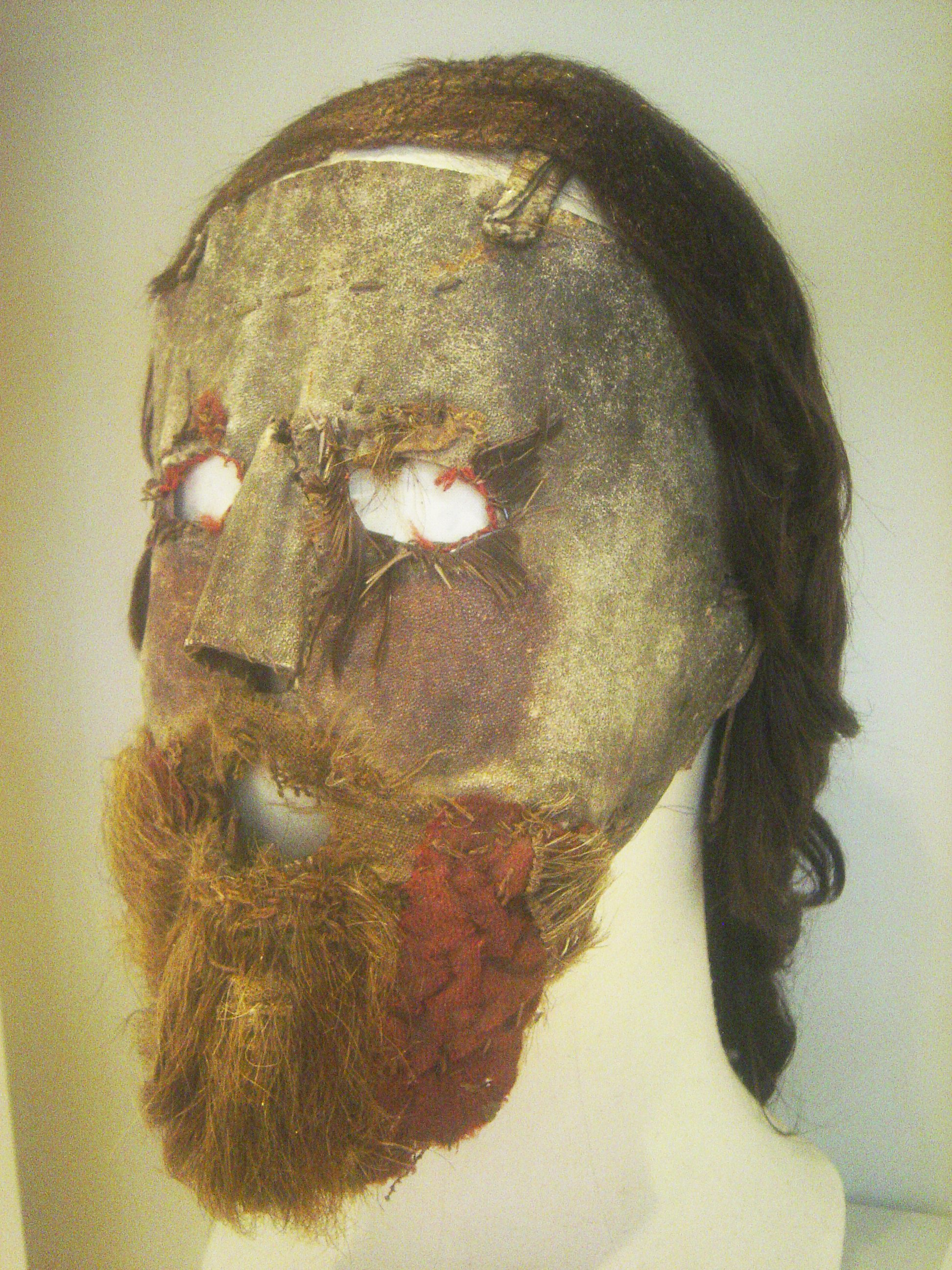
- Peden's cloth mask and wig displayed in the Museum of Scotland

Personal life
- Born: 1626 Sorn, Ayrshire, Scotland
- Died: January 26, 1686 (aged 59–60) Sorn, Ayrshire, Scotland
- Resting place: Cumnock, Scotland; 55.455364°N 4.262325°W
- Education: University of Glasgow

Religious life
- Religion: Christianity
- School: Presbyterianism

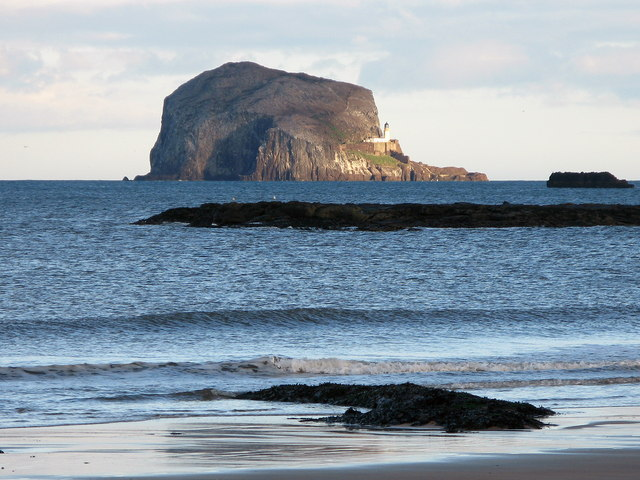
The Bass Rock, East Lothian. Peden endured upwards of five years from 26 June 1673 to 9 October 1678 closely shut up in that "desolate sea-girt Rock".

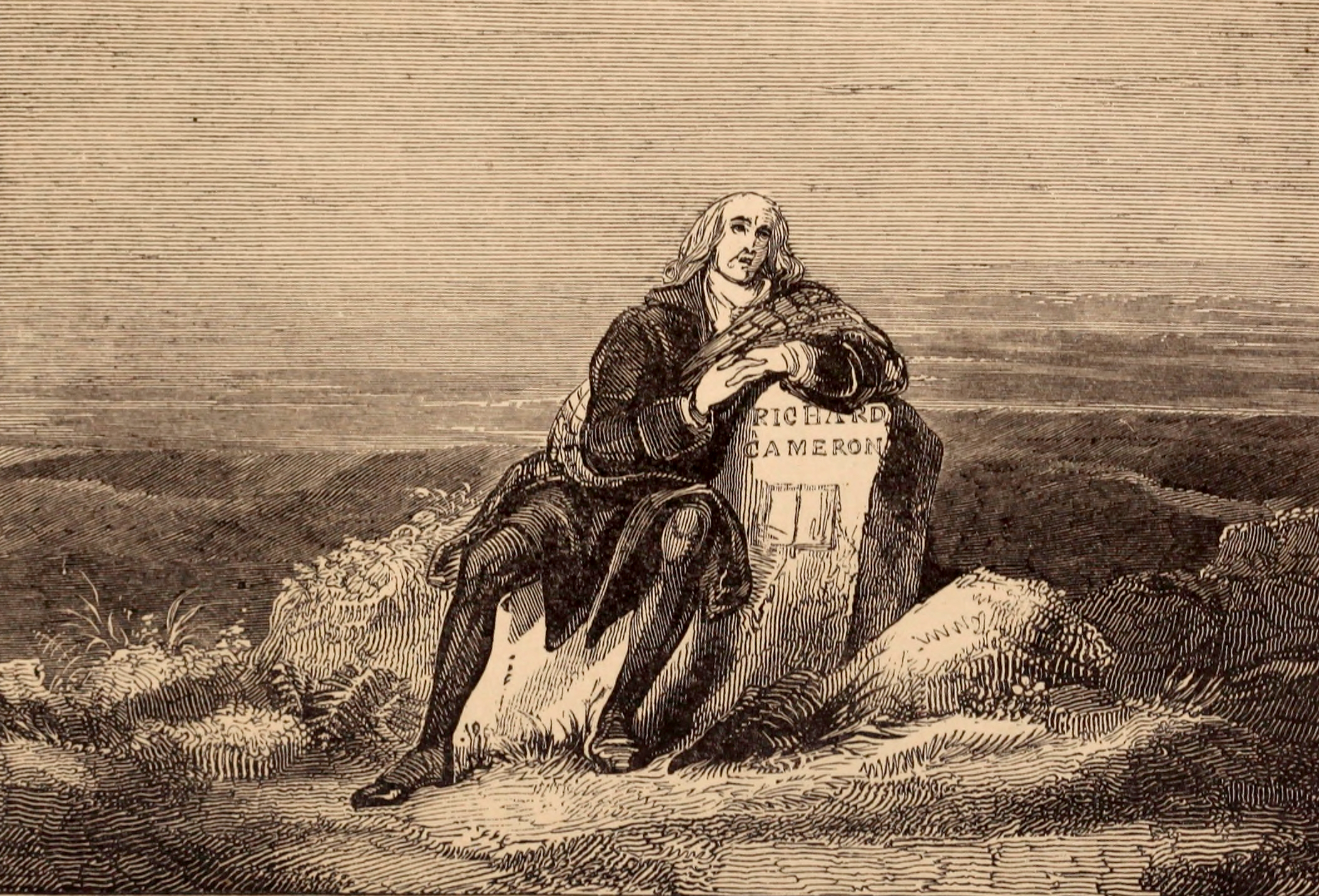
Peden at Richard Cameron's grave. Peden is reported to have said "Oh to be wi thee, Ritchie!" at the grave of Cameron's decapitated body.

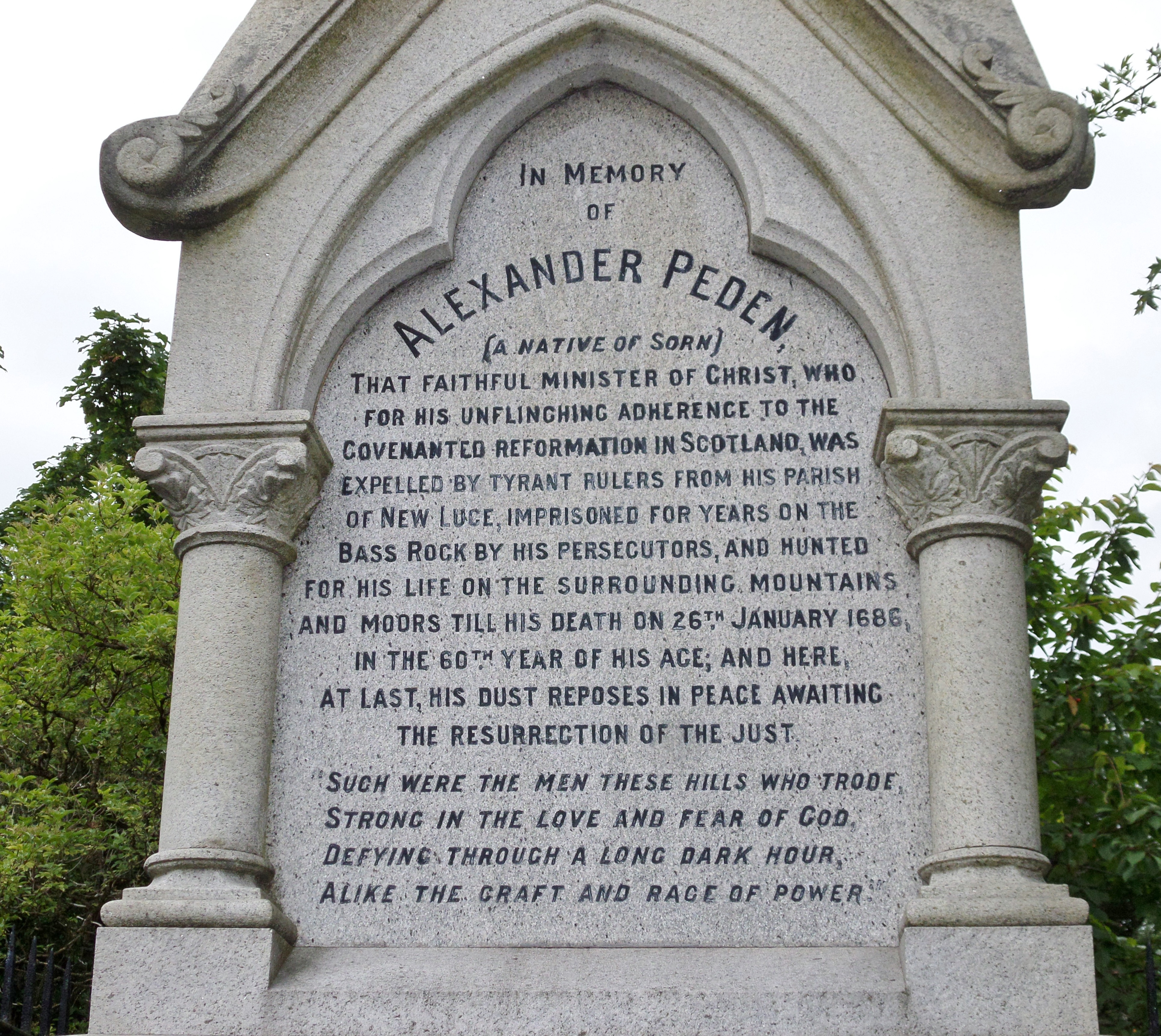
Alexander Peden Memorial inscription, Cumnock, East Ayrshire, Scotland

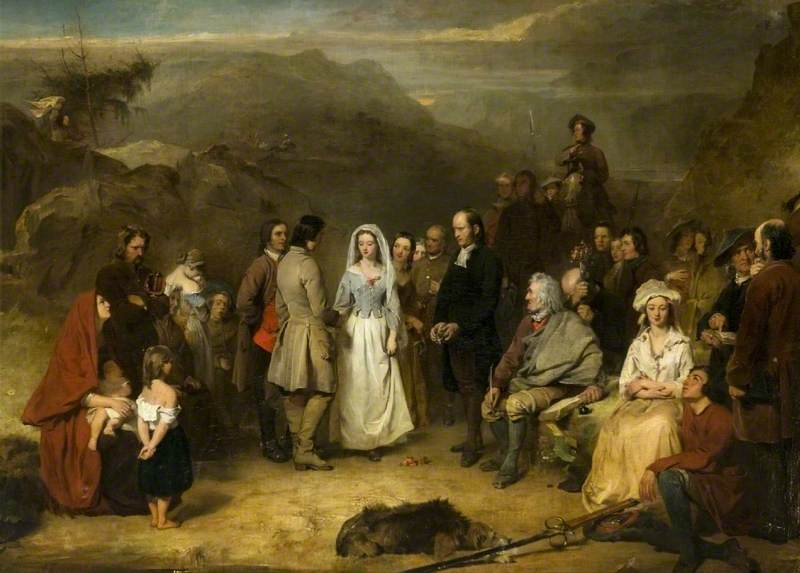
The Marriage of the Covenanter, by Alexander Johnston (1815–1891). Alexander Peden conducted the marriage of John Brown to Isabel Weir at Priesthill in Muirkirk parish in 1682

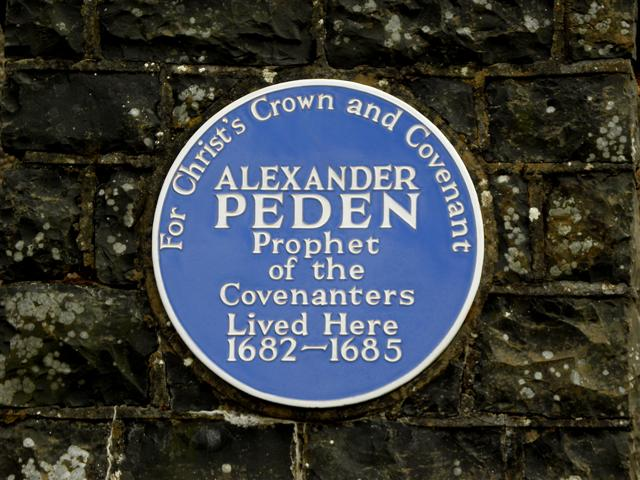
Peden's blue plaque at Mistyburn, Antrim, Northern Ireland

Alexander Peden (1626 – 26 January 1686), also known as "Prophet Peden", was one of the leading figures in the Covenanter movement in Scotland.

== Life ==
Peden was born at Auchincloich Farm near Sorn, Ayrshire, about 1626. He was the son of a small proprietor. His name can also be spelled Peathine or Pethein. He was possibly the Alexander Peden who was the restored heir of his grandfather in Hillhead of Sorn, 16 March 1648, and on the same day heir of Auchinlonfuird.

Of his early training, there is no clear record, but he may have attended the parish school of Mauchline, and he was a student at the University of Glasgow from 1643 to 1648. For a time he acted as schoolmaster, precentor, and session-clerk at Tarbolton, Ayrshire, and, according to Robert Wodrow, was employed in a similar capacity at Fenwick.

In 1660 he was ordained minister of New Luce in Wigtownshire. As he was about to receive license from the Presbytery of Ayr, an accusation of immorality was raised against him, but was found to be false. In 1659 he was ordained to this charge, and was deprived by Act of Parliament 11 June, and Decreet of Privy Council 1 October 1662. When he preached his farewell sermon, he is said to have occupied the pulpit till nightfall, and on leaving it, to have knocked three times on the pulpit door with his Bible, saying, "I arrest thee in my Master's name, that none enter thee but such as come by the door, as I have done."

Following his ejection, Peden became perhaps the most celebrated field preacher of his time. He wandered all over the south of Scotland, obtaining by his figurative and oracular style of address and his supposed prophetic gifts an extraordinary influence over the people, which was further increased by his hardships, perils, and numerous hairbreadth escapes.

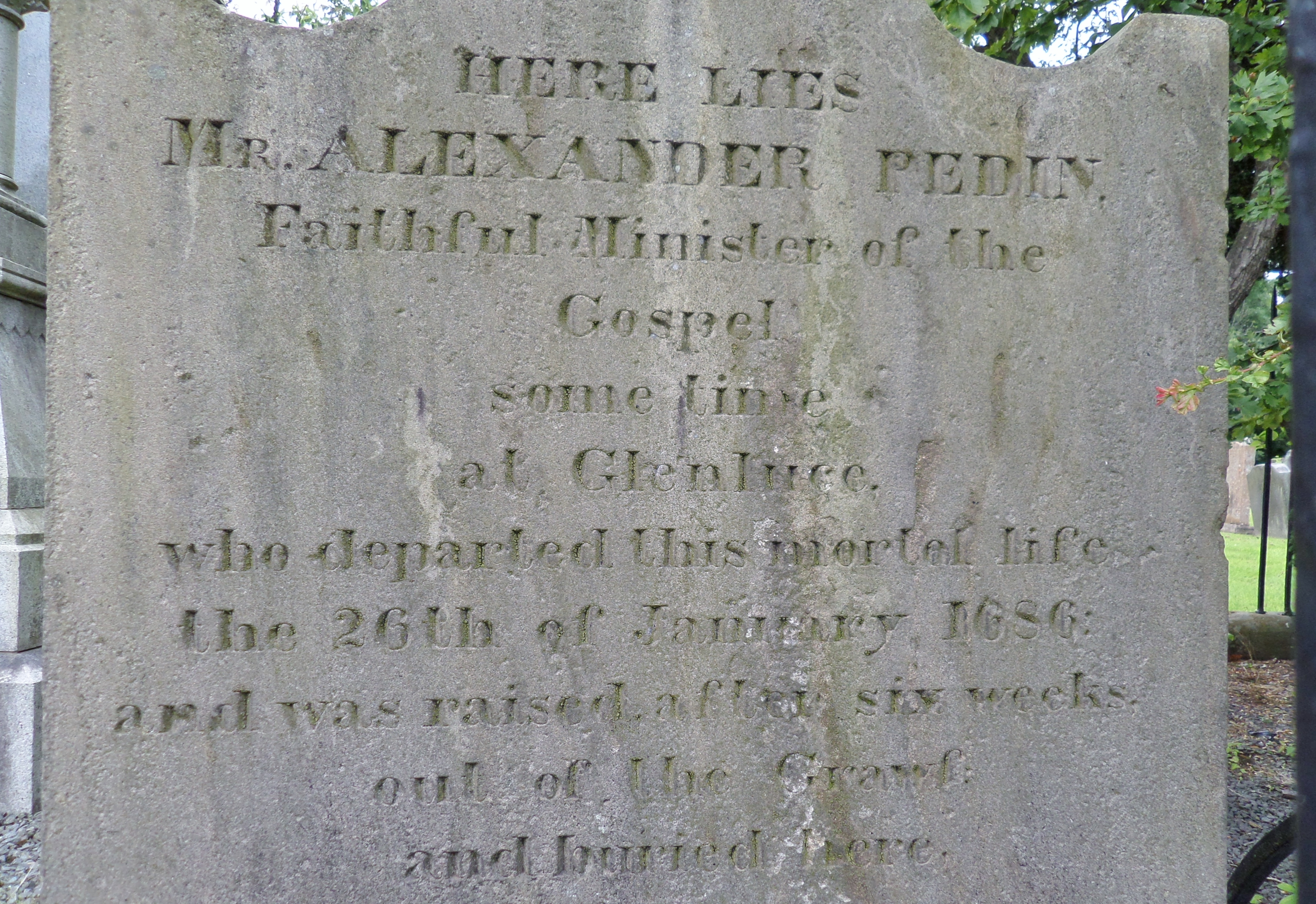
Alexander Peden's gravestone, Cumnock, East Ayrshire, Scotland

After the Restoration of Charles II, Peden had to leave his parish under Middleton's Ejectment Act in 1663. For ten years he wandered far and wide, bringing comfort and succour to his co-religionists, and often very narrowly escaping capture, spending some of his time in Ireland. To hide his identity, Peden took to wearing a cloth mask and wig, which are now on display in Edinburgh's Museum of Scotland. On 25 January 1666, he was denounced as a rebel, and was excepted from the pardon after the Pentland Rising. On 16 August 1667, he was declared a fugitive. He fled to Ireland in 1670, but returned in 1673.

In June 1673, while holding a conventicle at Knockdow near Ballantrae, Ayrshire, he was captured by Major William Cockburn and condemned by the Privy Council to four years and three months' imprisonment on the Bass Rock and a further fifteen months in the Edinburgh Tolbooth. He was confined on the rock from 26 June 1673 to 9 October 1677, when he was removed to the Edinburgh Tolbooth, where he remained until December 1678. A petition for liberation was refused, and he was sentenced instead to perpetual banishment. In December 1678, he and 60 others were sentenced to banishment to the American plantations. They were transported by ship to London, where they were to be transferred to an American ship. The American captain of the ship which was chartered to convey Peden and his companions to the Virginia plantations, however, on discovering they were being banished for their religious opinions, not as convicts, declined to take them aboard, and they were set at liberty. From London, Peden found his way back to Scotland, and again to the north of Ireland.

In 1682, Peden performed the wedding ceremony of John Brown and his second wife, Isabel Weir. He told Isabel after the ceremony, "You have a good man to be your husband, but you will not enjoy him long; prize his company, and keep linen by you to be his winding sheet, for you will need it when ye are not looking for it, and it will be a bloody one". On the night of 30 April or morning of 1 May 1685, troops commanded by Captain John Graham of Claverhouse shot John Brown for his refusal to take the 1684 Oath of Abjuration or to swear not to rise in arms against the king. This oath did not require one to proclaim the king as the head of the church. However, it would have been understood by a Covenanter to be a promise not to resist the king's claimed supremacy, ecclesiastical as well as civil. Peden was 11 miles away. He prayed with the family of John Muirhead in his home, "Lord, when wilt Thou avenge Brown's blood? O, let Brown's blood be precious in Thy sight." Peden told them of his vision of Brown's wife weeping over his corpse and of Claverhouse killing John Brown.

== Death ==
Peden's privations and anxieties had gradually undermined his health. Resolving to spend his last days in his native district, he found shelter in a cave on the River Lugar in the parish of Sorn, near his brother's farm just north of Ochiltree, part of Auchinleck Estate. Having a presentiment that he had not many hours to live, he left the cave one evening and went to his brother's farm, where he died on 28 January 1686. He was buried in the Boswell aisle of Auchinleck Church.

Forty days after, a troop of dragoons from Sorn Castle took his corpse two miles to Cumnock gallows, and were about to hang it up in chains. However, William Crichton, 2nd Earl of Dumfries, objected, so they buried it at the foot of the gallows. In 1891 a monument was erected to mark the spot. After the 1688 Glorious Revolution, the inhabitants of the parish of Cumnock, in token of their esteem for Peden, abandoned their ancient burial-place, and formed a new one round the gallows hill.

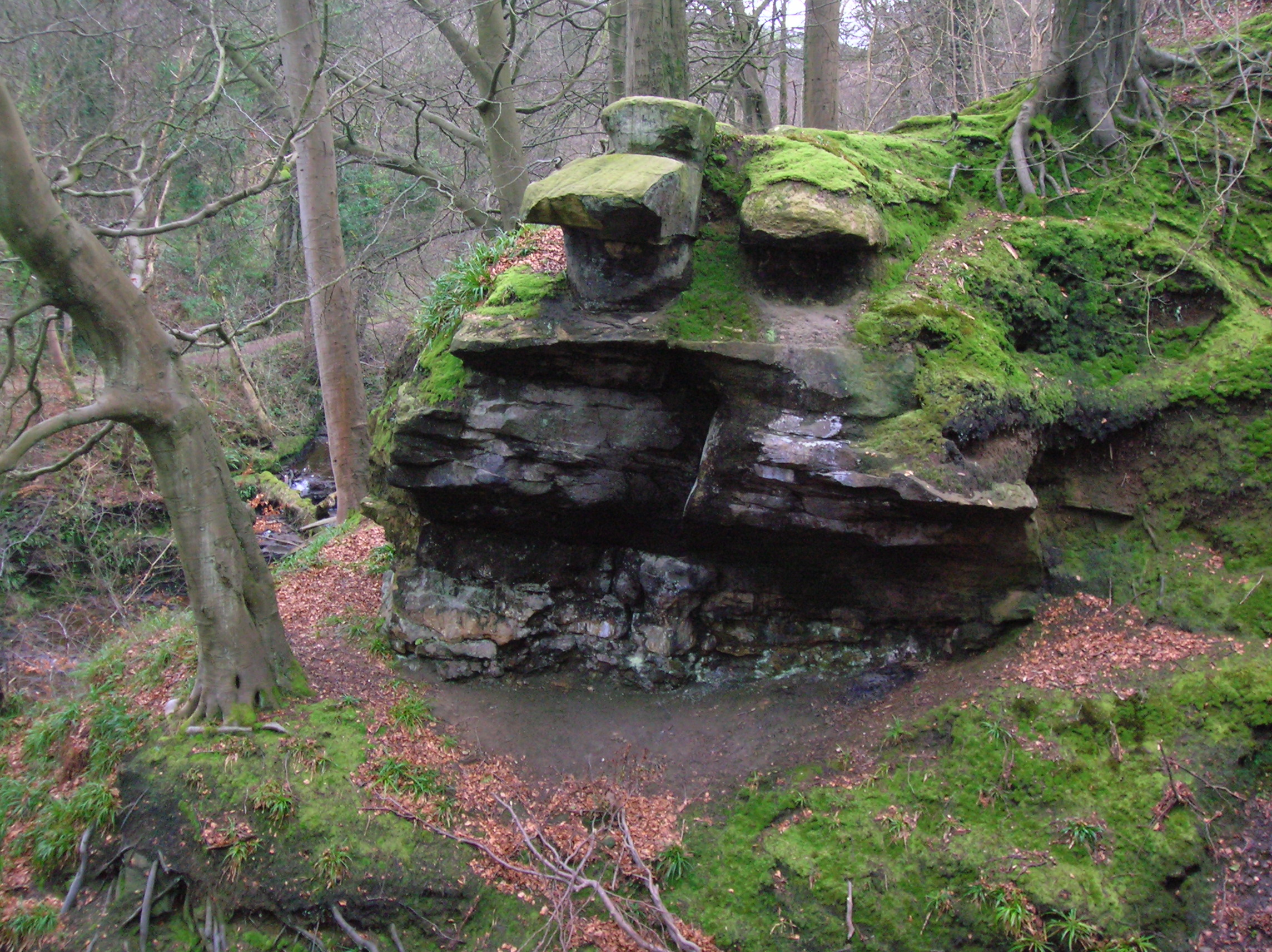
Peden's pulpit in the Linn Glen, Dalry. The outcrop overlooks a natural amphitheatre.

He was the most eminent and revered of all the Scottish covenanting preachers, and his influence upon the mass of the people was so great that they gave him the name of "The Prophet," and were accustomed to regard him as almost possessed of the prophetic afflatus. Peden receives attention in Jack Deere's 1993 book Surprised by the Voice of God, which records prophetic and other charismatic gifts practised by historical reformed figures.

== Alexander Peden Stone ==
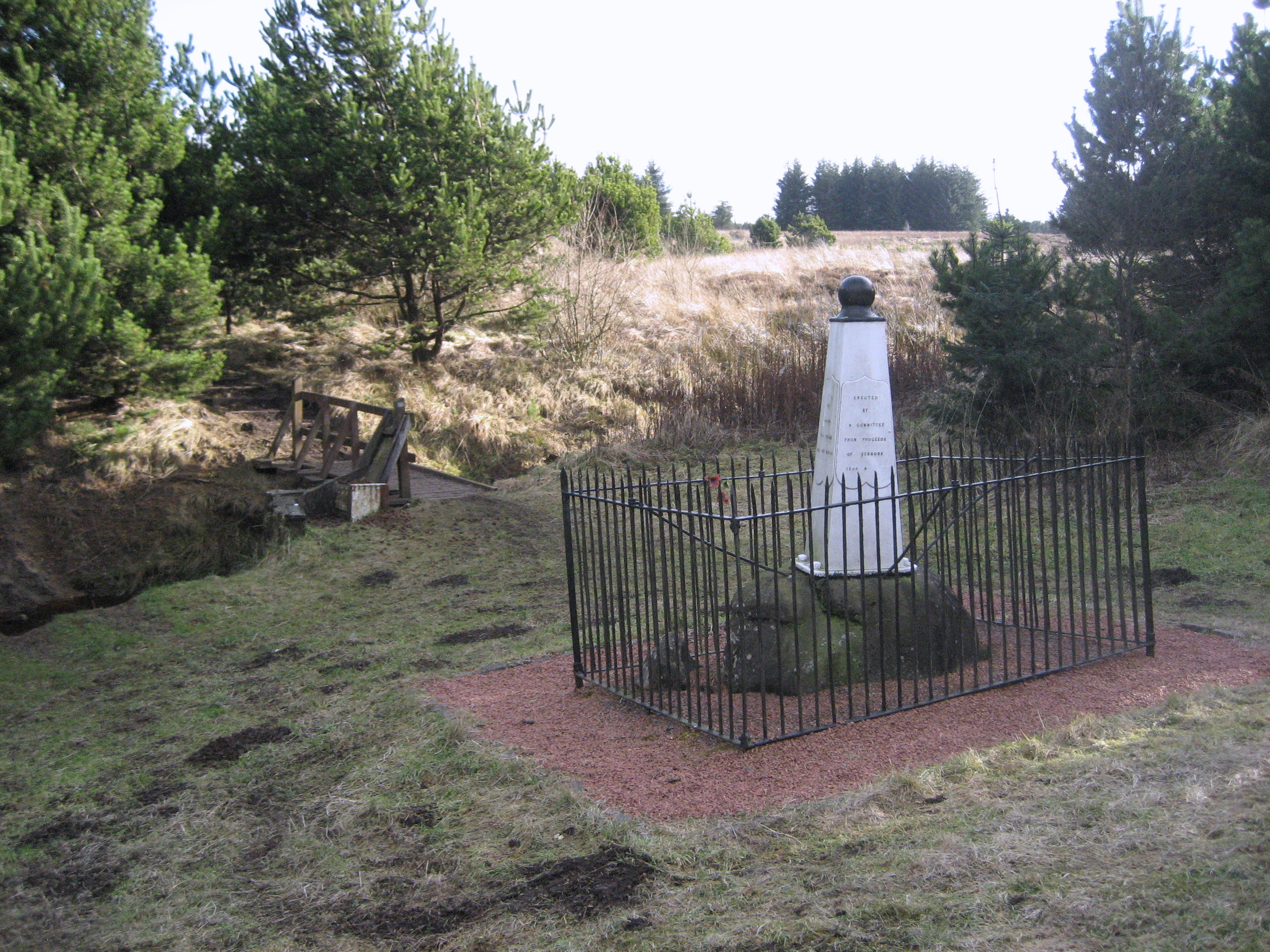
Peden stone Harthill, Shotts near the modern Alexander Peden Primary School

The Alexander Peden Stone south of Harthill, Shotts was one of the places where Rev. Alexander Peden and others were said to have preached to Covenanters. The monument was erected around 1866 and is maintained by a local Covenanters' committee. The stone on which the monument is mounted would have been used as the plinth by preachers.

== Bibliography ==
- The Lord's Trumpet sounding an Alarm against Scotland by Warning of a Bloody Sword; being the substance of a Preface and two Prophetical Sermons preached at Glenluce, Anno 1682, by that great Scottish Prophet, Mr. Alexander Peden, late Minister of the Gospel at New Glenluce in Galloway,' was published at Glasgow in 1739, and reprinted in 1779.
- Letters to Mr Patrick Simson (and others)
- The Life and Prophecies of Alexander Peden by Patrick Walker
- Histories of Kirkton and Wodrow
- Howie's Scottish Worthies
- New Statistical Account of Scotland
- Hew Scott's Fasti Eccles. Scot. i. 168
- Scott's Old Mortality, note 18
- Watson's Life and Times of Peden, Glasgow, 1881.
- Reid's Ireland, ii.
- Six Saints of the Covenant, ed. by D. Hay Fleming pp. 45–178
- Johnston's Alexander Peden, the Prophet of the Covenant, and Treasury of the Scottish Covenant
- Todd's Homes, Haunts, and Battlefields of the Covenanters
- Jean L. Watson's Life and Times of Peden
- Hewat's Peden the Prophet
- Carslaw's Exiles of the Covenant
- Tombstone
- Dictionary of National Biography
- Biographia Presbyteriana

== See also ==
- Brahan Seer – Alleged Scottish prophet of the 17th century
- Peden's Cave, Craigie
- Lady of Lawers – 17th-century Scottish prophetess
- Thomas the Rhymer – 13th-century Scottish laird and reputed prophet from Earlston
