= John Brown of Priesthill =

Scottish Presbyterian martyr (1627–1685)

John Brown
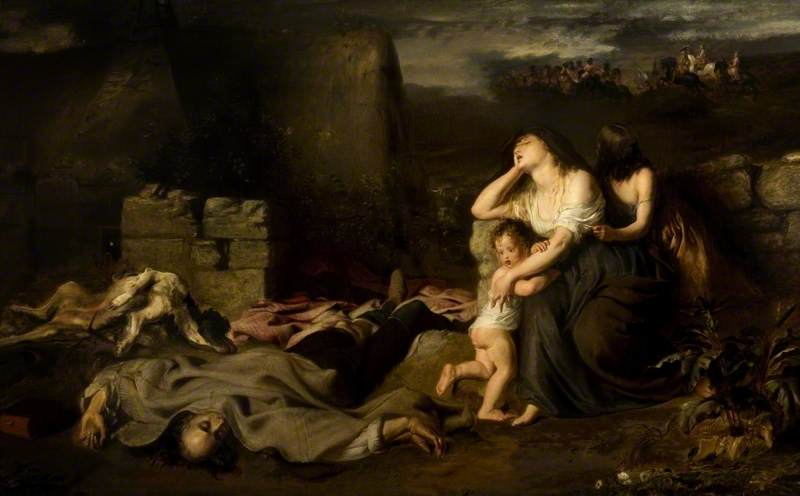
- The Martyrdom of John Brown of Priesthill, 1685
- Church: Reformed Presbyterian Church of Scotland

Personal details
- Born: John Brown
- Died: 1685 Priesthill
- Denomination: Presbyterian

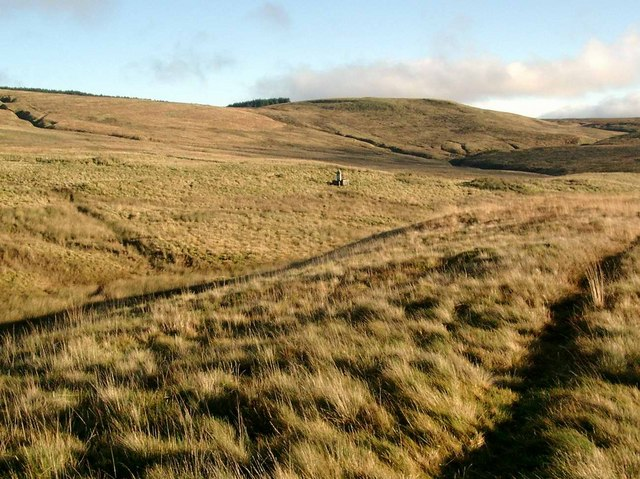
The remote Martyr's Grave of John Brown

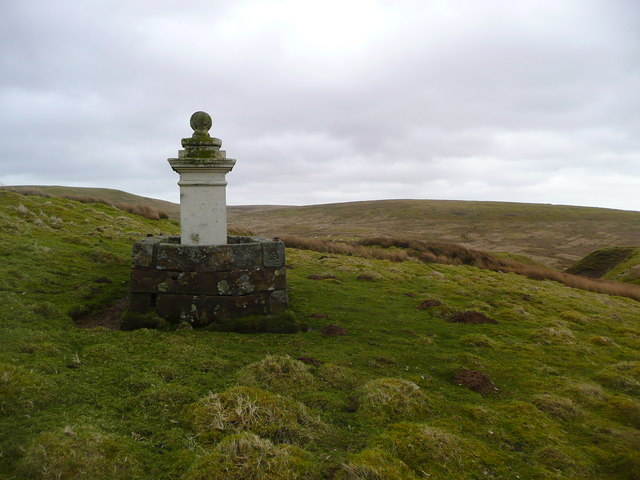
Monument at the Martyrs Grave

John Brown (1627–1685), also known as the Christian Carrier, was a Protestant Covenanter from Priesthill farm, a few miles from Muirkirk in Ayrshire, Scotland. He became a Presbyterian martyr in 1685.

Among the numerous executions carried out by the government during The Killing Time of the 1680s, the allegations of brutality make this event one of the most controversial illustrations of the character of John Graham of Claverhouse, afterwards Viscount Dundee.

== Background ==
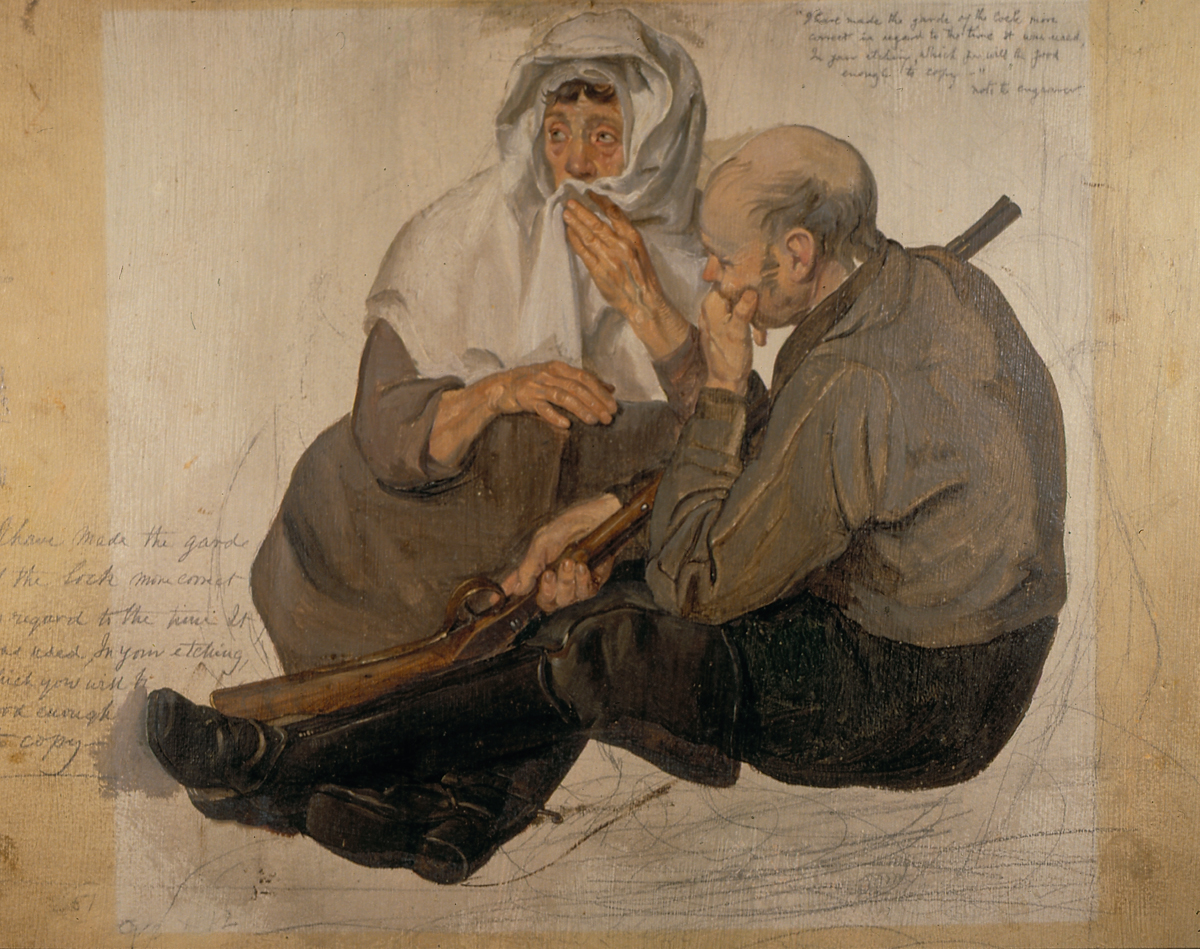
Covenanters, George Harvey. Stirling Smith Art Gallery & Museum; Study for The Covenanters' Preaching

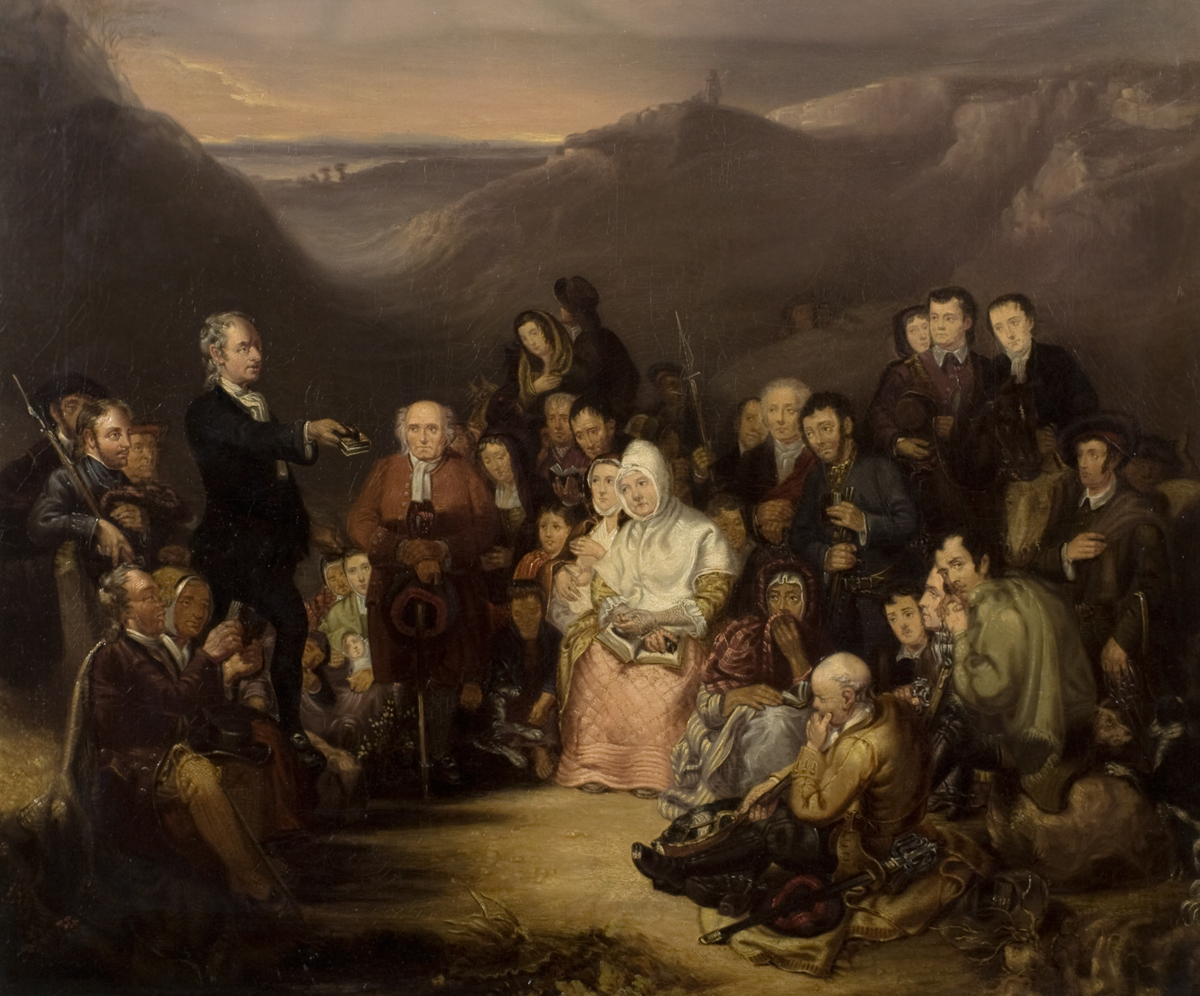
The Covenanter's Preaching, George Harvey, 1830. Dundee Art Galleries and Museums Collection

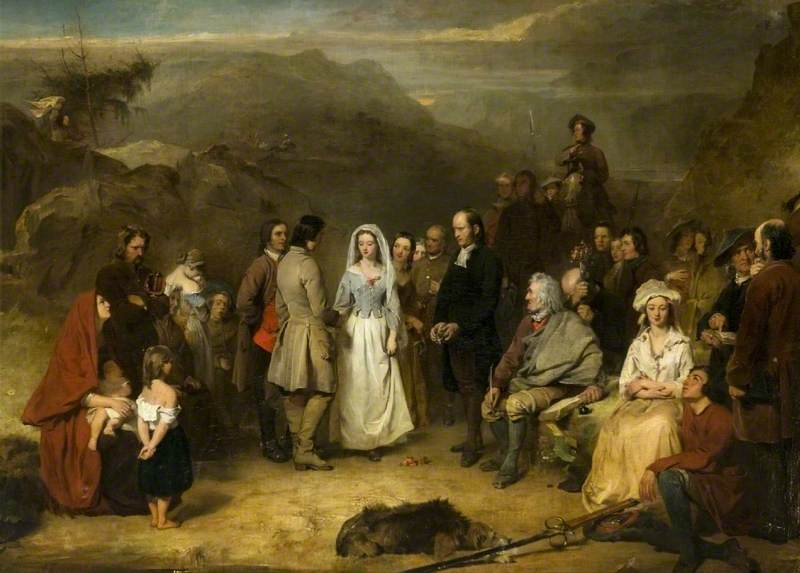
The Marriage of the Covenanter, Alexander Johnston (1815–1891). Alexander Peden conducted the marriage of John Brown at Priesthill in Muirkirk parish in 1682

In order to protect the Presbyterian polity and Calvinist doctrine of the Church of Scotland, the pre-Restoration government of Scotland signed the 1650 Treaty of Breda with King Charles II to crown him king and support him against the English Parliamentary forces. At his Restoration in 1660, the King renounced the terms of the Treaty and his Oath of Covenant, which the Scottish Covenanters saw as a betrayal. The Rescissory Act 1661 repealed all laws made since 1633, effectively ejecting 400 Ministers from their livings, restoring patronage in the appointment of ministers to congregations and allowing the king to proclaim the restoration of bishops to the Church of Scotland. The Abjuration Act of 1662 ..was a formal rejection of the National Covenant of 1638 and the Solemn League and Covenant of 1643. These were declared to be against the fundamental laws of the kingdom. The Act required all persons taking public office to take the Oath of Abjuration not to take arms against the king, and rejecting the Covenants. This excluded most Presbyterians from holding official positions of trust.

The resulting disappointment with Charles II's religious policy became civil unrest and erupted in violence during the early summer of 1679 with the assassination of Archbishop Sharp, Drumclog and the Battle of Bothwell Bridge. The Sanquhar Declaration of 1680 effectively declared the people could not accept the authority of a king who would not recognise their religion, nor commit to his previous oaths. In February 1685 the king died and was succeeded by his Roman Catholic brother, the Duke of York, as King James VII.

== Life ==
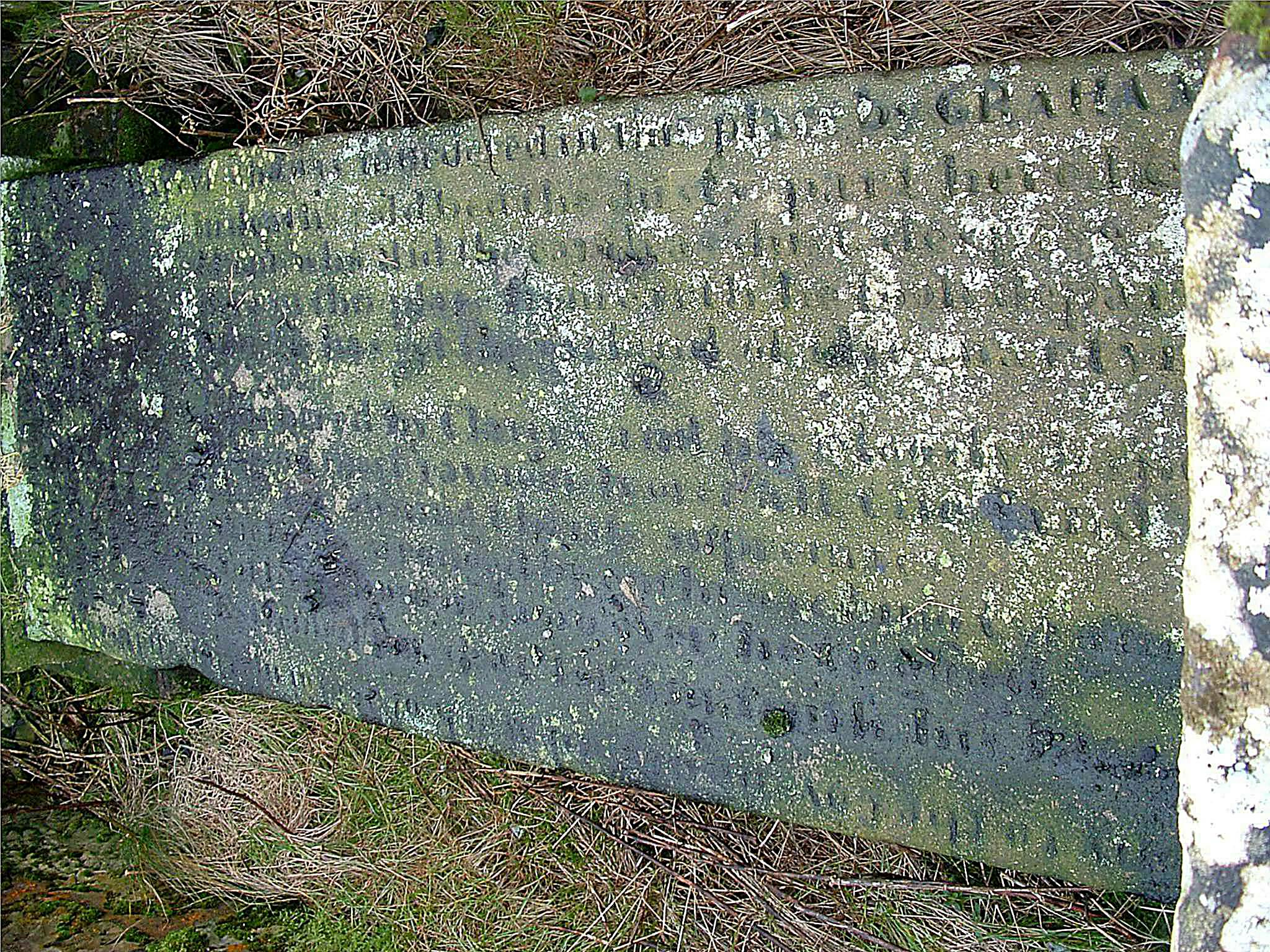
John Brown (1627–1685) Martyrs Gravestone

Acrostic poem engraved on Brown's gravestone

John Brown lived in a remote farm called Priesthill, in the upland parish of Muirkirk in Kyle, Ayrshire, where he cultivated a small piece of ground and acted as a carrier. Wodrow describes him as 'of shining piety', and one who had 'great measures of solid digested knowledge, and had a singular talent of a most plain and affecting way of communicating his knowledge to others, he had employed his leisure in instructing youths.' He had fought with the Covenanters at the battle of Bothwell Bridge (1679), and was on intimate terms with the leaders of the persecuted party. In 1682, Alexander Peden, one of the chief of these, married him to his second wife, Marion Weir. On this occasion Peden, according to Walker, foretold the husband's early and violent end: 'Keep linen by you for his winding-sheet'.

He was shot on the morning of 1 May 1685, in a summary execution instigated by John Graham of Claverhouse under the emergency powers given him by the Privy Council to suppress insurrection in the South West of the country.

== Death ==
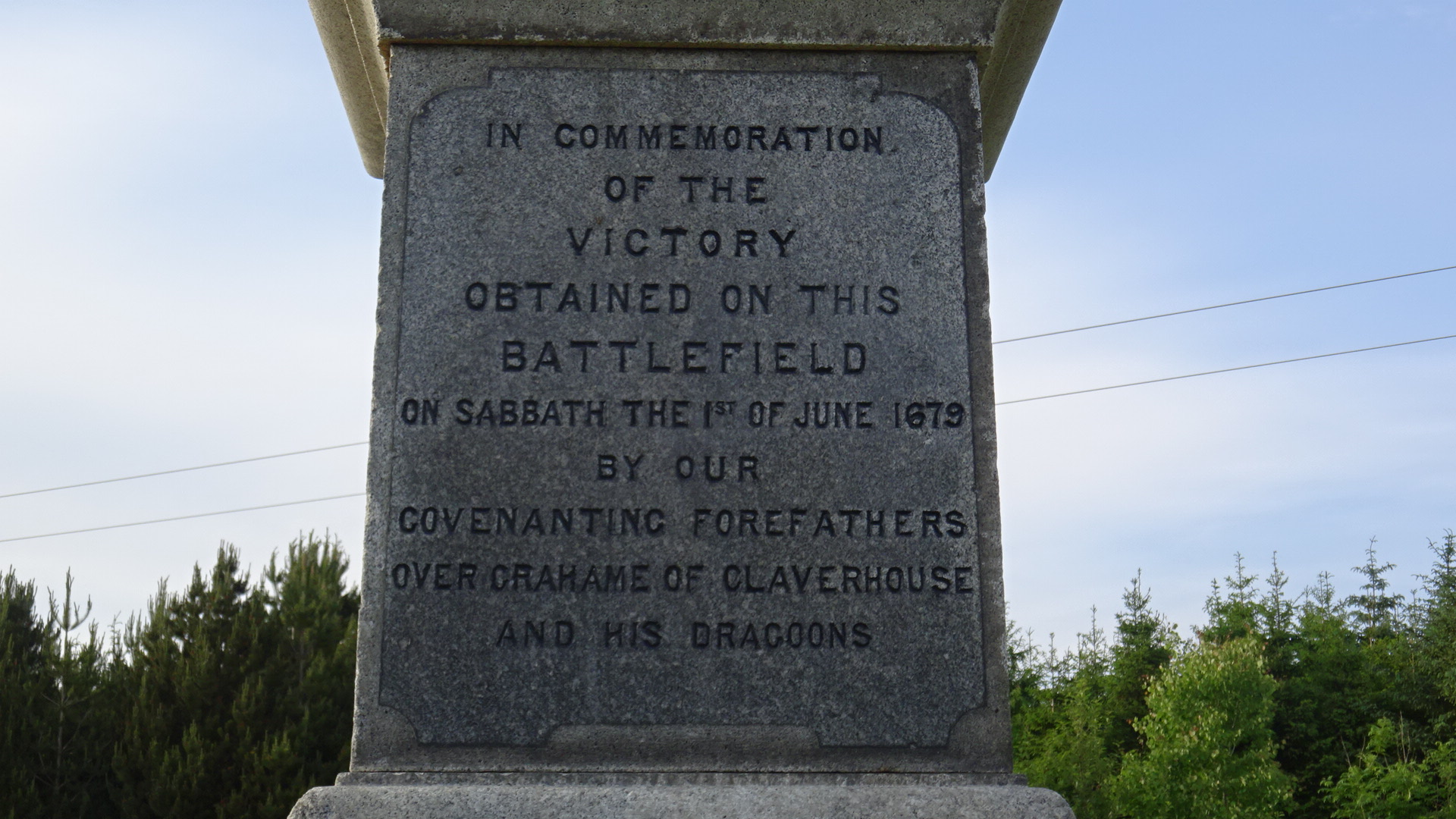
Battle of Drumclog Memorial inscription

In 1685, Brown was captured (along with his nephew, one 'John Brownen') by a troop of horse under the command of Graham of Claverhouse. Brown's house was searched where 'bullets, match and treasonable documents' were found. Brown was offered the chance to take the Oath of Abjuration. Brown refused to swear the oath which was designed to be repugnant to Covenanters and thereby a "sieve, the mesh of which would winnow the loyal from the disloyal".

At the time, failure to take the Oath was a capital offence and thus defying the King was high treason; this was a fact of which Brown was well aware. 'John Brownen' then made testimony that John Brown had in fact been 'in armes' at Drumclog and Bothwell Bridge. An underground house was discovered which contained weapons which Brown stated belonged to his uncle – John Brown.

== Controversy ==
Much of what we know of his life has come from contemporary accounts of the dramatic events of the morning on which he died. A number of clearly polemical accounts were produced in the years following while eyewitnesses remained living and their accounts could be assembled. These (except Howie) were written after the Revolution but while the Jacobite threat was still alive. It is these accounts which have been influential in setting a reputation of cruelty on the part of Claverhouse.

A second level of detail was published in the late 19th century by revisionists chiefly concerned with reassessing and redefining Claverhouse's reputation. Mark Napier's work is an overt paean on the life of his hero Claverhouse, while Charles Sandford Terry takes a more modern approach to the source documents, but expresses his views nevertheless. These both publish a letter from Claverhouse to the Duke of Queensberry, the Lord High Treasurer, the head of the Scottish government, in which Claverhouse defends his actions taken in executing John Brown. Not surprisingly, he is sparse on detail of the summary execution. 'I caused shoot him dead, which he suffered very inconcernedly.' This contrasts with his great detail on the reasons and evidence against Brown.

Napier and Terry cite this letter as an example of Claverhouse's professionalism in law enforcement, simply following orders. Wodrow and others do not dispute that Brown was guilty under the draconian laws, but question the morality of those laws and highlight the cruelty of Claverhouse in carrying out the sentence. A memorial was erected after his death and a more permanent stone plinth put in place in 1828. The site, on the remote hillside above Muirkirk, is still the destination of visitors to pay their respects and sits on an ancient upland path that runs to Lesmahagow.

== Shooting ==
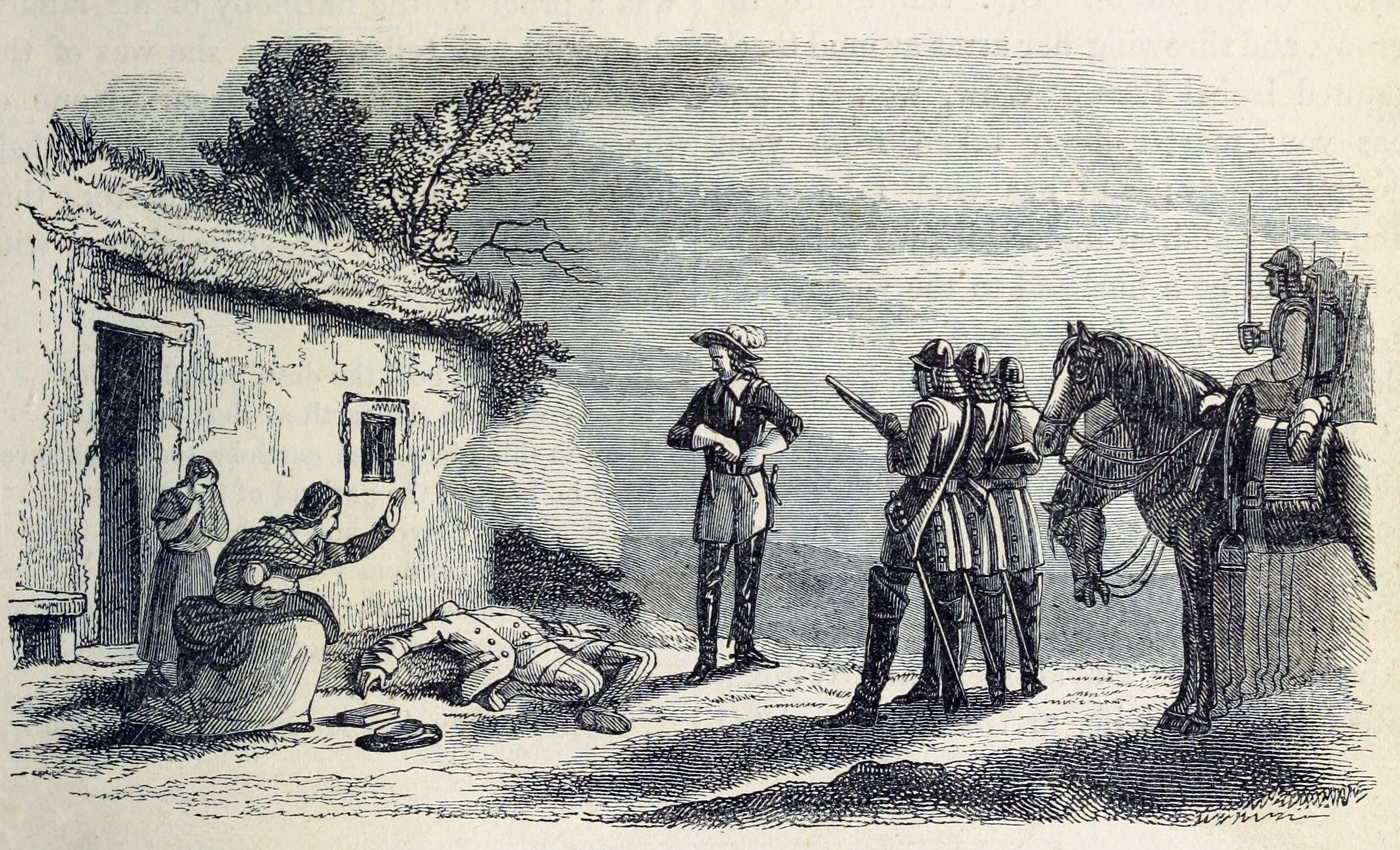
The death of John Brown of Priesthill from Scots Worthies

Several stories were published by Covenanting commentators after his death, each with slightly different detail. Patrick Walker describes six troopers who shot Brown, and that "the most part of the bullets fell upon his head", Wodrow says that the dragoons were so moved to tears after Brown prayed that they refused to obey Claverhouse's orders and that he himself had to shoot – for fear of mutiny – adds Howie.

While Alexander Shields writing only five years later mentions that Brown was shot in front of his house in the presence of his wife, Wodrow says his wife was pregnant and that his infant son was also present. Walker makes no mention of his wife being pregnant but that his son and a child from a previous marriage were present.

== Bibliography ==
- Wodrow's History of the Sufferings of the Church of Scotland. Edin. 1721-2
- Walker's Life of Peden, &c. 1727, Glasgow, 1868
- Napier's Life and Times of John Graham, Edin. 1862, contains Claverhouse's Report, together with a defence of his conduct
- Thomson's edition of A Cloud of Witnesses (1713), Edin. 1871, gives (pp. 574–5) an account of the monument, with copy of inscription
- a chap-book Life of Brown was published at Stirling in 1828

== Notes ==
Attribution

This article incorporates text from a publication now in the public domain: Watt, Francis (1886). "Brown, John (1627?-1685)". In Stephen, Leslie (ed.). Dictionary of National Biography. Vol. 7. London: Smith, Elder & Co.
