= Brahan Seer =

Alleged Scottish prophet of the 17th century

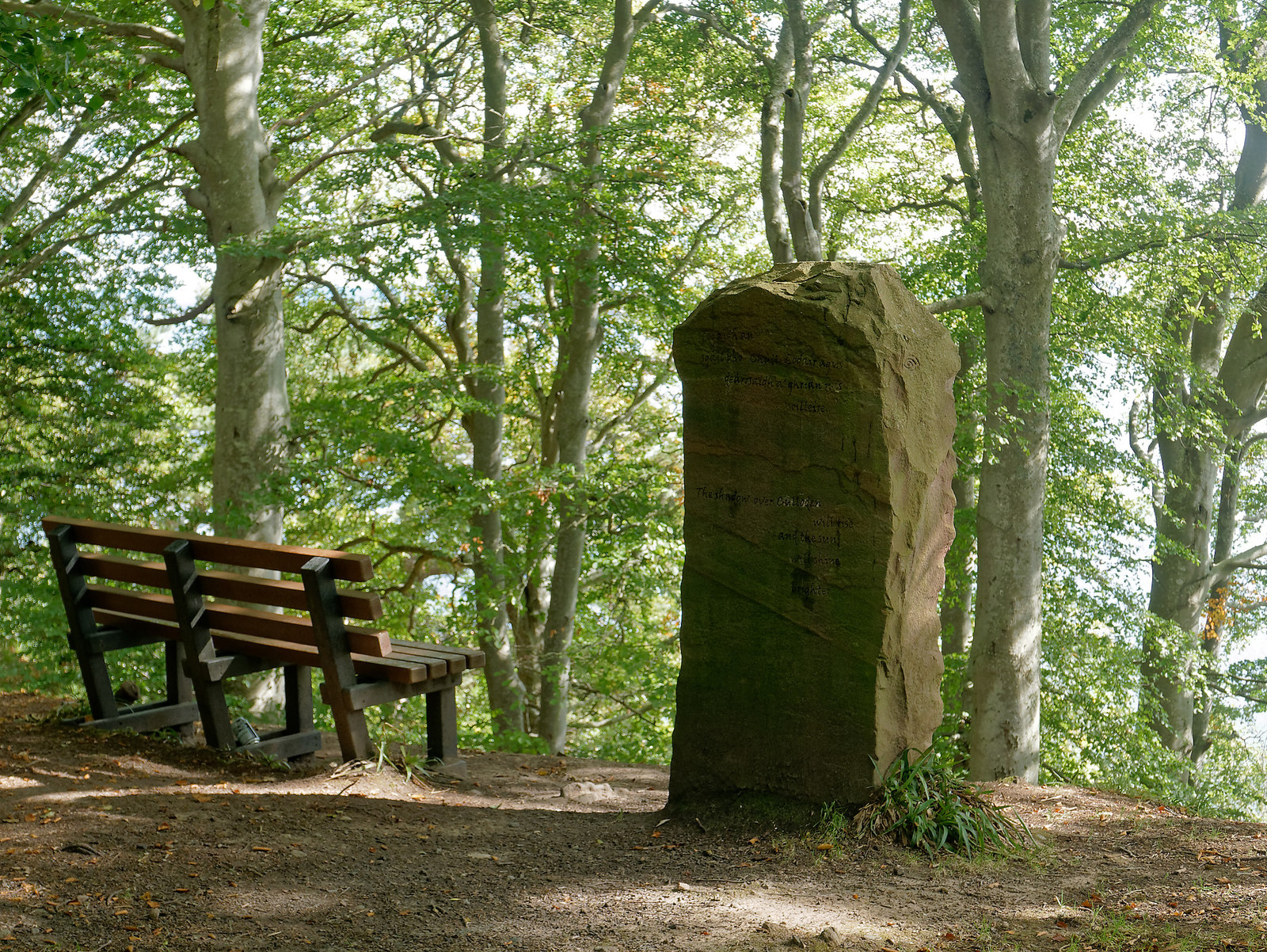
Brahan Seer Stone in Craig Wood. It is inscribed in both English and Scottish Gaelic with the words "The shadow over Culloden will rise and the sun will shine brighter".

The Brahan Seer, known in his native Scottish Gaelic as Coinneach Odhar ("Dark Kenneth"), and Kenneth Mackenzie, was, according to legend, a predictor of the future who lived in the 17th century.

The Brahan Seer is regarded by some to be the creation of the folklorist Alexander MacKenzie (1838–1898) whose accounts occur well after some of the events the Seer is claimed to have predicted. Others have also questioned whether the Seer existed at all.

Hugh Miller (1802-1856), in his Scenes and Legends of the North of Scotland (first edition 1835) gives an account of Kenneth Ore, a Highlander of Ross-shire, who could foresee events by looking through a white stone. Several of the predictions given in the book are the same as in the later book by Alexander MacKenzie.

== Early life ==
Mackenzie is said to have come from Uig (Lewis) on lands owned by the Seaforths, and to have been of the Clan Mackenzie. He is better known, however, for his connections to Brahan Castle near Dingwall, and the Black Isle in Easter Ross, where he moved later in life.

He is thought to have used an Adder stone, a stone with a hole in the middle, to see his visions. The Brahan Seer worked for Kenneth Mackenzie, 3rd Earl of Seaforth.

As with Nostradamus, who wrote in Provençal, most of his prophecies are best known in translation. There are no contemporary manuscripts or accounts of his predictions, so it is impossible to verify them.

He is claimed to have prophesied, or his prophecies have been interpreted as referring to, the Battle of Culloden, the Highland Clearances, the building of the Caledonian Canal, the discovery of North Sea oil, and Margaret Thatcher.

Having become famous as a diviner and wit in the west, he was invited to Seaforth territory in the east, to work as a labourer at Brahan Castle near Dingwall, in what is now the area of Easter Ross, where he met his downfall.

== Death ==
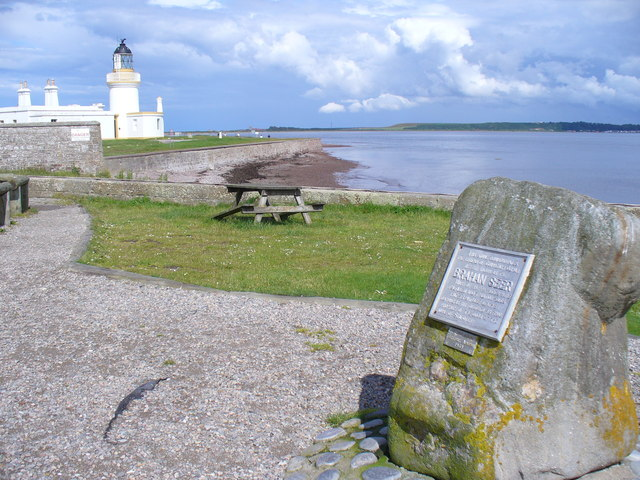
Memorial stone at Chanonry Point

The Brahan Seer was supposedly burnt in barrel of tar at Chanonry Point on the orders of Lady Seaforth, wife of the 3rd Earl of Seaforth. The Seer informed Lady Seaforth of her husband's unfaithfulness whilst away in Paris. Lady Seaforth considered it an insult and ordered that McKenzie be put to death.

== Historical evidence ==
There is no historical evidence that a prophet known as "Kenneth Mackenzie" existed. For example, it is alleged that Mackenzie was born on the Isle of Lewis during the early 1600s but no historical documentation or records demonstrate this.

Historian William Matheson has argued that Alexander Mackenzie's statements about Coinneach Odhar living in the 17th century were inaccurate. There are two records for a Coinneach Odhar, a sixteenth century man who was accused of witchcraft. For example, there is a Scottish Parliament record, dated 1577, for a writ of his arrest. Such details contradict the statements of Mackenzie and those passed down through folklore.

== See also ==
- Alexander Peden – Scottish covenanter and prophet (1626–1686)
- Lady of Lawers – 17th century Scottish prophet
- Thomas the Rhymer – 13th-century Scottish laird and reputed prophet from Earlston

== Bibliography ==
- Hugh Miller. (1835). Scenes and Legends of the North of Scotland, or The traditional history of Cromarty. Edinburgh: A. and C. Black.
- Hilda Roderick Ellis Davidson. (1989). The Seer in Celtic and Other Traditions. John Donald Publishers.
- John Keay, Julia Keay. (2000). Collins Encyclopaedia of Scotland. HarperCollins.
- Alexander Mackenzie. (1899). The Prophecies of the Brahan Seer. Inverness.
- Alex Sutherland. (2009). The Brahan Seer: The Making of a Legend. Verlag Peter Lang. (thesis version online)
- Elizabeth Sutherland. (1985). Ravens & Black Rain: The Story of Highland Second Sight, Including a New Collection of the Prophecies of the Brahan Seer. Constable.
- Elizabeth Sutherland. (1996). The Seer of Kintail. Constable & Robinson.

== See also ==
- Thomas the Rhymer
