= Lady of Lawers =

17th-century Scottish prophetess

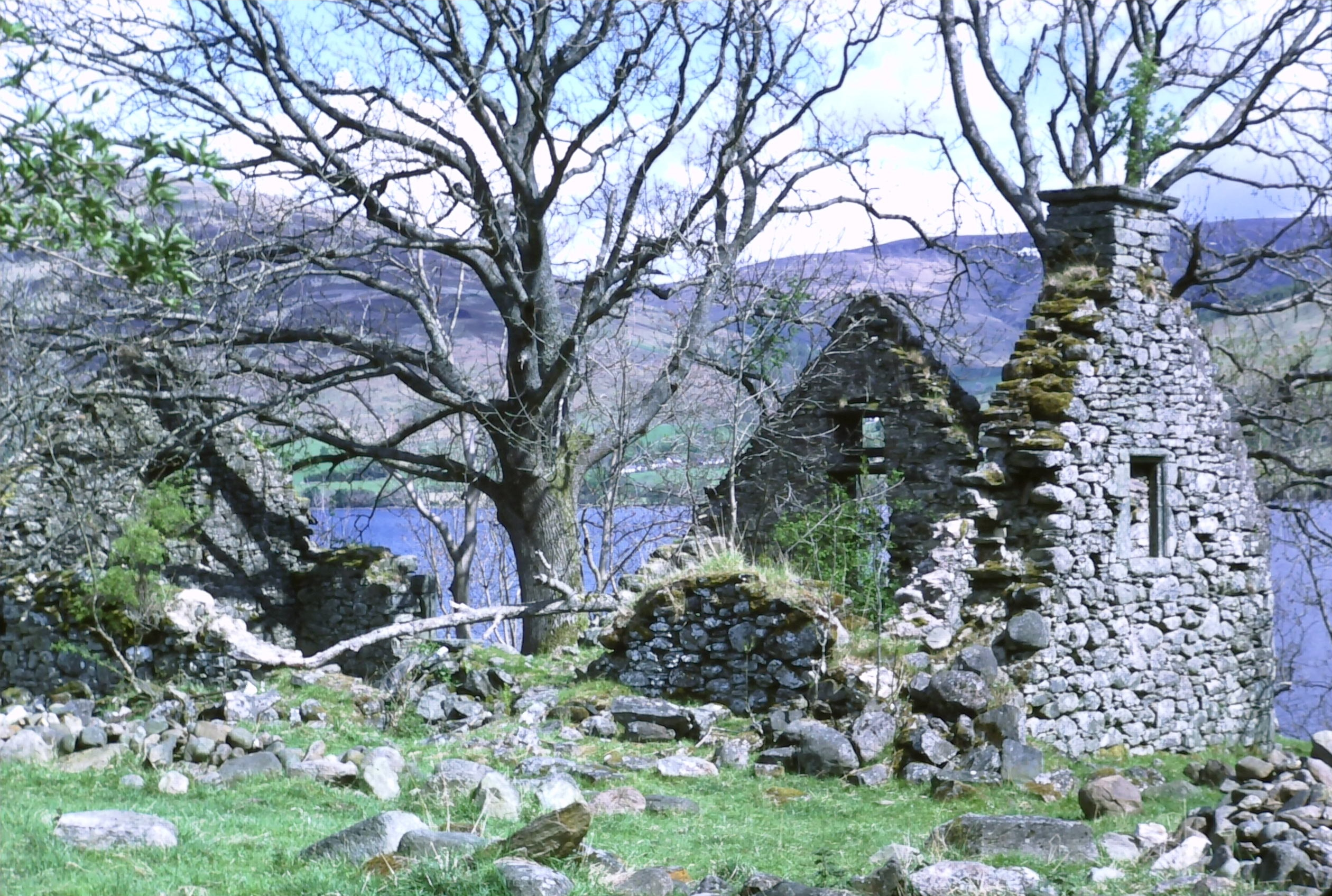
A ruined cottage in the abandoned original village of Lawers on the north side of Loch Tay in 1981, where the Lady lived.

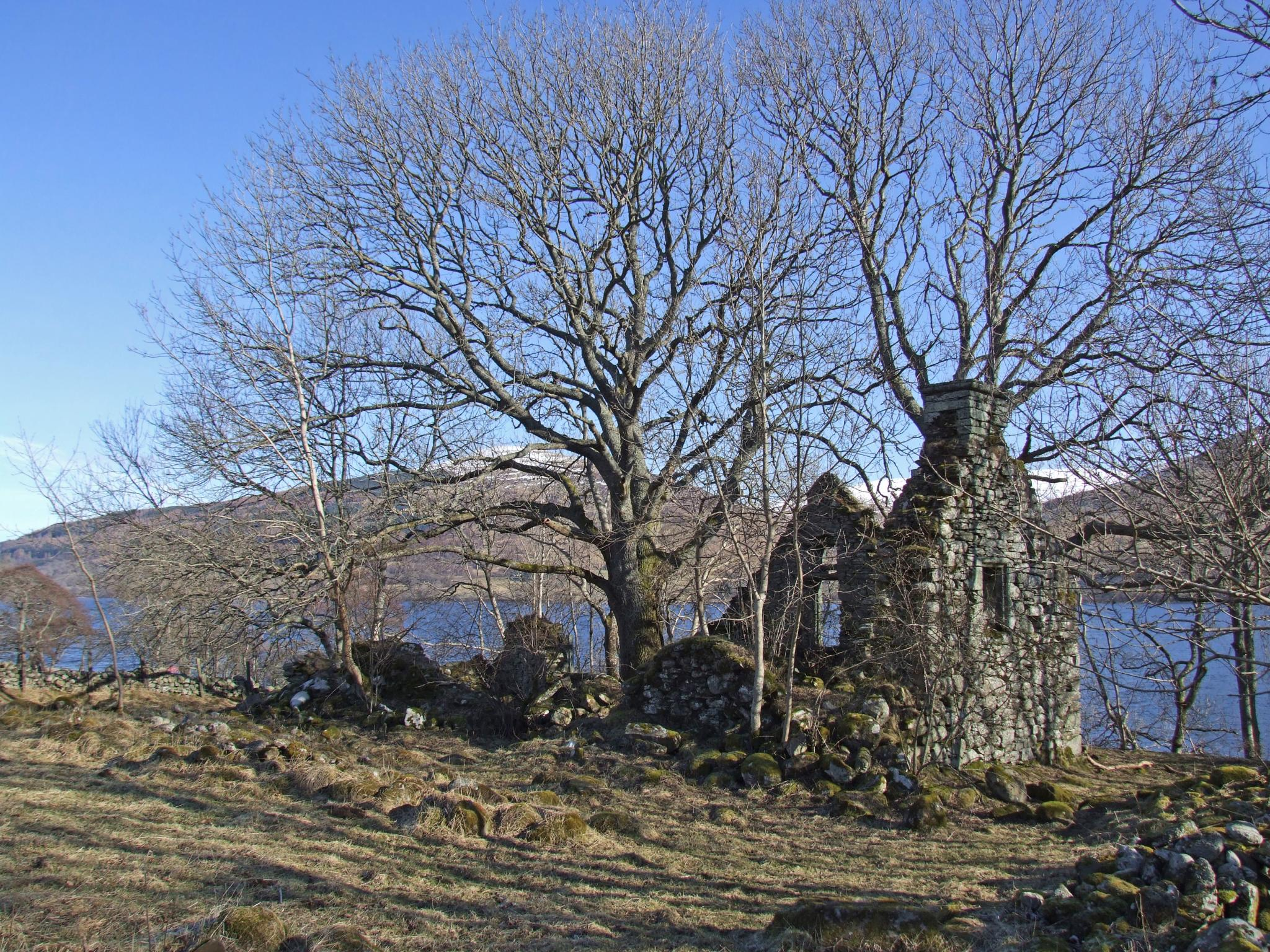
The old village of Lawers, circa 2011

The Lady of Lawers (Scottish Gaelic: Baintighearna Labhair) is a figure in Scottish folklore, remembered as a reputed 17th-century prophetess associated with Lawers, on the north shore of Loch Tay in Perthshire. Her historical identity has not been securely established. Surviving accounts generally describe her as a woman from the Appin district of the Scottish Highlands who married into the local Campbell family around 1650, but disagree over her name, ancestry, and her husband's position within the family. Later tradition placed her alongside Thomas the Rhymer, the Brahan Seer, and other Scottish prophetic figures.

The Lawers family into which she is said to have married had fallen into poverty. Its castle was destroyed in 1644 by the army of James Graham, 1st Marquess of Montrose, and the local Campbells later lived as tenants on land held against debts to Stirling merchants. Their holdings were transferred around 1672 to the Glenorchy branch of the family, later the earls of Breadalbane. A church was built beside the rebuilt House of Lawers in 1669 and served the communities on the north shore of Loch Tay. The Lady is said to have planted an ash tree beside the church and, by later tradition, was buried beneath it with her servant, An Combach Ruadh.

Numerous prophecies are attributed to the Lady of Lawers. Transmitted orally in Gaelic and first recorded in writing in the late 19th century, they concern chiefly the fortunes of the house and lands of Breadalbane, the Lawers church and its ash tree, changes in Highland agriculture and society, and disasters on Loch Tay. Some sayings attributed to her were also associated with other seers. One prediction, that sheep skulls would make the plough useless, circulated in several Gaelic songs and was later interpreted as a response to the agricultural and social disruption of the Highland Clearances.

Her prophecies were recorded in antiquarian and folkloric works, including those of John Gregorson Campbell, and local versions were still being collected by the School of Scottish Studies in the 1960s. She remains one of the figures most closely associated with Old Lawers and the prophetic traditions of Perthshire.

== History ==
The identity of the historical woman associated with the Lady of Lawers tradition has not been securely established. Surviving accounts generally place her arrival at Lawers around 1650 through marriage into the local Campbell family, but disagree over her origins and her husband's position within the Lawers branch. She became one of the figures most closely associated with the old village and with Perthshire's regional traditions of prophecy.

=== From Appin to Loch Tay ===
Historic Environment Scotland describes the Lady of Lawers as "one of the most well-known inhabitants of Old Lawers Village", and states that she is said to have been the wife of one of the lairds of Lawers in the 17th century. The Lady of Lawers was Mary, likely of the Colquhoun or MacCombaich families, and came from the Appin district in the Scottish Highlands. Her accurate real name is now believed lost to history, according to The Scots Magazine. In Gaelic tradition, the Lady of Lawers was known as Baintighearna Labhair. The Lady was a notable Scottish prophet. She was renowned in Perthshire, and the prophecies associated with her and comparable regional seers were generally local in nature. Prophecies attributed to the Lady include a variety of expressions handed down as Gaelic traditions.

Circa 1650, Mary wed a son or brother of Sir James Campbell of Lawers, described in records as the 4th or 6th laird of Lawers, of the Campbell of Lawers family, and moved southeast to Perthshire, to live on a Loch Tay farm. According to the Kirk Session historical records kept by the Church of Scotland from Kenmore, Perth and Kinross, a retinue accompanied the Lady figure to Lochtayside around the center of Loch Tay. The Lady's accompanying group was known locally as Na Combaich, the Companions, and were identified as originating from the Stewart family in the Appin district in Argyll county. The Lochtayside lands the Lady moved to when joining the Lawers Campbells had been granted to Clan Campbell of Glenorchy (later the Campbell baronetcy in the County of Perth) in 1473 and afterwards formally feued to a cadet branch of that family, who held their own formal royal crown charter by 1513.

=== Time in Lawers ===
The local Castle of Lawers was destroyed in 1644 by the Highlander army of James Graham, 1st Marquess of Montrose, who opposed the Campbells, during the Wars of the Three Kingdoms. The main host of the Campbells took up Fordew, today known as Fordie near Crieff as part of the Monzievaird estate as their seat. It is probable that the Lady and her Campbell husband took up residence on the Loch Tay farm after the house had been reportedly rebuilt, circa 1645. Their home was a rented thatched house at the time; the local Lochtayside Campbells were then impoverished at the time the Lady joined them. Due to the losses of the Campbells and the local estate being held to secure debts with Stirling merchants, the Lady and her husband were forced to live as tenants on their family's own land. By then, the remainder of the Campbell branch that the Lady had joined took up residence to the east in Strathearn. While the broader Campbell family was wealthy and held lands from Loch Tay to the western coasts, the local Campbells of Lochtayside lived in a land described by historian A.C. McKerracher as being in "abject poverty".

At the time, old Lawers was a busy and growing port across Loch Tay from Ardtalnaig, Perth and Kinross, with sufficient growth and wealth to sustain the construction of a new church. The new church was raised in 1669 next door to the rebuilt House of Lawers, which stood on the same site on the prior laird's that had been previously destroyed. The Lady is said to have planted a large and long-lived ash tree beside the church on its northern side, which would feature later in various prophecies attributed to her. The new Lawers church at the Campbell home was the only such institution at the time on the north shores of Loch Tay, and served all of the local Lochtayside communities at the time. The Lawers Campbells continued over time to struggle in their time at the rental home by the church, in poverty and with financial problems. The ruined home of the Lady remains near to the banks of the north side of Loch Tay, between Killin and Kenmore, southeast of the modern Lawers village on the A827 roadway.

=== Finlarig Castle to today ===
By 1672, their financial challenges led to the Lawers Campbells being forced to transfer and sell their local Lawers holdings to their northern Glen Orchy Campbell kin. The Lady and the Loch Tay Campbells moved to the southwest end of the loch and lived in Finlarig Castle, on a peninsula on the southwest end of Loch Tay at Killin. The Lady reportedly had a notable dislike of and antipathy towards the branch of their Campbell family from Glen Orchy to the northeast. The local Campbell branches had been in feuds with one another since the era of Duncan Campbell of Glenorchy (1545-1631). The Glenorchy kin of the Lady's Lochsaytide Campbells would later be installed under the Peerage of Scotland as Earl of Breadalbane and Holland. The Book of the Dean of Lismore, a 16th-century manuscript, contained the poem "Is fuath liom". In the manuscript, the poem is a list of hated things, including in Gaelic the term "Is fuath liom baintigerna labha", which Danielle Fatzinger of the University of Glasgow translated to English as "I hate a speaking (i.e., an outspoken) lady", and used it as an example of misogynistic tone in such ancient poetry. Fatzinger wrote that "Baintigerna labhar" may have been an explicit contemporaneous reference to the Lady of Lawers.

In 1892, local historian John Christie wrote that the last occupant of the Lawers family residence was known in Scottish Gaelic as Baintighearna Lauthair (Lady of Lawers) and that local histories identified her as a Stewart of the Appin branch who possessed a gift of prophecy. In 1900, the Lady was identified as being of the Breadalbane family. Despite documented surrounding histories, lore, records, and traditions, William A. Gillies reported in his 1938 work In Famed Breadalbane that there remained no definitive identification of the possible woman such as Mary Stewart of Appin in the Loch Tay area, but that the evidence supported that such a person existed. The Lady, at her request, was buried at the old Lawers church, and her loyal servant, identified as An Combach Ruadh (the Red Fox) was later buried with her. The burial site was reportedly beneath the Lady's ash tree. Through the late 19th and into the 20th century, the ruins of the original Ladies house in old Lawer was called Tigh Ban-tighearna Labhuir, "the House of the Lady of Lawers."

The remains of the Lady of Lawers's homes and the old original Lawers village was recorded as being in disrepair by the early 19th century, and the settlement it served was largely abandoned, though part of the village remained occupied into the early 20th century. In 2016, the property and land on which the old Lawers village and the ruins of the church, including the area where the Lady may be buried with her Red Fox servant, was placed on sale for offers beginning at £100,000. It was believed that any future owners of the lands would be unable to build new structures, as previous owners had been denied by local authorities due to the historic nature of the site. Local lore and myth holds that the Lady haunts the ruins of old Lawers as a ghost. The Lady of Lawers today is the most notable and known former resident of Lawers in Scotland.

== Lady of Lawers's well ==
A spring near the summit of Ben Lawers was known in Gaelic as Fuaran Bhaintighearna Labhair, the Lady of Lawers's Well. Writing in the Transactions of the Gaelic Society of Inverness, the Breadalbane antiquarian James MacDiarmid recorded that in his grandfather's youth the young men and maidens of Lawers climbed the mountain at Beltane to watch the sun rise, and that the young men raced to be first to reach the spring and drink from it. MacDiarmid described the custom as belonging to a former generation rather than to his own time, noting it was still a custom in his "grandfather's youth". The Celtic scholar George Henderson, citing MacDiarmid, instead reported that children were dipped in the waters of the Lady of Lawers's Well at Beltane and ritually sprayed by the waters at sunrise. MacDiarmid attributes that rite to a different spring, a tobar on the farm of Claggan on the opposite shore of Loch Tay, which was said to hold curative virtues for children.

== Prophecies ==
The Lady's 17th century predictions and prophecies were at first only passed forward as oral Gaelic tradition and myth; their first known commitment in writing was in the late 19th century. The prophecies were believed to have been preserved in the "Red Book of Balloch", a claimed part of the Books of Clanranald; a barrel-shaped book secured by twelve iron hoops or clasps and kept in the charter room of Taymouth Castle in Kenmore, Perth and Kinross. The Scottish folklorist John Gregorson Campbell wrote that it was believed the prophecies of the Lady were written in the volume.

=== Boar stone ===
One of the Lady of Lawers's prophecies concerned what was called the Boar Stone, which Campbell described as a boulder weighing approximately two or three hundred tons in a meadow near Loch Tay. It was predicted to topple when a "strange heir" came to Taymouth. The house of Breadalbane was also said to reach the height of its honour when the face of an unidentified rock became concealed by wood.

=== Breadalbane ===
In a recording preserved by the School of Scottish Studies, Perthshire resident William Forbes recounted a tradition that the Lady of Lawers had predicted the end of the Breadalbane estate. Her prophecies principally concerned the house and lands of Breadalbane. In local recordings from 1965, James Anderson MacDiarmid noted that the Lady was not remembered as vindictive, despite the nature of some her "neighborhood" prophecies. McKerracher recorded a prophecy concerning the Breadalbane family: "The last laird will pass over Glenogle with a gray pony leaving nothing behind." McKerracher described how the sight of the Countess of Breadalbane travelling from Killin railway station in 1946 prompted Kinnell House gardener James Anderson to recall the prediction, because her trap was pulled by a gray pony. He presented the 1948 sale of Kinnell House and the ninth Earl's subsequent journey across Glenogle as the prophecy's fulfilment, noting that Anderson travelled with the pony by train.

=== Feather of the goose ===
An example of prophecy and cultural expressions attributed to the Lady include that a "feather of the goose would drive the memory from man", which Gillies compared to the advent of writing negatively impacting the "power of remembrance". According to Gillies, the printing press and books, while expanding literacy across the Highlands, came at the price of the loss of "olden days" when some Highlanders "could recite thousands of lines of poetry from memory".

=== Fir tree regrown ===
Michael Newton identified a prophecy attributed to her, which apparently survives only in English translation, as an example of the tree symbolism found in Gaelic oral narrative. According to the prophecy, the MacNab lands would be incorporated into the Breadalbane estates when a broken branch from one fir tree fell upon another fir and grew as part of it. Newton notes that trees in Gaelic symbolism more commonly represent individuals or dynasties than their possessions, and interprets the grafting of the two trees as a metaphor for the amalgamation of family legacies.

=== Lawers Church and ash tree traditions ===
The Lady's earliest recorded and first prophecy coincided with the timing of the building of the new Lawers church in 1669 adjacent to the rebuilt House of Lawers. The traditional prophecy maintained that if the top stone were ever placed on Lawers Church, none of the Lady's predictions would come true. She was also said to have predicted that the church would split when the red cairn on Ben Lawers fell. Campbell reported that a cairn erected on Ben Lawers by sappers and miners fell in the same year as the Disruption in the Church of Scotland, in 1843.

Close to the new church on its north side was an ash tree planted by the Lady of Lawers during her lifetime, beside which she was later buried according to tradition, along with her servant, called An Combach Ruadh. "The tree will grow", the Lady was said to have predicted, "and when it reaches the gable the church will be split asunder". The church roof did indeed collapse in the 19th century. McKerracher wrote that the tree reached the gable in 1833, when a thunderstorm demolished the church's west loft and caused it to be abandoned as a place of worship. Others linked the prophecy to the Great Disruption of 1843 when the congregation of Lawers left the Church of Scotland and formed the Free Church of Scotland.

It was while this was being built that the Lady uttered the first of her prophecies: "The ridging stones shall never be placed on the roof of the church." This was received with some amusement, as the carved capping stones had that day been brought by boat from Kenmore, but in the night a violent storm blew up and the stones were washed into the deep waters of the loch and could not be recovered. There were two other prophesies concerning the ash tree. A familial Campbell prophecy held that when the Lady's Lawers ash tree grew enough to reach the top church ridge, the House of Balloch at Taymouth Castle would be left without an heir. McKerracher connected the claimed fulfilment of the House of Balloch prophecy with the death of John Campbell, 2nd Marquess of Breadalbane without an heir in 1862.

A final prophecy from the Lady concerning the fate of her ash tree warned that "evil will come to him who harms it"; the tree would be reportedly left alone through the next century until the later 1800s. According to later accounts, John Campbell, the tenant of Milton Farm, eventually felled the tree despite being aware of warnings concerning the prophecy. Gillies placed the felling of the ash tree instead at approximately 1878, while the historian McKerracher further dated the actions of John Campbell to fell the Lady of Lawer's ash tree as late as 1895. Each version of the ash tree harming prophecy associated the act with a series of subsequent misfortunes that befell the responsible Campbell and his cohorts. McKerracher wrote that Campbell, following his actions and ignoring the prophetic warnings, was gored to death by his own Highland bull, that the man who had helped him fell the tree lost his reason and sanity, and was committed to the district asylum, and finally that the young horse employed to remove and then drag away the trunk of the Lady's ash tree also died suddenly.

=== Sheep skulls will make the plough useless ===
A prophecy attributed to the Lady of Lawers was the Gaelic saying, Cuiridh claigionn nan caorach an crann o fheum ("Sheep skulls will make the plough useless"). Michael Newton in the journal Scottish Studies interpreted the saying as predicting that the introduction of sheep would bring the work of men in the fields to an end. The prophecy was not attributed exclusively to the Lady of Lawers, and was also associated with Thomas the Rhymer, Am Fiosaiche Ìleach ("the Islay Seer"), and probably other prophetic figures. Newton identified this prophecy as used to express and intended to contain the negative cultural damage caused by the Highland Clearances, evictions of a significant number of tenants in the Scottish Highlands and Islands, mostly in two phases from 1750 to 1860. The prophecy about the impacts on Highland agriculture were identified by Newton as appearing in five Gaelic language songs. Campbell recorded the five-line Gaelic prophecy as:

A mill will be on every streamlet,
A plough in every boy's hand.
The two sides of Loch Tay in kail gardens;
The sheep's skull will make the plough useless.
And the goose's feathers drive their memories from men.

The prophecy was said to be fulfilled during the time of "John of the three Johns, the worst John that ever was", after which there would be no improvement until the coming of Duncan. Its earliest recorded appearance may have been in a song composed by Seumas Shaw, Bard Loch nan Eala, in the late eighteenth century. It also appeared in Òran air cuairt do dh’America ("A Song on the Voyage to America") by An Cùbair Colach, probably composed in the late eighteenth century. Ailean Dall Dubhghallach included it in Òran do na Cìobairean Gallda ("A Song to the Lowland Shepherds"), composed between 1798 and 1800. It also appeared in Donnchadh Stiubhart's Caoidh air son Cor na Gàidhealtachd agus Fògradh nan Gàidheal ("Lament for the Highland People and the Eviction of the Gaels"), probably composed in the early nineteenth century. An early appearance of this prophecy was recorded by poet Anne Grant in 1811 essays on Gaelic superstition and traditions. Grant in 1811 attributed the prophecy as "current in the highlands" and attributes it to "Thomas of Ercildown", or the reputed Scottish prophet Thomas de Ercildoun, known as Thomas the Rhymer, who was born and lived fl. c. 1220 – 1298.

=== White horse heirs ===
One prophecy held that an old white horse would carry the lineal descendants of Taymouth across Tyndrum Cairn, in Strath Fillan, at the southern edge of Rannoch Moor. Campbell also recorded a variant in which the riders would be the last Breadalbane Campbells. According to the accompanying tradition, there were thirty sons in the family when the prophecy was made, but twenty five were soon afterward killed at the battle of Sron-a-chlachair near Killin.

=== Other attributed prophecies ===
McKerracher identified three prophecies of the Lady of Lawers as still unfulfilled as of 1984, including the Boar Stone tradition discussed above. Of the remaining two propehcies, one of the Lady's foretold that a "ship driven by smoke" would sink in Loch Tay with substantial loss of life. McKerracher wrote that this particular prediction discouraged numerous local people, particularly and notably the last Marquess of Breadalbane, from travelling on the pleasure steamers operated by locals such as Loch Tay Steamboat Company and others that operated on the loch until 1939. A field recording made by Anne Ross in 1964 also preserved a local version in which James MacDiarmid Anderson recalled predictions concerning the arrival of steam boats and a ferry disaster on Loch Tay. The final prophecy of the Lady of Lawers described the nearby mountain of Ben Lawers becoming intensely cold and blighting the surrounding land for a distance of seven miles. McKerracher likewise regarded this prediction as unfulfilled in 1984.

== See also ==
- Alexander Peden – Scottish covenanter and prophet (1626–1686)
- Brahan Seer – Alleged Scottish prophet of the 17th century
- Thomas the Rhymer – 13th-century Scottish laird and reputed prophet from Earlston
