= Richard Firth Green =

Canadian scholar

Richard Firth Green is a Canadian scholar who specializes in Middle English literature. He is an Academy Professor of English (Emeritus) at Ohio State University and the author of three monographs on the social life, law, and literature of the late Middle English period.

Green's first book, Poets and Princepleasers: Literature and the English Court in the Late Middle Ages, studies "business of reading and writing at court", as "a social and a literary history" of the life of men of letters at the English courts of the fourteenth and fifteenth centuries. One of the points argued in the book is that an appointment as court poet also involved important administrative responsibilities, which could be more important than producing poetry: "he was a civil servant first and a poet second". His second book is A Crisis of Truth: Literature and Law in Ricardian England (1998), which Derek Pearsall praised in 2004 as "the best book that has been written on medieval English literature in the last ten years". In A Crisis of Truth, a "monumental, encyclopedic volume", Green analyzes the shift in the meaning of the word and concept of truth during the reign of Richard II of England; this transformation changes "an ethical truth in which truth is understood to reside in persons transforms...into a political truth in which truth is understood to reside in documents" or, in Pearsall's summary, from a subjective to an objective concept. Green's third book, Elf Queens and Holy Friars: Fairy Beliefs and the Medieval Church, “argues that a set of common beliefs about fairies were found across [medieval] Europe, and was shared by all classes of secular people, not just the illiterate peasantry.” Central to his thesis is “the struggle between these secular masses and the Christian clerics who first pronounced that fairies were demons, then promoted them to devils and called belief in them heretical.”[9] Ronald Hutton has written that “this book carries its subject to a new level, and its achievement deserves high praise.” Elf Queens and Holy Friars won the 2017 Mythopoeic Society award for Myth & Fantasy Studies, the 2018 Hans Gründler Book Prize and the 2020 Haskins Medal from the Medieval Academy of America.

== Books authored ==
- Poets and Princepleasers: Literature and the English Court in the Late Middle Ages (1980)
- A Crisis of Truth: Literature and Law in Ricardian England (U of Pennsylvania P, 1998; repr. 2002)
- Elf Queens and Holy Friars: Fairy Beliefs and the Medieval Church (U of Pennsylvania P, 2016)
