= Thatching =

Type of roof

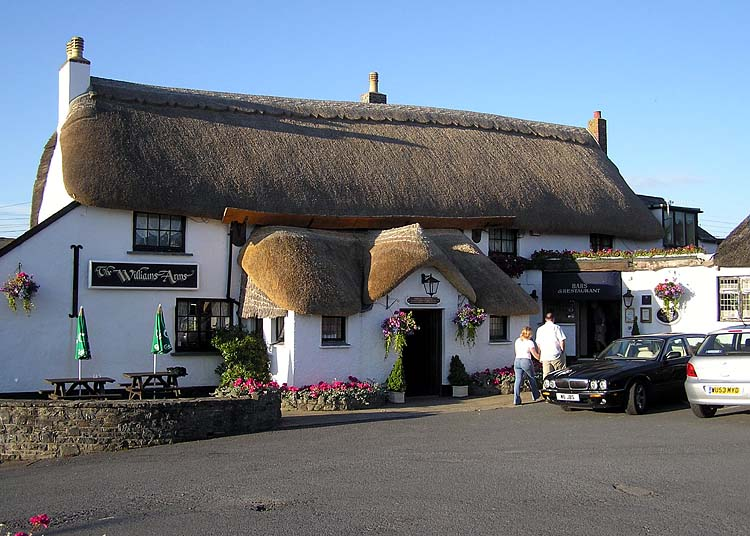
A thatched pub (The Williams Arms) at Wrafton, North Devon, England

Thatching is the craft of building a roof with dry vegetation such as straw, water reed, sedge (Cladium mariscus), rushes, heather, or palm branches, layering the vegetation so as to shed water away from the inner roof. Since the bulk of the vegetation stays dry and is densely packed—trapping air—thatching also functions as insulation. It is a very old roofing method and has been used in both tropical and temperate climates. Thatch is still employed by builders in developing countries, usually with low-cost local vegetation. By contrast, in some developed countries it is the choice of some affluent people who desire a rustic look for their home, would like a more ecologically friendly roof, or who have purchased an originally thatched abode.

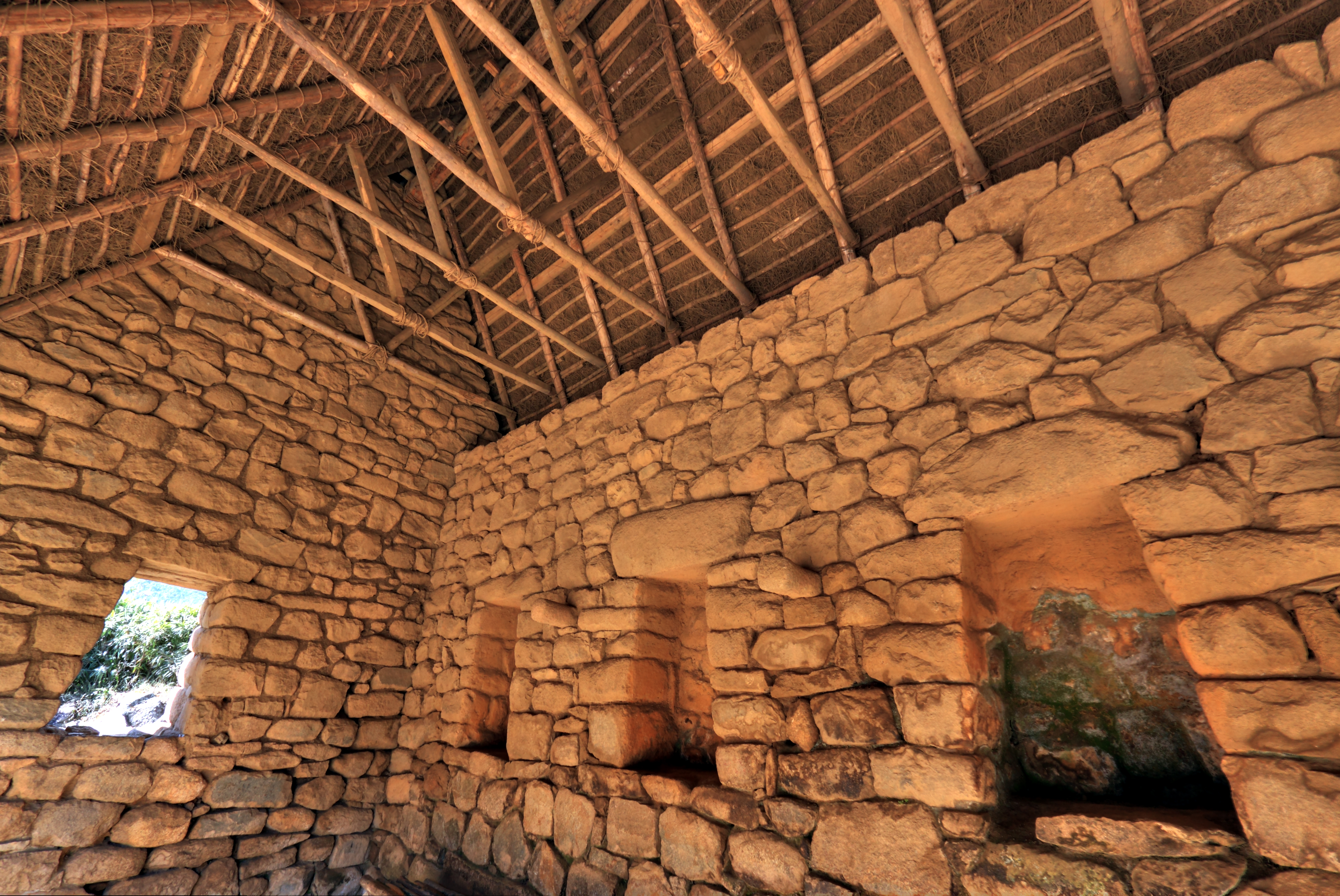
Inside view of an Inca roof in one of the few reconstructed buildings of Machu Picchu

== History ==
Thatching methods have traditionally been passed down from generation to generation and numerous descriptions of the materials and methods used in Europe over the past four centuries survive in archives and early publications.

In some equatorial countries, thatch is the prevalent local material for roofs, and often walls. There are diverse building techniques from the ancient Hawaiian hale shelter made from the local ti leaves (Cordyline fruticosa), lauhala (Pandanus tectorius) or pili grass (Heteropogon contortus).

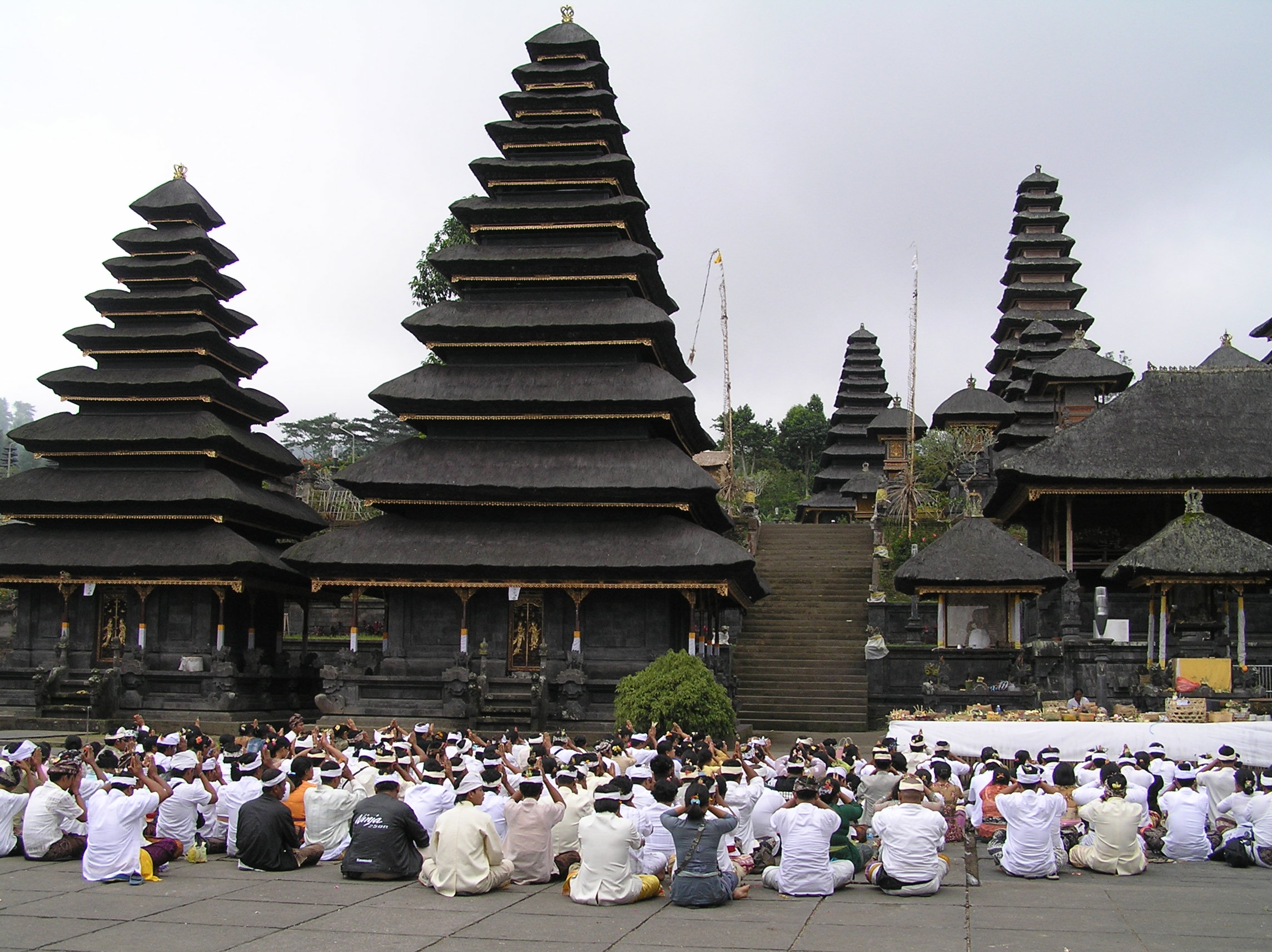
The multi-tiered Meru towers of the Besakih temple in Bali are thatched with black ijuk fibres.

Palm leaves are also often used. For example, in Na Bure, Fiji, thatchers combine fan palm leaf roofs with layered reed walls. Feathered palm leaf roofs are used in Dominica. Alang-alang (Imperata cylindrica) thatched roofs are used in Hawaii and Bali. In Southeast Asia, mangrove nipa palm leaves are used as thatched roof material known as attap dwelling. In Bali, Indonesia, the black fibres of the sugar palm, called ijuk, is also used as thatching material, usually in temple roofs and meru towers. Sugar cane leaf roofs are used in Kikuyu tribal homes in Kenya.

Wild vegetation such as water reed (Phragmites australis), bulrush/cat tail (Typha spp.), broom (Cytisus scoparius), heather (Calluna vulgaris), and rushes (Juncus spp. and Schoenoplectus lacustris) was probably used to cover shelters and primitive dwellings in Europe in the late Palaeolithic period, but so far no direct archaeological evidence for this has been recovered. People probably began to use straw in the Neolithic period when they first grew cereals—but once again, no direct archaeological evidence of straw for thatching in Europe prior to the early medieval period survives.

Many indigenous people of the Americas, such as the former Maya civilization, Mesoamerica, the Inca empire, and the Triple Alliance (Aztec), lived in thatched buildings. It is common to spot thatched buildings in rural areas of the Yucatán Peninsula as well as many settlements in other parts of Latin America, which closely resemble the method of construction from distant ancestors. The first Americans encountered by Europeans lived in structures roofed with bark or skin set in panels that could be added or removed for ventilation, heating, and cooling. Evidence of the many complex buildings with fiber-based roofing material was not rediscovered until the early 2000s. French and British settlers built temporary thatched dwellings with local vegetation as soon as they arrived in New France and New England, but covered more permanent houses with wooden shingles.

In most of England, thatch remained the only roofing material available to the bulk of the population in the countryside, in many towns and villages, until the late 1800s. Commercial distribution of Welsh slate began in 1820, and the mobility provided by canals and then railways made other materials readily available. Still, the number of thatched properties actually increased in the UK during the mid-1800s as agriculture expanded, but then declined again at the end of the 19th century because of agricultural recession and rural depopulation. A 2013 report estimated that there were 60,000 properties in the UK with a thatched roof; they are usually made of long straw, combed wheat reed or water reed.

Gradually, thatch became a mark of poverty, and the number of thatched properties gradually declined, as did the number of professional thatchers. Thatch has become much more popular in the UK over the past 30 years, and is now a symbol of wealth rather than poverty. There are approximately 1,000 full-time thatchers at work in the UK, and thatching is becoming popular again because of the renewed interest in preserving historic buildings and using more sustainable building materials.

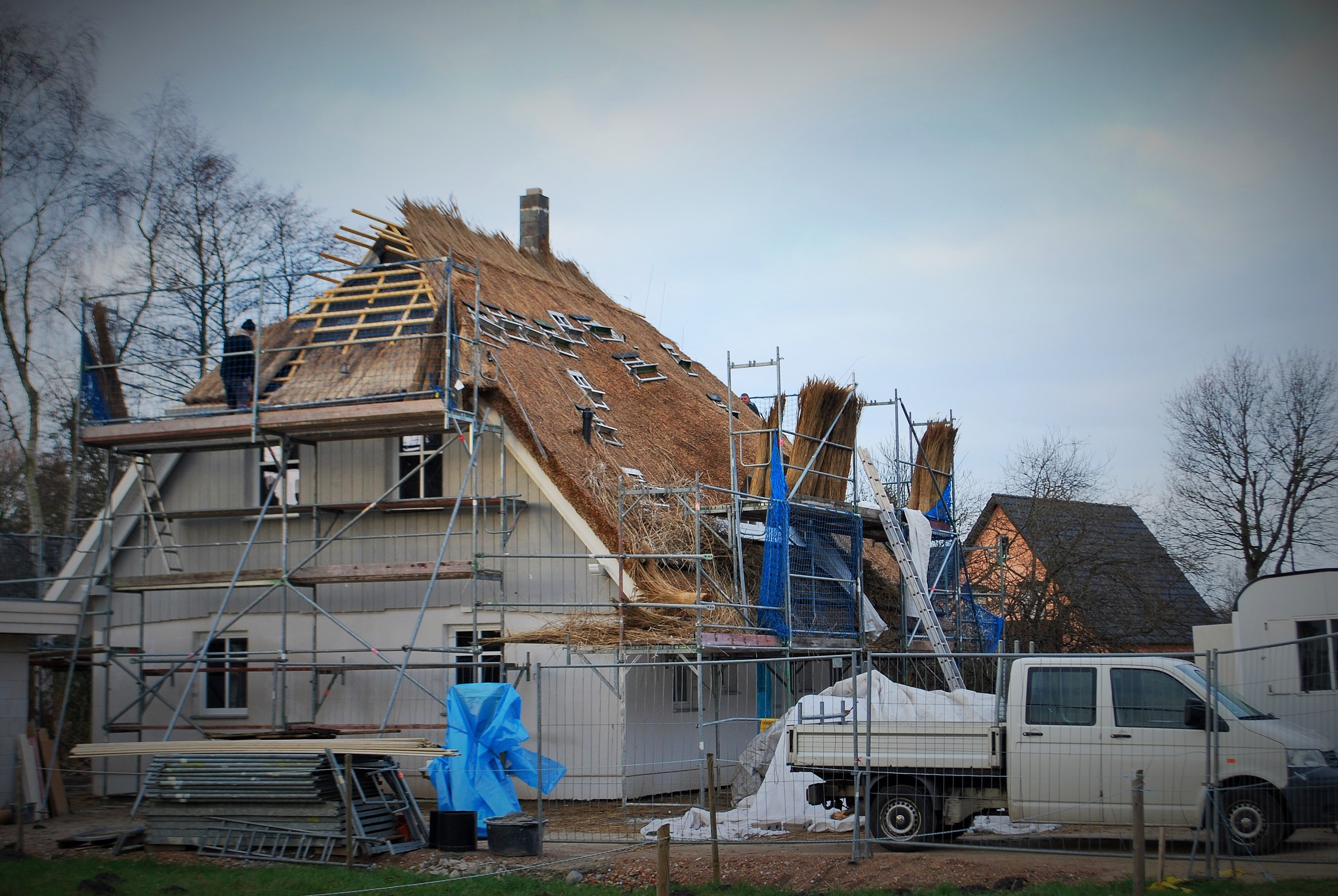
Thatch works on a house in Mecklenburg, Germany

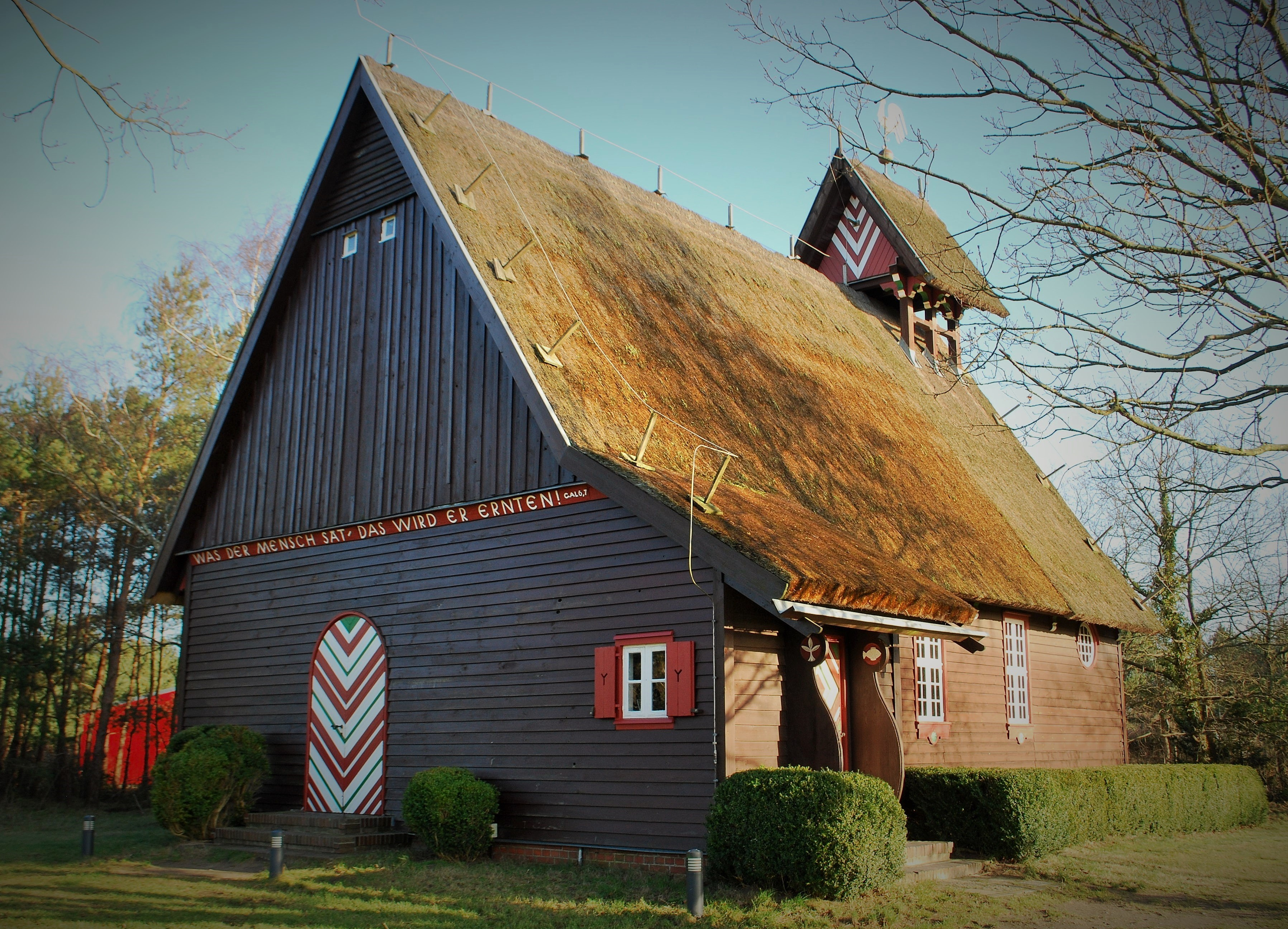
Fishermen's Church in Born auf dem Darß municipality, Germany

Thatched cottages in the sand dunes, Denmark

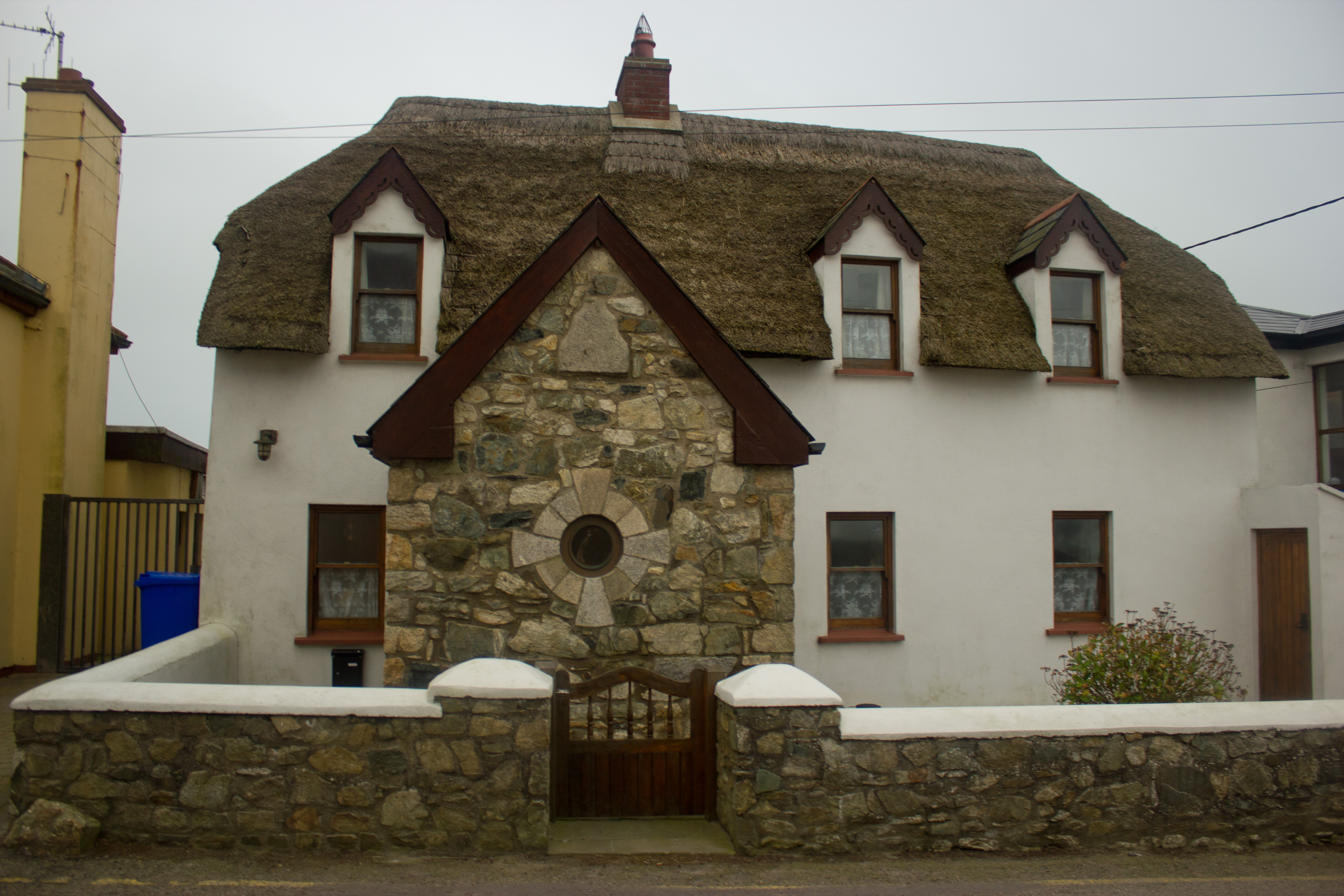
Thatched roof house in Kilmore Quay, Ireland

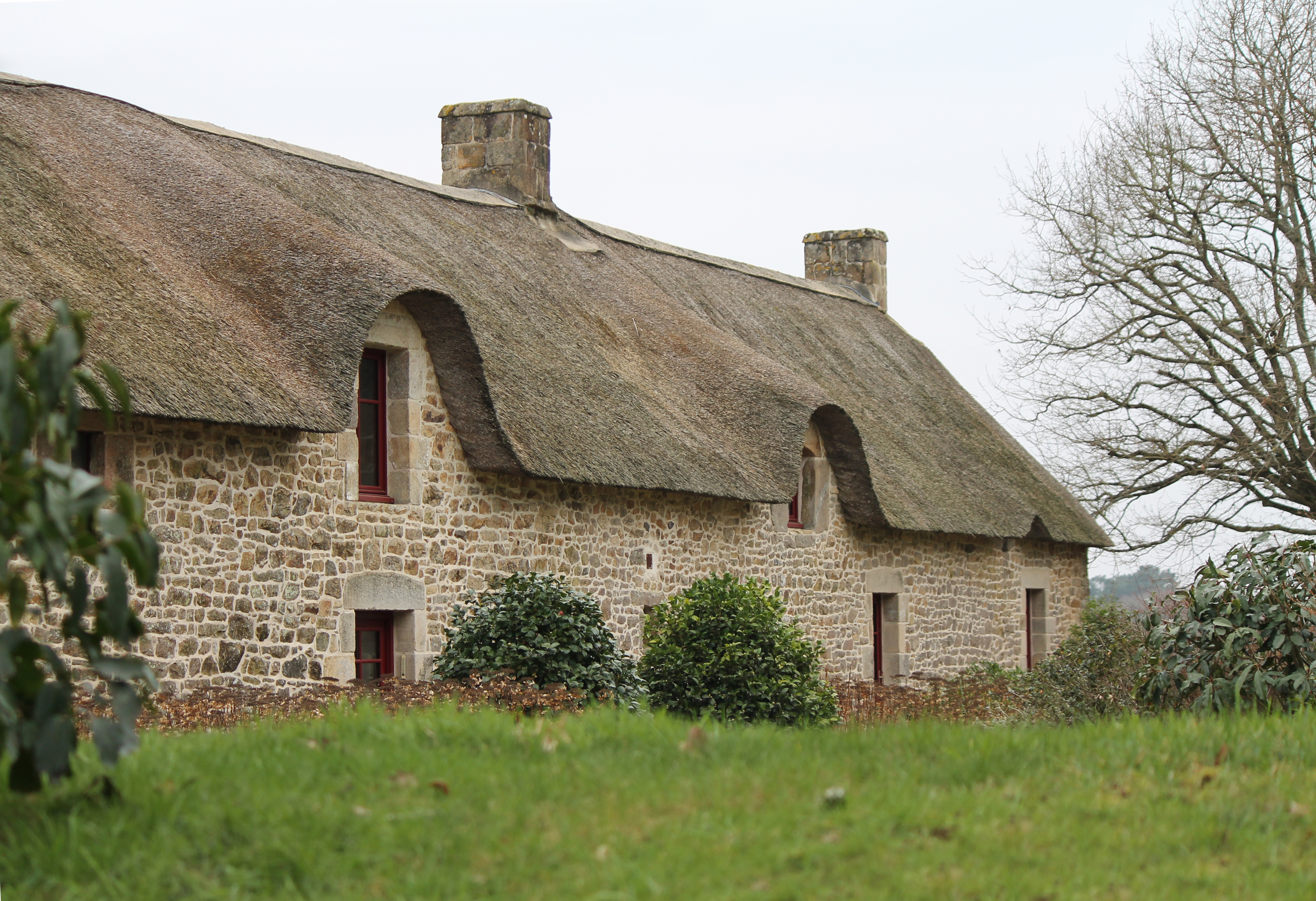
Cahire Breton cottages at Plougoumelen, Brittany, France

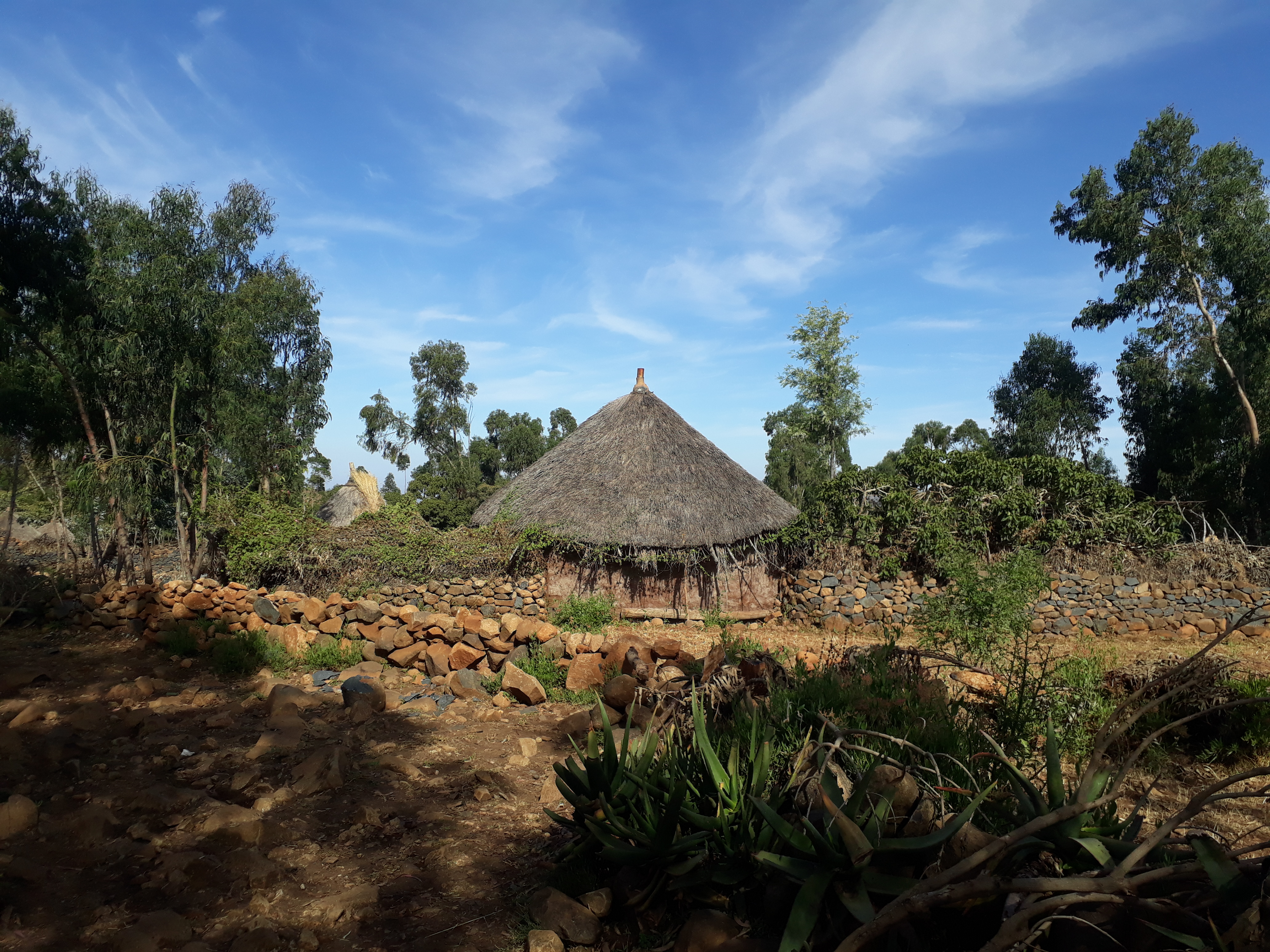
Thatched roofs in Kerene, Ethiopia

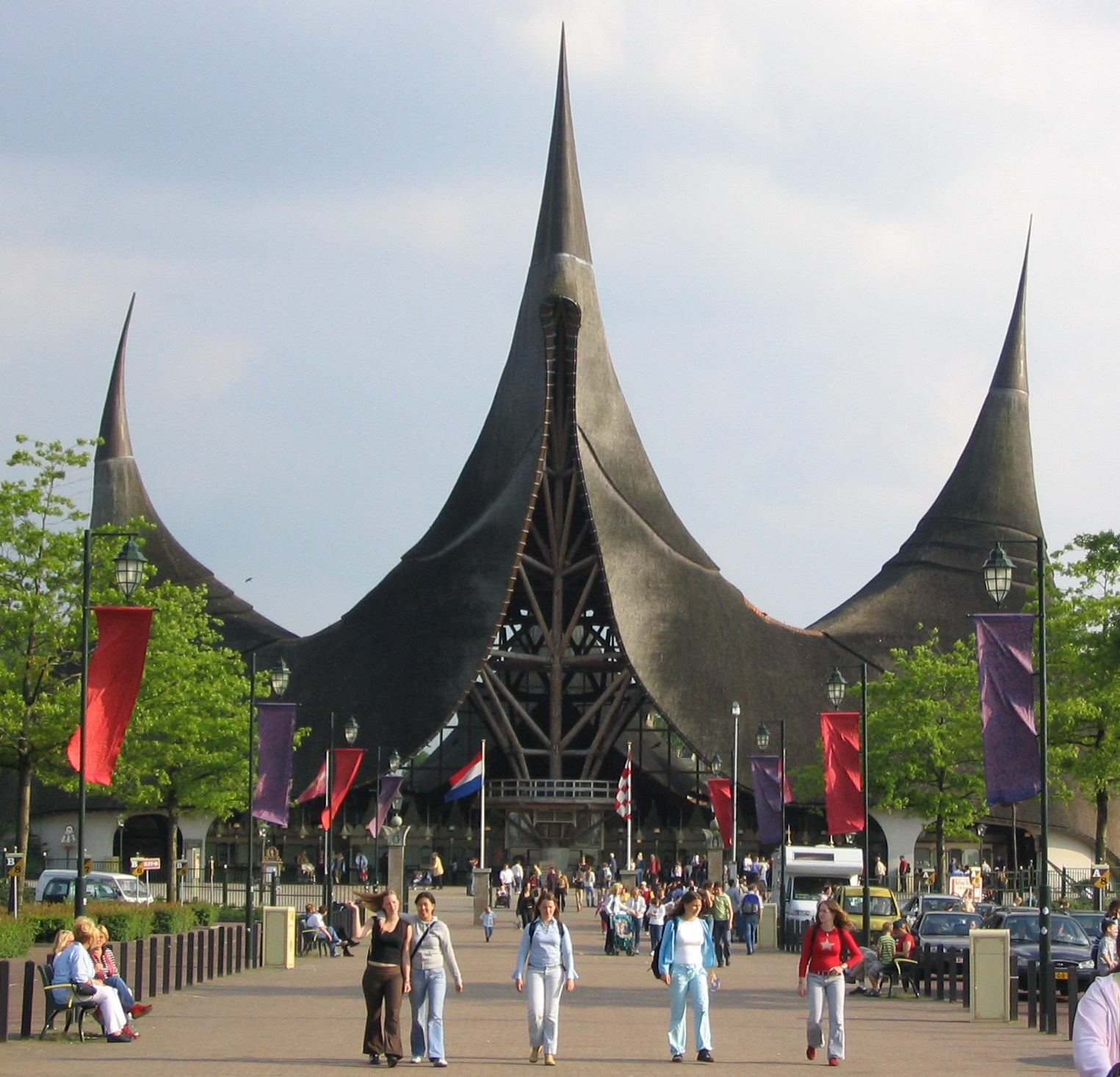
The House of the Five Senses in Kaatsheuvel, Netherlands has the largest thatch roof in the world.

== Material ==
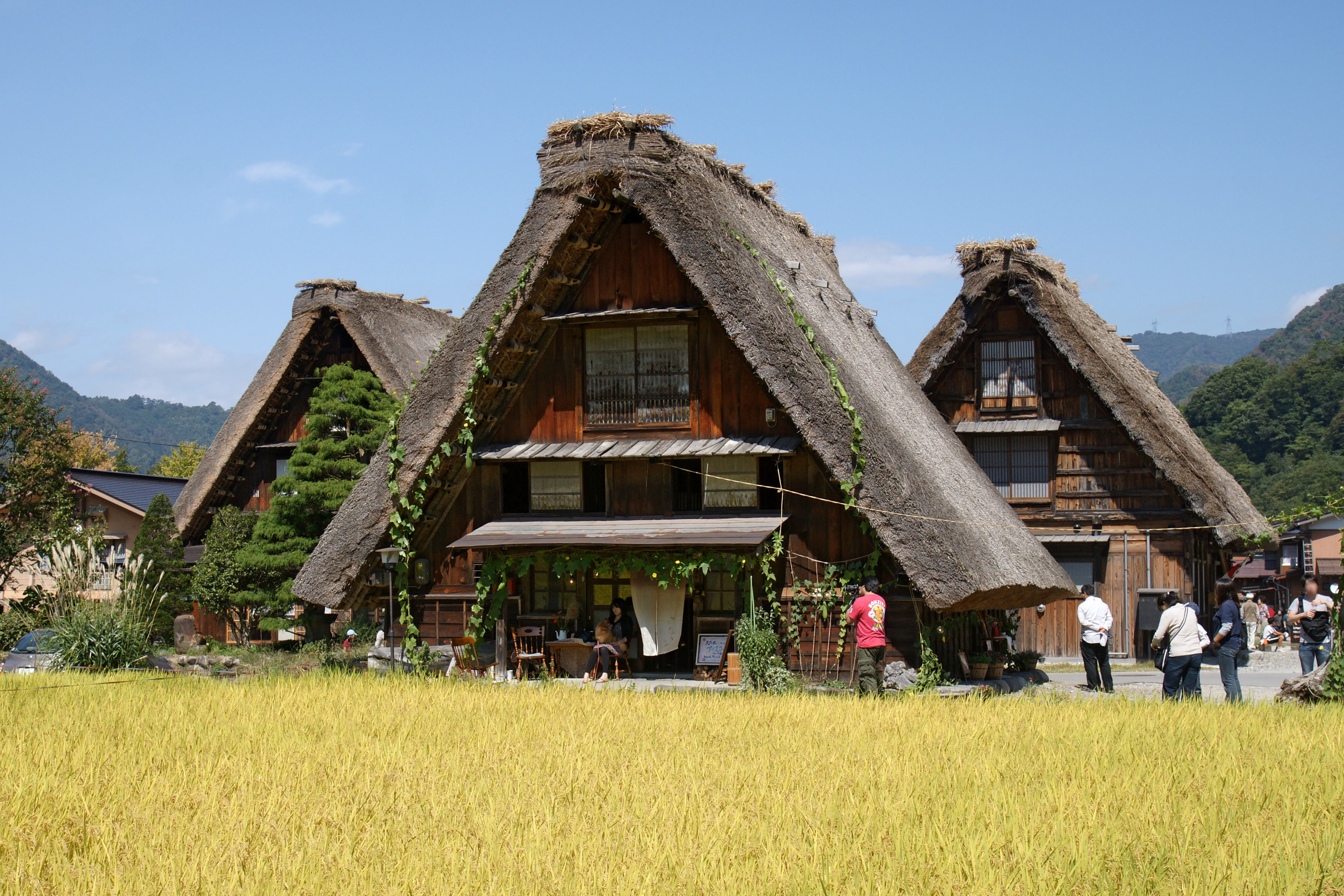
Straw-thatched house at the historic village of Shirakawa-go, a World Heritage Site in Japan

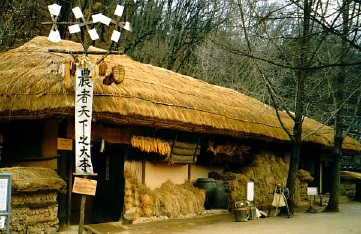
Korean traditional straw thatched house

Good quality straw thatch can last for more than 50 years when applied by a skilled thatcher. Traditionally, a new layer of straw was simply applied over the weathered surface, and this "spar coating" tradition has created accumulations of thatch over 7’ (2.1 m) thick on very old buildings. The straw is bundled into "yelms" before it is taken up to the roof and then is attached using staples, known as "spars", made from twisted hazel sticks. Over 250 roofs in Southern England have base coats of thatch that were applied over 500 years ago, providing direct evidence of the types of materials that were used for thatching in the medieval period. Almost all of these roofs are thatched with wheat, rye, or "maslin" - a mixture of both. Medieval wheat grew to almost 6 feet (1.8 m) tall in very poor soils and produced durable straw for the roof and grain for baking bread.

Technological change in the farming industry significantly affected the popularity of thatching. The availability of good quality thatching straw declined in England after the introduction of the combine harvester in the late 1930s and 1940s, and the release of short-stemmed wheat varieties. Increasing use of nitrogen fertiliser in the 1960s–70s also weakened straw and reduced its longevity. Since the 1980s, there has been a big increase in straw quality as specialist growers have returned to growing older, tall-stemmed, "heritage" varieties of wheat such as Squareheads Master (1880), N59 (1959), Rampton Rivet (1937), Victor (1910) and April Bearded (early 1800s) in low input/organic conditions.

All evidence indicates that water reed was rarely used for thatching outside of East Anglia. It has traditionally been a "one coat" material applied in a similar way to how it is used in continental Europe. Weathered reed is usually stripped and replaced by a new layer. It takes 4–5 acres of well-managed reed bed to produce enough reed to thatch an average house, and large reed beds have been uncommon in most of England since the Anglo-Saxon period. Over 80% of the water reed used in the UK is now imported from Turkey, Eastern Europe, China and South Africa. Water reed might last for 50 years or more on a steep roof in a dry climate, modern imported water reed on an average roof in England, when thatched by a proficient craftsman, is more likely to last roughly 40 years. The lifespan of a thatched roof also depends on the skill of the thatcher, but other factors must be considered—such as climate, quality of materials, and the roof pitch.

In areas where palms are abundant, palm leaves are used to thatch walls and roofs. Many species of palm trees are called "thatch palm", or have "thatch" as part of their common names. In the southeastern United States, Native and pioneer houses were often constructed of palmetto-leaf thatch. The chickees of the Seminole and Miccosukee are still thatched with palmetto leaves. Makuti thatching in East Africa uses Cocos nucifera.

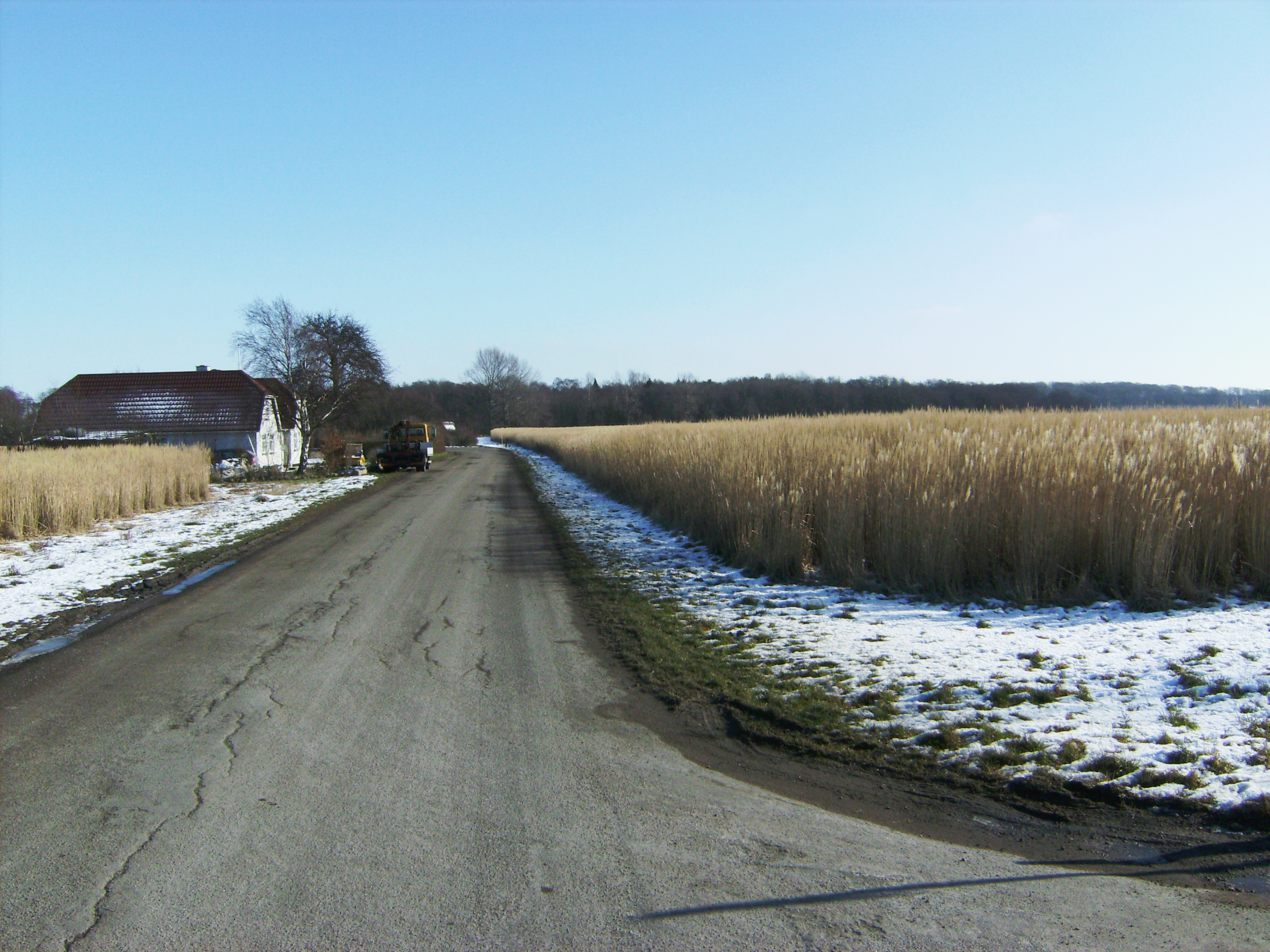
A thatching silvergrass (Miscanthus) field in Sandager, Denmark

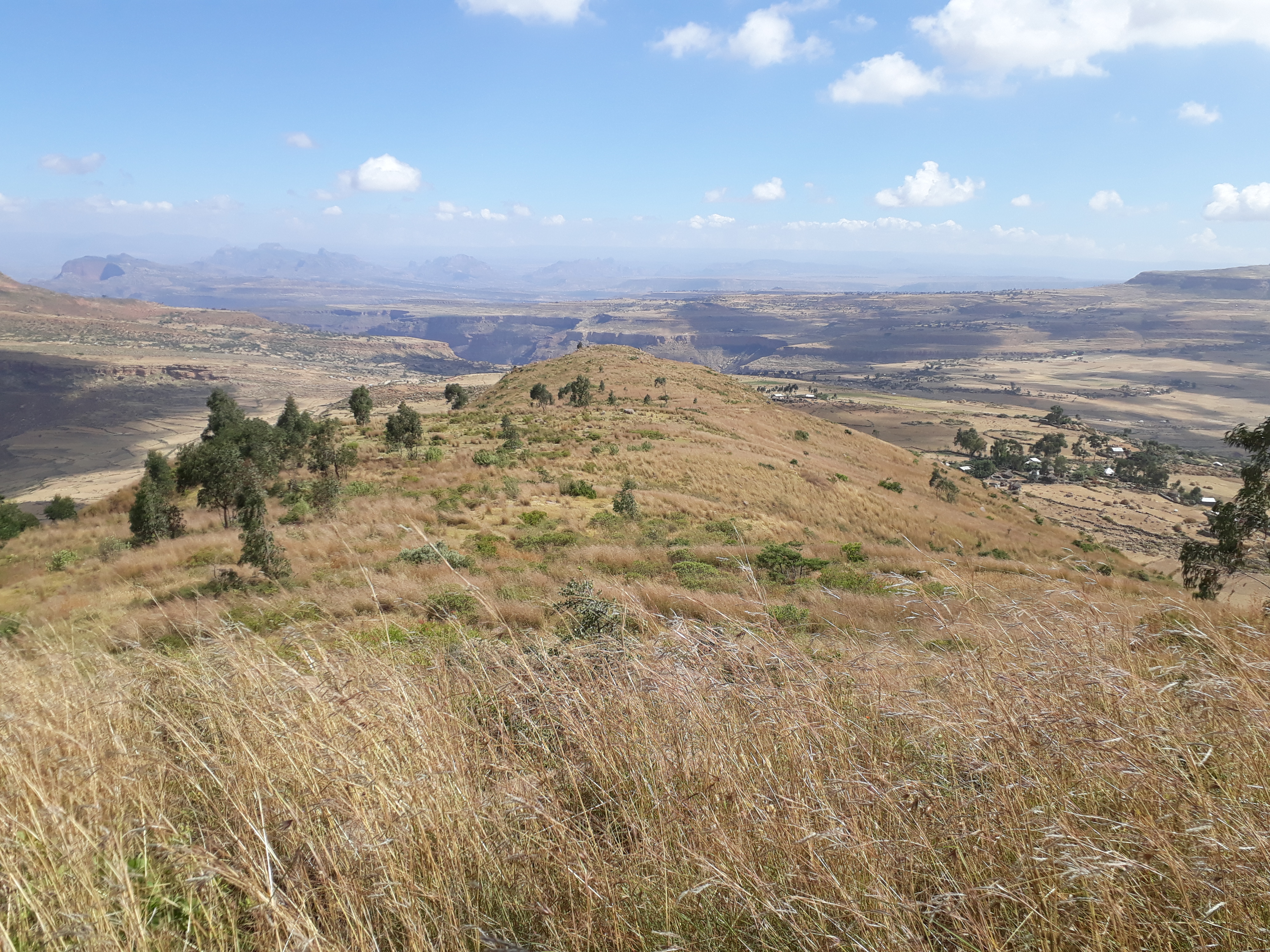
Grassland with thatching grass on Imba Abba Salama Mt. in Haddinnet, Ethiopia

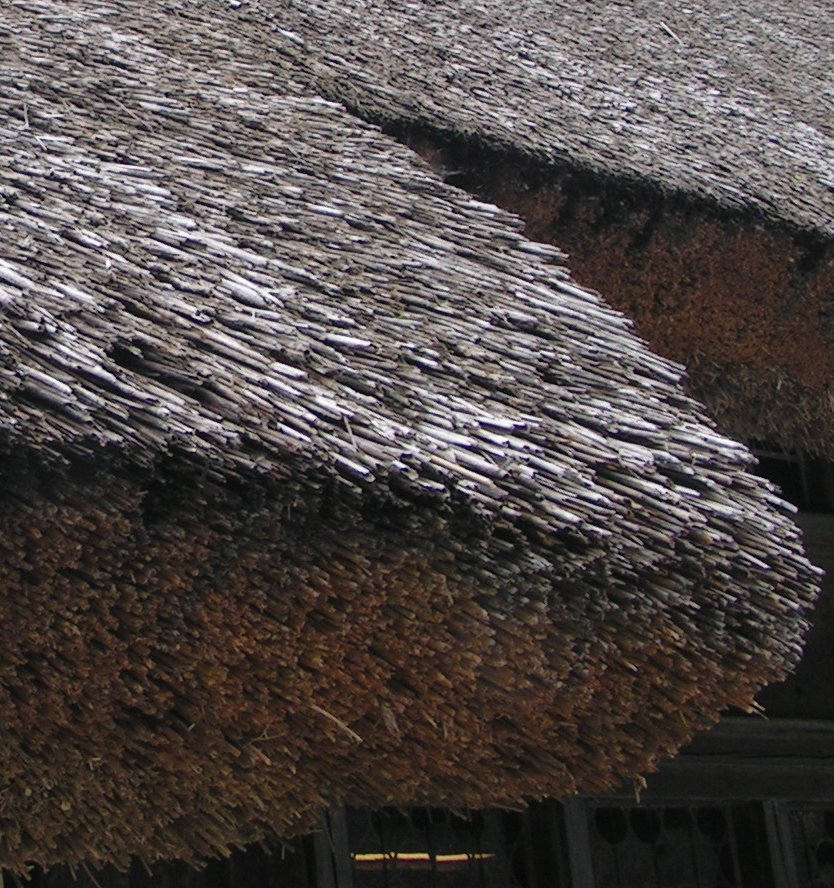
A closeup of English thatching

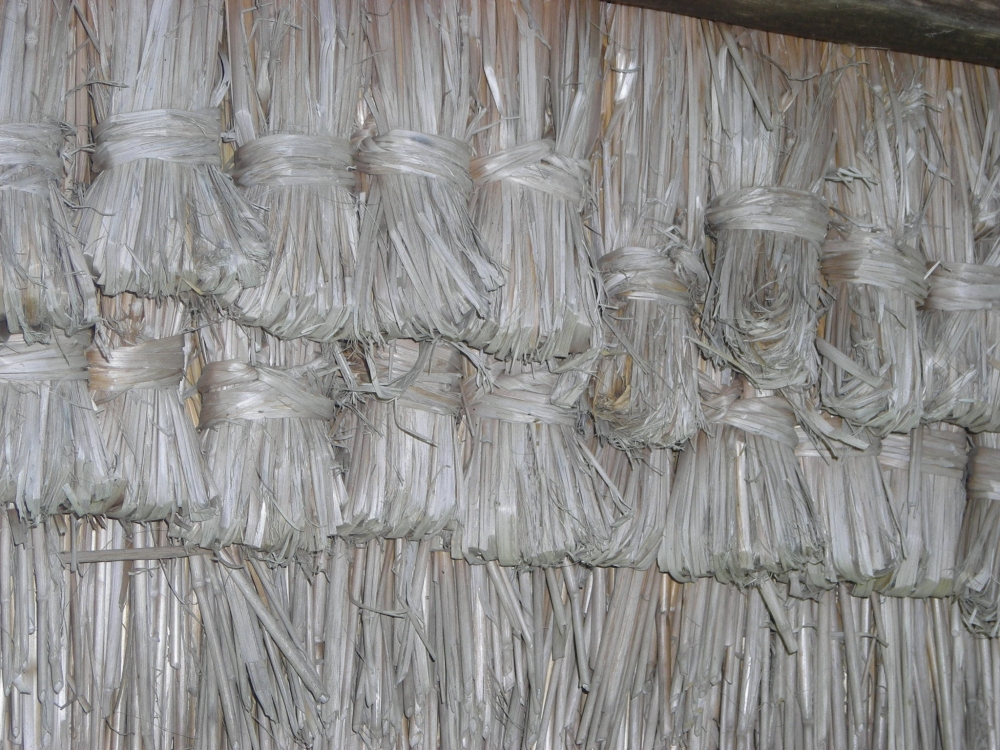
Bundling technique used in straw thatching

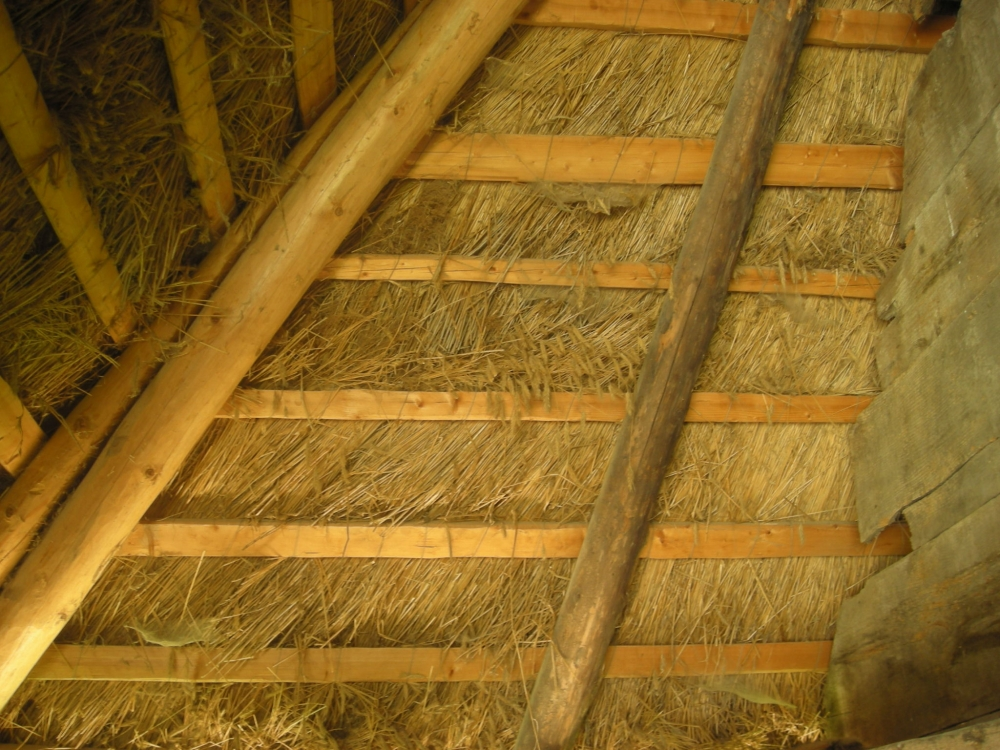
Inside view of a straw-thatched house

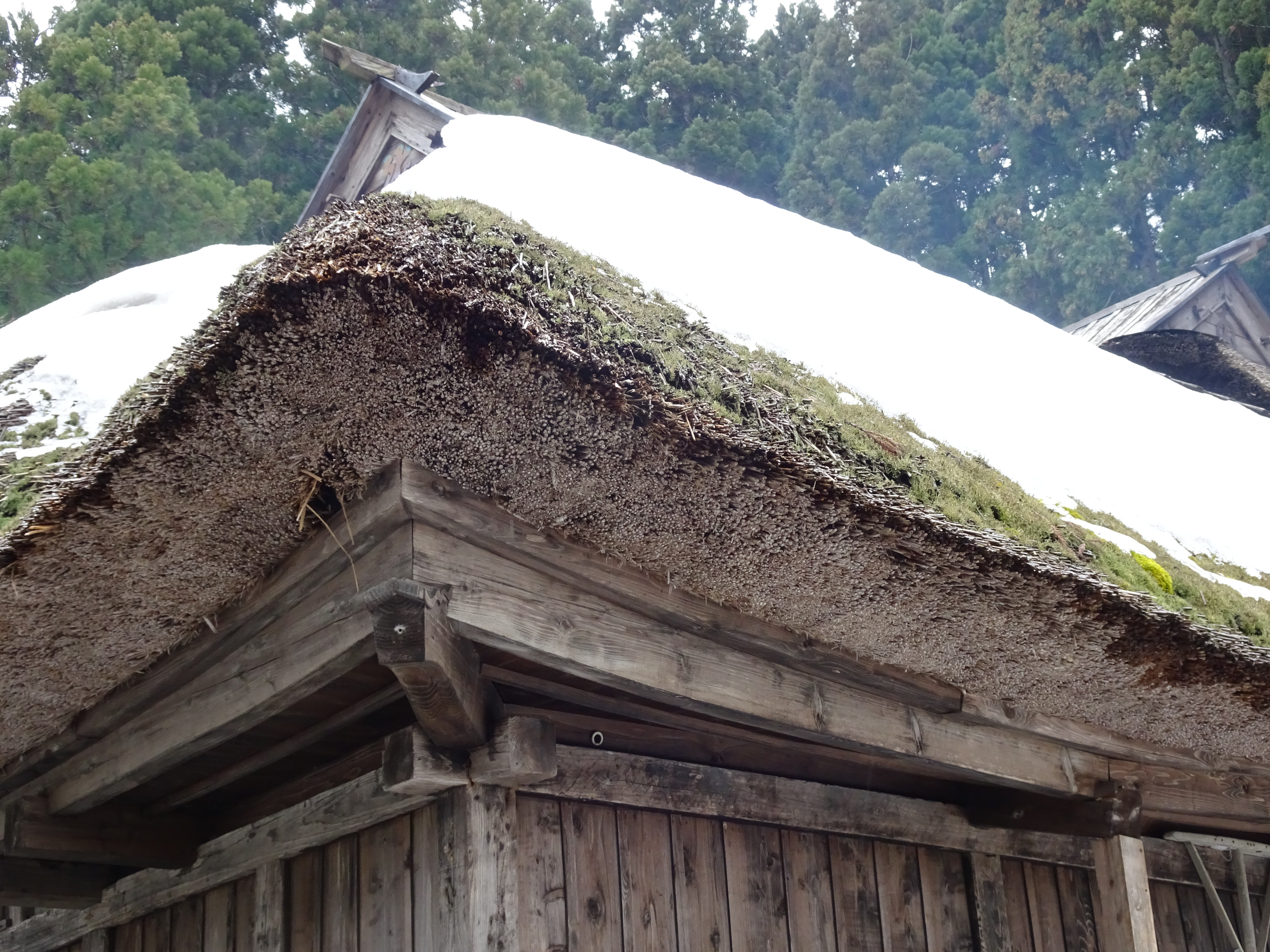
Thatched roof with snow, Japan

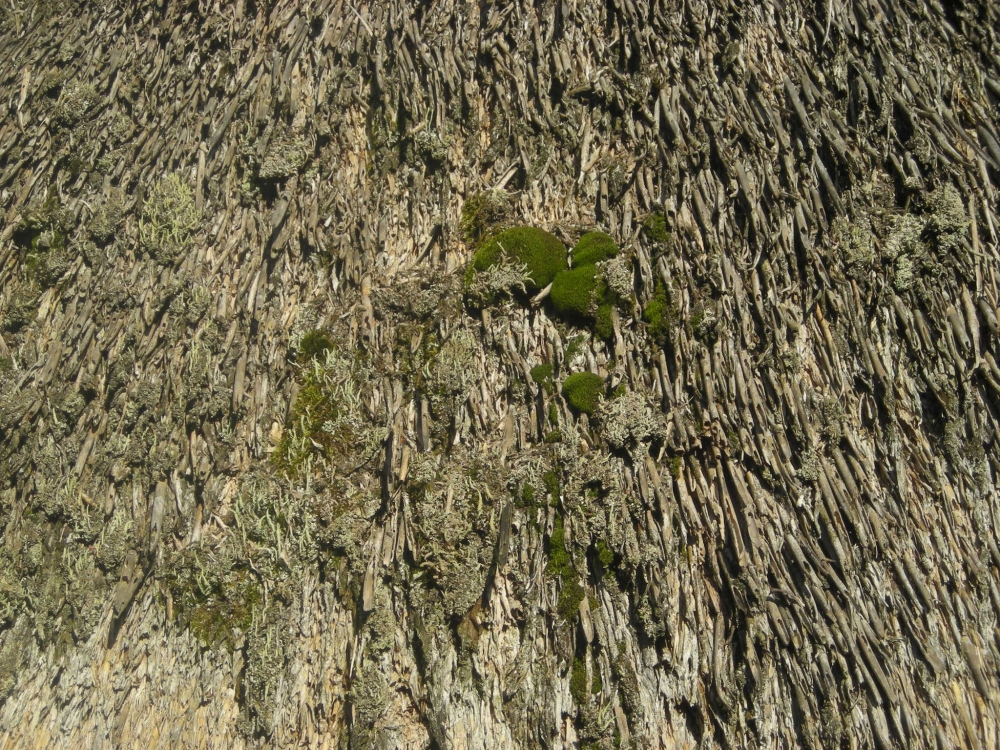
Outside layer of moss and lichen growing on thatch

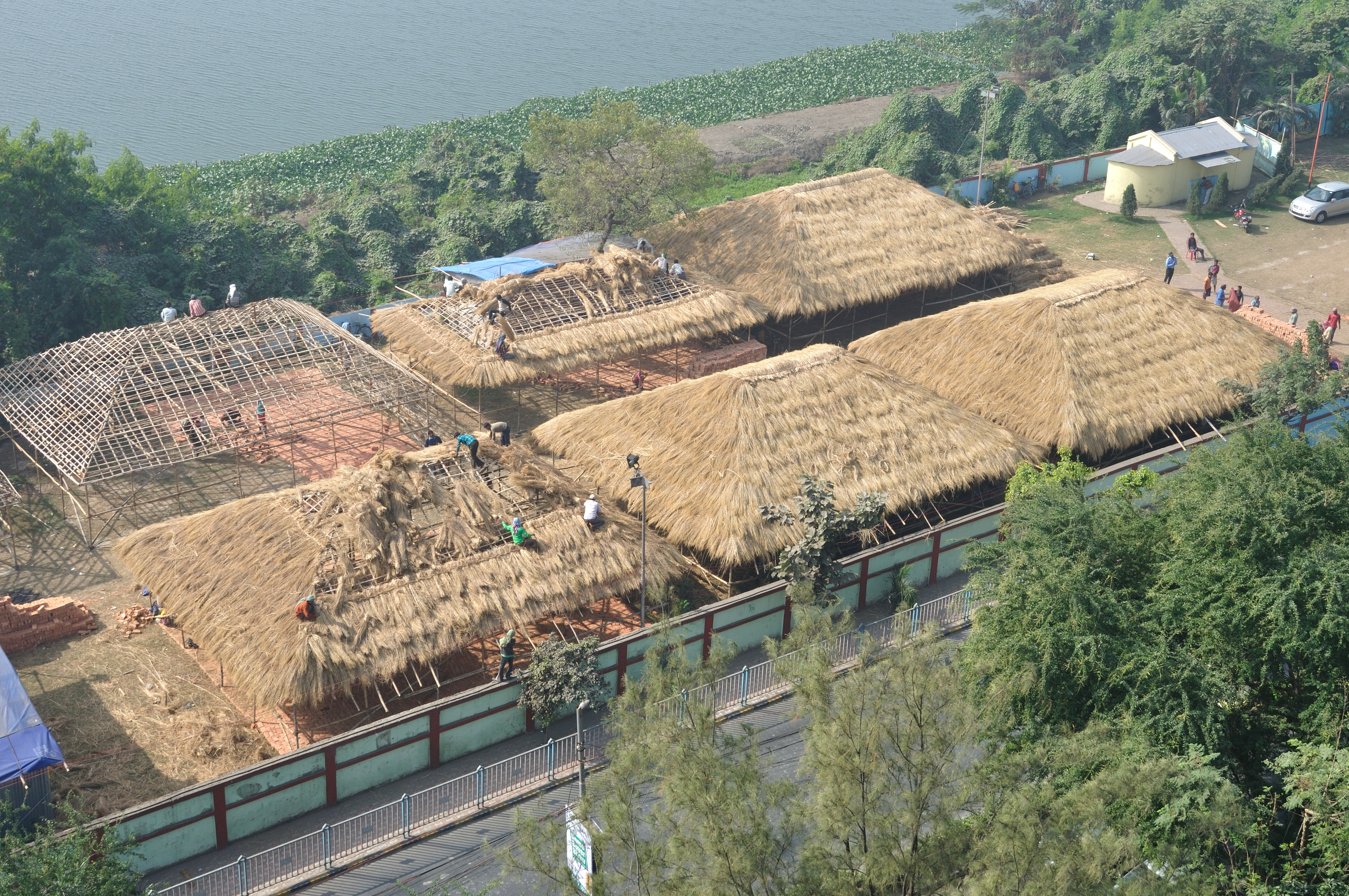
Hay thatching for making Pandals at Kolkata

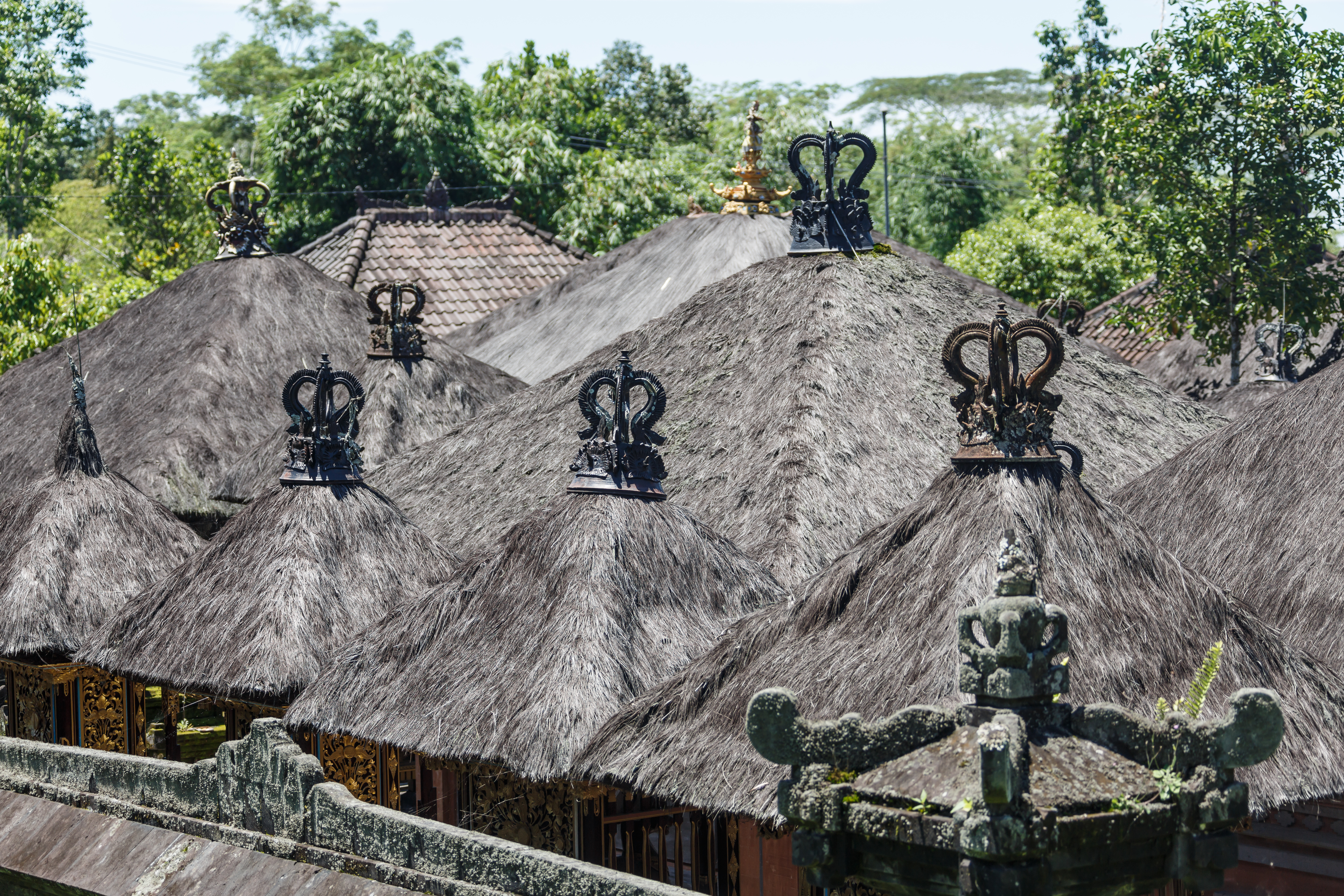
Thatched roof made of ijuk (black sugar palm fibres) at Besakih, Bali

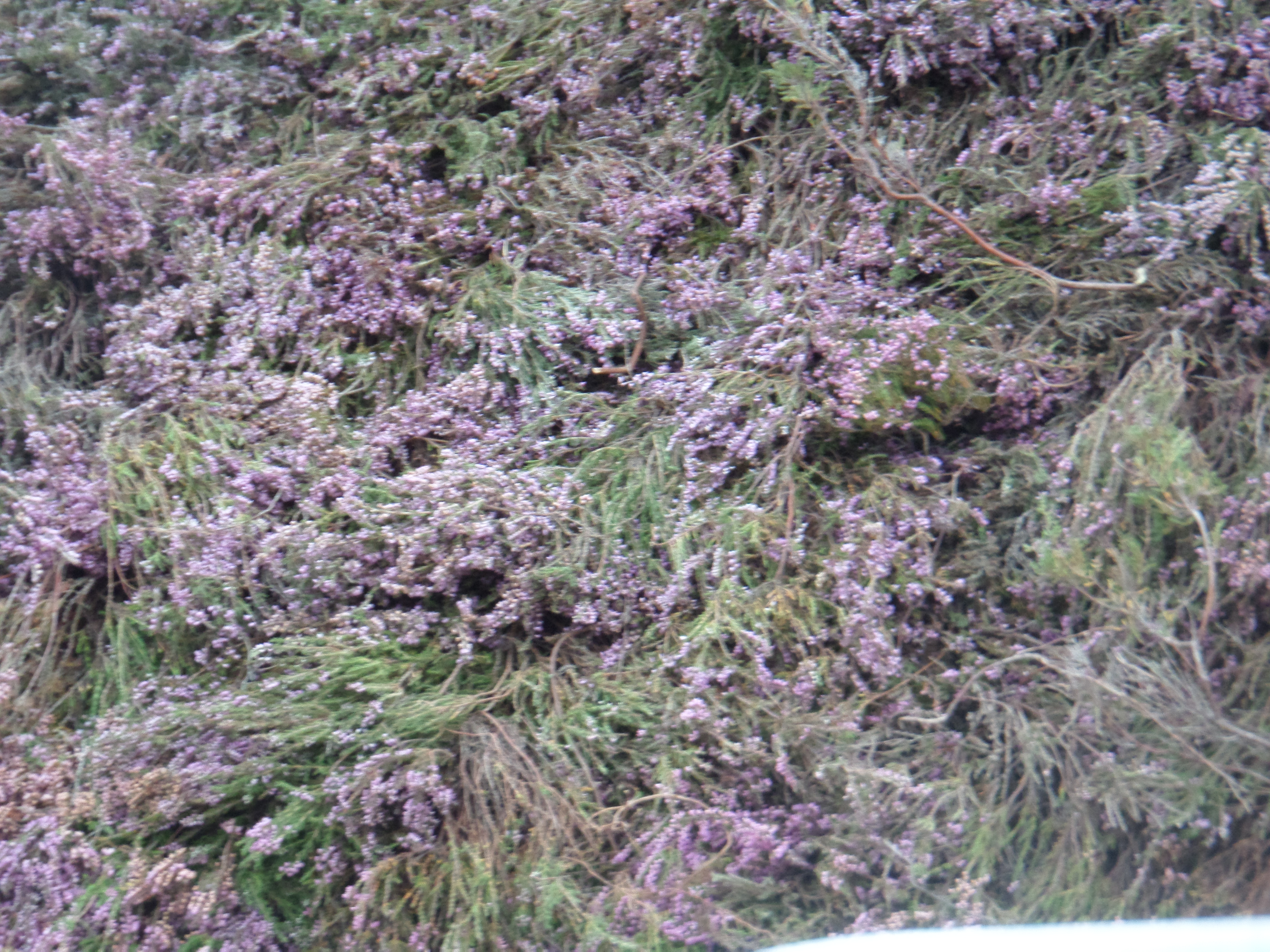
Heather thatching at Culloden, Scotland

== Maintenance in temperate climates ==
Thatch has a maintenance cycle in the UK of 12–15 years, at which time the ridge will need to be replaced and other works to the main body of the roof can be undertaken. The thickness of a layer of thatch decreases as the surface gradually composts, and is blown and washed away by wind and rain. Thatched roofs need replacement when the horizontal wooden 'sways' and hair-pin 'spars', also known as 'gads' (twisted hazel staples) that fix each course become visible near the surface. It is not the depth of the thatch layer applied to a new roof that determines longevity, but rather the depth of thatch covering the fixings of each overlapping course. “A roof is as good as the amount of correctly laid thatch covering the fixings.”

Moss can be a problem if very thick, but is not usually detrimental, and many species of moss are actually protective. The Thatcher's Craft, 1960, remains the most widely used reference book on thatching techniques.

Each roof is subject to its own specific conditions and will weather according to many outside influences - the skill of the thatcher being an important aspect affecting longevity.

== Flammability ==
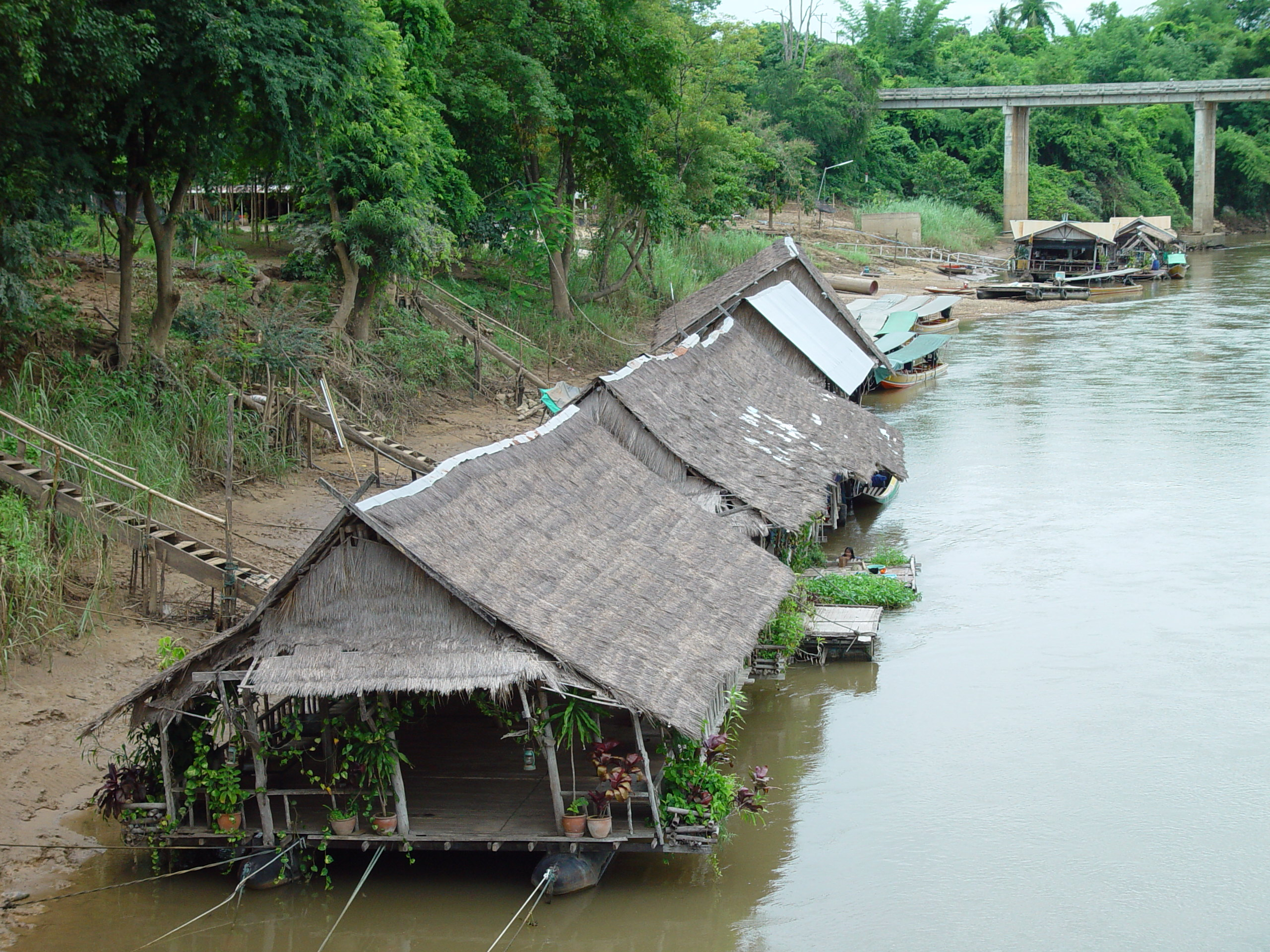
River houses on the River Kwai

Thatch is not as flammable as many people believe. Thatch is said to burn slowly, "like a closed book," as has been stated by individuals familiar with the material. The vast majority of fires are linked to the use of wood burners and faulty chimneys with degraded or poorly installed or maintained flues. Sparks from paper or burned rubbish can ignite dry thatch on the surface around a chimney. Fires can also begin when sparks or flames work their way through a degraded chimney and ignite the surrounding semi-charred thatch. This can be avoided by ensuring that the chimney is in good condition, which may involve stripping thatch immediately surrounding the chimney to the full depth of the stack. This can easily be done without stripping thatch over the entire roof. Insurance premiums on thatched houses are higher than average in part because of the perception that thatched roofs are a fire hazard, but also because a thatch fire can cause extensive smoke damage and a thatched roof is more expensive to replace than a standard tiled or slate roof. Workmen should never use open flame near thatch, and nothing should be burnt that could fly up the chimney and ignite the surface of the thatch. Spark arrestors usually cause more harm than good, as they are easily blocked and reduce air flow. All thatched roofs should have smoke detectors in the roof space. Spray-on fire retardant or pressure impregnated fire retardants can reduce the spread of flame and radiated heat output.

On new buildings, a solid fire retardant barrier over the rafters can make the thatch sacrificial in case of fire. If fireboards are used, they require a ventilation gap between boarding and thatch so that the roof can breathe, as condensation can be a significant problem in thin, single layer thatch. Condensation is much less of a problem on thick straw roofs, which also provide much better insulation since they do not need to be ventilated.

== Performance ==
The performance of thatch depends on roof shape and design, pitch of roof, position—its geography and topography—the quality of material and the expertise of the thatcher.

=== Advantages ===
Thatch has some natural properties that are advantageous to its performance. It is naturally weather-resistant, and when properly maintained does not absorb a lot of water. There should not be a significant increase to roof weight due to water retention. A roof pitch of at least 50 degrees allows precipitation to travel quickly down slope so that it runs off the roof before it can penetrate the structure.

Thatch is also a natural insulator, and air pockets within straw thatch insulate a building in both warm and cold weather. A thatched roof ensures that a building is cool in summer and warm in winter.

Thatch also has very good resistance to wind damage when applied correctly.

Thatching materials range from plains grasses to waterproof leaves found in equatorial regions. It is the most common roofing material in the world, because the materials are readily available.

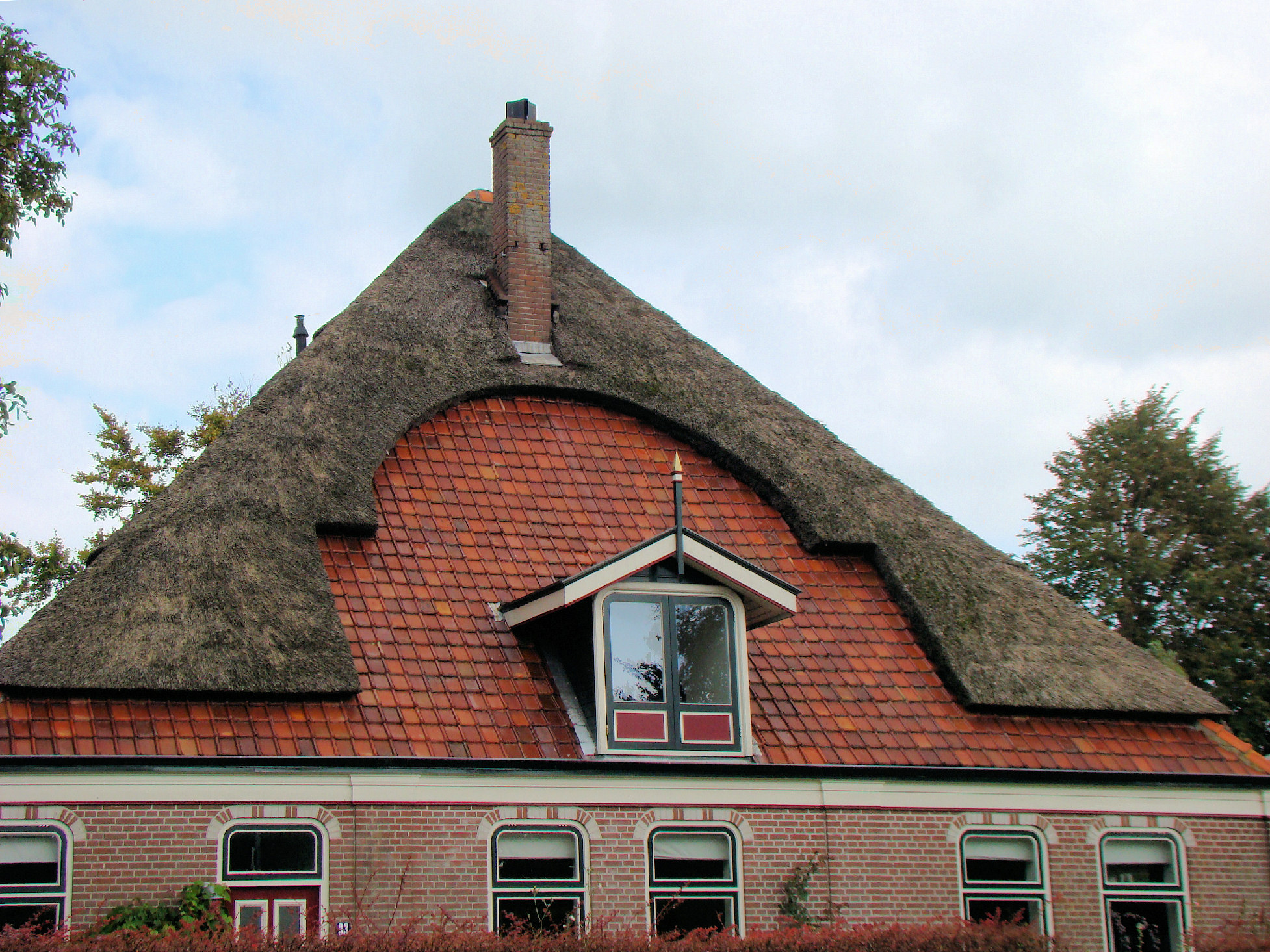
Farm-house in the Netherlands near Alkmaar. The combination of thatch and roof tiles is quite common in that area.

Because thatch is lighter, less timber is required in the roof that supports it.

Thatch is a versatile material when it comes to covering irregular roof structures. This fact lends itself to the use of second-hand, recycled and natural materials that are not only more sustainable, but need not fit exact standard dimensions to perform well.

=== Disadvantages ===
Thatched houses are harder to insure because of the perceived fire risk. In the UK, 50–80 thatched roofs are destroyed in house fires yearly. Because thatching is labour-intensive, it is much more expensive to thatch a roof than to cover it with slate or tiles. Birds can damage a roof while they are foraging for grubs, and rodents are attracted by residual grain in straw.

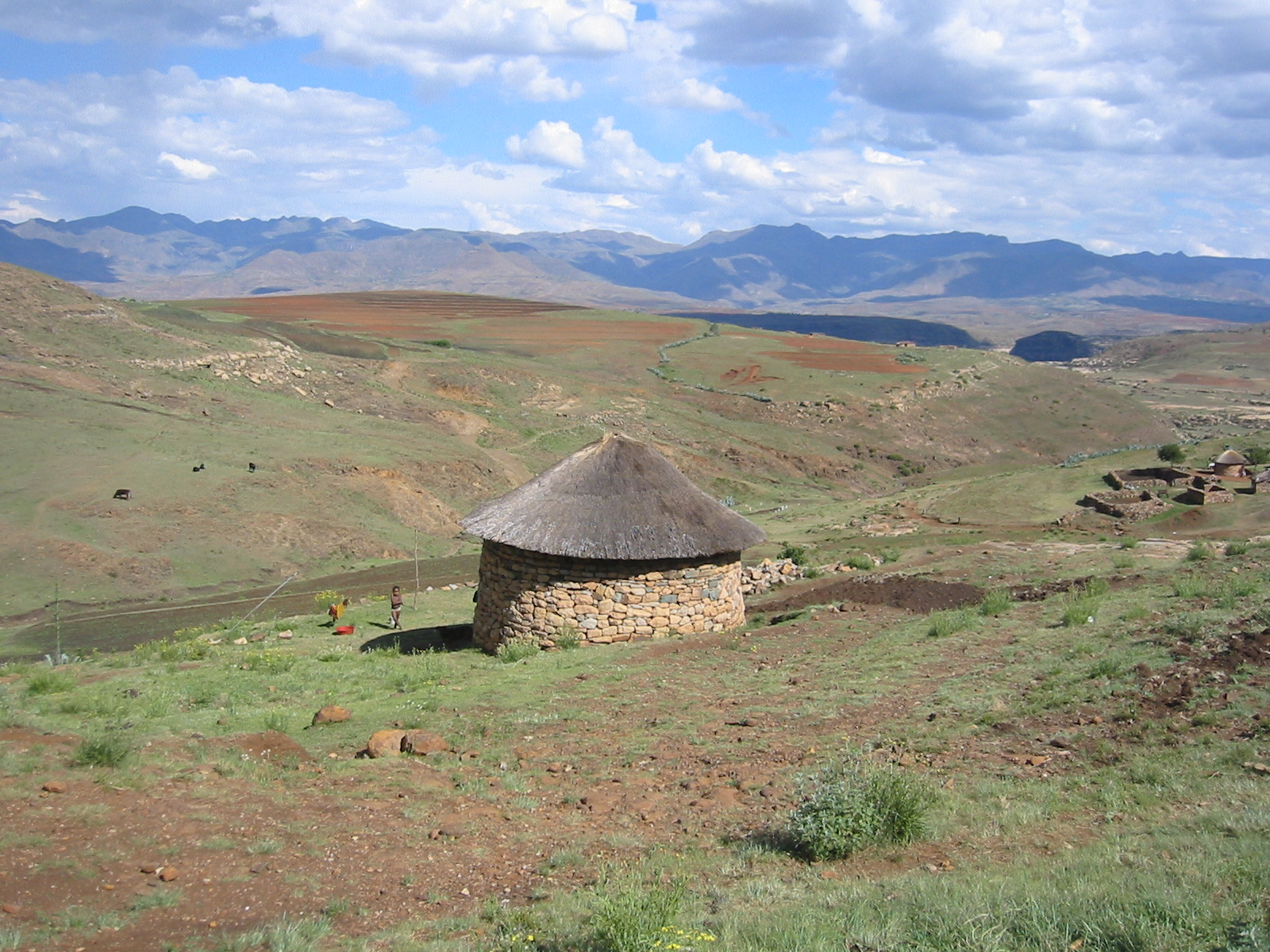
Thatched hut in Lesotho, Africa

New thatched roofs were forbidden in London in 1212 following a major fire, and existing roofs had to have their surfaces plastered to reduce the risk of fire. The modern Globe Theatre is one of the few thatched buildings in London, but the Globe's modern, water reed thatch is purely for decorative purpose and actually lies over a fully waterproofed roof built with modern materials. The Globe Theatre, opened in 1997, was modelled on the original Globe, which was destroyed by a fire on a dry June night in 1613 when a burning wad of cloth ejected from a special effects cannon during a performance set light to the surface of the thatch. The nearby Rose Theatre was actually thatched with cereal straw, a sample of which was recovered by Museum of London archaeologists during the excavation of the site in the 1980s.

Whether thatch can cope with regular snowfall depends — as with all roofing materials — on the strength of the underlying roof structure and the pitch of the surface. A law passed in 1640 in Massachusetts outlawed the use of thatched roofs in the colony for this reason. Thatch is lighter than most other roofing materials, typically around 34 kg/m^{2} (7 lb/sq ft), so the roof supporting it does not need to be so heavily constructed, but if snow accumulates on a lightly constructed thatched roof, it could collapse. A thatched roof is usually pitched between 45 and 55 degrees and under normal circumstances this is sufficient to shed snow and water. In areas of extreme snowfall, such as parts of Japan, the pitch is increased further.

== Archaeology ==
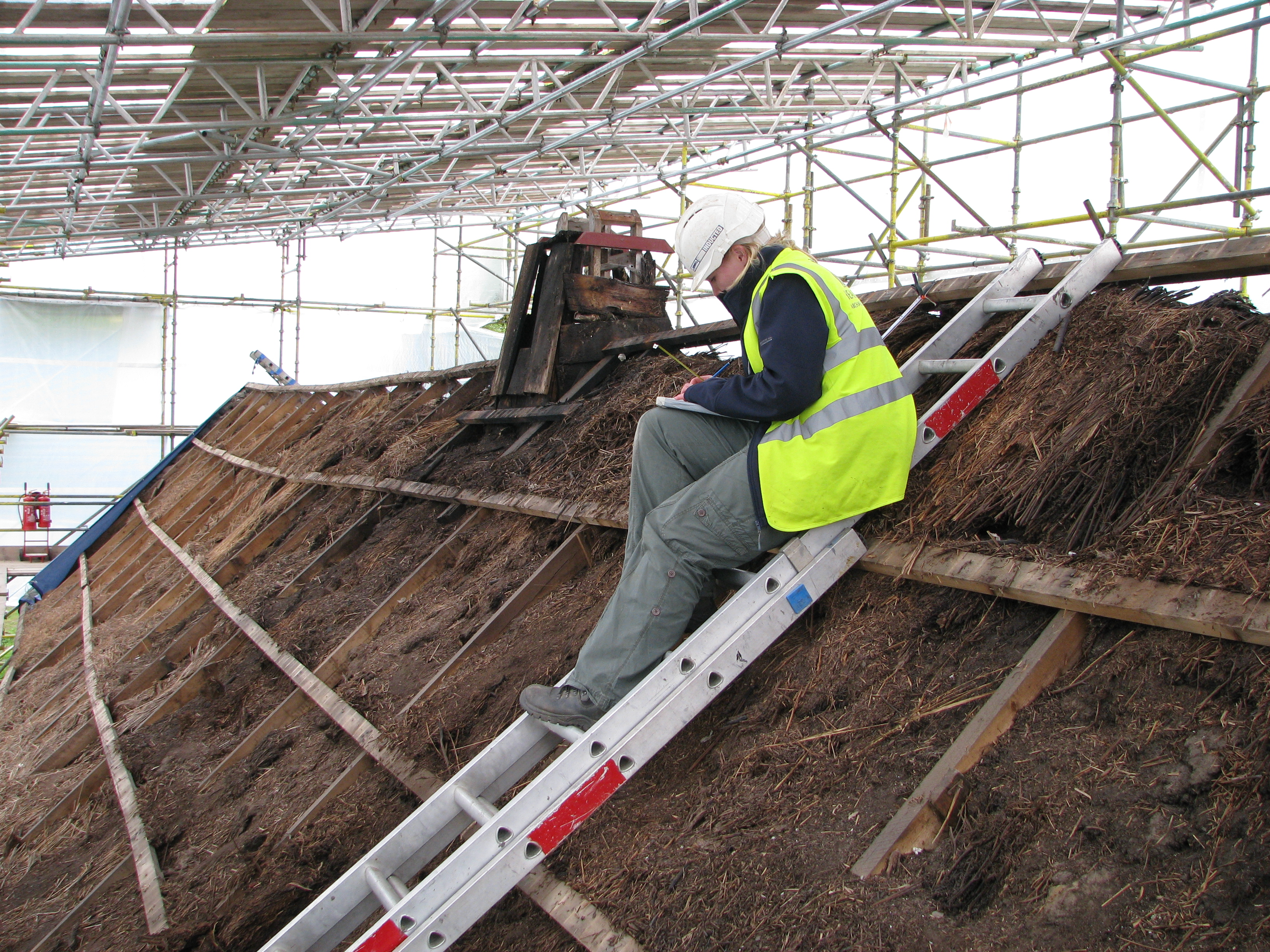
Excavation of the thatch at Moirlanich Longhouse

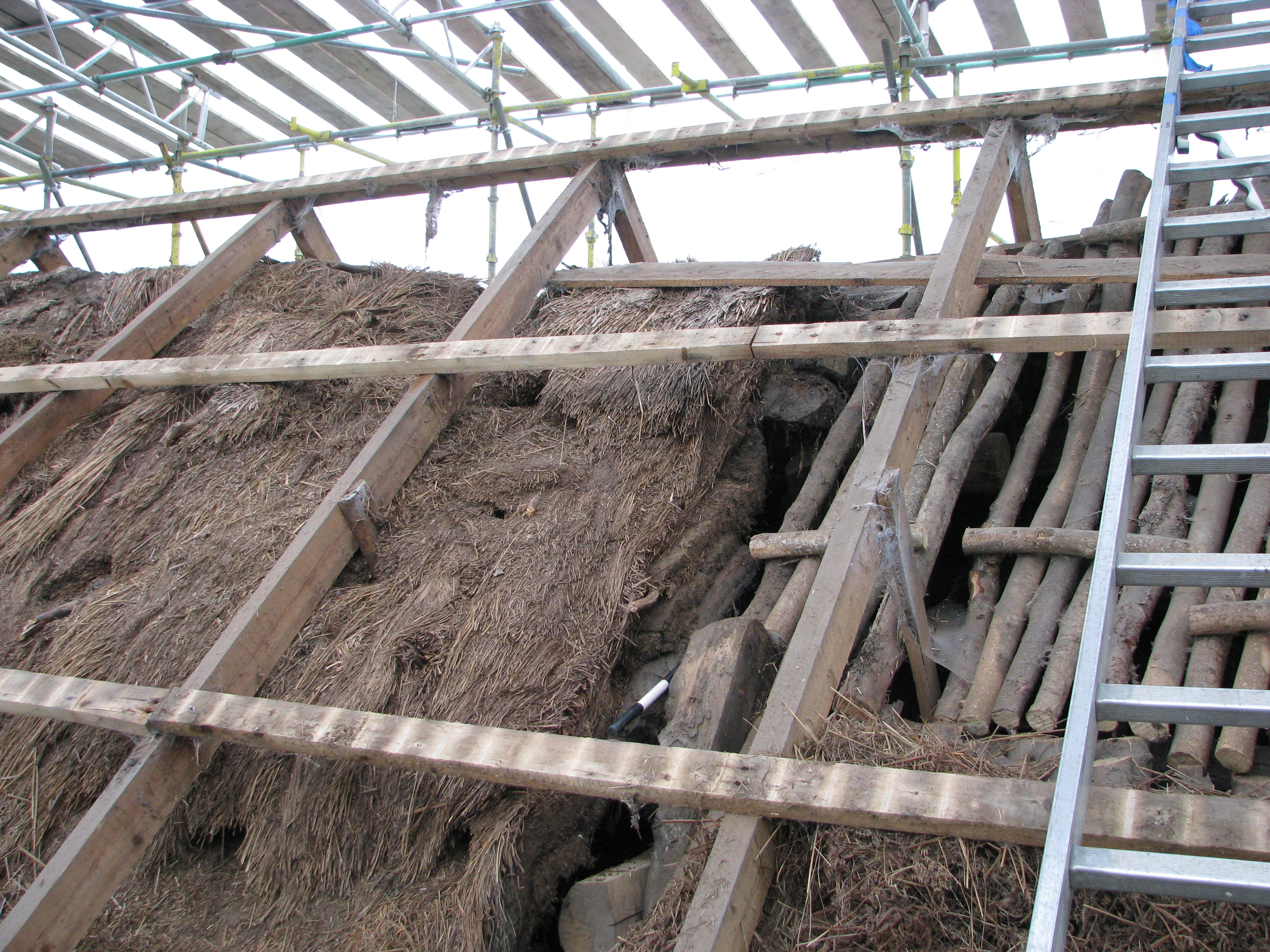
Section through the thatch at Moirlanich Longhouse

Some thatched roofs in the UK are extremely old and preserve evidence of traditional materials and methods that had long been lost. In northern Britain this evidence is often preserved beneath corrugated sheet materials and frequently comes to light during the development of smaller rural properties. Historic Scotland have funded several research projects into thatching techniques and these have revealed a wide range of materials including broom, heather, rushes, cereals, bracken, turf and clay and highlighted significant regional variation.

More recent examples include the Moirlanich Longhouse, Killin owned by the National Trust for Scotland (rye, bracken & turf) and Sunnybrae Cottage, Pitlochry owned by Historic Scotland (rye, broom & turf).

== Examples ==
- Attap dwelling, Southeast Asia
- Blackhouse, Scotland, Ireland
- Chickee, Seminole
- Palapa, Mexico
- Roundhouse (dwelling), Iron Age European
- Teitos e pallozas, Asturias and Galicia, Spain
- Historic Villages of Shirakawa-gō and Gokayama
- Shinmei-zukuri
- Normandy, Brittany, France

== See also ==
- Dethatcher, for lawns
- Houses at Auvers, depiction in art
- Swiss cottage, Cahir Thatched cottage orné in Cahir, Ireland.
- Vernacular architecture
- Woodway House A thatched cob cottage orné in Devon, England.
- Withy A thatching material from willows
- The House of the Five Senses the largest thatch roof in the world in Kaatsheuvel, Netherlands
- Covering (construction)

== Bibliography ==
- Letts, John (2000) [1999], Smoke Blackened Thatch: a unique source of late medieval plant remains from Southern England, Reading & London: University of Reading and English Heritage.
