= Thatch palm =

Thatch palm is a common name for several different species of palm trees that are used for thatching, and may refer to:

- Coccothrinax, many species native to the Caribbean
- Howea, two species native to Lord Howe Island, Australia
- Thrinax, three species native to the Caribbean
- Cocos nucifera, the coconut tree, used in Makuti thatching
