= Makuti thatching =

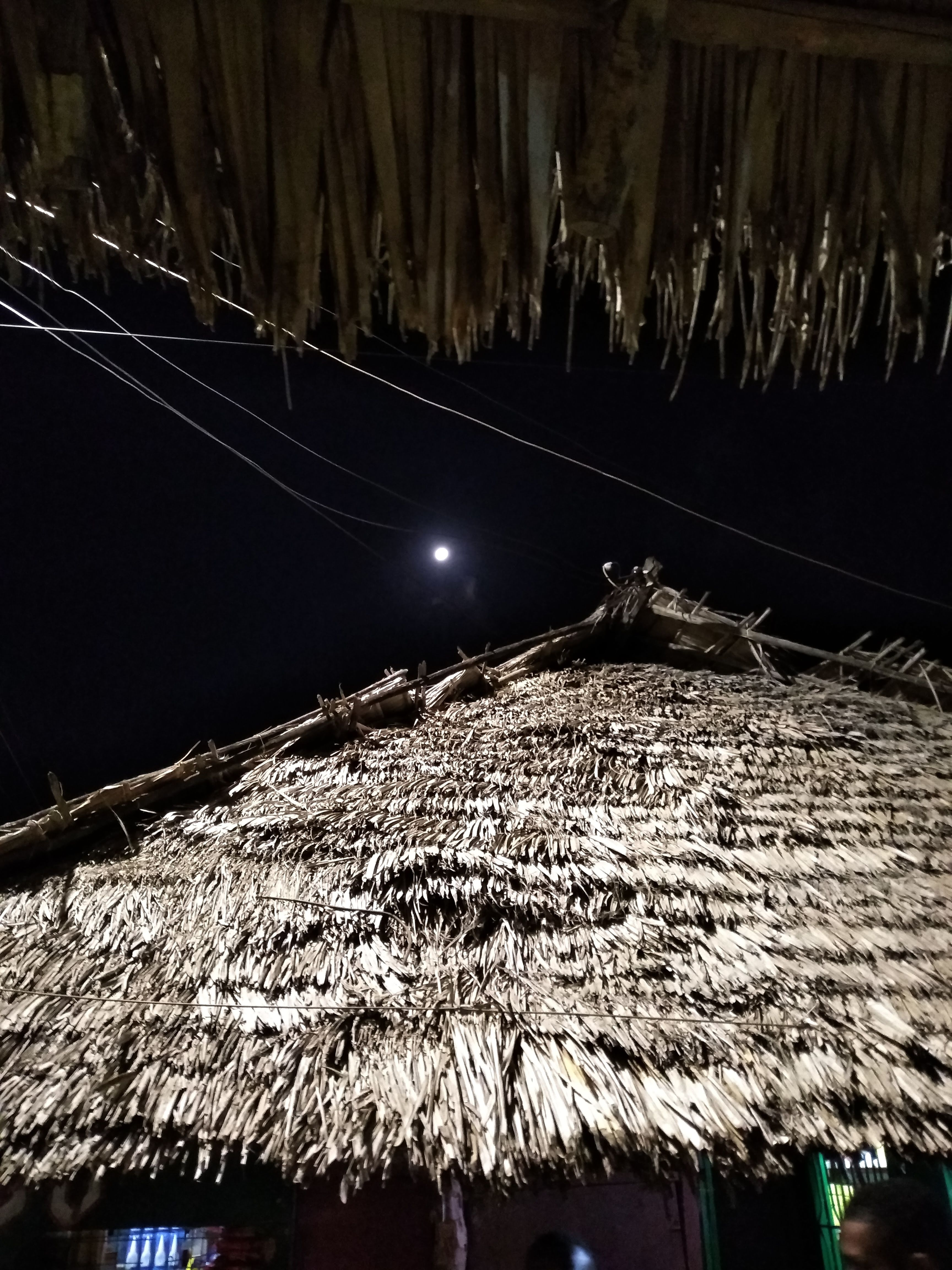
Makuti roof in Lamu Island, Kenya

Makuti is thatching made from the sun-dried leaves of the coconut palm Cocos nucifera. It is widely used across East Africa.
